= Janet (given name) =

- Pronunciation: /ˈdʒænɪt/ JAN-it
- Gender: Female

Origin
- Origin: [Hebrew]
- Meaning: "God is gracious" or "gift from God"

Other names
- Related names: Jeanette, Jane, Juanita, Jeanne, Janeth, Janat, Żaneta

Janet is a feminine given name meaning "God is gracious" or "gift from God". It is the feminine form of John. It is a variation of the French proper noun Jeannette, Spanish proper noun Juanita, Russian Жанет (Zhanet), Circassian Джэнэт (Dzhenet), and Hungarian Zsanett. It is also the diminutive of Jeanne or Jane.

== People with the given name Janet ==
- Janet Aalfs (born 1956), American poet and martial artist
- Janet Abbate (born 1962), American associate professor of science, technology, and society
- Janet Abu-Lughod (1928–2013), American sociologist
- Janet Abuel (born 1971), Filipino lawyer, accountant, and public servant
- Janet Achola (born 1988), Ugandan middle-distance runner
- Janet Achurch (1863–1916), English stage actress and actor-manager
- Janet Ackland (1938–2019), Welsh international lawn- and indoor bowler
- Janet Adair (c. 1892–1938), American vaudeville-, ragtime-, musical revue-, and musical comedy performer
- Janet Adam (1940–2021), Scottish potter and sculptor
- Janet Adams (born 1937), American politician
- Janet Adelman (1941–2010), American Shakespeare scholar, literary critic, and professor of English
- Janet Adkins (born 1965), American politician
- Janet Afary, Iranian-born American author, feminist activist, and researcher of history, religious studies, and women studies
- Janet Ågren (born 1949), Swedish actress and model
- Janet Ahlberg (1944–1994), English writer of children's books
- Janet Aitken, several people
- Janet Ajzenstat (born 1936), Canadian professor emeritus of political science
- Janet Akinrinade (1930–1994), Nigerian politician
- Janet Akyüz Mattei (1943–2004), Turkish-American astronomer
- Janet Albrechtsen (born 1966), Australian opinion columnist
- Janet Alcoriza (1918–1998), American screenwriter and actress
- Janet Aldrich (born 1956), American actress and singer
- Janet Alexander (1878–1961), English actress
- Janet Allard, American playwright and theater educator
- Janet Allen, American biochemist and industrial engineer
- Janet Allison, American sex offender
- Janet Amos (born 1944), Canadian actress, educator, playwright, and theater director
- Janet Amponsah (born 1993), Ghanaian sprinter
- Janet Amsden, British actress
- Janet Ancel, American politician
- Janet and Anne Grahame Johnstone (1928–1979), English children's book illustrators
- Janet Anderson (disambiguation), several people
- Janet Andrewartha (1951–2024), Australian television- and theater actress
- Janet Anne Galloway (1841–1909), Scottish activist for women's rights and education
- Janet Arceo (born 1955), Mexican actress, TV presenter, announcer, director, and businesswoman
- Janet Archer (1873–1916), English artist
- Janet Arnold (1932–1998), British clothing historian, costume designer, teacher, conservator, and author
- Janet Arnott (1956–2019), Canadian curler and Olympic champion coach
- Janet Arvizo, American prosecuting witness in the Michael Jackson Trial
- Janet Asimov (1926–2019), American science fiction writer, psychiatrist, and psychoanalyst
- Janet Askew (?–2015), New Zealand nurse
- Janet Auchincloss Rutherfurd (1945–1985), American socialite
- Janet Aulisio, American role-playing game artist
- Janet Austin (born 1956/1957), Canadian non-profit sector executive and public servant
- Janet Awino (born 1985), Kenyan rugby sevens player
- Janet Ayer Fairbank (1878–1951), American author and suffragette
- Janet Babb, American geologist
- Janet Backhouse (1938–2004), English manuscripts curator
- Janet Ruth Bacon (1891–1965), English university principal
- Janet Bagguley, English international footballer
- Janet Baird (born 2000), Australian AFLW player
- Janet Baker (born 1933), English mezzo-soprano
- Janet M. Baker, American academic and speech processing researcher
- Janet Balaskas, South African author and childbirth educator
- Janet Banana (1938–2021), Zimbabwean teacher who became First Lady of Zimbabwe
- Janet Bannister, Canadian business executive and venture capitalist
- Janet Banzet (1934–1971), American actress
- Janet Barlow, several people
- Janet Barnes, British curator and museum director
- Janet Barnett, American professor of mathematics
- Janet Barresi (born 1952), American politician
- Janet Barrowman (1879–1955), Scottish suffragette
- Janet Barth, American radiation engineer
- Janet Basco, Filipino singer
- Janet Bately, British academic
- Janet Bathgate (1806–1898), Scottish writer and schoolteacher
- Janet Baus, American documentary film- and television director, producer, and editor
- Janet Bayly (born 1955), New Zealand photographer, museum director, and curator
- Janet Beat (born 1937), Scottish composer, music educator, and music writer
- Janet Beaton (1519–1569), Scottish aristocrat
- Janet Beavin Bavelas (1940–2022), American experimental social psychologist
- Janet Beecher (1884–1955), American actress
- Janet Beer (born 1956), British academic
- Janet Beery, American mathematician and mathematics historian
- Janet Behan (born 1954), English-Irish writer and actress
- Janet Beihoffer, American accountant
- Janet L. Beizer, American academic
- Janet Bell (born 1959), English middle-distance runner
- Janet Bennion (born 1964), American anthropologist professor
- Janet Benshoof (1947–2017), American human rights lawyer
- Janet Bentley, American dramaturg at the August Strindberg Repertory Theatre
- Janet Bercovitz, American entrepreneurship scholar and professor
- Janet Berliner (1939–2012), American novelist
- Janet Bethune, Scottish wife of James Hamilton, 1st Earl of Arran
- Janet Bewley, several people
- Janet Biehl (born 1953), American artist, author, copyeditor, and translator
- Janet Biggs (born 1959), American artist
- Janet Billig Rich (born 1967), American artist manager, music supervisor, and producer
- Janet Bina Kahama (born 1943), Tanzanian politician
- Janet Birkmyre (born 1966), English track racing cyclist
- Janet Blair (singer-songwriter), American independent pop/Christian singer-songwriter
- Janet Blair (1921–2007), American actress and singer
- Janet Blake (?–1981), American-Canadian agricultural producer and philanthropist
- Janet Bloomfield (men’s rights activist) (born 1979/1980), Canadian men's rights activist
- Janet Bloomfield (1953–2007), British peace- and disarmament campaigner
- Janet Blunt (1859–1950), British folklorist
- Janet Bodnar, American editor and business- and financial journalist
- Janet Bond Arterton (born 1944), American inactive senior district judge
- Janet Bonnema (1938–2008), American civil engineer and women's rights activist
- Janet Bostwick (born 1939), Bahamian lawyer and politician
- Janet M. Box-Steffensmeier, American political scientist and professor
- Janet Boyd (1850–1928), English suffragette, feminist, and women's rights activist
- Janet Boyle (born 1963), Northern Irish high jumper
- Janet Boyman (?–1572), Scottish woman accused of witchcraft
- Janet Brady, Canadian candidate in the New Democratic Party of Manitoba candidates in the 1999 Manitoba provincial election
- Janet Bragg (1907–1993), American aviator
- Janet Braun-Reinitz (1938–2023), American muralist, painter, and activist committed to social justice
- Janet Brehaut (born 1988), New Zealand cricketer
- Janet Brennan Croft (born 1961), American librarian and Tolkien scholar
- Janet Brewster (born 1969/1970), Canadian Inuk politician
- Janet Bronwen Alun Pugh (1930–2017), English fashion model and psychotherapist
- Janet Broughton, American emerita professor of philosophy
- Janet Brown (disambiguation), several people
- Janet Browne (born 1950), British historian of science
- Janet Brumby, English development manager of Young Enterprise
- Janet Buckner, American politician
- Janet Bundi (born 1996), Kenyan footballer
- Janet Burchill (born 1955), Australian contemporary artist
- Janet Burke (born 1962), Jamaican sprinter
- Janet Burroway (born 1936), American author
- Janet Burston (1935–1998), American child actress
- Janet Burton, Welsh professor of medieval history
- Janet S. Butel, American professor of molecular virology and microbiology
- Janet Caird (1913–1992), Malawi-born Scottish teacher and a writer of mysteries, poems, and short stories
- Janet Camilo (born 1971), Dominican Republic lawyer
- Janet Campbell, several people
- Janet Cardiff (born 1957), Canadian artist
- Janet Carlson, American politician
- Janet Carnochan (1839–1926), Canadian historian and teacher
- Janet Carr (psychologist) (1927–2020), English psychologist
- Janet Carr (1933–2014), Australian academic and physiotherapist
- Janet Carroll (1940–2012), American film-, stage-, and television character actress
- Janet Carsten, British professor of social and cultural anthropology
- Janet Carter, New Zealand clinical psychology academic and professor- and dean of science
- Janet Catherine Berlo, American art historian and academic
- Janet Chance (1886–1953), British feminist writer, sex education advocate, and birth control- and abortion law reformer
- Janet Chandler (1911–1994), American model and actress
- Janet Chapman (?–2017), American author
- Janet Charman (born 1954), New Zealand poet
- Janet Cherobon-Bawcom (born 1978), American distance runner
- Janet Chisholm (1929–2004), British Cold War spy
- Janet Chow (born 1983), Hong Kong actress
- Janet Chvatal (born 1964), American soprano
- Janet Clark, several people
- Janet Clarke (1851–1909), Australian socialite and philanthropist
- Janet Coats Black (1844–1918), Scottish poet, philanthropist, and founder of the James Tait Black Memorial Prize
- Janet Coats (born 1963), American media journalism director and executive editor
- Janet Cobbs (born 1967), American/Canadian volleyball coach
- Janet Cochrane (1912–1994), Canadian community organizer and First Nations activist
- Janet Cohen, several people
- Janet Coit, American government official and lawyer
- Janet Coleman (born 1945), British academic and historian of political theory
- Janet Coles (born 1954), American LPGA Tour player
- Janet Collins (1917–2003), American prima ballerina, choreographer, and teacher
- Janet Colquhoun (1781–1846), British religious writer
- Janet Cone (born 1955), American college athletic director
- Janet Conrad (born 1963), American experimental physicist, researcher, and professor
- Janet Cook Lewis (1855–1947), American librarian and book repairer
- Janet Cooke (born 1954), American journalist
- Janet Cooper Alexander (born 1946), American lawyer
- Janet Cornfoot (?–1705), Scottish woman killed for alleged witchcraft
- Janet Cosh (1901–1989), Australian botanist and secondary school teacher
- Janet Coster, English operatic mezzo-soprano
- Janet E. Courtney (1865–1954), English scholar, writer, and feminist
- Janet Cowell (born 1968), American politician
- Janet Cox-Rearick (1930–2018), American art historian and professor of art history
- Janet Craxton (1929–1981), English oboe player and teacher
- Janet Cree (1910–1992), English painter
- Janet Cruz (born 1956), American politician
- Janet Culp (born 1982), American synchronized swimmer
- Janet Currie, Canadian-American economist and professor
- Janet Daby (born 1970), British politician
- Janet Dacal, American actress, singer, and musical theater performer
- Janet Dailey (1944–2013), American author of romance novels
- Janet Daley (born 1944), American-born British journalist
- Janet Daling, American epidemiologist and emeritus professor
- Janet Daly (born 1969), Australian short track speed skater
- Janet Dancey, Canadian oncologist
- Janet Dando, Spanish international lawn bowler
- Janet Darbyshire, British epidemiologist and science administrator
- Janet Davidson (born 1941), New Zealand archaeologist and curator
- Janet Davies, several people
- Janet Davis, Canadian city councillor
- Janet Dawson (writer) (born 1949), American mystery writer
- Janet Dawson (born 1935), Australian artist
- Janet de Coux (1904–1999), American sculptor
- Janet De Gore (1930–2022), American television and theater actress
- Janet Dean Fodor (1942–2023), American professor emerita of linguistics
- Janet Dean (born 1949), English politician
- Janet A. Deatrick, American professor emerita of nursing
- Janet Dees, American curator
- Janet DeLaine, Australian archaeologist
- Janet Delaney (born 1952), American photographer and educator
- Janet Dempsey Steiger (1939–2004), American politician
- Janet Devlin (born 1994), Northern Irish singer and songwriter
- Janet Dhillon, American lawyer
- Janet Dibley (born 1958), English actress
- Janet Dicks (born 1933), American weight thrower
- Janet Dietrich (1926–2008), American pilot
- Janet DiFiore (born 1955), American lawyer and judge
- Janet Doe (1895–1985), American librarian
- Janet L. Dolgin, American legal scholar and professor of health
- Janet Donald (c. 1825–1892), New Zealand church leader
- Janet Doub Erickson (1924–2021), American graphic artist and writer
- Janet Douglas, several people
- Janet Dudley-Eshbach, American academic
- Janet Dunbar, American composer
- Janet Duprey (born 1945), American politician
- Janet Dykman (born 1954), American archer
- Janet Echelman (born 1966), American sculptor and fiber artist
- Janet Ecker (born 1953), Canadian politician
- Janet Edeme, Nigerian agricultural scientist and plant biologist
- Janet Egyir (born 1992), Ghanaian footballer
- Janet Eisner, American college professor emerita
- Janet Eissenstat, American government worker
- Janet D. Elashoff, American statistician
- Janet Elder (1956–2017), American writer, editor, author, and reporter
- Janet Eldred, American professor and author
- Janet Elizabeth Astor, English wife of Charles Gordon-Lennox, 11th Duke of Richmond
- Janet Elizabeth Case (1863–1937), British classical scholar, tutor of ancient Greek, and women's rights advocate
- Janet Elizabeth Macgregor (1920–2005), Scottish physician and cytologist
- Janet Elliott Wulsin (1894–1963), American nurse and explorer
- Janet A. W. Elliott (born 1967), Canadian engineering scientist and researcher in thermodynamics
- Janet Ellis (born 1955), English television presenter, actress, and writer
- Janet Ellis (politician) (born 1956), American politician
- Janet Ellzey, American mechanical engineer
- Janet Ely (born 1953), American diver
- Janet Emerson Bashen (born 1957), American entrepreneur, business consultant, and software inventor
- Janet Emig (born 1928), American composition scholar
- Janet Eremenko, Canadian politician
- Janet Erskine Stuart (1857–1914), English Roman Catholic nun and educator
- Janet Ertel (1913–1988), American member of music group The Chordettes
- Janet Evanovich (born 1943), American writer
- Janet Evans (revolutionary), British revolutionary
- Janet Evans (born 1971), American competition swimmer
- Janet Evra (born 1988), English-born vocalist, bassist, guitarist, songwriter, and bandleader
- Janet Fairbank (1903–1947), American operatic singer
- Janet Fallis, Australian professional tennis player
- Janet Farrar (born 1950), British teacher, author, and Wiccan priestess
- Janet Febisola Adeyemi (born 1958), Nigerian civil engineer and geologist
- Janet Feder, American composer and guitarist
- Janet Fieldhouse (born 1971), Australian ceramic artist
- Janet Fielding (born 1953), Australian actress
- Janet Finch-Saunders (born 1958), Welsh politician
- Janet Finch (born 1946), British sociologist and academic administrator
- Janet Fish (born 1938), American contemporary realist artist
- Janet Fitch (born 1955), American author
- Janet Flanner (1892–1978), American writer and pioneering narrative journalist
- Janet Fletcher, Australian linguist
- Janet Fockart (?–1596), Scottish merchant and moneylender
- Janet Folkes (1959–2012), English balloonist
- Janet Fookes (born 1936), British politician
- Janet Ford (born 1945), British sociologist and university administrator
- Janet Foutty, American businessperson, author, and public speaker
- Janet Fox (author) (1940–2009), American fantasy- and horror writer, poet, teacher, editor, and publisher
- Janet Fox (1912–2002), American actress
- Janet Fragoso Alonso (born 1973), birth name of Mexican professional wrestler Miss Janeth
- Janet Frame (1924–2004), New Zealand author
- Janet Franklin (swimmer) (born 1948), English swimmer
- Janet Franklin (born 1959), German-born American botanist, geographer, and landscape ecologist
- Janet Fraser (1883–1945), New Zealand community leader
- Janet Freeman (1950–2011), American community organizer and activist for tenant's rights
- Janet Friedman (1945–2002), American archaeologist
- Janet Froelich (born 1946), American graphic designer and creative director
- Janet S Gaffney, American-New Zealand academic
- Janet Gardner (born 1962), American rock singer
- Janet Garrett, American candidate in the 2018 United States House of Representatives elections in Ohio
- Janet E. Garvey (born 1953), American ambassador
- Janet Gasparini, Canadian candidate in the 2006 Greater Sudbury municipal election
- Janet Gaylord Moore (1906–1992), American writer, curator, and artist
- Janet Gaymer (born 1947), British civil servant, solicitor, and lawyer
- Janet Gaynor (1906–1984), American actress
- Janet Georges (born 1979), Seychellois weightlifter
- Janet Gerhauser (born 1932), American pair skater
- Janet Gertrude Higgins (1885–1964), birth name of Nettie Palmer, Australian poet, essayist, and literary critic
- Janet Gezari (born 1945), American literary critic and scholar
- Janet Gibson, Belizean biologist and zoologist
- Janet Gillies (1864–1947), New Zealand civilian- and military nurse and army nursing administrator
- Janet Gilsdorf, American pediatric infectious diseases physician, scientist, and writer
- Janet Godfrey, British songwriter
- Janet Godman (born 1966), English cricketer
- Janet Goldner (born 1952), American visual artist
- Janet González Tostado (born 1957), Mexican politician
- Janet Gourlay (1863–1912), Scottish Egyptologist
- Janet Gover, Australian writer of short stories and romance novels
- Janet Grace Akech Okori-Moe (born 1966), Ugandan teacher and politician
- Janet Graham (poet) (1723–1805), Scottish poet
- Janet Graham (born 1948), English composer, music educator, and music therapist
- Janet Gray Hayes (1926–2014), American politician
- Janet Greek (born 1949), American director and writer of film and television
- Janet Green, several people
- Janet Greene (1930–2021), American singer
- Janet Greenip (born 1947), American politician
- Janet Greig (1874–1950), Scottish-Australian anaesthetist
- Janet Grey (born 1952), American soap opera actress
- Janet Grieve (born 1940), New Zealand biological oceanographer
- Janet Grillo, American filmmaker
- Janet Grogan (born 1988), Irish singer and songwriter
- Janet Gulland (1934–2017), British aeronautical engineer
- Janet Gunn (born 1961), American actress
- Janet Gurwitch (born 1954), American businesswoman and investor
- Janet Guthrie (born 1938), American race car driver
- Janet Gyatso, American religious studies scholar
- Janet Haas (born 1953), American professional tennis player
- Janet Hailes Michelmore, Australian business executive and health activist
- Janet Hale, American educational theorist and educator
- Janet Hall, several people
- Janet Halley (born 1952), American legal scholar
- Janet Hamill (born 1945), American poet and spoken word artist
- Janet Hamilton (1795–1873), Scottish poet
- Janet Hanson, American financier
- Janet Harbison (born 1955), Irish harper, composer, teacher, and orchestra director
- Janet Harden (1776-c. 1837), Scottish diarist
- Janet Hardy, American writer and sex educator
- Janet Harris, American NCAA player
- Janet M. Hartley (born 1954), English emeritus professor of international history
- Janet Harvey (born 1967), Canadian curler
- Janet Hatta (born 1953), Japanese actress
- Janet Haworth, Welsh politician
- Janet Healy Weeks (born 1932), American lawyer and judge
- Janet Healy, American animated film producer
- Janet Heenan (born 1969), New Zealand rugby union player
- Janet E. Helms, American research psychologist
- Janet Hemingway (born 1957), British infectious diseases specialist
- Janet Henderson (born 1957), Welsh Anglican priest and former nurse
- Janet Hendry (1906–2004), Scottish aviator
- Janet Henfrey (born 1935), English stage- and television actress
- Janet Henry (artist), American visual artist
- Janet Henry (economist) (born 1969), British economist
- Janet Hergt, Australian geochemist
- Janet Hering (born 1958), American academic and environmental scientist
- Janet Hetherington (born 1955), Canadian writer and artist
- Janet Hill Gordon (1915–1990), American lawyer and politician
- Janet Hiller (born 1953), Australian epidemiologist and health services researcher
- Janet Hills, British police detective
- Janet Hilton (born 1945), English clarinet soloist, teacher, chamber performer, and orchestral musician
- Janet Hinostroza, Ecuadorian television journalist
- Janet Hitchman (1916–1980), English writer
- Janet Hobhouse (1948–1991), American novelist, biographer, and editor
- Janet Hoek, New Zealand academic and professor of public health
- Janet Susan Mary Hoffmann (born 1938), birth name of Viva (actress), American actress, writer, and former Warhol superstar
- Janet Hogan (born 1945), Australian swimmer
- Janet Holborow, New Zealand mayor
- Janet Holder, Canadian business executive
- Janet Holm (1923–2018), New Zealand environmental activist and historian
- Janet Holmes, several people
- Janet L. Holmgren, American linguist, professor and administrator
- Janet Hong, Canadian translator
- Janet Honour (born 1950), English athlete
- Janet Hopner (born 1936), Australian fencer
- Janet Hopps Adkisson (born 1934), American professional tennis player
- Janet Horne (?–1727), Scottish woman executed for witchcraft
- Janet C. Howard, American politician
- Janet Howell (1944–2026), American politician
- Janet Hsieh (born 1980), Taiwanese-American television personality, actress, producer, violinist, and author
- Janet Hubert (born 1956), American film- and television actress
- Janet Huckabee (born 1955), American politician
- Janet Hunter, English candidate in the 2004 North Tyneside Metropolitan Borough Council election
- Janet Huntington Brewster (1910–1998), American philanthropist, writer, radio broadcaster, and relief worker
- Janet Hürlimann, Canadian-Swiss curler and curling coach
- Janet Hurst (born c. 1947), British microbiologist, editor, and science educator
- Janet Husband, British emeritus professor of radiology
- Janet Iacobuzio (born 1962), American television soap opera writer
- Janet Irwin (1923–2009), New Zealand medical practitioner
- Janet Iwasa (born 1978), American data visualization expert and assistant professor of biochemistry
- Janet Jackson (golfer) (1891–1960), Irish golfer
- Janet Jackson (born 1966), American singer, songwriter, dancer, and actress
- Janet E. Jackson, American judge
- Janet Jacobs (1928–2017), American baseball player
- Janet L. Jacobs (born 1948), American sociologist
- Janet Jagan (1920–2009), American-born Guyanese politician
- Janet Jakobsen, American professor, academic, and scholar of gender and sexuality
- Janet Wilson James (1918–1987), American historian, educator, and pioneer
- Janet Jamieson (born 1927), American professional baseball player
- Janet Jansson, American biological scientist
- Janet Jenkins, American woman who went to court
- Janet Jennings (1842–1917), American nurse and reporter
- Janet Jesudason (born 1936), Singaporean sprinter
- Janet Johnson, several people
- Janet Jones (disambiguation), several people
- Janet Jonsson (born 1977), Swedish snowboarder
- Janet J. Joyce (1940–2015), American farmer and politician
- Janet Joyce, American novelist
- Janet Julian (born 1959), American educator, author, and actress
- Janet Kagan (1946–2008), American author
- Janet Kalven (1913–2014), American Catholic educator and writer
- Janet Kaplan (born 1958), American poet and professor
- Janet Karim (born 1954), Malawian journalist and diplomat
- Janet Karin (born 1938), Australian ballerina
- Janet Karvonen (born 1962), American basketball player
- Janet Kauffman (born 1945), American Mennonite novelist, poet, mixed media artist, and academic
- Janet L. Kavandi (born 1959), American scientist and NASA astronaut
- Janet Kay Jensen (born 1951), American author
- Janet Kay (born 1958), English actress and vocalist
- Janet Kear (1933–2004), English ornithologist and conservationist
- Janet Keeping, Canadian politician
- Janet Kelso (born 1975), South African computational biologist
- Janet Kennedy (designer) (1934–2021), British print designer
- Janet Kennedy (c. 1480-c. 1545), Scottish noble, and mistress of King James IV of Scotland
- Janet Kerdikoshvili (born 1991), American model, singer, and beauty pageant titleholder
- Janet Key (1945–1992), English actress
- Janet Khan (born 1940), Australian author
- Janet Khoo (born 1973), Malaysian TV drama- and film actress
- Janet Kidder (born 1972), Canadian actress
- Janet Kigusiuq (1926–2005), Inuk artist
- Janet Kirkland Starr, American politician
- Janet Kisa (born 1992), Kenyan professional middle- and long-distance runner
- Janet Kitz (1930–2019), Scottish-born Canadian educator, author, and historian
- Janet Kohan-Sedq (1945–1972), Iranian athlete
- Janet L. Kolodner, American cognitive- and learning scientist
- Janet Koper (1931–1988), Canadian politician
- Janet Koth, American homemaker and contestant on Survivor (American TV series)
- Janet Kozyra, American heliophysicist
- Janet Krupin (born 1987), American actress, singer, writer, and producer
- Janet Kukuk (1942–2000), American politician
- Janet Lacey (1903–1988), English charity director and philanthropist
- Janet Lagasse, American professional tennis player
- Janet Lam (born 1964), spouse of Chief Executive of Hong Kong
- Janet Lambert (1893–1973), American actress and author
- Janet Land (born 1956), Canadian film- and television actress
- Janet Tai Landa, Canadian economist, researcher, and professor
- Janet Landgard (born 1947), American actress and model
- Janet Lane-Claypon (1877–1967), English physician
- Janet Langhart (born 1941), American television journalist, anchor, and author
- Janet Langsam (born 1935), American cultural activist
- Janet Lansburgh (1911–1973), American screenwriter and director
- Janet Laurence (author) (born 1937), British author and cookery writer
- Janet Laurence (born 1947), Australian artist
- Janet Lauritsen, American criminologist and professor
- Janet LaValley, American past member of alternative rock band Tribe (band)
- Janet Lawless (born 1985), South African athlete
- Janet Lawson (1940–2021), American jazz singer and educator
- Janet Leach (appropriate adult), English social worker
- Janet Leach (1918–1997), American studio potter
- Janet Leahy, American television executive producer and writer
- Janet Leathem, New Zealand psychology academic
- Janet Lee (disambiguation), several people
- Janet Lee Stevens (1950–1983), American journalist
- Janet Lees Price (1943–2012), British actress
- Janet Lembke (1933–2013), American author, essayist, naturalist, translator, and scholar
- Janet Leon (born 1990), Swedish singer, songwriter, and A&R
- Janet Leung (born 1994), Canadian Olympian and NPF player
- Janet Lever (born 1946), American sociologist and professor emerita of sociology
- Janet K. Levit, American law professor, attorney, and university administrator
- Janet Lewis (disambiguation), several people
- Janet Leys Shaw Mactavish (1925–1972), Canadian architect
- Janet Liang (1987–2012), American health advocate and activist
- Janet Lilly (born 1957), American modern dancer and choreographer
- Janet Lilo (born 1982), New Zealand visual artist
- Janet Lim (c. 1923 – 2014), Hong Kong–born Singaporean writer and nurse
- Janet Lim-Napoles (born 1964), Chinese-Filipino businesswoman and convict
- Janet Lindup, South African ballet dancer
- Janet Lippincott (1918–2007), American artist
- Janet Little (1759–1813), Scottish poet
- Janet Livingstone (1643–1696), Scottish activist against religious persecution
- Janet Lockton (born 1942), American politician
- Janet Long (born 1944), American politician and educator
- Janet Looker, English lord mayor and solicitor of York
- Janet Love (born 1957), South African civil servant, activist, and politician
- Janet Lowe (1940–2019), American journalist, newspaper editor, and writer
- Janet Lucroy, American visual artist
- Janet Luhmann (born 1946), American physicist
- Janet Lunn (1928–2017), Canadian children's book writer
- Janet Lupo, American 1975 Playboy model
- Janet Lusk (1924–1994), Scottish social worker
- Janet Lynn Skinner (born 1955), American gospel musician
- Janet Lynn (born 1953), American figure skater
- Janet Mackenzie (New Zealand teacher) (1878–1962), Scottish-born New Zealand schoolteacher
- Janet Mackenzie, daughter of Colin Cam Mackenzie, 11th of Kintail
- Janet Mackenzie (born 1962), British Anglican priest and former teacher
- Janet Mackey (born 1953), New Zealand politician
- Janet MacLachlan (1933–2010), American actress
- Janet Maguire (born 1927), American composer
- Janet Mahoney (born 1938), English actress
- Janet Main (born 1989), New Zealand basketball player
- Janet Malcolm (1934–2021), American writer, staff journalist, and collagist
- Janet Mansfield (1934–2013), Australian potter, publisher, and author
- Janet Manyowa (born 1985), Zimbabwean gospel musician
- Janet Maratita (born 1965/1966), Northern Mariana Islands politician
- Janet March (1963–1996), American children's book illustrator and murder victim
- Janet Marder, American rabbi
- Janet Margolin (1943–1993), American actress
- Janet Marie Rogers (born 1963), Canadian First Nations Mohawk/Tuscarora writer and poet
- Janet Marion Martin (1938–2023), American professor
- Janet Marlow (born 1958), British middle-distance runner
- Janet Martin Welch, American librarian
- Janet Martin, American film actress and singer
- Janet Mary Lord, British biologist and professor
- Janet Mary Riley (1915–2008), American civil rights activist and law professor
- Janet Mary Salsbury (1881–1951), British composer, music educator, and organist
- Janet Maslin (born 1949), American journalist
- Janet Mathews (1914–1992), Australian pianist, music teacher, and documenter of Aboriginal music, language, and culture
- Janet Matthews, Australian artist
- Janet Maw (born 1954), English actress
- Janet May Buchanan (1866–1912), Scottish Egyptologist
- Janet Mayo (1915–1995), Australian advocate for war widows
- Janet Mbabazi (born 1996), Ugandan cricketer
- Janet Mbene (born 1952), Tanzanian politician
- Janet Mbugua (born 1984), Kenyan media personality, anchor, and actress
- Janet McAdams (born 1957), American poet
- Janet McCabe, American attorney and academic
- Janet McCallum, several people
- Janet McCalman (born 1948), Australian social historian, population researcher, and author
- Janet McCarter Woolley (1906–1996), American bacteriologist
- Janet McCloud (1934–2003), Native American indigenous rights activist
- Janet J. McCoy (1916–1995), American politician and businesswoman
- Janet McCracken, American philosopher and professor
- Janet McCredie (1935–2023), Australian radiologist
- Janet McDonald (1953–2007), American writer and attorney
- Janet McDonald (mathematician) (1905–2006), American mathematician and professor
- Janet McEwan (1860–1921), British politician
- Janet McIntyre, New Zealand television journalist, reporter, and producer
- Janet McKenzie, American artist
- Janet McKenzie Hill (1852–1933), American practitioner of culinary reform, food science, and scientific cooking
- Janet McLachlan (born 1977), Canadian wheelchair basketball player
- Janet McLean, New Zealand law academic and professor
- Janet McNaughton (born 1953), Canadian writer
- Janet McNeill (1907–1994), Irish novelist and playwright
- Janet McTeer (born 1961), English actress
- Janet McVeagh (1941–2005), New Zealand disability worker, environmentalist, and politician
- Janet Mead (1937–2022), Australian Catholic nun
- Janet Meakin Poor (1929–2017), American landscape designer
- Janet Meik Wright (born 1946), American legal scholar and attorney
- Janet Melville (born 1958), English golfer
- Janet Merlo (born 1963), Canadian police officer and autobiographer
- Janet E. Mertz (born 1949), American biochemist, molecular biologist, and cancer researcher
- Janet Metcalf (born 1935), American politician
- Janet Millett (1821–1904), English writer
- J. M. A. Mills (1894–1986), English theosophist writer and clerk
- Janet M. Mills (c. 1921–1991), American politician
- Janet E. Minor, Canadian law officer
- Janet Mitchell, several people
- Janet Mock (born 1983), American writer, television host, director, producer, and transgender rights activist
- Janet Monach Patey (1842–1894), English concert- and oratorio contralto
- Janet Mondlane (born 1934), American-born Mozambican activist
- Janet Monge, American curator, physical anthropologist, and scientist
- Janet Montgomerie, Countess of Eglinton (c. 1854–1923), Australian-born Scottish countess and Red Cross administrator
- Janet Montgomery (disambiguation), several people
- Janet Moore (1880–1968), New Zealand civilian- and army nurse, nursing administrator, and hospital matron
- Janet Moreau (1927–2021), American track and field athlete
- Janet Morgan (squash player) (1921–1990), English squash player
- Janet Morgan Riggs (born c. 1955), American psychologist and academic administrator
- Janet Morgan, Lady Balfour of Burleigh (born 1945), Canadian-born English writer and historian
- Janet Morin (born 1975), Canadian gymnast
- Janet Morison Miller (1891–1946), Canadian lawyer
- Janet Morley, English author, poet, and Christian feminist
- Janet Morris (born 1946), American author and defense analyst
- Janet Morrison, Canadian academic administrator
- Janet Morrissey, Canadian figure skating champion
- Janet Morton (born 1963), Canadian visual artist
- Janet Moses (?-2007), New Zealand woman killed for exorcism
- Janet Mullarney (1952–2020), Irish artist and sculptor
- Janet G. Mullins Grissom (1949–2023), American lobbyist
- Janet Munsil, Canadian playwright
- Janet Munyarryun, Aboriginal dancer
- Janet Murguía (born 1960), American civil rights activist
- Janet Murphy (born 1965), Canadian curler
- Janet Myhre, American statistician
- Janet Napolitano (born 1957), American lawyer and politician
- Janet Nathan (1938–2020), British visual artist
- Janet Neel Cohen, Baroness Cohen of Pimlico (born 1940), British lawyer and crime fiction writer
- Janet T. Neff (born 1945), American senior district judge
- Janet Nelson (born 1942), British historian and emerita professor
- Janet Newberry (born 1953), American professional tennis player
- Janet Nguyen (born 1976), American politician
- Janet Nichols Lynch (born 1952), American author, pianist, and teacher
- Janet Niven (1902–1974), British histologist and pathologist
- Janet Nkubana, Rwandan basket weaver
- Janet Noble (born 1940), American playwright, screenwriter, and journalist
- Janet L. Norwood (1923–2015), American statistician
- Janet Nosworthy, Jamaican judge
- Janet Nungnik (born 1954), Inuk textile artist
- Janet Nutter (born 1953), Canadian diver
- Janet Nwadiogo Mokelu (1910–2003), Nigerian politician, philanthropist, nurse, teacher, headmistress, and businesswoman
- Janet W. O'Brien, American politician
- Janet O'Sullivan (born 1974/1975), Irish pro-choice campaigner
- Janet Okala (1894–1971), Nigerian political leader
- Janet Okell (1922–2005), English wargamer
- Janet Okelo (born 1992), Kenyan rugby sevens player
- Janet Olson, American electrical engineer and electronic design automation industry executive
- Janet Omorogbe (born 1942), Nigerian sprinter
- Janet Ong'era, Kenyan politician
- Janet Oppenheim (1948–1994), American historian
- Janet Osgerby (1963–2020), British swimmer
- Janet G. Osteryoung (1939–2021), American chemist
- Janet Otieno (born 1977), Kenyan gospel music singer and songwriter
- Janet Owen Thomas (1961–2002), British composer and organist
- Janet S. Owens, American candidate in the 2006 Maryland Comptroller election
- Janet Owusu (born 1991), Ghanaian footballer
- Janet Paisley (1948–2018), Scottish writer, poet, and playwright
- Janet Pancho Gupta (born 1976), Filipino artist and photographer
- Janet Panic (born 1970), Métis singer, guitarist, and songwriter
- Janet Paraskeva (born 1946), British government official
- Janet Parker (1938–1978), British medical photographer who was the last recorded person to die from smallpox
- Janet Parshall (born 1950), American Christian radio talk show host
- Janet Paschal (born 1956), American inspirational gospel vocalist
- Janet Patterson (1956–2016), Australian costume- and production designer
- Janet Paul (1919–2004), New Zealand publisher, painter, and art historian
- Janet Pavek (1936–2009), American operatic soprano and musical theater actress
- Janet Payne Bowles (1872/1873 – 1948), American art educator, metalsmith, and jewelry designer
- Janet Peckinpaugh (born 1950), American television anchor, reporter, business owner, and political candidate
- Janet Peery (born 1948), American short story writer and novelist
- Janet Peoples, American screenwriter
- Janet Perlman (born 1954), Canadian animator, author, and illustrator
- Janet Perr, American art director, graphic designer, author, and illustrator
- Janet Perry (born 1947), American operatic soprano
- Janet Petersen (born 1970), American politician
- Janet Petro (born 1960), American engineer and civil servant
- Janet Philip (1876–1959), British baroness and journalist
- Janet Pierce (born 1947), Scottish-born Irish painter
- Janet Pierrehumbert (born 1954), American professor of linguistics
- Janet Pilgrim, several people
- Janet Planet (Grace Stephenson), Australian member of indie electro pop band Confidence Man (band)
- Janet Plowe (c. 1905–2018), American biologist
- Greta and Janet Podleski, Canadian author, chef, and television presenter
- Janet Polasky, American presidential professor of history
- Janet Porter (born 1962), American anti-abortion activist and author
- Janet Poss (died 2019), American politician
- Janet Powell (1942–2013), Australian politician
- Janet Pressley, American singer-songwriter
- Janet Price (born 1938), Welsh soprano
- Janet Protasiewicz (born 1962), American attorney and jurist
- Janet Quigley (1902–1987), British radio broadcaster
- Janet Quin-Harkin (born 1941), British novelist and dance teacher
- Janet Quist, American 1978 Playboy model
- Janet Radünzel (born 1973), German rower
- Janet Ramus, real name of Cookie (singer), British soul singer
- Janet Ray Michie (1934–2008), Scottish speech therapist and politician
- Janet Reed (1916–2000), American ballerina and ballet mistress
- Janet Reger (1935–2005), British lingerie designer and businesswoman
- Janet Rehnquist (born 1957), American inspector general
- Janet Reno (1938–2016), American lawyer and attorney general
- Janet Rice (born 1960), Australian politician
- Janet Richard (born 1998), Maltese athlete
- Janet Richards, several people
- Janet Rideout (born 1939), American organic chemist
- Janet Ritterman (born 1941), Australian-educated British college director
- Janet Roach, Australian contestant on The Real Housewives of Melbourne
- Janet Robertson (born 1965), Argentine-born Falkland Islands politician
- Janet Robin (born 1966), American guitarist, singer, songwriter, film- and television composer, and guitar coach
- Janet L. Robinson (born 1950), American executive
- Janet Roitman, American anthropologist
- Janet Romano-Zicari (born 1976/1977), birth name of Lizzy Borden (actress), American pornographic actress and professional wrestler
- Janet Ronalds (born 1985), Australian-born German physiotherapist and cricketer
- Janet Rono (born 1988), Kenyan long-distance runner
- Janet Rosenberg (landscape architect), Canadian landscape architect
- Janet Ross (1842–1927), English historian, biographer, and Tuscan cookbook author
- Janet Rossant (born 1950), English developmental biologist
- Janet Routledge, Canadian politician
- Janet Rowley (1925–2013), American human geneticist
- Janet Royall, Baroness Royall of Blaisdon (born 1955), British politician
- Janet Rumsey (1931–2008), American AAGPBL pitcher
- Janet Russell Perkins (1853–1933), American botanist
- Janet Ruttenberg (born 1931), American painter
- Janet Ryder (born 1955), Welsh politician
- Janet Rzewnicki (born 1953), American politician and businesswoman
- Janet A. Sanderson (born 1955), American diplomat and adjunct professor of international relations
- Janet Sape (1959–2017), Papua New Guinean business leader, international netball player, coach, and administrator
- Janet Sarbanes, American author and a professor of creative writing and cultural studies
- Janet Sassoon (born 1963), American ballet dancer and teacher
- Janet Sawbridge (1947–2021), British ice dancer and figure skating coach
- Janet Sawicki, American cancer researcher and professor emeritus
- Janet Scarfe (born 1947), Australian academic and historian
- Janet Schaw (1730-1740 – 1800), Scottish traveler and diarist
- Janet Schulman (1933–2011), American author of children's books and editor
- Janet Schuster (born c. 1961), Canadian Paralympic and visually-impaired cross-country skier and physiotherapist
- Janet Scicluna, British businessperson
- Janet Scott, several people
- Janet Scudder (1869–1940), American sculptor and painter
- Janet Seeley (1905–1987), American college professor
- Janet Seidel (1955–2017), Australian jazz vocalist and pianist
- Janet Semple (born 1955), South African politician
- Janet Seymour-Smith (1930–1998), English translator and scholar
- Janet Shackleton (1928–2021), New Zealand hurdler
- Janet Shamlian (born 1962), American television reporter and correspondent
- Janet Shaw, several people
- Janet Sheather (1912–1945), Canadian swimmer
- Janet Sheen (born 1944), American actress
- Janet Shibley Hyde, British psychologist and professor
- Janet Siefert, American biologist
- Janet Simkin, British lichenologist
- Janet Simpson (1944–2010), English sprinter
- Janet Sinsheimer (1957–2023), American expert in statistical genetics
- Janet Sision, Kenyan actress
- Janet Smith, several people
- Janet Smylie, Métis family medicine physician
- Janet Snyder Matthews, American historian and author
- Janet Sobel (1893–1968), Ukrainian-born American painter
- Janet Soergel Mielke (born 1937), American politician and secretary
- Janet Sorg Stoltzfus (1931–2004), American educator
- Janet Soskice (born 1951), Canadian-born English Roman Catholic theologian and philosopher
- Janet Souto (born 1967), Spanish professional tennis player
- Janet D. Spector (1944–2011), American archaeologist
- Janet Spens (1876–1963), Scottish literary scholar
- Janet Sprent (born 1934), British botanical scientist and emeritus professor
- Janet L. Springer, American ballet dancer, artistic director, choreographer, and specialist in classical ballet
- Janet Sprintall, Australian-born American oceanographer
- Janet Staiger (born 1946), American professor emeritus of communication
- Janet Stancomb-Wills (1854–1932), British mayor and philanthropist
- Janet Stavinga, Canadian mayor
- Janet E. Steele, American author and professor of journalism
- Janet Steinbeck (born 1951), Australian competitive swimmer
- Janet Stephens, American hairstyle archaeologist
- Janet Sternburg (born 1943), American writer, poet, and photographer
- Janet Stevenson (1913–2009), American writer, teacher, and social activist
- Janet Stewart, several people
- Janet Strayer, German curler
- Janet Street-Porter (born 1946), English broadcaster, journalist, writer, and media personality
- Janet Stuart Oldershaw Durham (1879–1969), American suffragist, clubwoman, lawyer, and politician
- Janet Stumbo (born 1954), American associate justice
- Janet Sung, American classical violinist
- Janet Sutherland (born 1957), English poet
- Janet Suzman (born 1939), South African-born British actress
- Janet M. Suzuki (1943–1987), Japanese-American librarian
- Janet Tamaro, American television writer, series creator, executive producer, and showrunner
- Janet Tashjian (born 1956), American writer
- Janet Taylor Lisle (born 1947), American writer
- Janet Taylor Pickett (born 1948), American artist
- Janet Taylor Spence (1923–2015), American psychologist
- Janet Taylor (1804–1870), English astronomer, navigation expert, mathematician, and meteorologist
- Janet Tedstone (born 1959), English cricketer
- Janet Teissier du Cros (1905–1990), Scottish writer, translator, broadcaster, and pianist
- Janet Tempest (1930–2021), Argentine-born British landowner and Catholic philanthropist
- Janet Thomas, Australian mathematician and educator
- Janet Thompson, several people
- Janet Thomson (born 1942), English geologist and Antarctic researcher
- Janet Thornton (born 1949), British senior scientist and director emeritus
- Janet Thurlow (1926–2022), American jazz singer
- Janet Tibbits (born 1967), Australian swimmer
- Janet Tobias, American film director, producer, and screenwriter
- Janet E. Tobitt (1898–1984), British-American author, editor, publisher, music director, collector of folk songs and dances, playwright, teacher, Girl Guide and Girl Scout leader, and shepherd's pipe player
- Janet Todd (born 1942), British academic and author
- Janet Todd (kickboxer) (born 1985), American Muay Thai kickboxer
- Janet Toro (born 1963), Chilean performance artist
- Janet G. Travell (1901–1997), American physician and medical researcher
- Janet Treasure (born 1952), British psychiatrist
- Janet Trevelyan (1879–1956), British writer, social campaigner, and fundraiser
- Janet Trotter (born 1943), English academic and administrator
- Janet Trujillo, American politician
- Janet Truncale, American business executive
- Janet Turner, multiple people
- Janet E. Turner (1914–1988), American artist
- Janet Tyler (nurse) (born 1933), Australian registered nurse
- Janet van de Graaf (born 1965), Canadian improv artist and television actress
- Janet Varney, American actress, comedian, and voice artist
- Janet Vasconzuelos (born 1969), Peruvian volleyball player
- Janet Vaughan (1899–1993), British physiologist, academic, and academic administrator
- Janet Velie (1895–1992), American actress
- Janet Vernon, Australian wife of dancer and choreographer Graeme Murphy
- Janet Vestal Kelly (born 1976), American politician
- Janet Vidhi (born 1995), Indian professional squash player
- Janet Vitmayer (born 1952), British museum director
- Janet Vogel, American past member of doo-wop group The Skyliners
- Janet Waldo (1919–2016), American actress and voice artist
- Janet Walker, Canadian legal scholar, author, and professor
- Janet Walker (costumier) (1850–1940), Australian costumier and businesswoman
- Janet Wall (born 1949), American politician
- Janet Wallach (born 1942), American writer
- Janet Wallis (1858–1928), British philanthropist
- Janet Wang, Canadian visual artist and educator based in Vancouver
- Janet Wanja (1984–2024), Kenyan volleyball player
- Janet Ward (1925–1995), American actress
- Janet Waring (1870–1941), American art historian
- Janet Watson (1923–1985), English geologist
- Janet Watson (linguist) (born 1959), British linguist, academic, and phonologist
- Janet Watt (born 1952), New Zealand badminton player
- Janet Webb (1930–1983), English actress
- Janet Weinberg (1955–2018), American LGBTQ activist, advocate for people with HIV/AIDS, and disability rights advocate
- Janet Weiss (born 1965), American rock drummer
- Janet Welch (1894–1959), English doctor
- Janet Wells (born 1957), New Zealand alpine skier
- Janet Wentz (1937–2003), American politician
- Janet F. Werker, Canadian researcher of developmental psychology
- Janet Werner (born 1959), Canadian artist
- Janet Wesonga (born c. 1928), Ugandan local politician
- Janet Wheeler (born 1957), British composer and choral conductor
- Janet Whitaker, Baroness Whitaker (born 1936), British politician
- Janet Wilder Dakin (1910–1994), American philanthropist and zoologist
- Janet Wiley (1933–2010), American AAGPBL player
- Janet Williams, several people
- Janet Williamson (1862–1936), New Zealand nurse
- Janet Wilmshurst (born 1966), New Zealand palaeoecologist
- Janet Wilson (born 1948), New Zealand academic
- Janet Wishart (?–1597), Scottish accused witch
- Janet Wittes, American statistician
- Janet G. Woititz (1938–1994), American psychologist and researcher
- Janet Wolfe (1933–1951), American professional wrestler
- Janet C. Wolfenbarger (born 1958), American Air Force general
- Janet L. Wolff (1920–2014), American advertising executive
- Janet Wolfson de Botton (born 1952), British art collector and philanthropist
- Janet S. Wong, American poet and author of children's books
- Janet Woodcock (born 1948), American physician and pharmacologist
- Janet Woods (1912–1998), English photographer and hostess
- Janet Woollacott (1939–2011), English-born French singer
- Janet Woollard (born 1955), Australian politician
- Janet Wright (1945–2016), English-born Canadian actress and theater director
- Janet Wu, American TV presenter, journalist, and teacher
- Janet Yale, Canadian telecommunications lawyer and association executive
- Janet K. Yamamoto, American immunologist
- Janet Yang Rohr, American politician
- Janet Yang (born 1956), American film producer
- Janet Yates, Northern Irish archer
- Janet Yawson (born 1957), Ghanaian long jumper
- Janet Yee (1934–2019), Singaporean social worker and children's rights advocate
- Janet Yellen (born 1946), American economist
- Janet Young, several people
- Janet Zaph Briggs (1912–1974), American metallurgist
- Janet Zarish (born 1954), American actress, director, and teacher
- Janet Zollinger Giele (born 1934), American sociologist and professor emerita
- Janet Zweig (born 1950), American artist

== People with the given name Janat ==
- Janat Ansari (born 1970), Nepalese politician
- Janat Gul, alternate name of Hammdidullah, Afghan prisoner of the U.S.
- Janat Gul (cricketer) (born 1991), Afghan cricketer
- Janat Mukwaya (born 1951), Ugandan politician

== People with the given name Janeth ==
- Janeth Arcain (born 1969), Brazilian WNBA player
- Janeth Caizalitín (born 1974), Ecuadorian athlete
- Janeth Jepkosgei (born 1983), Kenyan middle-distance runner
- Janeth Magufuli (born 1960), Tanzanian educator and former First Lady of Tanzania
- Janeth Morón (born 1988), Bolivian footballer
- Janeth Mumtaz Deen, Australian community figure
- Janeth Pangamwene (born 2000), Tanzanian professional footballer
- Janeth Shija, Tanzanian professional footballer

== People with the given name Żaneta ==
- Żaneta Glanc (born 1983), Polish discus thrower
- Żaneta Skowrońska (born 1979), Polish dressage rider

== Fictional characters with the given name Janet ==
- Janet, in the Scottish border ballad "Tam Lin". She is alternately named "Margaret" in many versions.
- Janet, in the US fantasy comedy TV series The Good Place, played by D'Arcy Carden
- Janet, in the UK children's drama TV series Grange Hill, played by Stella Haime
- Janet, in the video game Brawl Stars
- Janet, in the video game Quake Live
- Janet Barch, in the US adult animated sitcom Daria, voiced by Ashley Albert
- Janet Barlow, in the UK soap opera Coronation Street, played by Judith Barker
- Janet Bergman Collins, in the US TV soap opera Search for Tomorrow, played by Marian Hailey, Sandy Robinson, Fran Sharon, Ellen Spencer, and Millee Taggart
- Janet Bhai, in the Japanese manga and anime Black Lagoon, voiced by Miki Nagasawa (Japanese) and Kelly Sheridan (English)
- Janet Buckley, in the UK play Peril at End House, played by Nancy Poultney (1940) and Joan Hart (1945)
- Janet Chant, in Diana Wynne Jones' Chrestomanci fantasy novel series
- Janet Ciccone, in the US soap opera As the World Turns, played by Julie Pinson
- Janet Cruise, in the 1988 US science fiction film Mac and Me, played by Christine Ebersole
- Janet Cunningham, in the 2009 US horror film The Final Destination, played by Haley Webb
- Janet Darling, in the US teen sitcom Clarissa Explains It All, played by Elizabeth Hess
- Janet Dawkins, in the UK TV sitcom My Hero, played by Emily Joyce
- Janet Dent, in the UK soap opera Coronation Street, played by Linda Clark
- Janet Drake, Tim Drake's mother
- Janet Fraiser, in the science fiction TV series Stargate SG-1, played by Teryl Rothery
- Janet Garrison, The name Garrison from South Park uses during his time as a transgender woman
- Janet Gavin, in the US comedy-drama TV series Rescue Me, played by Andrea Roth
- Janet Green, in the soap opera All My Children, played by Kate Collins, Melody Anderson, and Robin Mattson
- Janet Keogh, in the UK TV sitcom Two Pints of Lager and a Packet of Crisps, played by Sheridan Smith
- Janet Kim, in the Canadian TV sitcom Kim's Convenience, played by Andrea Bang
- Janet King, several characters
- Janet Kirk, in the Australian TV soap opera Neighbours, played by Roberta Connelly
- Janet Meadows, in the US drama TV series October Road, played by Rebecca Field
- Janet Mitchell, in the soap opera EastEnders, played by child actress Grace
- Janet Nelson Jr., in the animated TV series Johnny Test, voiced by Kathleen Barr
- Janet Nettles, the mayor in Scooby-Doo! Mystery Incorporated
- Janet O'Flynn, in the 2009 film Survival of the Dead, played by Kathleen Munroe
- Janet Pearson, in the 1989 US independent coming-of-age comedy film She's Out of Control, played by Catherine Hicks
- Janet Petty, in the US TV series The Flash, played by Bethany Brown
- Janet Reid, in the UK TV soap opera Coronation Street, played by Judith Barker
- Janet Scott, in the UK TV series Scott & Bailey, played by Lesley Sharp
- Janet Sosna, in the US teen drama TV series Beverly Hills, 90210, played by Lindsay Price
- Janet St. Clair, in the UK children's drama TV series Grange Hill, played by Simone Nylander
- Janet Stein, in Pride (comics)
- Janet Thompson, in the film serial The Adventures of Smilin' Jack, played by Marjorie Lord
- Janet van Dyne, a.k.a. the Wasp, in the Marvel Universe
- Janet Weiss, in the 1975 independent musical comedy horror film The Rocky Horror Picture Show, played by Susan Sarandon
- Janet Wood, in the US TV sitcom Three's Company, played by Joyce DeWitt
- Janet York, in the US TV series 24, played by Jacqui Maxwell
