= Janet Barlow =

Janet Barlow may refer to:

- Janet Barlow (scientist), Scottish professor of environmental physics
- Janet Barlow (Coronation Street), fictional character on Coronation Street, played by Judith Barker
