= Janet Montgomery (disambiguation) =

Janet Montgomery (born 1985) is a British actress.

Janet Montgomery may also refer to:

- Janet Montgomery (archaeologist), British professor
- Janet Montgomerie, Countess of Eglinton (1854–1923), British Red Cross administrator
