= Janet Roitman =

Janet Roitman is an American anthropologist. She is the co-founder of the Platform Economies Research Network. Roitman is a professor at RMIT University, an Associate Investigator with the Centre of Excellence for Automated Decision-Making and Society (ADM+S), and co-director of the Digital Ethnography Research Centre. She is also a member of the Council of Advisors for the Platform Cooperativism Consortium, New York.

From 2007 to 2022, Roitman was University Professor at The New School in New York City. Before that time, Roitman was a research fellow with the Centre National de la Recherche Scientifique (CNRS), a member of the Institut Marcel-Mauss (CNRS-EHESS, GSPM), and an instructor at the Fondation Nationale des Sciences Politiques (Sciences po) in Paris.

Roitman's research focuses on the anthropology of value, economization, and emergent forms of the political. Her research has received support from The Ford Foundation, The MacArthur Foundation, The American Council of Learned Societies, the Agence Française du Développement, The Institute for Public Knowledge, and The US National Science Foundation.

Roitman has conducted extensive research in Central Africa, focusing on the borders of Cameroon, Nigeria, the Central African Republic, and Chad. Her first book, Fiscal Disobedience: An Anthropology of Economic Regulation in Central Africa (Princeton University Press, 2005), is an analysis of the unregulated commerce that transpires on those borders. This book is an anthropology of taxation and economic regulation. It is a study of unregulated commerce on the borders of Nigeria, Cameroon, and Chad that documents emergent forms of economic value and the consequential transformations in state governance – ultimately raising questions about the relevance and normative consequences of claims about “state failure” on the African continent.

Roitman's second book, “Anti-Crisis” (Duke University Press, 2013), is the first systematic account of how the concept of crisis functions as a blind spot in contemporary analyses of finance and economics. Anti-Crisis investigates the concept of crisis as an object of knowledge and social inquiry, demonstrating its significance as a foundational concept for our understanding and management of contemporary practices, taking The Great Recession of 2007–08 as a case study. This study illustrates how crisis talk diverts our attention away from primary, constitutional questions, such as how debt is constituted as a form of value.

Roitman's current research inquires into digital financial technology payments platforms as potential sources of new asset classes and domestic capital markets on the African continent, which gives insight into emerging socio-class dynamics and the geo-political contours of high finance.

== Select publications ==
=== Books ===
- “Anti-Crisis” Durham: Duke University Press, 2013.
- "Fiscal Disobedience: An Anthropology of Economic Regulation in Central Africa." NY: Princeton University Press, 2005.

=== Articles ===
- “Platform Economies: Beyond the North/South Divide.” Finance & Society 9, 1, 2023: 1–13. doi:10.2218/FINSOC.8089
- “The Ends of Perpetual Crisis” in H. Rydstrom, et al., ed. Special Issue, Critical Explorations of Crisis, Global Discourse: An Interdisciplinary Journal of Current Affairs. Vol. 12, Issue 3-4, 2022. DOI: https://doi.org/10.1332/204378921X16376650676641
- “Why Urgency, Now?” Afterword. Urgency and Imminence: The Politics of the Very Near Future. Special Issue of Social Anthropology/Anthropologie Sociale 30.4, 2022: 143–148. doi:10.3167/saas.2022.300410.
- “International Consultancy Firms and Africa: New Debt Bonds” in Hurl and Vogelpohl, eds. Public Policy, Private Expertise: Professional Service Firms in a Global Era. Polity Press, 2021. doi:10.1007/978-3-030-72128-2 7.
- “Africa Rising. Class or Finance?” Politique africaine, 40th Anniversary Issue, 161–162, 2021/1-2, pp. 205–226. ISSN: 22645047 02447827.
- “Africa, Otherwise” in B. Goldstone and J. Obarrio, eds. African Futures: Essays on Crisis, Emergence, and Possibility. University of Chicago Press, 2017. doi:10.7208/Chicago/9780226402413.003.0002.
- "The Right to Tax: Economic Citizenship in the Chad Basin," Citizenship Studies, 2007. doi:10.1080/13621020701262636
- "The Ethics of Illegality in the Chad Basin," in Comaroff and Comaroff, eds., Law and Disorder in the Postcolony. Chicago, IL.: University of Chicago Press, 2006. doi:10.7208/9780226114101-008
- "Modes of Governing: the Garrison-Entrepôt," in Collier and Ong, eds., Global Assemblages: Technology, Governmentality, Ethics. Malden, MA: Blackwell, 2004. doi:10.1002/9780470696569.ch22
- “Unsanctioned Wealth; or, The Productivity of Debt in Northern Cameroon.” Public Culture (2003) 15 (2): 211–237. doi:10.1215/08992363-15-2-211

=== Interviews ===
- Interview with Janet Roitman: “Anti-Crisis. Penser avec et contre les crises?" Special Issue "La fabrique et le gouvernement des crises", Critique Internationale 4, No. 85, Paris, Presses de Sciences-po, 2019, pp. 107–121.
  - Abbreviated version reprinted in English: “Anti-Crisis. Thinking with and against crisis” Journal of Cultural Economy, 13, 6. 2020, pp. 772–778. doi:10.1080/17530350.2020.1807388
- Interview with Janet Roitman by Michael Schapira. Full Stop: Reviews. Interviews. Marginalia. 2014.
