= Janet S Gaffney =

American–New Zealand academic

- Education: Arizona State University
- Scientific career
- Fields: Special education, literacy
- Workplaces: University of Mississippi, University of Illinois and University of Auckland
- Thesis: LD children's prose recall as a function of prior knowledge, instruction, and context relatedness (1984)
- Website: https://unidirectory.auckland.ac.nz/people/janet-gaffney

Janet S Gaffney is an American-New Zealand special education academic. She is currently a full professor at the University of Auckland.

== Academic career ==
After an undergraduate at Saint Louis University and the University of Missouri, Gaffney did a 1984 PhD at Arizona State University with a thesis titled LD children's prose recall as a function of prior knowledge, instruction, and context relatedness.

After working in the US at the University of Mississippi and the University of Illinois, she moved to the University of Auckland in 2012 as full professor, drawn in part by the legacy of Marie Clay, whose celebratory book, Stirring the Waters: The Influence of Marie Clay, Gaffney had co-edited.

== Selected works ==
- Gaffney, Janet S., and Richard C. Anderson. "Trends in reading research in the United States: Changing intellectual currents over three decades." Handbook of reading research 3 (2000): 53–74.
- Packard, Jerome L., Xi Chen, Wenling Li, Xinchun Wu, Janet S. Gaffney, Hong Li, and Richard C. Anderson. "Explicit instruction in orthographic structure and word morphology helps Chinese children learn to write characters." Reading and Writing 19, no. 5 (2006): 457–487.
- Jeong, Jongseong, Janet S. Gaffney, and Jin-Oh Choi. "Availability and use of informational texts in second-, third-, and fourth-grade classrooms." Research in the Teaching of English (2010): 435–456.
- Gaffney, Janet S., and Richard C. Anderson. "Two-tiered scaffolding: Congruent processes of teaching and learning." Center for the Study of Reading Technical Report; no. 523 (1991).
- Scruggs, Thomas E., Margo A. Mastropieri, Joel R. Levin, and Janet S. Gaffney. "Facilitating the acquisition of science facts in learning disabled students." American Educational Research Journal 22, no. 4 (1985): 575–586.
