= Janet E. Steele =

Professor of journalism at George Washington University

Janet E. Steele is a professor of journalism at George Washington University's school of journalism and an author. She published a book with a collection of newspaper articles from Indonesia. She also published a book about Tempo, an Indonesian magazine, during the Soeharto era in Indonesia and wrote a biography of Charles Anderson Dana. It has been described as covering "the complete history of the Sun.

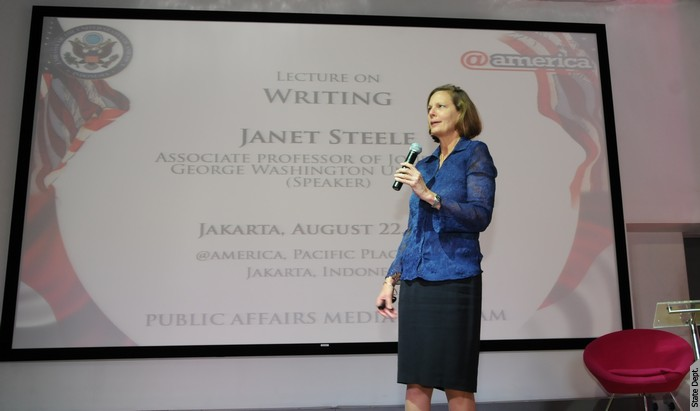

Steele found that experts appearing on television news programs are typically from a cadre of former political and military elites.

She was an assistant professor at the University of Virginia.

== Bibliography ==
- Mediating Islam, Cosmopolitan Journalisms in Muslim Southeast Asia (2018)
- Email Dari Amerika (Email from America) (2014)
- Wars Within: The Story of Tempo, an Independent Magazine in Soeharto’s Indonesia (2005)
- The Sun Shines for All: Journalism and Ideology in the Life of Charles A. Dana (1993), Syracuse University Press
