= Janet Dancey =

Canadian oncologist

Academic background
- Education: MD, 1988, University of Ottawa

Janet Dancey is a Canadian oncologist. In 2014, she was appointed director of the NCIC Clinical Trials Group and received a second term in 2020. In the same year, Dancey was also elected a Fellow of the Canadian Academy of Health Sciences.
