= Janet Mitchell =

Janet Mitchell may refer to:

- Janet L. Mitchell (born 1950), American physician
- Janet Mitchell (artist) (1912–1998), Canadian artist
- Janet Mitchell (cricketer), Barbadian former women's cricketer for the West Indies women's cricket team
- Janet Mitchell (EastEnders), a fictional character from the BBC soap opera EastEnders
- Margaret Mitchell (Scottish politician) (born 1952), full name Janet Margaret Mitchell
