= Janet Bathgate =

Scottish writer

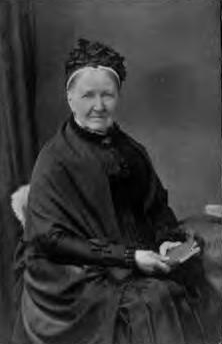
- Janet Bathgate in 1894
- Born: Janet Greenfield; June 4, 1806; Scottish Borders
- Died: 1898 (aged 91–92)
- Education: self-taught
- Occupations: Schoolteacher; writer
- Writing career
- Language: English
- Subject: Autobiography

Janet Bathgate née Greenfield (1806–1898) was a working-class Scottish writer who is remembered for her autobiographical Aunt Janet's Legacy to Her Nieces, Recollections of Humble Life in Yarrow in the Beginning of the Century. Despite very little schooling, she taught herself to read and write, becoming a schoolteacher herself.

== Biography ==
Born on June 4, 1806 in the Scottish Borders, Janet Bathgate was the daughter of the farm labourer John Greenfield and his wife Tibbie. She only attended school for very short periods but learnt to read and write at home, studying her father's letters. As a result of her parents' poverty, she was sent into service when she was only eight years old. She later became a nursemaid for the children of Robert and Susun Scott Moncrieff.

She left service when she married as a young adult but on her husband's premature death, in 1836 she opened a small school for infants in Dalkeith, offering reading lessons to local children. In 1838, she ran a school for children in Kirkhill. She later married Robert Bathgate who worked near Glasgow for a firm of cloth merchants. After he opened his own drapery and millinery business in Galashiels, Janet Bathgate helped him until he died in 1863. She then moved to Peebles where she held religious classes for the local women in the house she bought.

In later life she wrote Aunt Janet's Legacy to Her Nieces which she was persuaded to publish in 1894. The book was well received, attracting the interest of celebrities such as Lord Francis Napier and William Gladstone who found it "an edifying work, eminently well written, and full of interest." More recently, the book has been the subject of analyses of the behaviour of working-class women in the 19th century, including Melisa Klimaszeski's Writing the Victorian Home, A Nursemaid's Perspective on Maternity and Empire.

As she grew older, Bathgate suffered from failing eyesight. Thanks to the encouragement of her nephew James K. Rae, before she died she nevertheless dictated a tale he had remembered from his childhood. Titled Aunt Nell's Story, or a Feast at Habakkuk's Spring (an incident of the last century), it was published by the Edinburgh Religious Tract and Book Society.

Janet Bathgate died in 1898, aged 94.
