= Janet Shaw =

Janet Shaw may refer to:

- Janet Shaw (cyclist) (1966–2012), Australian visually-impaired tandem cyclist and author
- Janet Shaw (actress) (1919–2001), American actress
