= Janet Wallis =

- Born: 13 June 1858; Walthamstow, England
- Died: 14 February 1928 (aged 69); Croydon, England
- Known for: organising adoptions for babies in the UK and in Canada
- Spouse: Ransome Wallis

Janet Sophia Wallis born Janet Sophia McCall aka Mrs Ransome Wallis (13 June 1858 – 14 February 1928) was a British philanthropist and the founder of the Mission of Hope in Croydon. Children of unmarried mothers were offered for adoption both in Croydon and in Canada. The organisation operated the Hurst House Training Home in South Croydon to train girls and boys and the Haven for Homeless Little Ones.

== Life ==
Wallis was born in Walthamstow in 1858. She appears to have always been religious. As a girl she was called "Saint Janet" by other children. After she married Ransome Wallis she would occupy her time in organising and attending religious meetings.

After she lost her own baby and another of her children became ill, she was moved to help others. She wanted to create a mother and child home where babies could be cared for. The home was soon arranging adoptions. Usually charities would only take in the first child of unmarried mothers but Wallis realised that a second child still deserved care.

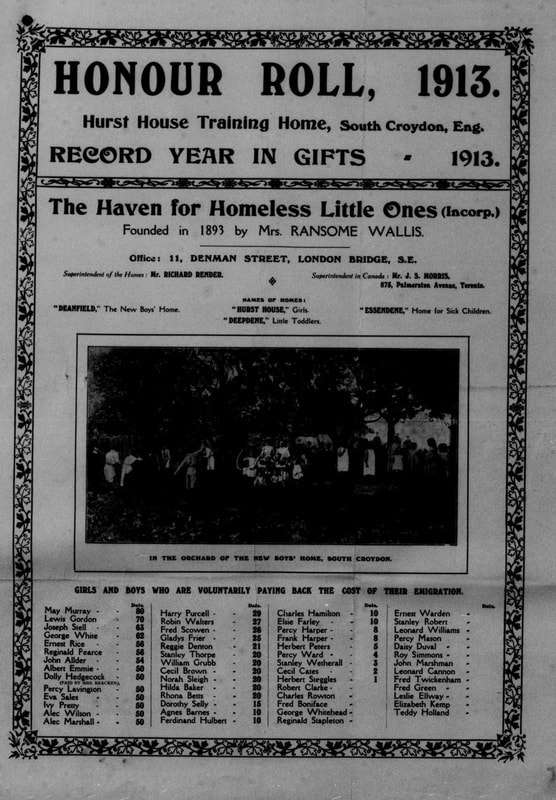
1913 honour-roll mentions Mrs (Janet) Ransome Wallis

Wallis created the "Mission of Hope" in Croydon in 1893 when it was called the "Haven of Hope for Homeless Little Ones". Adoption would not be regulated for another thirty years so babies could be offered for adoption with little legal oversight. The matron there would take in unmarried mothers and they had to keep to strict rules. Church attendance was expected. Wallis saw the home's role as caring for the child but also to "reform" the mother and the child. The matron was able to request to see any letters and her special permission was required before any male visitors were allowed. The mothers were expected to "help cheerfully" with caring for the babies and the necessary domestic work required to keep the home running and they were not allowed out of the home's grounds. The expectant mothers would stay at the home during the final weeks of their pregnancy and they would remain there until their child was adopted (after it had reached a weight of seven and a half pounds).

In 1907 her charity first sent children to Canada. The first group was sent in the care of the Reverend Robert Hall and he took the children to Toronto where they stayed until they were adopted. They later sent children to Ontario. This emigration of orphans continued until the first world war. In 1913 her organisation was publishing an "Honour Roll" of the children who were now in Canada and were paying back the cost of their own emigration.

During the first world war demand was high for her charity's services. Her own daughter had joined to help in 1913 and the pair of them had to manage the debts that were created. The charity was running in the 1920s when her husband would assist by leading scripture classes. He died in 1927 and Wallis died in Croydon in the following year.
