= Janet Campbell =

Janet Campbell may refer to:

- Janet Gladys Aitken (1908–1988), later Campbell, Canadian-British aristocrat and socialite
- Dame Janet Mary Campbell (1877–1954), British physician and medical writer
- Janet Campbell Hale (1946–2021), Native American writer
- Jessie Campbell (1827–1907), Jessie (Janet) Campbell, promoter of higher education for women in Scotland
- Janet Campbell (baseball), All-American Girls Professional Baseball League player
