= Janet Pilgrim =

Janet Pilgrim may refer to:

- Janet Pilgrim (model) (1934–2017), American model who appeared in Playboy magazine
- Janet Pilgrim (British Army officer) (born c. 1966), British military nurse, recipient of the Royal Red Cross
