= Janet Holder =

Canadian business executive

Janet Holder was a Canadian business executive who headed Enbridge Northern Gateway Pipelines.

With a chemical engineering degree from the University of New Brunswick and a master's degree in business from McMaster University, Holder joined Enbridge in 1992.

Holder was president of gas distribution at Enbridge from 2008 to 2011. In 2011, Holder became the executive vice president of western access at Enbridge, which she held until 2014 when she retired from the position.
