= Janet Cohen =

Janet Cohen may refer to:

- Janet Cohen, Baroness Cohen of Pimlico (born 1940), British lawyer, crime fiction writer, and life peer
- Janet Langhart Cohen (born 1940), American model, television journalist, and author
