= Janet Livingstone =

Scottish non-conformist and Presbyterian activist

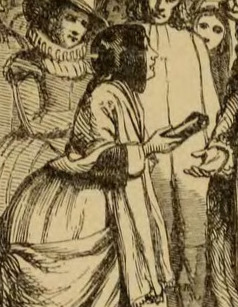
- Born: 28 September 1643; Scotland
- Died: 1 January 1696 (aged 52)

Janet Livingstone (28 September 1643–1 January 1696) was a Scottish non-conformist and Presbyterian activist against religious persecution in Scotland.

== Family ==
Livingstone was born in 1643 in Scotland. She was the daughter of John Livingstone, a Scottish Presbyterian minister and refugee in Rotterdam, and his wife Janet Fleming. She had three brothers: James, William and Robert. She married a Scottish merchant named Andrew Russell.

== Activism ==
By June 1674, she had become widowed. She was among a group of women, mostly the wives and widows of Presbyterian ministers, who petitioned the Scottish Privy Council in protest against the end of religious toleration. The women became active believing that the authorities would be more tolerant of female protesters and thus protect the men. They were successful in attracting a crowd in support of their cause. However, the crowd was perceived by the Councillors as threatening, so for her participation in the protest, Livingstone was briefly banished from Edinburgh.

== Death ==
She died on 1 January 1696.
