= Janet Stewart =

Janet Stewart may refer to:

- Janet Cumbrae Stewart (1883–1960), Australian painter
- Janet Stewart (broadcaster) (born 1967), Canadian television news anchor
- Janet Stewart, Lady Fleming (1502–1562), Scottish courtier
- Janet Stewart, Lady Ruthven (16th century), Scottish aristocrat
