= Janet Kozyra =

Heliophysicist

Janet U. Kozyra
- Education: University of Michigan
- Scientific career
- Thesis: Observational and theoretical investigation of stable auroral red arcs and their magnetospheric energy source. (volumes i and ii) (subauroral) (1986)

Janet Kozyra is a heliophysicist who works on solar superstorms. She has used data from Imager for Magnetopause to Aurora Global Exploration (IMAGE), to show that Earth interacts with solar energy during solar storms.

== Education and career ==
Kozyra earned a B.S. in Astronomy & Physics (1979), an M.S. in Aeronomy (1981), and a Ph.D. in Aeronomy & Space Physics (1986) from the University of Michigan. Following her Ph.D. she joined the faculty at the University of Michigan as an assistant research scientist. In 2005, Kozyra was named the George Carignan Collegiate Research Professor. In 2014, Kozyra retired from her position at the University of Michigan. As of 2020, Kozyra is at the National Aeronautic and Space Administration (NASA).

=== Selected publications ===
- Kozyra, Janet U.; Liemohn, Michael W. (2003). "Ring Current Energy Input and Decay". Magnetospheric Imaging — the Image Prime Mission. Vol. 109. Springer Netherlands. pp. 105–131. doi:10.1007/978-94-010-0027-7_6. hdl:2027.42/43761. ISBN 978-1-4020-1646-2.
- Kozyra, J. U.; Cravens, T. E.; Nagy, A. F.; Fontheim, E. G.; Ong, R. S. B. (1984). "Effects of energetic heavy ions on electromagnetic ion cyclotron wave generation in the plasmapause region". Journal of Geophysical Research. 89 (A4): 2217. Bibcode:1984JGR....89.2217K. doi:10.1029/JA089iA04p02217.
- Mannucci, A. J.; Tsurutani, B. T.; Iijima, B. A.; Komjathy, A.; Saito, A.; Gonzalez, W. D.; Guarnieri, F. L.; Kozyra, J. U.; Skoug, R. (June 2005). "Dayside global ionospheric response to the major interplanetary events of October 29-30, 2003 "Halloween Storms": IONOSPHERIC RESPONSE OCTOBER 29-30, 2003". Geophysical Research Letters. 32 (12): n/a. doi:10.1029/2004GL021467. hdl:2027.42/96340. S2CID 39423193.
- Tsurutani, Bruce; Mannucci, Anthony; Iijima, Byron; Abdu, Mangalathayil Ali; Sobral, Jose Humberto A.; Gonzalez, Walter; Guarnieri, Fernando; Tsuda, Toshitaka; Saito, Akinori; Yumoto, Kiyohumi; Fejer, Bela; Fuller-Rowell, Timothy J.; Kozyra, Janet; Foster, John C.; Coster, Anthea; Vasyliunas, Vytenis M. (2004). "Global dayside ionospheric uplift and enhancement associated with interplanetary electric fields". Journal of Geophysical Research: Space Physics. 109 (A8). Bibcode:2004JGRA..109.8302T. doi:10.1029/2003JA010342. hdl:2027.42/94746. ISSN 2156-2202.

== Awards and honors ==
- Fellow, American Geophysical Union (2005)
