= Janet Young =

Janet Young may refer to:

- Janet Badjan-Young (born 1937), Gambian playwright and administrator
- Janet Young, Baroness Young (1926–2002), British Conservative politician
- Janet Young (tennis) (born 1951), Australian professional tennis player
- Janet Young (actress) (ca 1889–1940), American actress
