= Janet Bewley =

Janet Bewley may refer to:

- Janet Bewley (politician) (born 1951), member of the Wisconsin Legislature
- Poppy Cooksey (born 1940), British fencer, previously Janet Bewley Cathie
