= Janet Lippincott =

American artist (1918–2007)

Janet Lippincott (16 May 1918 – May 2, 2007) was an American artist born in New York City, who lived in Santa Fe, New Mexico, from 1946 until her death. She was a part of an artistic movement called the New Mexico Modernists. Her work was abstract, and she worked in a variety of painting media and also made prints.

== Biography ==
Lippincott was the sister of W.J. Lippincott, who headed Lord & Taylor in New York, and of David McCord Lippincott who wrote the songs Daddy Was A Yale Man and Saving Ourselves For Yale. She spent part of her childhood in Paris, where she was exposed to modernist painters.

She attended the Art Students League of New York, and subsequently enrolled in the Women's Army Corps during World War II, working on Eisenhower's staff. In 1941–42, during the London Blitz, a building collapsed around her and she broke her back. In 1949, Lippincott attended the Emil Bisttram School for Transcendentalism in Taos, New Mexico. After studying with Bisttram and Alfred Morang, she took a job at the San Francisco Art Institute, and returned to New Mexico in 1954, establishing a house and studio in Santa Fe.

She was friends with the artist Elmer Schooley.

Upon her death in 2007, her estate, including documents, sketchbooks, and artworks, was donated to St. John's College in Santa Fe.

== Awards ==
Lippincott received the Governor's Award for Excellence in the Arts in New Mexico in 2002.

Lippincott was honored in an exhibition by the New Mexico Committee of the National Museum of Women in the Arts in 2003.
