= Janet Lynn Skinner =

American gospel musician (born 1955)

- Born: Janet Lynn Skinner; July 5, 1955 (age 71); Cleveland, Ohio
- Origin: Twinsburg, Ohio
- Genres: Gospel, traditional black gospel, urban contemporary gospel
- Occupations: Singer, songwriter
- Instruments: Vocals, singer-songwriter
- Years active: 1986–present
- Label: Word

Janet Lynn Skinner (born July 5, 1955) is an American gospel musician, and she is the present music minister of Destiny Church in Twinsburg, Ohio. Her first and only album, The Beginning, was released by Onyx Records in 1982. This was followed by a long-awaited sophomore project entitled One Prayer Away, which was released by Word Records in 1986. This was a Billboard magazine breakthrough release upon the Gospel Albums chart.

== Early life ==
Skinner was born in Cleveland, Ohio, on July 5, 1955, to an African-American father, Billie Haille, and a Euro-American mother, Dorothy Skinner, who was a private duty nurse. She never got to know her father because he contracted spinal meningitis, and succumbed to it shortly before she was born. She was reared in the church at Pleasant Grove Baptist Church, where the pastor was Jerry Valentine, and she became a member at the age of four years. While in high school, she was a participant in Future Nurses Club at the East Cleveland, Shaw High School. She went to study business at Cleveland State University, and while there she attended church at Cleveland Church of Christ, where she was active in the choir.

== Ministry ==
Skinner now is a minister in the music department of Destiny Church, Twinsburg, Ohio.

== Music career ==
Her music recording career was rather brief commencing in 1982, with her album, The Beginning, released by Onyx Records. Her second project entitled One Prayer Away, was released by Word Records. This placed on the Billboard magazine Gospel Albums chart at No. 25.

== Discography ==
List of studio albums, with selected chart positions
Title	Album details	Peak chart positions
Title	Album details	US Gospel
One Prayer Away: Released: 1986; Label: Word; CD, digital download		25
