= Janet Barlow (scientist) =

Scottish scientist

Janet Barlow is a Scottish scientist and professor of environmental physics at the University of Reading. She is an experimental physicist who has made significant contributions to our understanding of urban meteorology, with particular regards to weather forecasting, urban sustainability, indoor and outdoor air quality, building ventilation, and environmental wind engineering.

== Education and research career ==
Barlow completed a BSc in Applied Physics with German at UMIST in 1994, followed by an MSc in Applied Meteorology and Agriculture at the University of Reading in 1995. In 1999, Barlow completed a PhD on the turbulent transfer of space charge in the atmospheric boundary layer at the University of Reading. After a 3-year postdoctoral research associate post, she took up a lectureship at the University of Reading in 2002.

From 2011 to 2014, Barlow was director of the Centre for Technologies for Sustainable Built Environments (TSBE) at the University of Reading.

== Urban meteorology ==
Barlow's work is largely experimental in nature, using both wind-tunnel based physical modelling, and urban observational campaigns. Using a unique observatory at the top of the BT Tower in London, Barlow has researched the effect of weather and climate on urban pollutants and air quality. In addition to urban meteorology, she has studied boundary layer flow effects around wind farms and integration of renewable energy into the energy system.

Barlow has also research the effect of urban environments on the generation of wind energy.

== Recognition and community duties ==
2010-14 Member of Board of Urban Environment, American Meteorological Society

2003-7 Elected Member of Board of the International Association of Urban Climate.

2017- Member of UK Met Office Scientific Advisory Committee
