= Janet King =

Janet King may refer to:

- Janet King (Dad's Army), in the UK TV sitcom Dad's Army, played by Caroline Dowdeswell
- Janet King (character), in the Australian TV shows Crownies and Janet King, played by Marta Dusseldorp
- Janet King (TV series), a TV show spin-off from the show Crownies
