= Janet Siefert =

American biologist

Janet Louise Siefert received her PhD from the University of Houston (1997) and is an Associate Research Professor in the Department of Statistics at Rice University since January, 1998. She is an origin of life researcher who received her training from Dr. George E. Fox, co-discoverer of the third domain of life.

Siefert's work deals with understanding life's origins through microbial ecology and genomic and metabolic evolution. She has worked for 20 years in the Cuatro Ciénegas Basin, Mexico, a desert oasis protected by the Mexican government and known to exhibit endemism equal to the Galapagos.

She is the first woman to serve as chairman of the Gordon Research Conference on the Origin of Life and the first female president (2008–2011) of ISSOL: International Astrobiology Society. She is a member of University of Washington's Virtual Planet Laboratory and was recognized as an Astrobiology Pioneer. Her work has been featured on Discovery, National Geographic, and the History Channel. Additionally, she heads up an international team of investigators funded by the National Science Foundation looking at the legacy of human occupation in archaeological sites as reflected in the microbial community.
