= Janet O'Sullivan =

Irish pro-choice campaigner

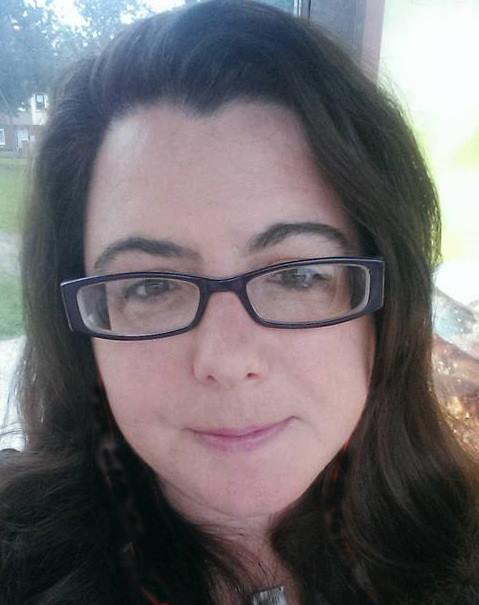
- Born: 1974 or 1975 (age 50–51)
- Other name: Janet Ní Shuilleabháin
- Known for: Pro-choice campaigning
- Website: janet.ie

Janet O'Sullivan is a pro-choice campaigner in Ireland. She is a former spokesperson for the Abortion Rights Campaign. She publishes under both the Irish version of her name, Janet Ní Shuilleabháin, and the English version Janet O'Sullivan. In 2016, the BBC included her in the list of 100 Women for "inspirational and influential women for 2016"

== Campaigning ==
O'Sullivan has been a pro-choice believer since the early 1990s, when the X Case made the news, and had an abortion herself a few years later. As the spokesperson for the Abortion Rights Campaign, she has frequently written in national newspapers, and appeared on radio and TV about the abortion debate in Ireland.

O'Sullivan is also a Bi-Visibility activist who has campaigned for Marriage Equality.

=== Referendum on the Eighth Amendment ===
O'Sullivan was in favour of the repeal of the Eighth Amendment and is working towards the goal of repealing the amendment and introducing legislation both in Ireland and Northern Ireland which ensures that women have the right to choose. On April 3, 2018, she registered as a third party with SIPO, the Irish government ethics watchdog. She was the only individual person to register as a third party.
