= Janet Edeme =

Nigerian agricultural scientist

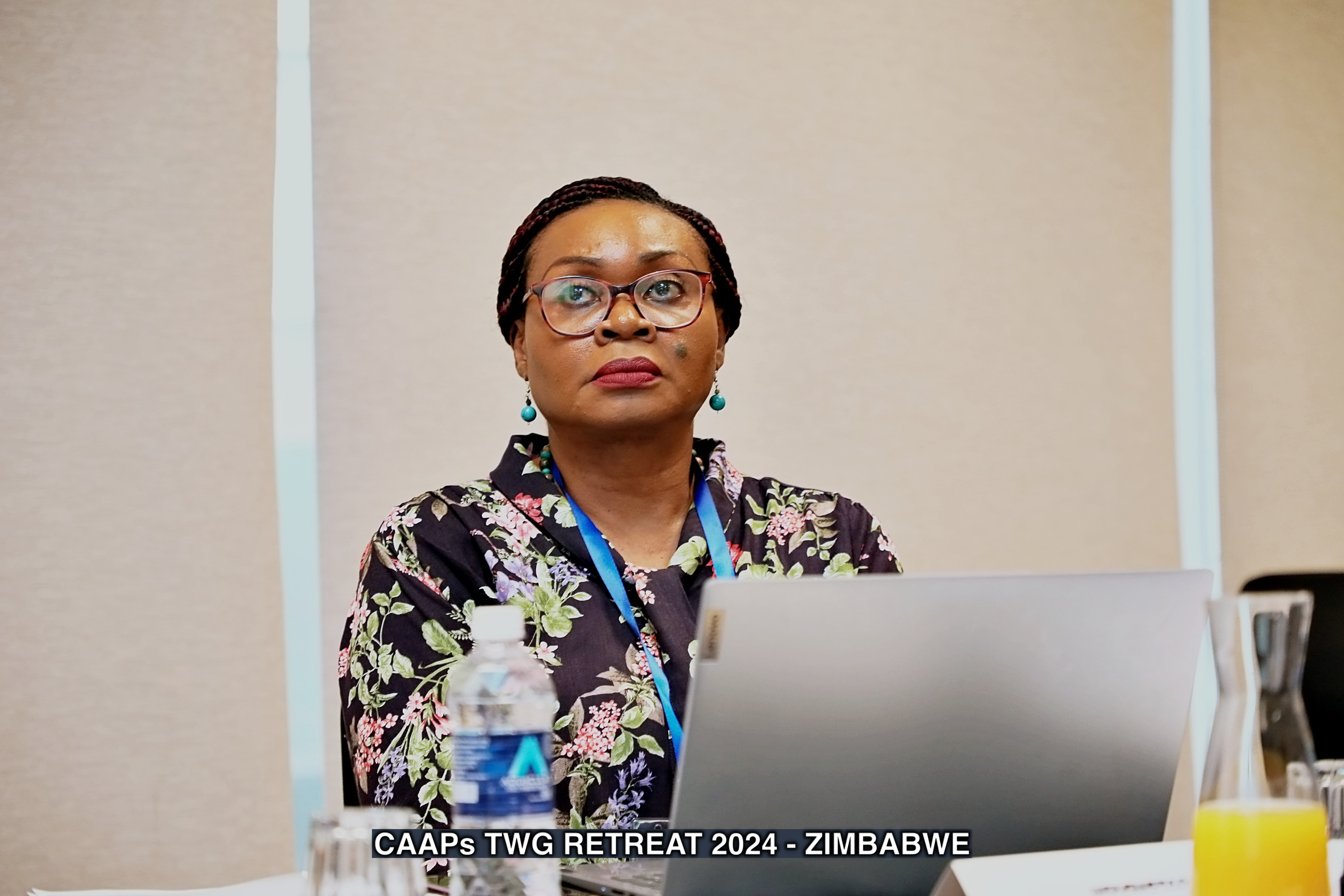
- Born: Nigeria
- Citizenship: Nigeria
- Education: University of Ibadan (Bachelor of Science) (Master of Science); Texas A&M University (Doctor of Philosophy)
- Occupations: Agricultural scientist and plant biologist
- Years active: 1980–present

Janet Edeme is a Nigerian agricultural scientist and plant biologist, who works as the director of the Department of Rural Economy and Agriculture at the African Union Commission (AUC/DREA), based in Addis Ababa, Ethiopia. AUC/DREA is a department within the African Union, responsible for promoting sustainable rural development through agriculture and the improvement of food security across the African continent.

== Background and education ==
Edeme is a Nigerian national who was born, raised and educated in her home country. She holds a Master of Science degree in Agricultural Biology, specializing in Plant Pathology, awarded by the University of Ibadan. Her Doctor of Philosophy degree was jointly awarded by Ibadan University, the Texas A&M University, in College Station, Texas, United States and the International Institute for Tropical Agriculture (IITA), in Ibadan.

== Work experience ==
Edeme's work and research focuses on the field of agricultural science. She carried out post-doctoral research at the International Livestock Research Institute (ILRI), in Nairobi, Kenya. She lectured at her alma mater, the University of Ibadan. She has also served as a consultant to international organisations, including the Joint United Nations Programme on HIV/AIDS (UNAIDS) and the Food and Agricultural Organisation of the United Nations (FAO).

== Other considerations ==
Edeme is a member of the Governing Board of AfricaSeeds, the inter-government agency, within the African Union, that is responsible for implementing the African Seed and Biotechnology Programme.
