= Janet Hale =

American consultant

Janet Hale is an American educational consultant / trainer and national staff development specialist in Curriculum Mapping, Standards Literacy, and Documenting Learning who provides consulting, coaching, and professional learning opportunities.

== Biography ==
She specializes in curriculum mapping; curriculum design using various models and frameworks; standards literacy and alignment; and documenting learning. Janet assists schools, districts, dioceses, higher-ed programs, and educational organizations and businesses with their curriculum, instruction, and assessment needs and improvement plans.

Hale attended Northern Arizona University in Flagstaff, Arizona, US, gaining a Bachelor's Degree in education, majoring in elementary education and special education. Her Masters of Arts degree, also from Northern Arizona University, in educational leadership and curriculum development; plus teaching in elementary, secondary, and special education classrooms, enable Janet to provide insights and information conducive to making decisions that improve curriculum, instruction, and assessment practices for all learners—including teachers and administrators.

Janet has written two professional curriculum mapping books: A Guide to Curriculum Mapping: Planning, Implementing, and Sustaining the Process, dedicated to understanding the complexities of curriculum mapping, and An Educational Leader's Guide to Curriculum Mapping: Creating and Sustaining Collaborative Cultures. Both books are published by Corwin Press.

Her third professional book, Upgrade Your Curriculum: Practical Ways to Transform Learning and Engage Students, is published by ASCD.

And her latest professional book, A Guide to Documenting Learning: Making Thinking Visible, Meaningful, Sharable, and Amplified, also published by Corwin Press, is focused on a contemporary approach to students' "owning their own learning" through documenting for learning (while learning), rather than of learning (after learning has been completed).

== Sources ==
- Janet Hale's Website Curriculum Decisions website
