= Janet Tai Landa =

Canadian economist, researcher and professor

- 戴融
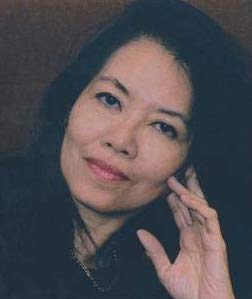
- Education: PhD of Economics, Polytechnic University of Virginia
- Occupations: Economist, Professor
- Father: 戴淮清 Tai Huai Ching

Janet Tai Landa is a Canadian economist, researcher and professor at York University, Toronto. She teaches the law and economics of public choice to undergraduate and graduate students. The aim of her research, for more than two decades, has been the law and economic analysis of legal institutions including culture – she investigated how the social order is achieved through social norms that are embodied in ethnic commerce networks and the exchange of gifts. She published numerous research papers on the trust, ethnicity and identity of Chinese merchants in Southeast Asia, which have been the central theme of her work on the "economy of identity." Landa's work had been praised as an important contribution to the new institutional economics literature by Journal of Institutional and Theoretical Economics. Landa is also the founder and chief editor of Bioeconomics Journal, an international research journal that integrates biology into economics, a journal she launched in 1999 at Kluwer Academic Publishers and now published by Springer.

== Economic philosophy ==
Economics often assumes an impersonal market, and the specific identity of buyers and sellers is not related to transactions, but is this really the case? Janet Tai Landa's researches aims to evolve around the core question: How does specific identity of buyers and sellers are related to transactions in economics.

As early as 1978, Janet Tai Landa published her thesis, The economics of the ethnically homogeneous middleman group: A property rights-public choice approach, at the Polytechnic University of Virginia, in which she had integrated the following factors: identity, trust, clan, religion, and symbols. Her papers were then published in the Journal of Legal Studies in 1981 and 1983, respectively. In both papers, she used the economic models to express her own thoughts. In general, Landa notes that real-life transactions are full of risks, and if two parties cannot negotiate to guarantee the performance of the contract, it would very inefficient. In her paper, she sees buyers and sellers as economic clubs — expanding the size of the club will bring more trading opportunities, but it will also increase the difficulty of supervision. However, the emergence of identity and clan can solve this problem. As Landa pointed out: on the one hand, the meaning of identity is that everyone can identify this person, understand his/her history, and assess his/her probability of default. In this sense, identity carries a reputation; on the other hand, individuals with the same identity form a group, and transactions take place within the group. She is particularly concerned about the Chinese business associations in Southeast Asia. The way they do business is exactly the opposite of economic assumptions – which is highly dependent on personal identity. This is not a unique phenomenon of the Chinese, according to her studies, the medieval Medici family, the Jews have history to differentiating buyers and sellers according to identities. For example, Jewish businessmen active in New York and Antwerp have monopolized the worldwide diamond business as their business activities are strictly limited to Jewish interior network. Even though Jews are scattered around the world, their faith in the Jewish tradition of rituals has never changed.

One of the cases that Janet chose was the Fujian Gang in Southeast Asia, which mainly engaged in rubber intermediary business. Fujian Gang is organized geographically, and the interior is quite united. They do business without relying on a formal system, but rely on the credibility of the group. Many large businesses are finalized on the phone, and the contract is signed afterwards. In fact, if the two sides agree this week, they will pay a batch of goods next Monday; even if the rubber price has fluctuated greatly on Monday, everyone will still follow the oral agreement. Despite the volatility of the rubber market, merchants are sometimes tempted to default, and they value more of their reputation.

Landa further extends these theories to religious issues. In the study published in 1983, she clarified two important aspects of religion: firstly, religion itself is also shared within a club. Many famous trade groups in history rely on religion to organize. Trading requires a high degree of trust, and the scale is too large to guarantee effective supervision; secondly, some religions often require behaviours that are difficult for others to understand such as dietary taboos, abstinence, etc., Landa believes that this is to raise the cost of enjoying club “discounts” and to filter people who only want to take advantage.

In the same article, Landa believes that symbols may play a similar role as identity. Group members reduce the cost of identifying each other through specific decorations, tags, flags, and the like. For people outside the group, these symbols may be completely meaningless; but people within the group can fully understand.

In her 1999 article, Janet Tai Landa draws on some of the key concepts of the new institutional economy, as well as the modern literature of evolutionary biology. She gives an explanation of the Chinese diaspora's dominance in market functions in the Southeast Asian economies. The success of Chinese merchants has provoked envy and hatred by local peoples, leading to episodes of racial violence against the Chinese. In order to understand the economic underpinnings of inter-ethnic conflict and violence, says Landa, it is necessary to understand the economic underpinnings of the success of Chinese merchants in Southeast Asia. Her article presents an economic theory of Chinese merchants, which suggests that the Confucian code of ethics emphasizes the importance of mutual help, reciprocal help between parents, colleagues and villagers speaking the same dialect. This allowed the formation of “club-like” organizational arrangements consisting of homogeneous members of merchants providing themselves with infrastructure essential or profit-making entrepreneurship. Thus the Chinese club-integrated merchants were able to benefit from lower transaction cost, which gave them a significant differential advantage in competing with other market-oriented ethnic groups. The EHMG (Ethically Homogeneous Middleman Group) club also functions as a unit of cultural transmission by leaving Confucian ethics to future generations of Chinese merchants, hence maintaining the Chinese merchant's vocation over time.

In short, it turns out that the theory that Janet Tai Landa abstracted from the business gang 40 years ago is surprisingly forward-looking — the analysis of trust, reputation and business groups is quite similar to Greif's series of classic studies; Analyzing the optimal size and entry threshold using religious, and it is also very consistent with Iannaccone's classic analysis of religion in 1992.

== Published books ==
=== Trust, Ethnicity, and Identity (1994) ===
Trust, Ethnicity, and Identity deals with the economic role of laws and institutions in achieving social order in a decentralized economy. This book mainly examines how ethnic kin-based trading networks can rely on trust when a well-developed framework of contract laws is missing. Specifically, this book considers the coordinating role of three major nonprice institutions—ethnic trading networks, contract law, and gift-exchange—in economizing on transaction costs and thus facilitating the process of exchange in decentralized economies in different historical contexts.

The major unifying theme of the book is this: identity matters when traders operate in an environment characterized by contract uncertainty, where the legal framework for the enforcement of contracts is not well developed. This in turn points out the importance of trust embedded in particularistic exchange relations such as kinship or ethnicity.

One unique facet of this book is that the author uses a property rights—public choice approach—part of the New Institutional Economics—to provide a unifying theoretical framework to explain such diverse exchange institutions as contract law, ethnic trading networks, and gift-exchange, In addition, it goes beyond the New Institutional Economics paradigm by incorporating some crucial concepts from sociology, anthropology, and bioeconomics, such as social structure, social norms, culture, reciprocity, and kin-related altruism. This broad interdisciplinary framework gives Landa's work a relevance beyond economics to law, political science, sociology, anthropology, and bioeconomics.

=== Economic Success of Chinese Merchants in Southeast Asia (2015) ===
This book analyzes the economic achievements of overseas Chinese businessmen in Southeast Asia: China's homogeneous group of Chinese homogeneous groups is an informal low-cost organization that provides contract merchandise and other club products, which is crucial for the success of businessmen. Landa's theory - and the various extensions that emphasize kinship and other trust relationships - draw on economics and other social sciences and go beyond evolutionary biology. Her empirical material forms the basis for the development of her unique, integrated and interdisciplinary theoretical framework and has important policy implications for understanding ethnic conflicts in multi-ethnic societies where minority groups dominate the role of merchants.

== Praise and awards ==
"Landa does an admirable job of relating her studies to disparate lines of social science research. She reviews ideas from mainstream economics, game theory, law and economics, public choice, Austrian economics, political science, sociology, anthropology, and sociobiology. The reader gets connected to a remarkably wide range of literatures. . . . Janet Landa has given us a book of rich insight into how the voluntary process remedies its own imperfections, especially in matters of trust in trade."

--Daniel B. Klein, Journal of Economic Literature

"Janet Landa is a pioneer in the application of transaction cost models to the study of ethnically-based economic networks. The present volume synthesizes a lifetime of work on Chinese middlemen. It combines the analytic methods of economics with theoretically-driven ethnographic research. It shows how division of labor within ethnic communities, social capital based on trust relationships, a deeply embedded code of ethics, the potential for monitoring and sanctioning dishonesty, and ways to internally generate mutual trust, the foundation of social capital, can explain the success of ethnic middleman entrepreneurs."

--Bernard Grofman

"The study of the Chinese merchants is of important and general significance for many reasons, as masterly demonstrated by this collected volume. Only recently did economists begin to appreciate the role of legal institutions in facilitating trade. Janet Landa has gone further to call our attention to the presence of social institutions, such as the ethnically homogeneous Chinese middleman group, mutual aid communities, social norms, trust, identity, and guanxi, to structure exchange relationships, without which trade and specialization would be severely impaired... In conducting her research on merchants, Landa also becomes a pioneer in engaging economic research with the rich scholarship in other social sciences and with evolutionary biology, and made them an integral part of her theoretical framework."

--Ronald Coase

== Family ==
Father: Tai Huai Ching was a news reporter at Singapore Sin Chew Daily, a photographer, and a Canadian Chinese transliteration.

Mother: Tang, Jinyun (1949–1955) Chinese teacher at Huaqiao Middle School in Singapore.

The eldest brother: Mian Tai, graduated from the Physics Department of Peking University in 1960. He translated and published "Da Vinci's Paintings", Beijing People's Fine Arts Publishing House, 1963. In 1973, he immigrated to Hong Kong and worked as a design engineer at the US-owned company in Central. Then, he immigrated to Canada in 1974. He was an engineer at the Canadian Atomic Energy Institute and the Canadian Aerospace Factory.

The second brother: Dr Willian Yuen Tai, Ph.D., Department of History at University of Hong Kong, and researcher at Institute of Southeast Asian Studies at University of the Netherlands. His major published works include “Chinese Capitalism in Colonial Malaya”, “The Origins of China's Awareness of New Zealand” in 2005, and"British Malayan Chinese Capitalist Economy” in 2018.

The third brother: Chao Tai, is a medical PhD at University of Alberta, and now work as a Brain Neurologist at Edmonton, Canada.

== Publications ==
Some of Tai Landa's publications include:

- 1976, "An exchange economy with legally binding contract: A public choice approach," Journal of Economic Issues, 10 (4), pp905–922
- 1978, "The economics of the ethnically-homogeneous chinese middleman group: A property right-public choice approach." Unpublished Ph.D. dissertation, Virginia Polytechnic Institute and State University
- 1981, "A Theory of the Ethnic Homogeneous Middleman Group: An Institutional Alternative to Contract Law," Journal of Legal Studies, Vol 10, No. 2, pp349–362
- 1983at. with J. Carr, The Economics of Symbols, Clan Names and Religion, Journal of Legal Studies, 13, pp135–156
- 1983b. The Enigma of the Kula Ring: International Relations of Law and Economics, 3, pp137–160
- 1983at. Trust, Ethnicity, and Identity: Beyond the New Institutional Economics of Ethnic Trading Networks, Contract Law, and Gift-Exchange, Ann Arbor, Mich., University of Michigan Press
- 1983New edition in 1998
- 1983b. with J. Carr, 'The Economics of Symbols, Clan Names and Religion', In: Janet T. Landa, Trust, Ethnicity and Identity: Beyond the New Institutional Economics of Ethnic Trading Networks, Michigan
- 1984, with Robert D. Cooter, Personal versus impersonal trade: The size of trading groups and contract law, International Review of Law and Economics, 4, pp15–22
- 1987, Hadley c. Baxendale and the Expansion of the Middleman Economy, Journal of Legal Studies, Vol 16, pp455–470
- 1988, "Underground economies: Generic or sui generis?" In: J. Jenkins, eds., "Beyond the Informal Sector: Including the excluded in developing countries," San Francisco: ICS Press, pp75–103, pp237–241
- 1991, "Culture and Entrepreneurship in Less-Developed Countries: Trading Networks and Economic Organizations," In: Brigitte Berger, ed., "The Culture of Entrepreneurship," San Francisco: ICS Press, pp53–72, pp217–222
- 1993, Cultura borrowed in the country menos desarrollados: the redes interétnicas comercios como organizaciones económicas, In: Brigitte Berger, dir., The cultura empresarial, México, Gernika
- 1999, The Law and Bioeconomics of Ethnic Cooperation and Conflict in Plural Societies of Southeast Asia: Theory of Chinese Merchant Success, Journal of Bioeconomics, Vol 1, No. 3, December, pp269–284
- 2001, with XY Wang, "Boundedly rationality of economic man: Decision-making under ecological, social, and institutional constraints", Journal of Bioeconomics, 3 (2/3), pp217–235
- 2002, In: FK Salter, dir., "Risky Transactions, Kinship, and Ethnicity," New York: Berghahn Books, pp129–142, "Cognitive Foundations of Trust and Informal Institutions: An Expanded Approach to Ethnic Trading Networks".
- 2005, "Bounded rationality of Homo classificus: The law and bioeconomics of social norms as classification", In: CA Hill, ed., "Symposium: Must we choose between rationality and irrationality?", Chicago-Kent Law Review, 80 (3 ), pp1167–1180
- 2006, "Austrian theory of entrepreneurship meets the social science and bioeconomics of the Ethnically homogeneous middleman group", In: Elisabeth Krecké, Carine Krecké and Roger G. Koppl, dir., Cognition and Economics, collection "Advances in Austrian Economics", Flight 9, London, Routledge, pp177–200
  - 1983New edition in 2007, Oxford: Elsevier, JAI Press, collection "Advances in Austrian Economics" (vol.9), pp177–200
- 2008, The bioeconomics of homogeneous middleman groups as adaptive Units of the Journal of Bioeconomics, 10 (1), pp259–278
