= Janet Douglas =

Janet Douglas may refer to:

- Janet Douglas, Lady Glamis (died 1537), Scottish noblewoman falsely accused of witchcraft and burnt to death
- Janet Douglas (seer) (fl. 1670s), Scottish woman who claimed to have the gift of second sight
- Janet Douglas (diplomat) (born 1960), British High Commissioner to Barbados and the East Caribbean since 2017
- Janet Douglas (historian) (1943–2024), historian of modern Leeds
