= Janet Morton =

Canadian visual artist (born 1963)

Janet Lynn Morton (born 1963) is a Canadian visual artist who is known for her knitted works.

== Early life and education ==
Morton was born in 1963 in Toronto, Ontario and raised in Burlington, Ontario. She is based in Guelph. She trained as a sculptor, earning a Bachelor of Fine Art Degree from York University in 1990. In 1980, Morton learned to knit in Denmark.

== Artistic practice ==
The artist began incorporating wool and yarn into her laborious textile-based work in 1992. Morton states; " Since 1992 I have used knitting and sewing symbolically and subversively in my work, as blatant low-tech metaphors. By employing these stereotypically domestic techniques and materials, I shift the axis from private to public, mundane to monumental, and attempt to address the confounding and complex ways that "value" is assigned to both objects and time investment." She also uses recycled materials and materials from nature, and additionally works in video, performance, and public sculpture. Occasionally, Morton works collaboratively.

An example of Morton's work is Cozy (1999-2000), which was affiliated with the Textile Museum of Canada (Toronto, Ontario). Morton constructed the work using over 800 reclaimed off-white sweaters, hand knit architectural details, custom made buttons and industrial velcro. It covered a small home on Ward's Island (Toronto, Ontario) for eighteen days in November 1999 and a metal scaffold structure at Trinity Square Park (Toronto, Ontario) for three days in April 2000.

In the thesis The Strength of a Knitted Home: Retrieving Histories through Janet Morton's Wool Installations, author Emily Jane Rothwell explores a socio-economic interpretation of Cozy; for example, she observes media bias in favor of the Ward Island installation, which was associated more with ideals of nature and the middle class, whereas the urban installation was linked more to the lower class, as homeless people lived (at the time and thereafter) in the park. In Morton's own words, "The concept [for Cozy] came from my thinking about the idea of home. Homelessness is inextricably connected to our feelings, thoughts and experience of home. I did not need to discuss "homelessness", it was implicit in the project. It was essential to me that Cozy was installed in both contexts. " Morton describes herself as a feminist, but states that her art is not intended to be "overtly political."

== Exhibition history, collections and awards ==
A retrospective of twenty years of her work, entitled The Ravelled Sleeve, was held in 2012 at the McDonald Stewart Art Centre at the University of Guelph (Guelph, Ontario).

Morton's work is in the collections of Cambridge Galleries, Museum London, and the National Gallery of Canada, as well as corporate and private collections.

Morton has received funding from the Toronto Arts Council, Ontario Arts Council, and the Canada Council for the Arts. In 2001, she was the recipient of the Paris Studio Award (France) from the latter funding agency.
