= Janet Williams =

Janet Williams may refer to:

- Janet Williams (soprano), American soprano opera singer
- Janet Williams (basketball) (born 1953), Australian basketball player
- Janet B. W. Williams (born 1947), American social work scholar
- Janet Williams, a character in the 1991 film JFK, based on Ruth Paine but renamed to avoid legal action
