= Janet Graham (poet) =

Scottish poet

For the English composer, music educator, and music therapist, see Janet Graham.

Janet Graham (1723–1805) was a Scottish poet, and a feature of 18th century Edinburgh society.

== Biography ==
Graham was born at Shaw, near Lockerbie, Dumfriesshire, in 1723. She lived in Dumfries and later Edinburgh, where she became a favoured member of Edinburgh society.

Graham is remembered for her only surviving published poem, The Wayward Wife, which was once popular and was reprinted a number of times in anthologies. The poem is a warning to a son about the demerits of matrimony. She died in Edinburgh in April 1805, aged 82.

== Notes ==
This article incorporates text from a publication now in the public domain: Goodwin, Gordon (1890). "Graham, Janet". In Stephen, Leslie; Lee, Sidney (eds.). Dictionary of National Biography. Vol. 22. London: Smith, Elder & Co.
