= Janet Donald =

New Zealand church leader

Janet Donald (c.1825–27 March 1892) was a New Zealand church leader. She was born in Wigtownshire, Scotland on c.1825.
