= Janet Richards =

Janet Richards may refer to:

- Janet C. Richards, American literacy scholar
- Janet Elizabeth Richards (1859-1948), American writer and lecturer
- Janet Radcliffe Richards (born 1944), British philosopher
- Janet Richards (Egyptologist) (born 1959), American Egyptologist and academic

== See also ==
- Janet Richard (born 1998), Maltese athlete
