= Janet Morison Miller =

- Born: November 12, 1891; St. John's, Newfoundland and Labrador
- Died: April 5, 1946 (aged 54); St. John's, Newfoundland and Labrador
- Education: Bishop Spencer College
- Occupation: Lawyer
- Known for: First woman entered onto Newfoundland Law Society rolls

Janet Morison Miller (November 12, 1891 – April 5, 1946) was the first woman entered on the rolls on the Newfoundland Law Society, in the Dominion of Newfoundland, United Kingdom.

== Early life ==
The youngest daughter of Lewis Miller and Mary Morison, Miller was born in St. John's, Newfoundland on November 12, 1891. She attended Bishop Spencer College, St. John's, where she won the Lord Bishop's Scripture prize and was runner up for the Jubilee Scholarship. Miller studied law in the office of her uncle, Donald Morison, who was Newfoundland's attorney general. In 1910, she petitioned the Law Society to be examined, but the Law Society refused on the grounds that membership was restricted to men.

== Law society ==
At the next annual general meeting of the society, Morison put forward a motion requesting that women be allowed to join the society. His request was refused. However, as an influential member of government, he convinced cabinet to amend the Law Society Act in 1911 to give women the legal right to become members of the legal profession in Newfoundland. In 1913 Miller became a law student in her uncle's firm.

== In Scotland ==
In 1915, after the start of World War I, Janet and her mother moved to Scotland, where Janet's fiancé, Eric Ayre, was stationed with the Newfoundland Regiment. Janet and Eric were married in Edinburgh on June 19, 1915. A little more than a year later, Eric was killed at Beaumont-Hamel.

== In England ==
After Eric's death, Janet, together with her mother and her mother-in-law, Janet moved to the south of England. She served with the Voluntary Aid Detachment (VAD) of the British Red Cross in the 1st Berkshire Association and also trained as an ambulance driver.

== In Newfoundland ==
After the war, she returned to Newfoundland, but did not return to study law. Instead, she joined her sister, Agnes Miller Ayre, to become a leading player in the suffragette movement in the early 1920s, helping to win Newfoundland women the right to vote. She helped found the Child Welfare League the Art Society and NONIA. On April 30, 1924, she married Andrew H. Murray, a St. John's businessman, and they had one daughter. Janet died at St. John's on April 5, 1946, after a short illness.

== Posthumous recognition ==
On October 14, 2016, Janet became an honorary lawyer, along with four members of the Newfoundland Regiment who died in World War I. Law certificates bearing their names were displayed to the court alongside five of their modern-day counterparts.
