= Janet L. Beizer =

American academic

- Education: Cornell University (B.A.); Yale University (PhD)
- Occupation: Academic
- Employer: Harvard University

Janet L. Beizer is an American academic. She is a professor of Romance Languages and Literatures at Harvard University. Beizer is a scholar of French literature with a focus on the 19th and early 20th centuries. She completed her undergraduate degree at Cornell University and received her Ph.D. from Yale University.

Beizer has authored several books including Ventriloquized Bodies andThinking through the Mothers. She was awarded a Guggenheim Fellowship for her scholarly contributions to European and Latin American Literature in 2016. In that same year she was named a Marta Sutton Weeks Fellow by the Stanford Humanities Center.
