= Janet Aitken =

Janet Aitken may refer to:

- Janet Aitken (physician) (1886–1982), British physician
- Janet Aitken (artist) (1873–1941), Scottish painter
- Janet Gladys Aitken (1908–1988), Canadian-British aristocrat and socialite
