= Janet Leathem =

New Zealand psychology academic

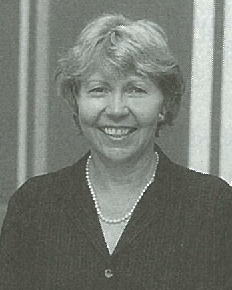
- Leathem in 2001
- Born: New Zealand
- Education: Victoria University of Wellington
- Scientific career
- Fields: Traumatic brain injury
- Workplaces: Massey University
- Thesis: Some Aspects of Cortical Functioning in Man (1980)
- Website: www.massey.ac.nz/massey/expertise/profile.cfm?stref=635030

Janet Marion Leathem is a New Zealand psychology academic specializing in traumatic brain injury. She is currently a full professor at Massey University.

== Academic career ==
After a 1975 MSc thesis titled 'The assessment of laterality' and a 1980 PhD titled 'Some Aspects of Cortical Functioning in Man,' both at Victoria University of Wellington, Leathem moved to Massey University, where she rose to full professor.

Leathem has spoken out about memory loss, in relation to the John Banks and Kim Dotcom scandal, and the way concussion is handled in rugby union.

== Selected works ==
- Leathem, Janet M.; Murphy, Latesha J.; Flett, Ross A. (1998). "Self-and informant-ratings on the patient competency rating scale in patients with traumatic brain injury". Journal of Clinical and Experimental Neuropsychology. 20 (5): 694–705. doi:10.1076/jcen.20.5.694.1122. PMID 10079045.
- Barnfield, Tracey V.; Leathem, Janet M. (1998). "Incidence and outcomes of traumatic brain injury and substance abuse in a New Zealand prison population". Brain Injury. 12 (6): 455–466. doi:10.1080/026990598122421. PMID 9638323.
- Gemmell, Chriztine; Leathem, Janet M. (2006). "A study investigating the effects of Tai Chi Chuan: individuals with traumatic brain injury compared to controls". Brain Injury. 20 (2): 151–156. doi:10.1080/02699050500442998. PMID 16421063.
- Christianson, Muriel K.; Leathem, Janet M. (2004). "Development and standardisation of the computerised finger tapping test: comparison with other finger tapping instruments". New Zealand Journal of Psychology. 33 (2).
- Barnfield, Tracey V.; Leathem, Janet M. (1998). "Neuropsychological outcomes of traumatic brain injury and substance abuse in a New Zealand prison population". Brain Injury. 12 (11): 951–962. doi:10.1080/026990598122007. ISSN 0269-9052. PMID 9839028.
