= Janet Martin Welch =

Janet Martin Welch (January 12, 1945 - January 3, 2023) was the New York State Librarian from 1996 to 2008. She was the first woman to hold the position. She was the daughter of library science pioneer Lowell Arthur Martin.

Following the events of September 11, 2001, Mrs. Welch oversaw efforts to collect and preserve artifacts from the World Trade Center at the New York State Museum.

== Awards ==
- NYLA President's Award for Development and Leadership of Nationwide Public Awareness of Libraries Campaign (1995)
- American Library Association Anniversary Award for Nationwide Library Legislative Success and Improvement of Library Services for the American People (1996)
- Improvement of Library Services for the American People Award (1996)

== Legacy ==
As State Librarian, Welch helped expand public access to technology in libraries across New York. During her tenure, the New York State Library received a $7.7 million grant from the Bill & Melinda Gates Foundation to provide computers, internet access, and training for public libraries serving low-income communities. The New York State Library also credits her administration with increasing public access to computers statewide.
