= Janet Thompson =

Janet or Jan Thompson may refer to:

- Janet Thompson (figure skater) (born 1956), English ice dancer
- Janet Thompson (athlete) (born 1954), English discus athlete
- Janet Thompson (basketball) (1933–2014), American basketball player
- Jan Thompson (diplomat) (born 1965), British diplomat
- Janet Thompson, a character in the film serial The Adventures of Smilin' Jack, played by Marjorie Lord
