= Janet McCallum =

Janet McCallum may refer to:

- Janet McCallum (suffragette) (1881–1946), Scottish trade unionist and working-class suffragette
- Janet McCallum (writer) (1947–2015), New Zealand non-fiction writer and journalist
