= Janet Clark =

Janet Clark may refer to:

- Janet H. Clark (born 1941), American former politician
- Janet Howell Clark (1889–1969), American physiologist and biophysicist
- Jan Clark, British environmentalist and politician

== See also ==
- Janet Clarke (1851–1909), Australian socialite and philanthropist
