= Janet Chapman =

American novelist

Janet Chapman was born in northern Maine and was a New York Times bestselling author. She died after a long battle of cancer on October 28, 2017.

== Bibliography ==
=== Highlander Series ===
1. Charming The Highlander (2003)
2. Loving The Highlander (2003)
3. Wedding The Highlander (2003)
4. Tempting the Highlander (2004)
5. Only With a Highlander (2005)
6. Secrets of the Highlander (2008)
7. A Highlander Christmas (2009)
8. Highlander for the Holidays (2011)

=== Puffin Harbor Series ===
1. Seductive Impostor (2004)
2. The Dangerous Protector (2005)

=== Logger Series ===
1. The Seduction of His Wife (2006)
2. The Stranger in Her Bed (2007)

=== The Sinclair Brothers Series ===
1. The Man Must Marry (2008)
2. Tempt me if you can (2010)
3. It's a Wonderful Wife (2015)

=== Midnight Bay Trilogy ===
1. Moonlight Warrior (2009)
2. Dragon Warrior (2010)
3. Mystical Warrior (2011)

=== Spellbound Falls Series ===
1. Spellbound Falls (2012)
2. Charmed By His Love (2012)
3. Courting Carolina (2012)
4. The Heart of a Hero (3/5/2013)
5. For the Love of Magic (8/27/2013)
6. The Highlander Next Door (2014)
7. From Kiss to Queen (2016)
8. Call it Magic (2020) published posthumously
