= Janet Bannister =

Business executive and venture capitalist

- Education: Ivey Business School
- Alma mater: University of Western Ontario
- Occupations: Business executive, venture capitalist

Janet Bannister is a Canadian business executive and venture capitalist. She is the founder and managing partner of Staircase Ventures. Prior to launching Staircase in 2023, she was the managing partner at Real Ventures, an early-stage venture capital firm.

== Early life and education ==
Bannister was a varsity long-distance runner and a national triathlon champion in Canada finishing 8th in the world at the Long Distance Triathlon World Championships in 1996. She holds a degree from the Ivey Business School at the University of Western Ontario.

== Career ==
Bannister started her career as a brand manager at Procter & Gamble and then as an engagement manager with McKinsey & Co. In 2001, she spent four years at eBay in Silicon Valley. In 2004, she launched Kijiji.ca which became one of Canada's most-visited websites.

Bannister is the co-chair of C100 and on the boards of the Ivey Business School and LEAP, a social venture accelerator, as well as serving as a mentor at Creative Destruction Lab at the University of Toronto.

She also founded and was CEO at a venture-backed start-up prior to joining Real Ventures in 2014. In 2017, she was announced as part of a team to guide fintech strategy for the province of Ontario and the Canadian Economic Strategy Roundtable on Digital Industries.

In 2025, she was awarded an honorary Doctor of Laws degree by Ontario Tech University.

== Staircase Ventures ==
Launched by Bannister in 2023, Staircase Ventures closed their first fund by collecting C$34 million with investors including the Royal Bank of Canada.

In October 2023, it led the Calgary fintech startup Fillip to a C$5m seed round of fundraising. By February 2024, the firm had also led seed rounds of funding for other Canadian startups including AI drug discovery platform Biossil and Rhenti, a marketing automation platform, along with a C$6m round for AI-focused Sibli. In April of that year, it was involved in a C$2.7m seed extension to Galatea, a waste logistics software company, while in December it helped lead a $5 million minority equity financing round for Eventric, a US-based software company focused on live events.

In March 2026, Bannister and Staircase Ventures completed a second round of fundraising with a C$50 million fund for a total of C$84 million raised.
