= Janet Toro =

Chilean artist

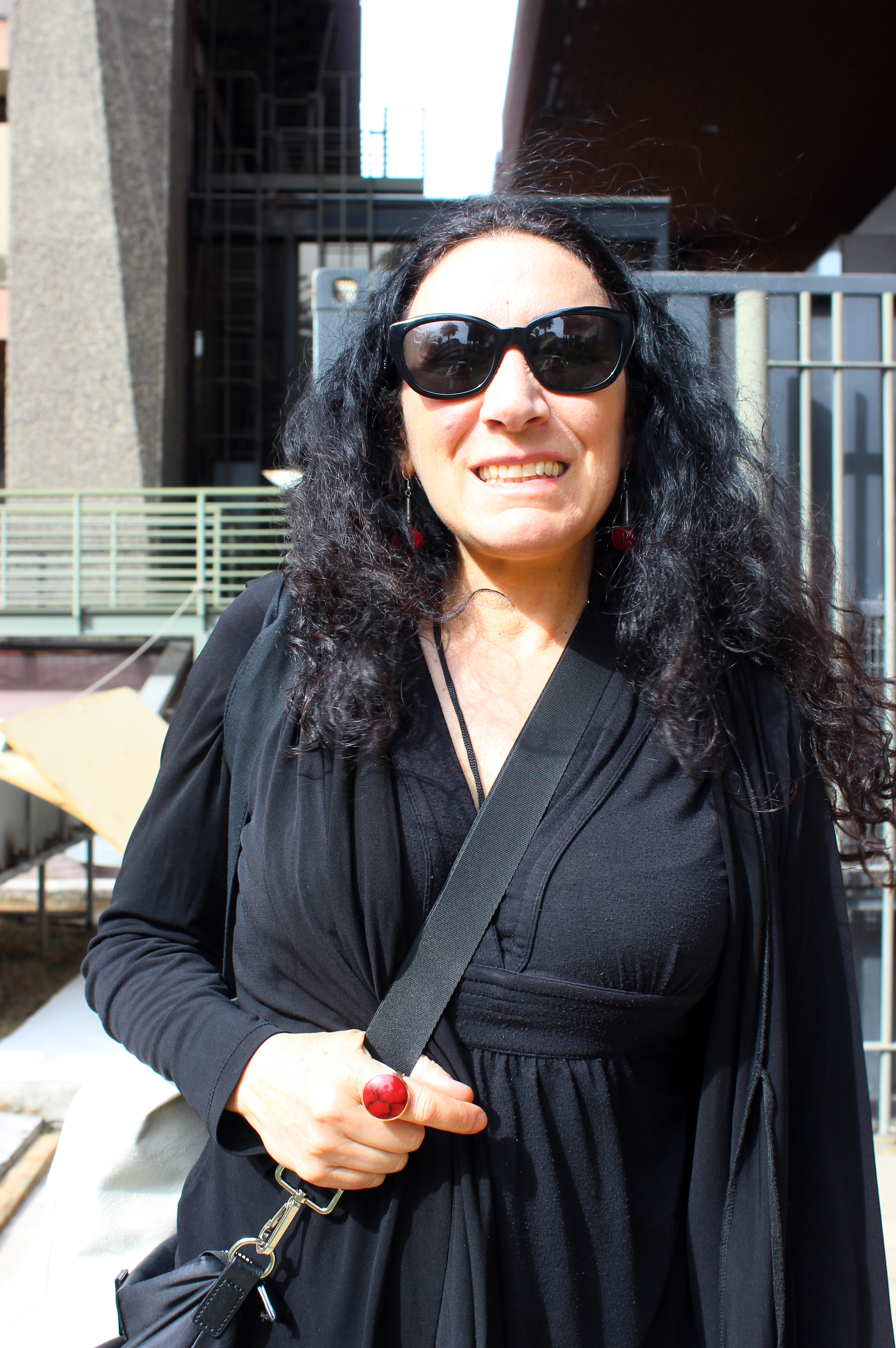
- Janet Toro, 2018
- Born: August 24, 1963 (age 63); Osorno, Chile
- Education: Studied fine art at the Universidad de Chile
- Occupation: Performance artist
- Years active: 1986–present
- Known for: Addressing social injustices in Chile, anti-dictatorial work
- Notable work: El cuerpo de la memoria (The body of memory), In Situ

Janet Toro (born in Osorno, Chile, August 24, 1963) is a performance artist based in Chile and Germany whose work has centered around an anti-establishment message and the illumination of the social injustices that resulted from the Pinochet dictatorship. She is most well known for her work, El cuerpo de la memoria (The body of memory), where she performed 90 actions over 44 days at the Museo Nacional de Bellas Artes in Santiago, Chile. Shortly after this, she moved to Germany in 1999, where she continued her career as a performance artist before moving back to Chile in 2014.

== Biography ==
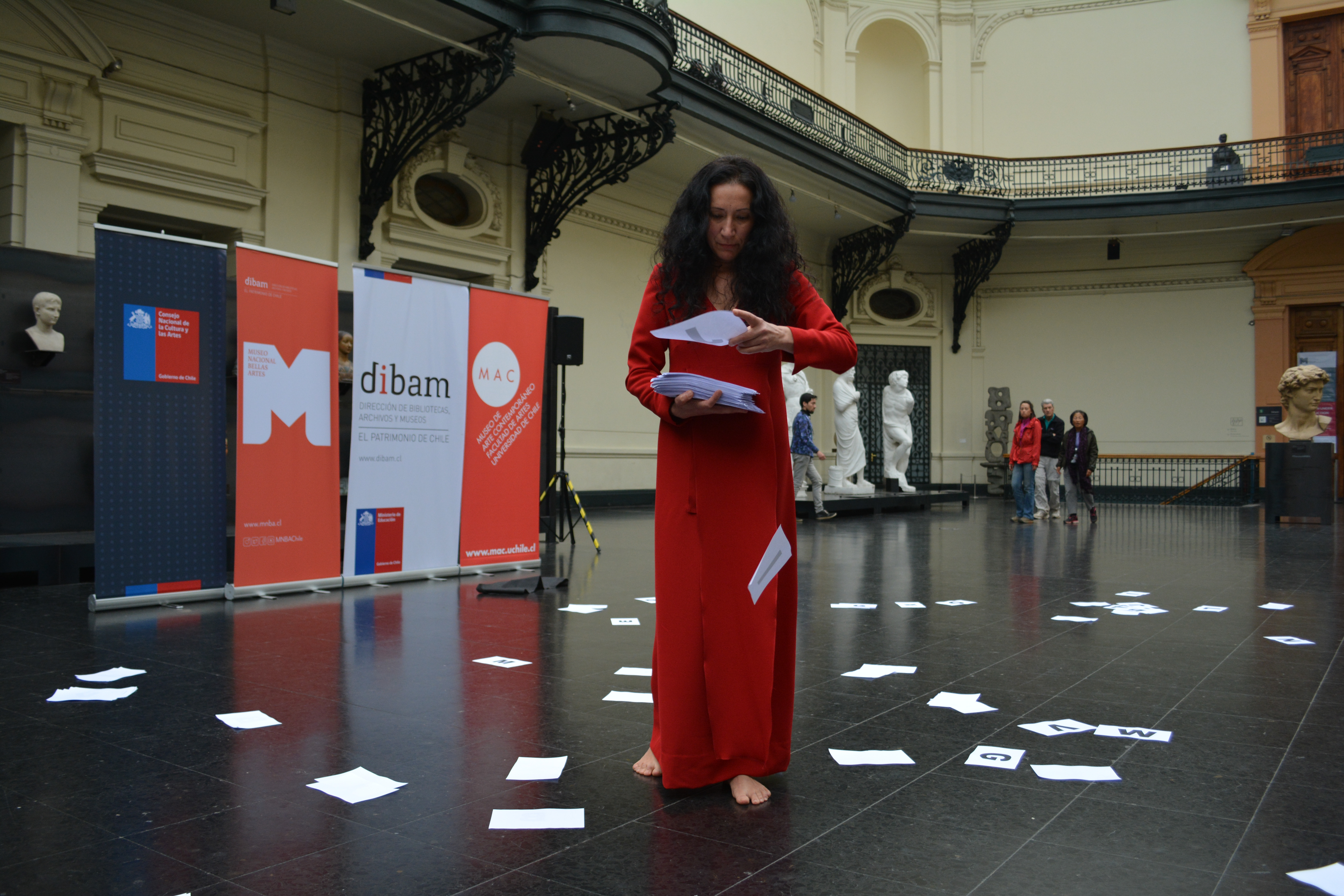
Editatón de Mujeres Artistas by Janet Toro

Janet Toro studied fine art at the Universidad de Chile in Santiago and was affiliated with the artist activist group, Agrupación de Plásticos Jóvenes. During the time Chile was under the military dictatorship, Toro stopped painting to pursue activist and performance art. The Chilean group, Colectivo de Acciones de Art (CADA) served as inspiration as Toro created more anti-dictatorial work. Shortly after her return to Chile in 2014, she produced the work In Situ at the Museo de la Memoria y los Derechos Humanos in Santiago. This work addressed the loss of the Mapuche culture in contemporary Chile.

== Selected solo exhibition and performances ==
1986 – Dos preguntas (performance with Claudia Winther), Paseo Ahumada, Santiago

1998 – La locura (performance), Centro Experimental Perrera-Arte, Santiago

2001 – Perros peleando, Galeria Gerda Türke, Dortmund, Germany

2004 – Exposición Mácula, Bonifatius Kirche, Dortmund, Germany

2011 – Entre líneas, Galeria Kunstkontor, Cologne, Germany

2012 - Anomie, serie Dibujar el límite, Galería 0, Colonia, Alemania

2013 - Carmín, serie Dibujar el límite, Galería 0, Colonia, Alemania

2014 - Exhumar la memoria, Museo de la Memoria y los Derechos Humanos, Santiago, Chile

2015 - El Reflejo, serie In Situ, curador Dr. Ricardo Loebell, Museo de la Memoria y los Derechos Humanos, Santiago, Chile

2017 - Este es mi cuerpo, fachada del Museo de Arte Contemporáneo MAC, Santiago, Chile

2018 - La Torre Vive, de la serie Intersubjetividad Urbana, Torre GAM, Santiago, Chile

2023 - El cuerpo de la memoria, Museo de Arte Contemporáneo (MAC), Santiago Chile

2025 - Janet Toro. Intimidad radical. Desbordamientos y gestos, Museo Nacional de Bellas Artes (MNBA), Santiago, Chile

== Gallery ==
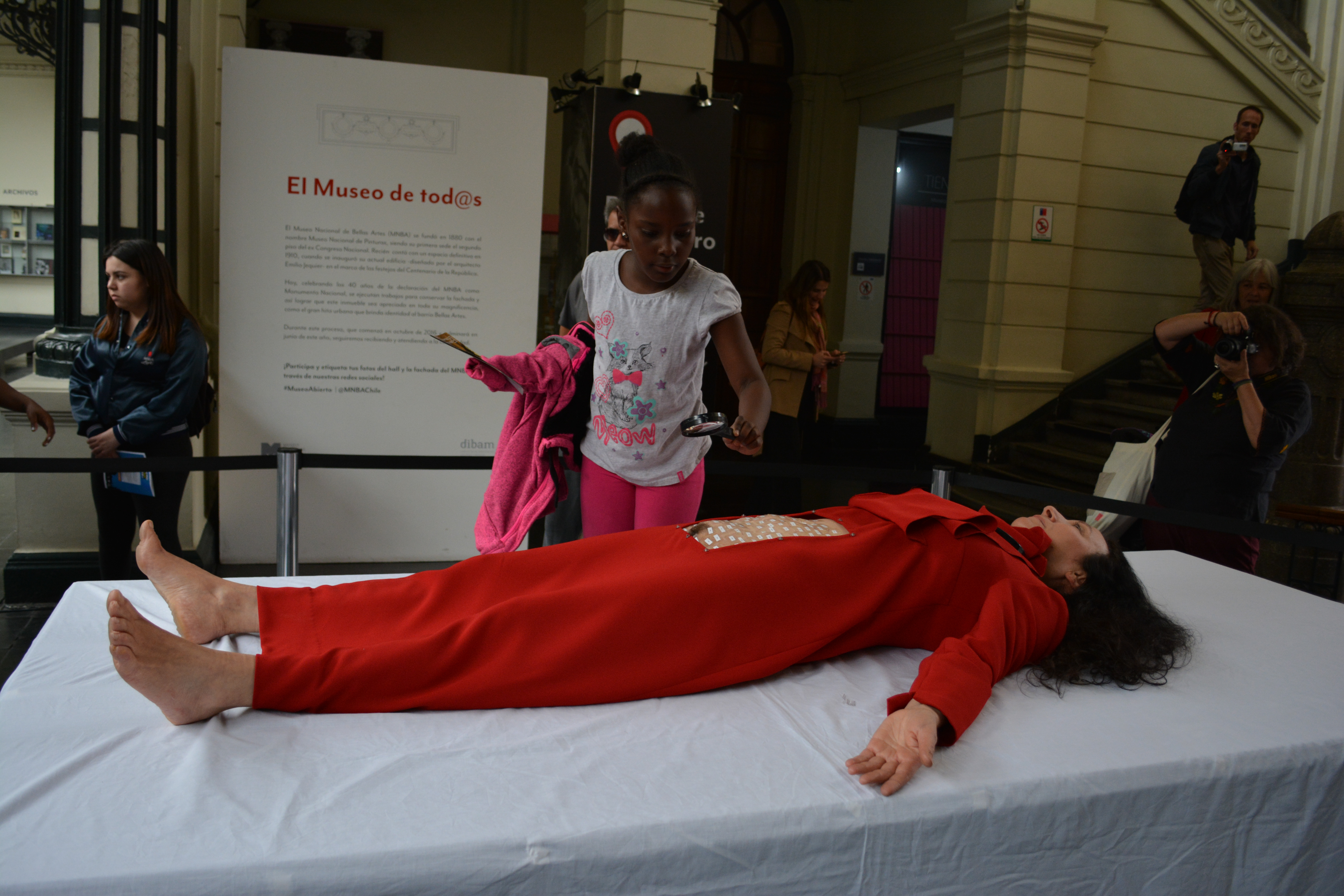

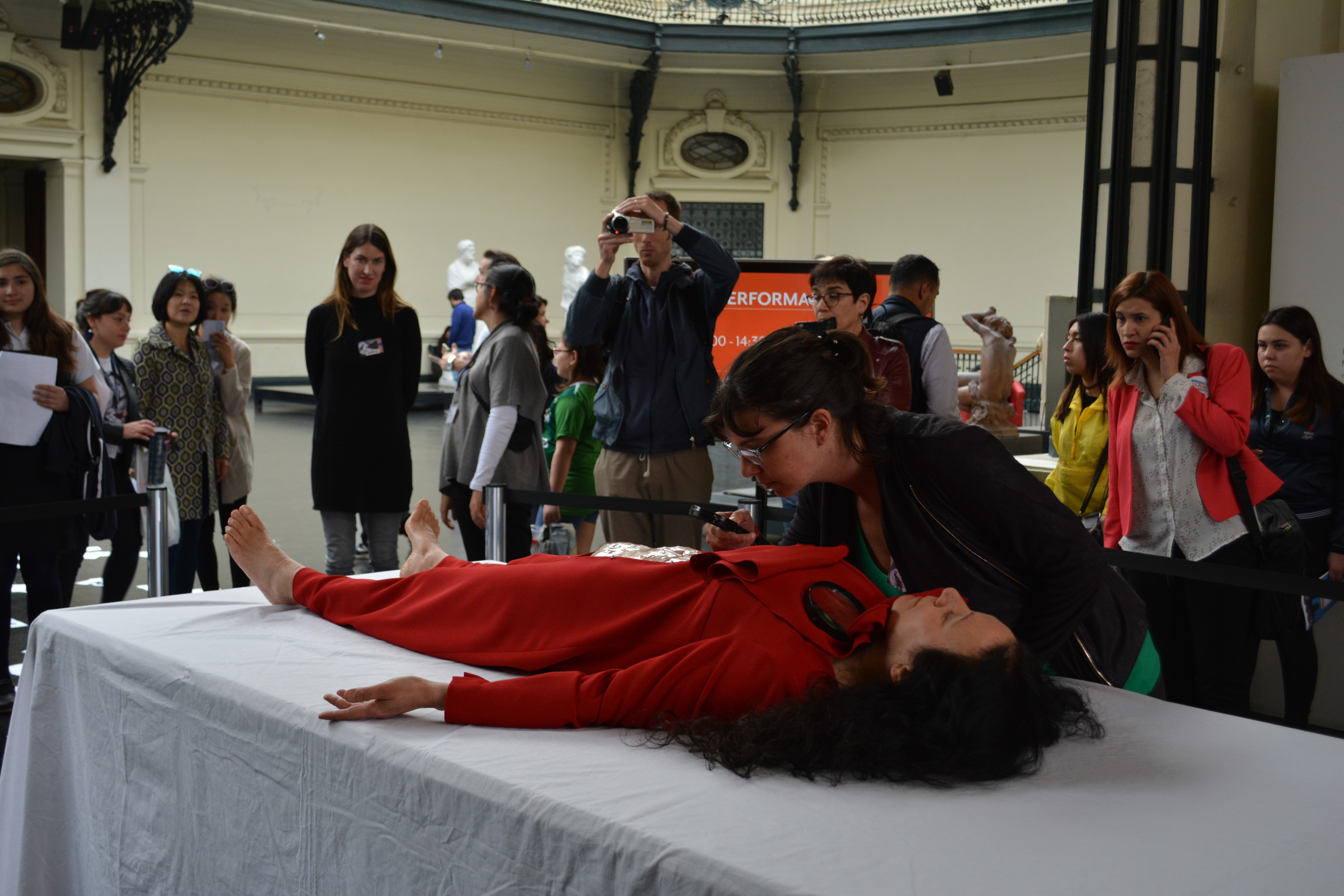

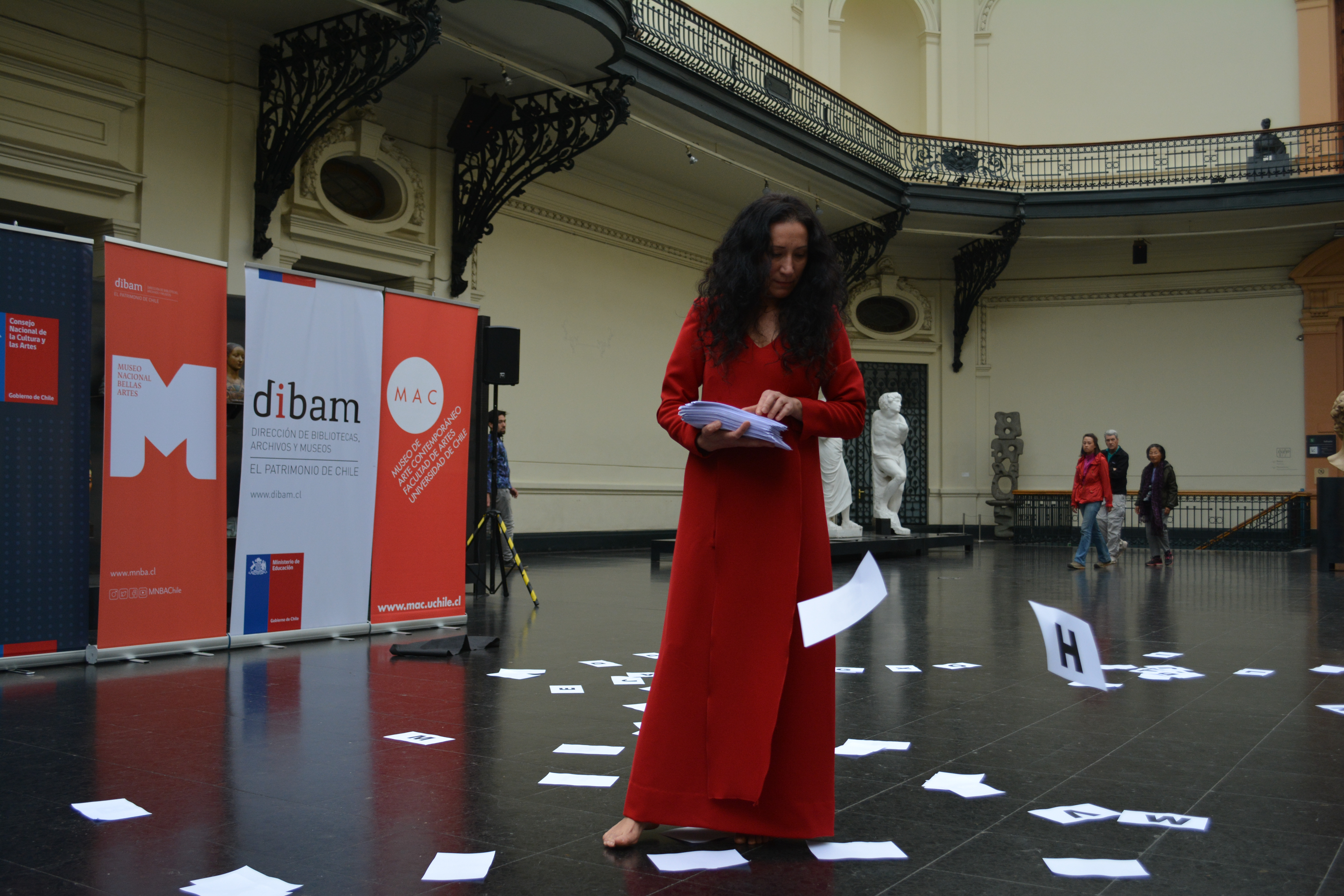

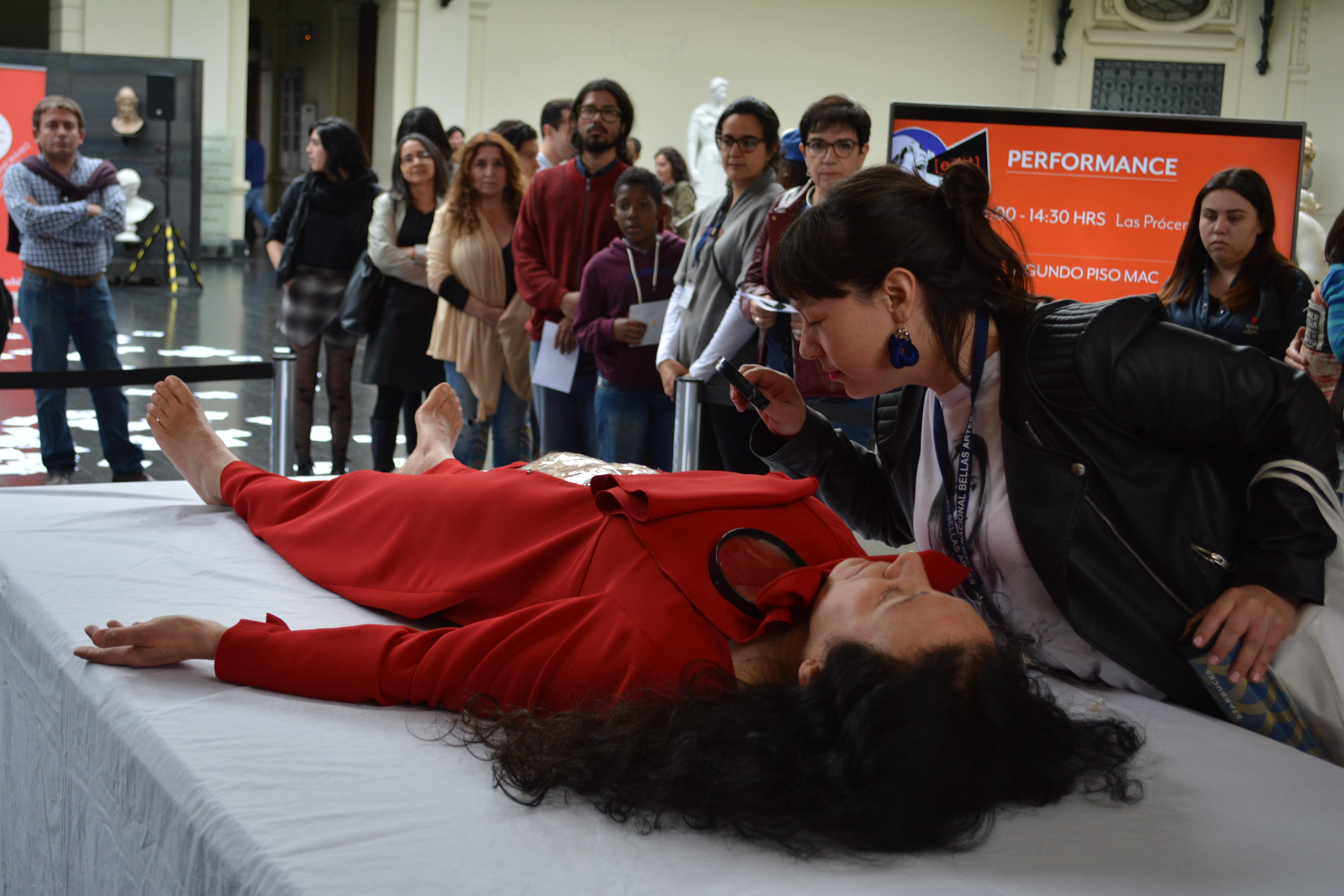
