= Janet Lewis (disambiguation) =

Janet Lewis may refer to:

- Janet Cook Lewis (1855–1947), American librarian and bookbinder
- Janet Lewis (1899–1998), American novelist, poet, and librettist
- Janet Lewis-Jones (1950–2017), member for Wales on the BBC Trust
