= Janet Holmes =

Janet Holmes may refer to:

- Janet Holmes (poet), American poet and professor
- Janet Holmes (linguist) (born 1947), New Zealand sociolinguist

== See also ==
- Janet Holmes à Court (born 1943), Australian businesswoman
