= Janet Allen =

American industrial engineer

Janet Katherine Allen is an American biochemist and industrial engineer whose research concerns uncertainty in the engineering design process and its quantification and control through robust design processes, statistical methods, simulation of alternative designs, and the use of the design of experiments to systematically explore alternatives in large design spaces. She is a professor of industrial and systems engineering at the University of Oklahoma, where she holds the John and Mary Moore Chair of Engineering.

== Education and career ==
Allen earned a bachelor's degree in life sciences from the Massachusetts Institute of Technology in 1967. She completed a Ph.D. in biophysics at the University of California, Berkeley in 1973.

After postdoctoral research at the University of Southern California, she moved in 1975 to the University of New South Wales in Australia, as a professional officer in the department of biochemistry, part-time lecturer in the Centre for Biomedical Engineering, and scientist at the Royal Prince Alfred Hospital. She returned to the US in 1981, as a researcher in biochemistry at Rice University and, for the next several years, at Baylor University.

After leaving academia for industry in 1987, she returned in 1992 to the George W. Woodruff School of Mechanical Engineering at Georgia Tech, initially as a senior research scientist. Eventually becoming a regular-rank faculty member there, she retired in 2009 as professor emerita. In the same year, she took her present position as John and Mary Moore Chair at the University of Oklahoma.

== Books ==
Allen's books include:

- Integrated Design of Multiscale, Multifunctional Materials and Products (with David L. McDowell, Jitesh Panchal, Hae-Jin Choi, Carolyn Seepersad, and Farrokh Mistree, Elsevier, 2010)
- Architecting Networked Engineered Systems: Manufacturing Systems Design for Industry 4.0 (with Jelena Milisavljevic-Syed, Sesh Commuri, and Farrokh Mistree, Springer, 2020)
- Architecting Robust Co-Design of Materials, Products, and Manufacturing Processes (with Anand Balu Nellippallil, B. P. Gautham, Amarendra K. Singh, and Farrokh Mistree, Springer, 2020)

== Recognition ==
Allen was named a Fellow of the American Society of Mechanical Engineers (ASME) in 2005. She was the 2019 winner of the ASME Ruth and Joel Spira Outstanding Design Educator Award, in part recognizing her work creating and administering an ASME program funding students to travel and present their work at ASME conferences.
