= Janet Beihoffer =

American politician

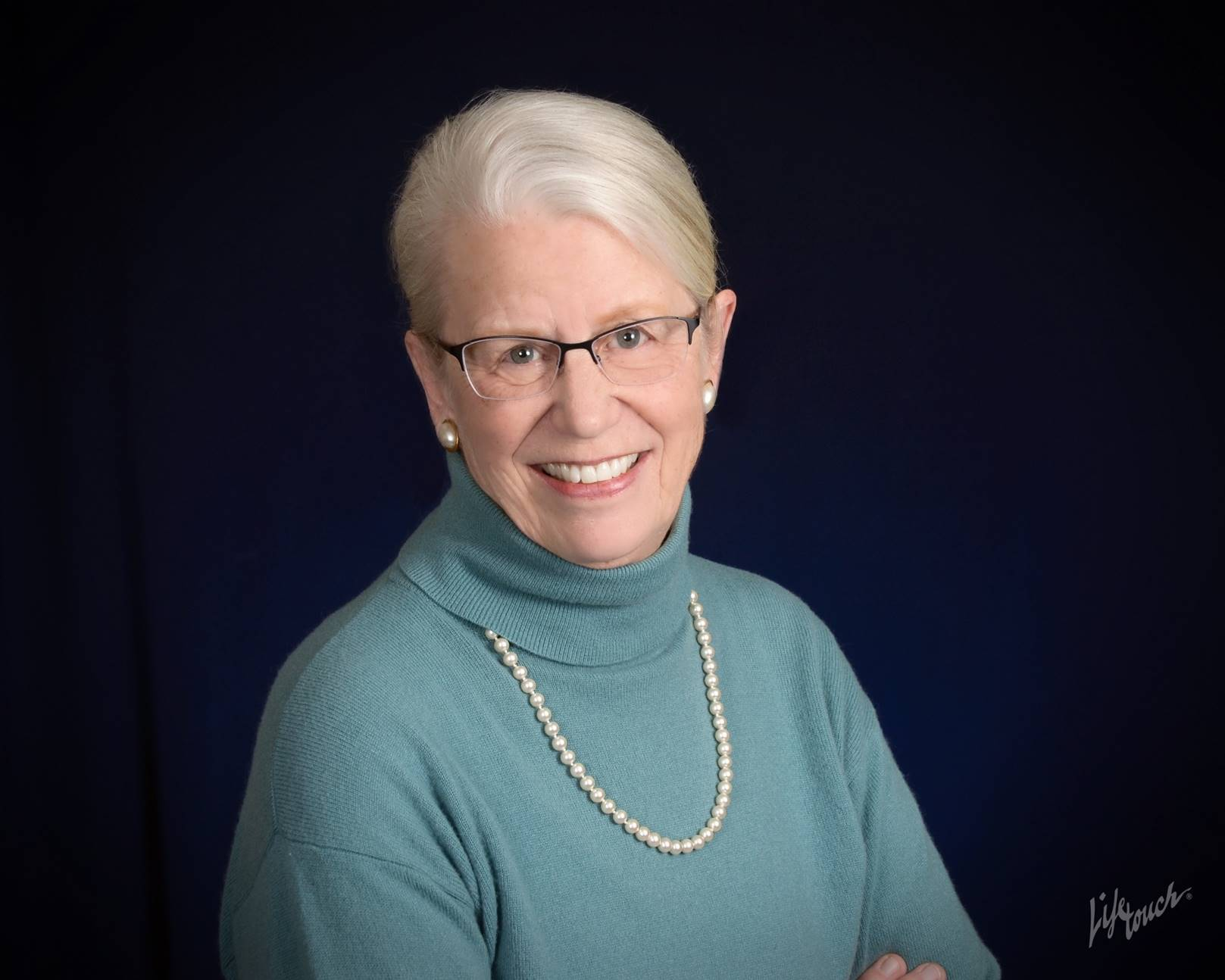
- Janet Beihoffer (2017)
- Education: Miami University; George Washington University
- Political party: Republican
- Website: www.mngop.com

Janet Beihoffer is a Republican serving as the Minnesota National Committeewoman, first elected in 2012.

== Education ==
Beihoffer earned a B.S. in Education from Miami University of Ohio, an MBA in Accounting from the George Washington University and became a registered CPA (now inactive) in Virginia.

== Career ==
Janet Beihoffer was elected to the Republican National Committee as the National Committeewoman for Minnesota in 2012 and re-elected for a second term in 2016. After retiring from her career at IBM where she was a line-of-business marketing manager for five states, she now is an adjunct professor at Metropolitan State University where she teaches Management Information Systems.

== Political Background ==
She developed and implemented statewide poll challenging operations in 2005; became the Statewide Director of Election Operations for the MN GOP from 2008 to 2012 and served as the Chair of the Minnesota 2nd Congressional District from 2008 to 2009. Beihoffer was on the Board of Directors for the Volunteers Enlisted to Assist People from 1990 to 1998 and the Mount Olivet Lutheran Church Board of Life and Growth from 1998 to 2004.

== Community service ==
Beihoffer served on the board of directors for the Volunteers Enlisted to Assist People from 1990 to 1998. She later served on the Mount Olivet Lutheran Church Board of Life and Growth from 1998 to 2004.
