= Janet Myhre =

American statistician

Janet M. Myhre is an American statistician, the Dengler-Dykema Professor Emeritus of Mathematics and Mathematical Economics at Claremont McKenna College.

Myhre did her undergraduate studies at Pacific Lutheran University, earned a master's degree at the University of Washington, and completed her doctorate at Stockholm University. She joined the Claremont McKenna faculty in 1962. There, in 1975, she was the founding director of the Reed Institute for Decision Science, later to become the Reed Institute for Applied Statistics.

In 2004 she was named a fellow of the American Statistical Association.
