= Page (surname) =

Page is an occupational surname derived from page. It may refer to:

== People ==
=== A ===
- Alan Page (born 1945), American football player and judge
- Alfred Page (Australian politician) (1843–1911), member of the Tasmanian Legislative Council
- Alfred R. Page (1859–1931), American lawyer and politician from New York
- Alfred Page (priest) (1912–1988), Archdeacon of Leeds
- Anita Page (1910–2008), American silent film actress
- Annette Page (1932–2017), English ballerina
- Anthony Page (1935–2026), British stage and film director
- Antony Page (fl. 1980s–2020s), dean of the Florida International University School of Law
- Ambrose Page (1723–1791), Rhode Island admiralty judge who declined appointment as an associate justice of the Rhode Island Supreme Court
- Arthur W. Page (1883–1960), early practitioner of public relations

=== B ===
- Bettie Page (1923–2008), American pinup model
- Bob Page (disambiguation)
- Bradley Page (1901–1985), American actor
- Brenda Page (died 1978), British murder victim

=== C ===
- Charles Page (disambiguation)
- Chris Page, radio presenter
- Christopher Page (born 1952), scholar on medieval music
- Christopher Nigel Page (1942–2022), Scottish botanist
- Clarence Page (born 1947), newspaper columnist
- Cleo Page (1928–1979), American blues guitarist and singer

=== D ===
- Denys Page, (1908–1978) British classical scholar
- Diamond Dallas Page (born 1956), American professional wrestler and actor
- Diana Page (born 1965), South African artist
- Don Page (physicist) (born 1948), American-born Canadian theoretical physicist
- Dorothy Page (actress) (1904–1961), American actress
- Dorothy Page (historian), New Zealand historian

=== E ===
- E. M. Page (1893–1957) Oregon Supreme Court justice
- Earle Page (1880–1961), 11th prime minister of Australia, brother of Harold and Rodger
- Elliot Page (born 1987), Canadian actor
- Elwin L. Page (1876–1974), justice of the New Hampshire Supreme Court
- Emily Rebecca Page (1834–1862), American poet
- Ernie Page (athlete) (1910–1973), English sprinter
- Ernie Page (politician) (1935–2018), Australian politician

=== F ===
- Francis Page (judge) (1661–1741), English judge and politician
- Francis Page (died 1803) (1726–1803), English politician
- Frank Page (politician) (1824–1899), founder of Cary, North Carolina
- Frederick Page (1917–2005), English aircraft designer
- Frederick Handley Page (1885–1962), British aircraft manufacturer

=== G ===
- Gale Page (1910–1983), American singer and actress
- Geneviève Page (1927–2025), French actress
- Geoffrey Page (1920–2000), Royal Air Force pilot
- George Page (disambiguation)
- Geraldine Page (1924–1987), American actress
- Glenys Page (1940–2012), New Zealand cricketer
- Greg Page (disambiguation), including people named Gregory

=== H ===
- Harold Page (1888–1942), Australian army officer and public servant, brother of Earle and Rodger
- Hiram Page (c. 1800–1852), American early Latter Day Saint and one of the Eight Witnesses to the Book of Mormon's golden plates

=== I ===
- Ian Page (conductor) (born 1963), British conductor
- Ian Page (singer) (born 1960), British singer and author

=== J ===
- Jack Page (disambiguation)
- James Page (disambiguation), including people named Jim or Jimmy
- Jennifer Page (born 1944), former Chief Executive of the London Millennium Dome
- Jimmy Page (born 1944), musician with Led Zeppelin
- Joanna Page (born 1977), Welsh actress
- John Page (disambiguation)
- Joy Page (1924–2008), American actress
- June Page, British actress

=== K ===
- Katie Page (born 1956), Australian CEO of Harvey Norman
- Kimberly Page (born 1970), American professional wrestling valet and actress

=== L ===
- Larcena Pennington Page (1837–1913), American pioneer
- Larry Page (born 1973), co-founder of Google
- Larry Page (singer and manager) (1936–2024)
- Leigh Page (1884–1952), American physicist

=== M ===
- Malcolm Page (disambiguation)
- Mann Page (1749–1781), American lawyer, politician and planter
- Mary Boomer Page, Chicago educator
- Michael Page (disambiguation)
- Murriel Page (born 1975), American basketball coach

=== N ===
- Neil Page (born 1944), Australian former baseball player
- Norman Page (died 1935), English actor

=== O ===
- Olivia Page (footballer, born 2005), New Zealand footballer
- Oran Page (1908–1954), American jazz musician

=== P ===
- P. K. Page (1916–2010), Canadian writer
- Patti Page (1927–2013), American singer
- Payton Page (born 2002), American football player

=== R ===
- Regé-Jean Page, British actor
- Richard Page (disambiguation)
- Robert Page (disambiguation)
- Rodger Page (1878–1965), Australian missionary, brother of Earle and Harold
- Roy M. Page (1890–1958), New York politician
- Rutherford Page (c. 1880–1912), American early aviator

=== S ===
- Simon C. Page, British graphic designer
- Samuel Page (born 1976), American actor
- Stephen Page (born 1965), Australian dancer and choreographer
- Steven Page (born 1970), Canadian musician

=== T ===
- Thomas Page (disambiguation), including people named Tom or Tommy
- Tim Page (disambiguation)
- Tony Page (fl. 1970s–2020s), British politician

=== V ===
- Val Page (1892–1978), British motorcycle designer

=== W ===
- William Page (disambiguation)
- Winifred Mary Page (1887–1965), British botanist

=== First name unknown ===
- Page (Surrey cricketer), 18th century English cricketer

== Fictional characters ==
- Bob Page, in the computer game Deus Ex
- Neal Page, in the 1987 film Planes, Trains and Automobiles, played by Steve Martin
- Sally Jones / Alison Page, in the 1997 American film Beverly Hills Ninja
- Valerie Page, in the comic book series V for Vendetta
- Victoria Page, in the film The Red Shoes
- Victoria Page, in the Dream Theater concept album Metropolis Pt. 2: Scenes from a Memory
- Wilf and Wilma Page, in The Magic Key, a British animated television series

== See also ==
- Pages (surname)
- General Page (disambiguation)
- Justice Page (disambiguation)
- Senator Page (disambiguation)
- Pagé
- Paige (name)
- Pagan (disambiguation)
