= Page =

Page most commonly refers to:

- Page (paper), one side of a leaf of paper, as in a book

Page, PAGE, pages, or paging may also refer to:

== Roles ==
- Page (assistance occupation), a professional occupation
- Page (servant), traditionally a young male servant
- Page (wedding attendant)

== People and fictional characters ==
- Page (given name), a list of people
- Page (surname), a list of people and fictional characters
- Pages (surname)
- H. A. Page, a pen name of Scottish author Alexander Hay Japp (1836–1905)

== Places ==
=== Australia ===
- Page, Australian Capital Territory, a suburb of Canberra
- Division of Page, New South Wales
- Pages River, a tributary of the Hunter River catchment in New South Wales, Australia
- The Pages, South Australia, two islands and a reef
  - The Pages Conservation Park, a protected area in South Australia

=== United States ===
- Page, Arizona, a city
- Page, Minneapolis, Minnesota, a neighborhood
- Page, Nebraska, a village
- Page, North Dakota, a city
- Page, Oklahoma, an unincorporated community
- Page, Virginia
- Page, Washington, a ghost town
- Page, West Virginia, a census-designated place
- Page Airport (disambiguation)
- Page City, Kansas
- Page County, Iowa
- Page County, Virginia
- Page Township, Mille Lacs County, Minnesota
- Page Township, Cass County, North Dakota, Cass County, North Dakota
- Page Valley, Virginia, a valley associated with the Shenandoah Valley

== Science and technology ==
=== Computing ===
- Page (computer memory), a block of virtual memory
  - Paging, a method of data retrieval
- Page (Flash memory)
- Bank switching, sometimes known as paging
- Electronic page, formatting digital documents into pages
- Multiple buffering, also known as paging
- Ogg page, a unit of data in an Ogg bitstream
- Pages (word processor), a word processor and page layout application from Apple Inc.
- PAGE, an algorithm for computing the orientable genus of a graph
- Web page

=== Other uses in science and technology ===
- Page, to use a pager to contact a person
- PAGE, the acronym of Polyacrylamide gel electrophoresis
  - SDS-PAGE, sodium dodecyl sulfate polyacrylamide gel electrophoresis
- Skirt lifter, a device for use with a long skirt, also known as a page

== Arts, entertainment, and media ==
=== Literature ===
- Page (novel), a 2000 novel by Tamora Pierce
- The Pages (novel), a 2008 novel by Murray Bail
- Page, a 2002 posthumous collection of poetry by Hannah Weiner
- Pages & Co., a fictional bookshop in the eponymous children's book series by Anna James

=== Music ===
==== Groups and labels ====
- Page Music, a record label
- Page (South Korean band), a Korean outfit
- Page (Swedish band), a Swedish synthpop outfit
- Pages (band), an American pop rock band

==== Recordings ====
- A Page, by Yuqi, 2021
- Page (album), by Kang Seung-yoon, 2021
- "Page", a song by Vixen from the album Tangerine, 1998
- "Page", a song by Band-Maid from the album Conqueror, 2019
- Pages (EP), a 2007 EP by There for Tomorrow
- Pages (Shane & Shane album), 2007
- Pages (Sexy Zone album), 2019
- Pages (Shaznay Lewis album), 2024
- Pages, a 2005 album by Bering Strait
- Pages, a 2009 album by Julie Feeney
- Pages, a 2012 album by Versailles

== Other uses ==
- Page, an announcement requesting someone's presence; see Public address
- Page, a brand of toilet paper in the Netherlands by Kimberly-Clark
- PAGE, the acronym of the Obama initiative Presidential Ambassadors for Global Entrepreneurship
- PAGE, the acronym of the Pakistan & Gulf Economist, a weekly business magazine published from Karachi, Pakistan
- Page Corps, a military academy in Imperial Russia
- Page Organ Company, producer of theatre organs
- Page playoff system, a playoff format used primarily in softball and curling at the championship level
- Past Global Changes, a project of the International Geosphere-Biosphere Programme

== See also ==
- Page boy (disambiguation)
- Pager (disambiguation)
- Paige (disambiguation)
