= Paige =

Paige may refer to:

== People and fictional characters ==
- Paige (name), a given name, middle name, or surname, including lists of people and fictional characters
- Paige (wrestler) (Saraya Bevis, born 1992), British professional wrestler

== Geography ==
- Mount Paige, in the Phillips Mountains, Marie Byrd Land, Antarctica
- Paige, Texas, United States, an unincorporated community
- Paige, Virginia, United States, an unincorporated community

== Other ==
- Paige (band), a UK pop-rock band
- Paige (singer), a New Zealand singer-songwriter
- Paige automobile (1908–1927), an American luxury automobile company
- Graham-Paige, a former automobile manufacturer, successor to the Paige automobile company
- Paige Compositor, an invention to replace the human typesetter of a printing press with a mechanical arm
- Paige v. Banks, an 1872 United States Supreme Court case

== See also ==
- Page (disambiguation)
