= Paige (name) =

- Pronunciation: /peɪdʒ/ PAYJ
- Gender: Unisex
- Language: English

Origin
- Meaning: page
- Region of origin: England

Other names
- Related names: Page (given name); Page (surname)

Paige is an English surname and given name. The surname is a variant of Page, an occupational name derived from page. Its use as a given name was transferred from the surname. It became popular as a girl's name in the 20th-century in the United States.

== People ==
=== Given name ===
- Paige, WWE ring name of British professional wrestler Saraya Bevis
- Paige Ackerson-Kiely (born 1975), modern American poet
- Paige Braddock, cartoonist of Jane's World
- Paige Bradley (born 1974), American artist and sculptor
- Paige Bueckers (born 2001), American basketball player
- Paige Chua (born 1981), Singaporean model and television actress
- Paige Conners (born 2000), Israeli-American pairs figure skater
- Paige Davis (born 1969), American actress
- Paige DeSorbo (born 1992), American reality star and podcast host
- Paige Gordon (born 1973), retired female diver from Canada
- Paige Haley (born 1966), musician and producer
- Paige Hareb (born 1990), professional surfer from New Zealand
- Paige Hemmis (born 1972), American television personality, host of Extreme Makeover: Home Edition
- Paige Hurd (born 1992), American actress
- Paige Jones (born 2002), American ski jumper
- Paige Kreegel (born 1958), American politician
- Paige Layle (born 1998), Canadian autism advocate
- Paige Lawrence (born 1990), Canadian pair skater
- Paige Lewis (singer-songwriter), American singer-songwriter
- Paige Mackenzie (born 1983), American professional golfer
- Paige Mayo (born 1986), American professional wrestling personality
- Paige Miles (born 1985), American singer and American Idol contestant
- Paige Moss (born 1973), American actress
- Paige Niemann, American social media personality
- Paige O'Hara (born 1956), the voice of Belle in Disney's Beauty and the Beast
- Paige Omartian (born 1990), American Christian singer-songwriter
- Paige Palmer (died 2009), American fitness expert
- Paige Patterson (born 1942), president of Southwestern Baptist Theological Seminary in Fort Worth, Texas
- Paige Pearce (born 1995), American archer
- Paige Peterson (born 1955), American painter and illustrator
- Paige Railey (born 1987), American sailor, races in the Laser Radial division
- Paige Renkoski (born 1960), American woman who went missing in 1990
- Paige Rense (1929–2021), editor emeritus of Architectural Digest, editor-in-chief from 1975 to 2010
- Paige Rini (born 2000), Canadian water skier
- Paige Segal (born 1987), American actress
- Paige Shand-Haami, film and television actress
- Paige Spara, American actress
- Paige Spiranac (born 1993), American professional golfer and social media personality
- Paige St. John, American journalist for the Sarasota Herald-Tribune
- Paige Summers (born 1976), American adult model
- Paige Turco (born 1965), American actress
- Paige VanZant (born 1994), professional mixed martial arts fighter
- Paige Young, Playboy's Playmate of the Month in November 1964
- Paige Zemina (born 1968), former American college and international swimmer

=== Surname ===
- Alonzo C. Paige (1797–1868), New York politician and judge
- Bella Paige (born 2001), Australian singer
- Bruce Paige (born 1948), newsreader in Brisbane, Australia
- Calvin Paige (1848–1930), U.S. Representative from Massachusetts
- Caroline Paige (born 1961), the first officer in the Royal Air Force to have a sex change
- Chantelle Paige (born 1988), American singer-songwriter and actress
- Constantin Le Paige (1852–1929), Belgian mathematician
- David R. Paige (1844–1901), U.S. Representative from Ohio
- Don Paige (born 1956), retired middle-distance runner from the United States
- Elaine Paige (born 1948), English singer and actress
- Elijah Paige (born 2005), American football player
- Gilbert Paige (c. 1595 – 1647), Mayor of Barnstaple
- Glenn D. Paige (1929–2017), American political scientist
- Janis Paige (1922–2024), American film, musical theatre and television actress
- Jason Paige (born 1969), American singer, writer and producer, and stage, film, and television actor
- Jean Paige (1895–1990), American film actress of the silent era
- Jennifer Paige (born 1973), American singer-songwriter
- Kathleen Paige (born 1948), American Program Director of Aegis Ballistic Missile Defense
- Kevin Paige (born 1966), recording artist on Chrysalis
- Kobra Paige (born 1988), lead vocalist for Canadian heavy metal band Kobra and the Lotus]
- Kymberly Paige (born 1961), American model and actress
- Mabel Paige (1880–1954), American film actress
- Mabeth Hurd Paige (1869–1961), Minnesota politician
- Makari Paige (born 2002), American football player
- Marcus Paige (born 1993), American college basketball player
- Mitchell Paige (1918–2003), recipient of the Medal of Honor from World War II
- Pat Paige (1882–1939), Major League Baseball pitcher
- Peter Paige (born 1969), American actor, director, and screenwriter
- Richard G. L. Paige (1846–1904), one of the first African-Americans delegates to be elected in Virginia
- Robert Paige (1911–1987), actor, TV newscaster and political correspondent
- Robin Paige, pen name of Susan Wittig Albert (born 1940), American mystery writer
- Rod Paige (1933–2025), 7th United States Secretary of Education from 2001 to 2005
- Satchel Paige (1906–1982), American baseball player
- Seneca Paige (1788–1856), American-born businessman and political figure in Canada East
- Stephone Paige (born 1961), former professional American football player
- Tarah Paige (born 1982), American gymnast, dancer and actress
- Tony Paige (born 1962), former professional American football player
- Tony Paige (born 1953), American radio talk show host and boxing color analyst
- Woody Paige (born 1946), American sports columnist
- Yasmin Paige (born 1991), English actress

== Fictional characters ==
- Paige Dineen, in the television series Scorpion
- Paige Fox, in the FoxTrot comic
- Paige Guthrie, member of Marvel Comics team the X-Men
- Paige Matheson, lead character in the primetime serial Knots Landing; played by Nicollette Sheridan
- Paige Matthews, lead character on the American television series Charmed; played by Rose McGowan
- Paige Michalchuk, on the Canadian television series Degrassi: The Next Generation
- Paige Novick, a character from Better Call Saul
- Paige Popplewell, from the British soap opera Doctors
- Paige Smith, in the Australian television series Neighbours
- Paige Swanson, in the television series Young Sheldon
- Paige Tico, in the Star Wars film The Last Jedi

== See also ==
- Paich
