= Paich =

Paich is a surname. Notable people with the surname include:

- David Paich (born 1954), American musician, singer, songwriter, and record producer
- Marty Paich (1925–1995), American pianist

== See also ==
- Paige (name)
- Pich
