= Richard Paige =

Richard Paige may refer to:

- Richard Paige, penname used by writer Dean Koontz
- Richard G. L. Paige (1846–1904), member of the Virginia House of Delegates
