= Pagination (disambiguation) =

Pagination is the process of dividing information (content) into discrete pages, either electronic pages or printed pages.

Pagination may also refer to:

- Bekker pagination, a system of reference and organization used in modern editions and translations of Aristotle
- Kühn pagination, a system of reference and organization used in modern editions and translations of Galen
- Stephanus pagination, a system of reference and organization used in modern editions and translations of Plato
- Paging, a computer memory management scheme

== See also ==
- Page (disambiguation)
