= Picht =

Picht is a German surname. Notable people with the surname include:

- Edith Picht-Axenfeld (1914–2001), German pianist and harpsichordist
- Robert Picht (1937–2008), German academic

== See also ==
- Pich
