= Tony Paige =

Tony Paige may refer to:

- Tony Paige (American football) (born 1962) American football player
- Tony Paige (boxing) (born 1953), American radio talk show host and boxing color analyst

== See also ==
- Tony Page, British politician
