= Pych =

Pych is a surname. Notable people with this surname include:

- Mirosław Pych (born 1972), Polish Paralympic athlete
- Rick Pych, American sports executive

== See also ==
- Pich
