= Twin Rivers, New Jersey =

Populated place in Mercer County, New Jersey, US

- Census-designated place
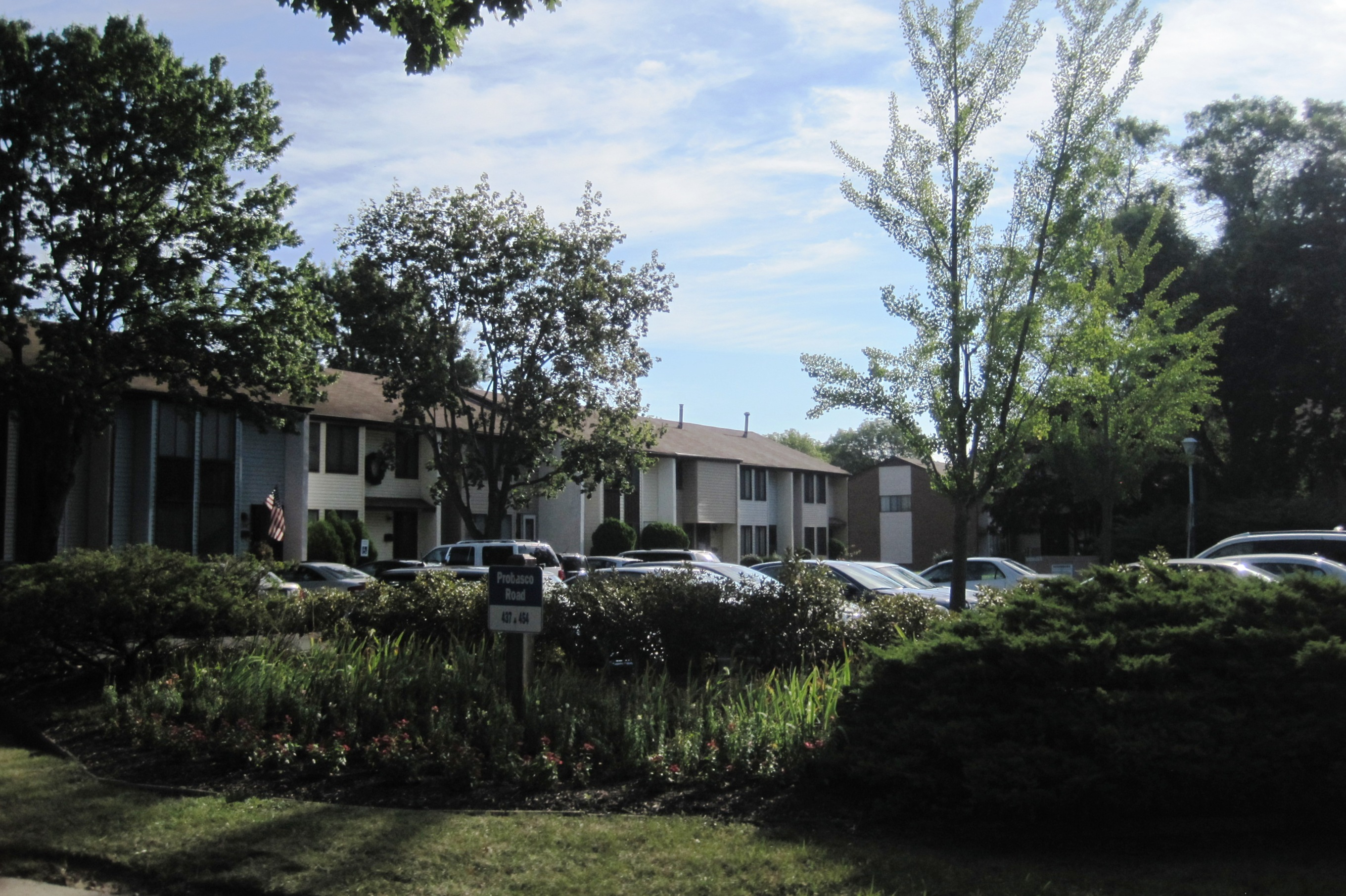
- Typical townhouse development in Twin Rivers

- Location in Mercer County and the state of New Jersey.

- Location in Mercer County Location in New Jersey Location in the United States
- Coordinates: 40.263194°N 74.487843°W
- Country: United States
- State: New Jersey
- County: Mercer
- Township: East Windsor

Area
  - Total: 1.30 sq mi (3.37 km^{2})
  - Land: 1.26 sq mi (3.27 km^{2})
  - Water: 0.039 sq mi (0.10 km^{2}) 2.99%
- Elevation: 108 ft (33 m)

Population (2020)
  - Total: 7,787
  - Density: 6,180.2/sq mi (2,386.2/km^{2})
- Time zone: UTC−05:00 (Eastern (EST))
  - Summer (DST): UTC−04:00 (Eastern (EDT))
- ZIP Code: 08520 (Hightstown)
- FIPS code: 34-74330
- GNIS feature ID: 02390412
- Website: www.twinrivers-nj.com

Twin Rivers is an unincorporated community and census-designated place (CDP) in East Windsor Township, in Mercer County, in the U.S. state of New Jersey. As of the 2020 United States census, Twin Rivers' population was 7,787, its highest decennial count ever and an increase of 344 (+4.6%) from the 7,443 recorded at the 2010 census, which in turn reflected an increase of 21 (+0.3%) from the 7,422 counted in the 2000 census. Twin Rivers was the first planned unit development in New Jersey.

== Geography ==
Twin Rivers is in the eastern corner of Mercer County, bordered to the east by Middlesex County. The borough of Hightstown is 2 miles (3 km) to the west. Twin Rivers is located along Route 33 near exit 8 of the New Jersey Turnpike and Route 133; Route 33 leads east 12 miles (19 km) to Freehold and west through Hightstown 16 miles (26 km) to Trenton, the state capital.

According to the U.S. Census Bureau, the Twin Rivers CDP has a total area of 1.30 square miles (3.37 km^{2}), including 1.26 square miles (3.26 km^{2}) of land and 0.04 square miles (0.10 km^{2}) of water (3.00%). Twin Rivers is bordered by two waterways: the Millstone River to the north, and its tributary, Rocky Brook, to the south. Via the Millstone River, the community is within the watershed of the Raritan River flowing to New York Bay.

== Community ==
Twin Rivers is a mainly residential community located between Monroe Township and Hightstown. It contains two elementary schools; Ethel McKnight Elementary School (located on the south side) and Perry L. Drew Elementary School (located on the north), both part of the East Windsor Regional School District. Twin Rivers is divided into four sections, known as "quads", with quads 1 & 2 on the southern side of Route 33, and quads 3 & 4 located to the north. Twin Rivers contains a community room, a shopping center and a preschool, all located in quads 1 and 2. The shopping center has restaurants, a gym, a nail salon, and a laundromat. Additionally, each quad has its own swimming pool.

== Demographics ==
Historical population
| Census | Pop. | Note | %± |
|---|---|---|---|
| 1980 | 7,742 | | — |
| 1990 | 7,715 | | −0.3% |
| 2000 | 7,422 | | −3.8% |
| 2010 | 7,443 | | 0.3% |
| 2020 | 7,787 | | 4.6% |
Population sources: 1950 1960 1970; 1980 1990 2000; 2010 2020

Twin Rivers first appeared as a census designated place in the 1980 U.S. census.

=== 2020 census ===
As of the 2020 census, Twin Rivers had a population of 7,787. The median age was 37.9 years. 23.1% of residents were under the age of 18 and 13.7% of residents were 65 years of age or older. For every 100 females there were 101.9 males, and for every 100 females age 18 and over there were 98.6 males age 18 and over.

99.1% of residents lived in urban areas, while 0.9% lived in rural areas.

There were 2,726 households in Twin Rivers, of which 37.5% had children under the age of 18 living in them. Of all households, 51.0% were married-couple households, 17.5% were households with a male householder and no spouse or partner present, and 25.2% were households with a female householder and no spouse or partner present. About 22.7% of all households were made up of individuals and 9.0% had someone living alone who was 65 years of age or older.

There were 2,809 housing units, of which 3.0% were vacant. The homeowner vacancy rate was 0.8% and the rental vacancy rate was 4.3%.

Racial composition as of the 2020 census
| Race | Number | Percent |
|---|---|---|
| White | 3,121 | 40.1% |
| Black or African American | 901 | 11.6% |
| American Indian and Alaska Native | 58 | 0.7% |
| Asian | 789 | 10.1% |
| Native Hawaiian and Other Pacific Islander | 2 | 0.0% |
| Some other race | 1,844 | 23.7% |
| Two or more races | 1,072 | 13.8% |
| Hispanic or Latino (of any race) | 3,093 | 39.7% |

=== 2010 census ===
The 2010 United States census counted 7,443 people, 2,671 households, and 1,931 families in the CDP. The population density was 5,814.5 people per square mile (2,245.0 people/km^{2}). There were 2,808 housing units at an average density of 2,193.6 units per square mile (847.0 units/km^{2}). The racial makeup was 63.27% (4,709) White, 12.00% (893) Black or African American, 1.25% (93) Native American, 7.66% (570) Asian, 0.01% (1) Pacific Islander, 12.25% (912) from other races, and 3.56% (265) from two or more races. Hispanic or Latino of any race were 29.85% (2,222) of the population.

Of the 2,671 households, 33.5% had children under the age of 18; 55.0% were married couples living together; 12.5% had a female householder with no husband present and 27.7% were non-families. Of all households, 23.0% were made up of individuals and 6.6% had someone living alone who was 65 years of age or older. The average household size was 2.79 and the average family size was 3.24.

23.4% of the population were under the age of 18, 8.5% from 18 to 24, 30.2% from 25 to 44, 27.8% from 45 to 64, and 10.0% who were 65 years of age or older. The median age was 36.9 years. For every 100 females, the population had 99.1 males. For every 100 females ages 18 and older there were 96.2 males.

=== 2000 census ===
As of the 2000 United States census there were 7,422 people, 2,748 households, and 2,033 families living in the CDP. The population density was 2,274.3 people/km^{2} (5,890 people/mi^{2}). There were 2,818 housing units at an average density of 863.5 units/km^{2} (2,236 units/mi^{2}). The racial makeup of the CDP was 76.25% White, 10.16% African American, 0.08% Native American, 6.25% Asian, 0.19% Pacific Islander, 4.61% from other races, and 2.47% from two or more races. Hispanic or Latino of any race were 14.63% of the population.

There were 2,748 households, out of which 33.4% had children under the age of 18 living with them, 58.1% were married couples living together, 11.0% had a female householder with no husband present, and 26.0% were non-families. 21.2% of all households were made up of individuals, and 4.3% had someone living alone who was 65 years of age or older. The average household size was 2.70 and the average family size was 3.12.

In the CDP the population was spread out, with 23.5% under the age of 18, 8.7% from 18 to 24, 30.6% from 25 to 44, 30.9% from 45 to 64, and 6.4% who were 65 years of age or older. The median age was 37 years. For every 100 females, there were 97.6 males. For every 100 females age 18 and over, there were 94.5 males.

The median income for a household in the CDP was $62,760, and the median income for a family was $69,494. Males had a median income of $45,840 versus $33,393 for females. The per capita income for the CDP was $26,501. About 2.7% of families and 4.6% of the population were below the poverty line, including 4.7% of those under age 18 and 4.5% of those age 65 or over.
