= The Pages =

Island group in South Australia

Coordinates: 35°46′10″S 138°17′45″E

- Location within South Australia

Geography
- Location: Backstairs Passage

Administration
- Australia

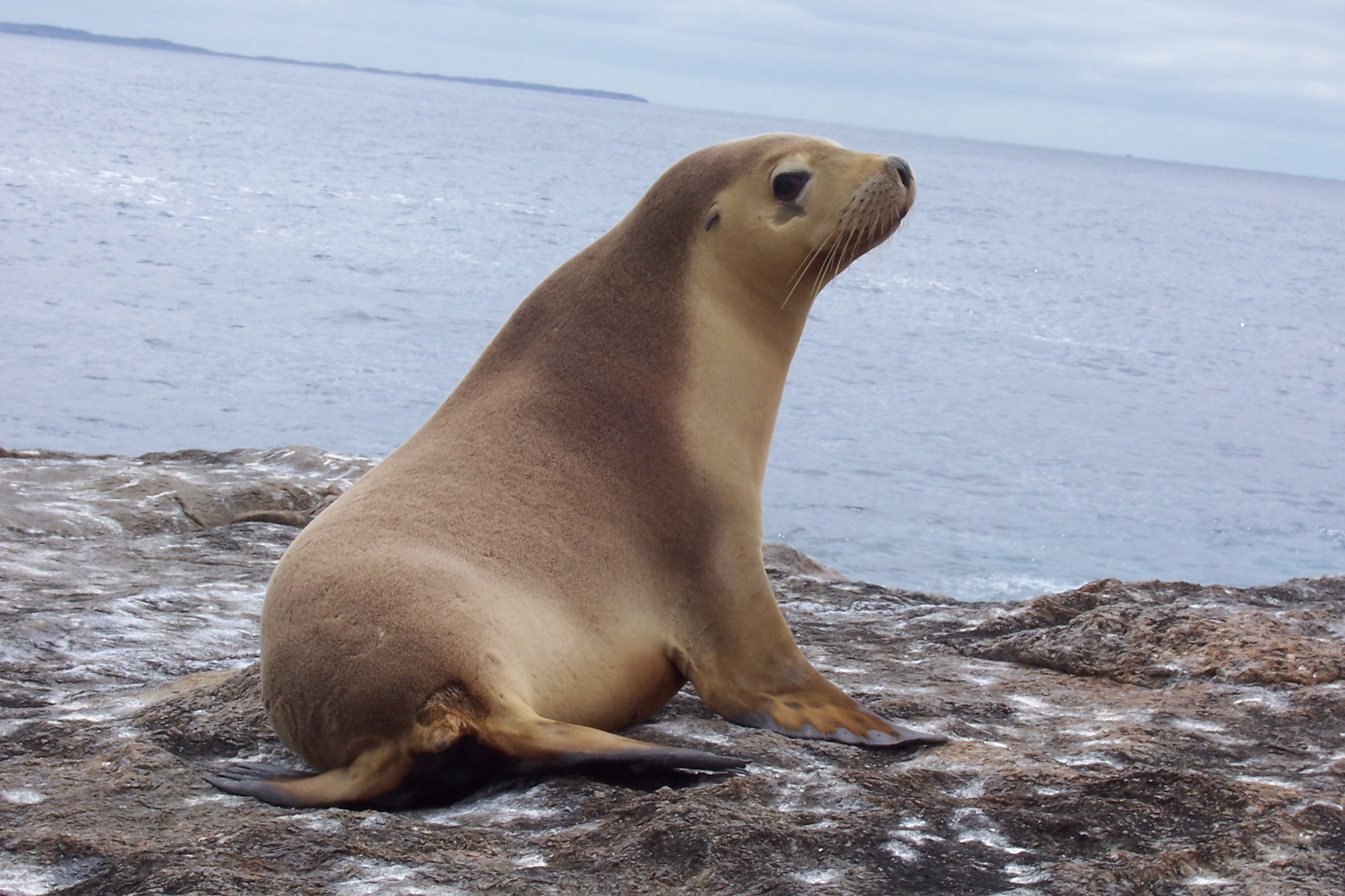
Australian sea lion

The Pages (Kaurna: Metalong) is an island group in the Australian state of South Australia consisting of two small islands, North Page and South Page, and a reef located in Backstairs Passage, a strait separating Kangaroo Island and the Fleurieu Peninsula. The island group has been located with the protected area known as The Pages Conservation Park since 1972.

== History ==
The islands were known to the Aboriginal Kaurna people as Metalong. In Aboriginal lore the islands are those of two women that Nurunderi had saved, but who had subsequently eaten forbidden food and fled him. Nurunderi tracked them for days to the Fleurieu Peninsula where they tried to enter the spirit land, but Nurunderi chanted the song of the winds to raise the sea and sweep the women into the ocean. Nepelle then turned the women to stone and their petrified bodies remain as a warning to women to never eat forbidden food.

They were named "The Pages" by Matthew Flinders on 7 April 1802 from their fancied resemblance to pages guarding their strategic position at the eastern entrance to the strait.

== Description ==
The Pages consist of two main islands, lying about 2 kilometres (1.2 miles) apart, are similar in size. North Page is about 400 metres (1,300 feet) long, 200 metres (660 feet) wide and 24 metres (79 feet) high while South Page is about 450 metres (1,480 feet) long, 170 metres (560 feet) wide and 20 metres (66 feet) high. A reef which is located south-west of South Page includes two adjacent wave-washed islets, rising 1 metre (3 feet 3 inches) or so above sea level, with a combined length of 380 metres (1,250 feet). Geologically, The Pages are constituted of phyllites of the Brukunga Formation, formed from metamorphosed Cambrian sedimentary rocks. The islands are rugged; they contain no beaches and access by sea is difficult. There is a navigational aid on the top of South Page Island.

== Flora and fauna ==
Small pockets of soil on the tops of the islands support patches of vegetation. Recorded plants include variable groundsel, bulbine lily, round-leaved pigface, ruby saltbush and an Atriplex saltbush. Silver gulls breed on the islands, which also support a breeding colony of Australian sea lions.

A little penguin colony existed on the South Page island, with an estimated population of 200-400 birds in 1992. In 2009, the population had declined to "few". An account of the island's fauna from 1884 described little penguins as being "very plentiful" on the South Page island and mentioned the nesting site of a large eagle, which was discovered at an "almost inaccessible" location.

In August 2026, mass deaths of crested terns were discovered on The Pages and Troubridge Island, totalling around 1,000 dead birds. It was "presumed" that they had died of H5N1 bird flu, in a wave which had reached Australia during June. On 23 August, the first confirmed case was detected in a mammal, a long-nosed fur seal found at Beachport, South Australia, leading to fears that the virus may spread to the Australian sea lions on The Pages.

== Protected area status ==
The Pages has enjoyed protected area status since 29 April 1909 starting with declaration as part of a Bird Protection District under the Birds Protection Act 1900 followed by declaration as a closed area under the Animals and Birds Protection Act 1919-1938 in 1955, proclamation as a Fauna Reserve under the Fauna Conservation Act 1964-1965 in 1966, proclamation as a Fauna Conservation Reserve under the Crown Lands Act 1929-1967 in 1967, and concluding with proclamation as The Pages Conservation Park following the enactment of the National Parks and Wildlife Act 1972 in 1972.

== See also ==
- List of islands of Australia
- Page (disambiguation)
