= Page boy =

Page boy or pageboy may refer to:

- Page (servant), a young male servant, especially in medieval times.
- Page boy (wedding attendant) (also ringbearer or coinbearer), a young male attendant at a wedding.
- Pageboy, a hairstyle.
- Motorola Pageboy, the second pager ever produced by Motorola with individual-unit addressing.
  - Motorola Pageboy II.
- Pageboy (memoir), a 2023 book by Elliot Page.
