= Robert Page =

Robert Page may refer to:

== Politicians ==
- Robert Page (Virginia politician) (1765–1840), American politician, U.S. Representative from Virginia
- Robert N. Page (1859–1933), US Congressman from North Carolina
- Robert J. S. Page, mayor of Flint, Michigan, 1856–1857
- Robert Page (MP), Member of Parliament for Old Sarum

== Sports ==
- Rob Page (born 1974), Welsh international footballer and manager
- Robert Page (rower) (1936–1991), former New Zealand rower

== Others ==
- Robert E. Page Jr. (born 1949), American honey bee geneticist
- Robert Morris Page (1903–1992), American physicist; leading figure in the development of radar
- Robert W. Page (1927–2010), Assistant Secretary of the Army (Civil Works)
- Robert Page (soldier) (1920–1945), Australian soldier
- Robert Page (chemist) (1897–1957), New Zealand pacifist and industrial chemist

== See also ==
- Bob Page (disambiguation)
