= General Page =

General Page may refer to:

- Richard Lucian Page (1807–1901), Confederate States Army brigadier general
- George Ham Page (1836–1899), American industrialist
- Max Page (1882–1963), Royal Army Medical Corps Special Reserve major-general
- Jerry D. Page (1915–1989), U.S. Air Force major general
- Wayne H. Page (1922–2001), U.S. Army brigadier general
- Bobby V. Page (born 1951), U.S. Air Force brigadier general
- Jacko Page (born 1959), British Army lieutenant general

== See also ==
- General Paige (disambiguation)
