= General Paige =

General Paige may refer to:

- Emmett Paige Jr. (1931–2017), U.S. Army lieutenant general
- Henry R. Paige (1904–1989), U.S. Marine Corps major general

== See also ==
- General Page (disambiguation)
