= Pager (disambiguation) =

A pager is a telecommunications device similar to a beeper, SMS client, or email appliance.

Pager may also refer to:

== Computers ==
- Pager (GUI), the graphical user interface feature
- Terminal pager, a computer program used to view the contents of a text file

== People ==
- Antal Páger (actor) (1899–1986), Hungarian actor
- Devah Pager (1972–2018), American sociologist
- Antal Páger (canoeist), Hungarian canoer
- Pappu Pager, fictional character played by Satish Kaushik, in the Indian film Deewana Mastana (1997)

== Other uses ==
- PAGER (Prompt Assessment of Global Earthquakes for Response), an earthquake monitoring system run by the US Geological Survey
- "The Pager", an episode of the American series The Wire
- Pager (company), an American mobile healthcare technology company
- Pager Publications, Inc., an American medical education literary organization
- Pager River, the river in northern Uganda

== See also ==
- Page (disambiguation)
- Paging, a computer memory management scheme
