= Windsor Township, New Jersey =

Coordinates: 40.276°N 74.558°W

Windsor was a township (1751–1797) in early Middlesex County, in an area that is now within Mercer County, New Jersey, United States.

The Windsor area was within Piscataway Township when it was chartered on December 18, 1666. This changed upon the formation of Middlesex County in 1683.

New Windsor Township, known later as Windsor Township, was unofficially formed in 1731, and officially created by Royal Charter on March 9, 1751, from a partition of Piscataway Township. The township was named after Windsor, England. Its borders encompassed today's West Windsor Township, all of present-day Princeton up to Nassau Street, and pre-partition East Windsor Township. Both East Windsor Township and West Windsor Township were formed when Windsor Township was divided on February 9, 1797.

The boundaries of old Windsor Township now lie within Mercer County, because the February 22, 1838 formation Mercer County took West Windsor Township and portions of East Windsor Township from Middlesex County.
