= Pagé =

Pagé is a surname.

Notable people with this surname include:

- François-Xavier Pagé (1833–1912), Canadian politician
- Ilse Pagé (born 1939), German actress
- Lorraine Pagé (born 1947), Canadian politician
- Michel Pagé (1949–2013), Canadian politician
- Pierre Pagé (born 1948), Canadian ice hockey coach
- Suzanne Pagé (born 1941), French museum curator
- Sylvain Pagé (born 1961), Canadian politician

== Other ==
- Capitán Juan Pagé, Salta Province, Argentina

== See also ==
- Page (disambiguation)
