= Richard Page =

Richard Page may refer to:

- Richard Page (politician) (born 1941), former Conservative member of parliament in the United Kingdom
- Richard Page (musician) (born 1953), lead singer and bassist in 1980s US band Mr. Mister
- Sir Richard Page (courtier) (died 1548), gentleman of the Privy Chamber at the court of Henry VIII of England
- Richard Lucian Page (1807–1901), United States Navy officer
  - USS Richard L. Page, a Brooke class frigate in the United States Navy
- Richard Page (professor), professor of medicine
- Richard Page (cricketer) (1910–2006), English cricketer and British Army officer
- Rich Page, manager of the Lisa group at Apple Computer in the 1980s
- Rickey Shane Page (born 1984), American professional wrestler

== See also ==
- Richard Paige, penname used by writer Dean Koontz
- Richard G. L. Paige (1846–1904), member of the Virginia House of Delegates
