= Jack Page =

Jack Page may refer to:

- Jack Page (footballer, born 1886) (1886–1951), English footballer who played for Everton, Cardiff City and Merthyr Town
- Jack Page (footballer, born 1893) (1893–1964), English footballer who played for Sunderland
- Jack Page (figure skater) (1900–1947), British figure skater
- Jack Page (politician) (1950–2020), American politician in the Alabama House of Representatives
- Jack Page (musician) (2016-Present), Kiwi musician
- Jack Page, character in Air Cadet

== See also ==
- John Page (disambiguation)
