= John Page =

John Page may refer to:

== Law and politics ==
=== U.K. ===
- John Page (MP for Maldon) (fl. 1391–1407), British politician, MP for Maldon
- John Page (died 1779) (c. 1696–1779), British MP for Chichester and Great Grimsby
- John Page (MP for Harrow West) (1919–2008), British politician

=== U.S. ===
- John Page (Virginia politician) (1743–1808), U.S. Congressman, Governor of Virginia
- John Page (New Hampshire politician) (1787–1865), U.S. Senator, Governor of New Hampshire
- John A. Page (1814–1891), American politician in Vermont
- John B. Page (1826–1885), American politician in Vermont

=== Elsewhere ===
- John Percy Page (1887–1973), Canadian politician in Alberta

== Sports ==
- John Page (cricketer) (fl. 1820), English cricketer
- John Page (figure skater) (1900–1947), British figure skater
- John Page (footballer, born 1901) (1901–1979), English footballer
- John Page (footballer, born 1934) (1934–2006), English footballer

== Others ==
- John Page (planter) (1628–1692), English-born merchant in North America
- John E. Page (1799–1867), American Mormon leader
- John U. D. Page (1904–1950), American army officer
- John Page (banker) (died 2005), British banking executive

== See also ==
- Derek Page, Baron Whaddon (John Derek Page, 1927–2005), British politician
- Jack Page (disambiguation)
- Jonathan Page (disambiguation)
