= East Windsor, New Jersey =

Township in Mercer County, New Jersey, US

- Township
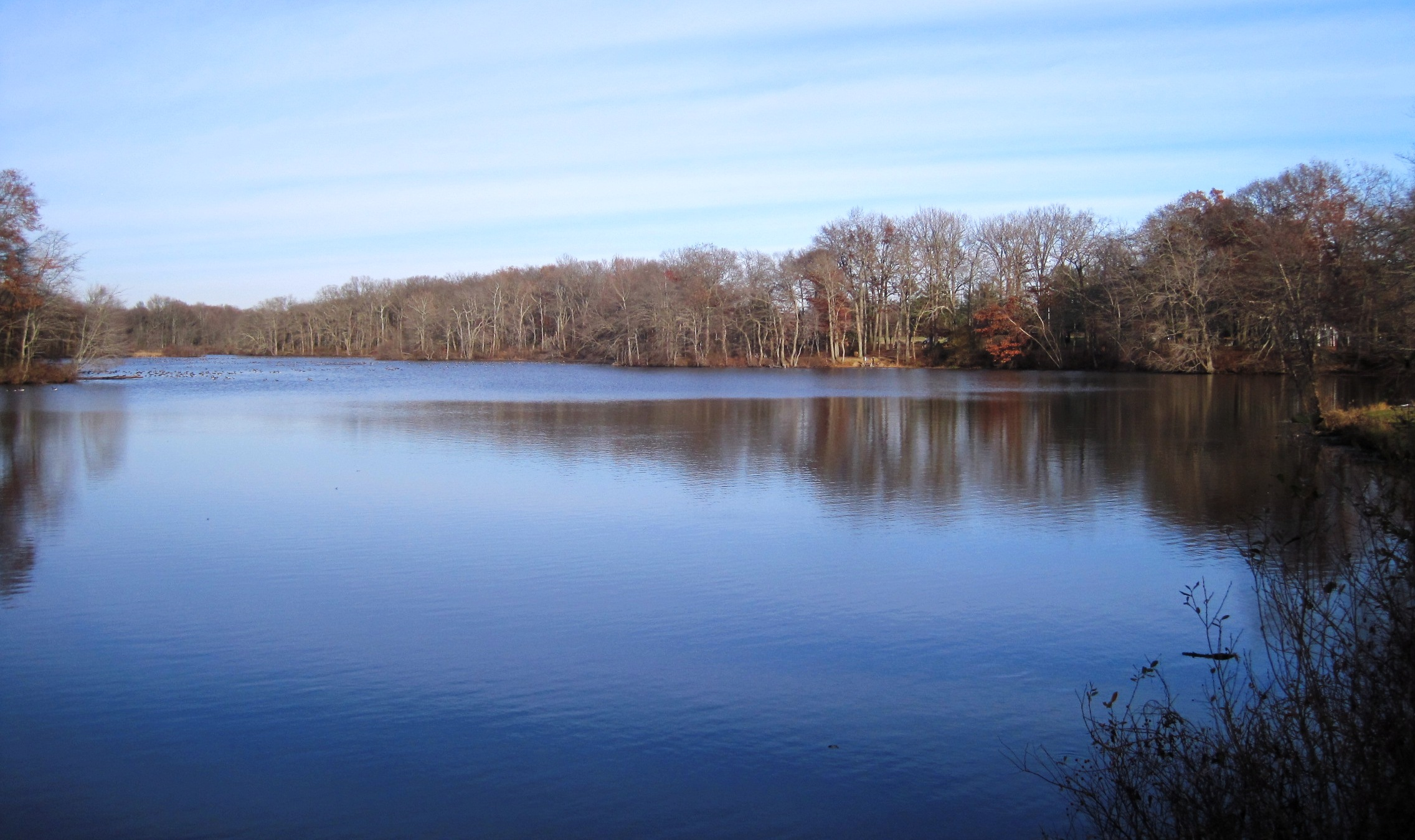
- Etra Lake Park in the eastern portion of the township

- Seal

- Location of East Windsor in Mercer County highlighted in red (right). Inset map: Location of Mercer County in New Jersey highlighted in orange (left).

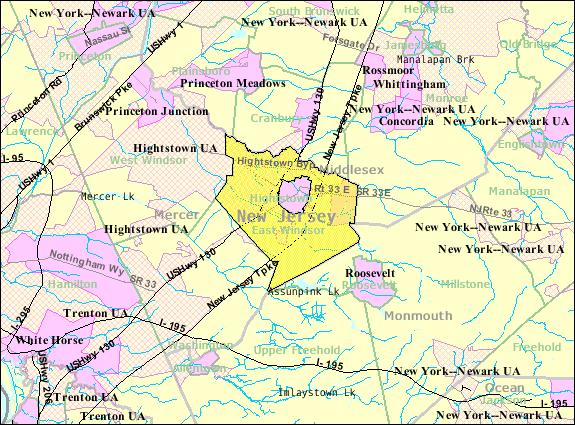
- Census Bureau map of East Windsor Township, New Jersey
- Interactive map of East Windsor, New Jersey
- Location in Mercer County Location in New Jersey Location in the United States
- Coordinates: 40.259139°N 74.533576°W
- Country: United States
- State: New Jersey
- County: Mercer
- Formed: February 9, 1797
- Incorporated: February 21, 1798
- Named for: Windsor, England / Windsor Township

Government
  - Type: Faulkner Act (council–manager)
  - Body: Township Council
  - Mayor: Janice S. Mironov (D, term ends December 31, 2025)
  - Manager: Joy Tozzi
  - Municipal clerk: Allison Quigley

Area
  - Total: 15.66 sq mi (40.55 km^{2})
  - Land: 15.57 sq mi (40.32 km^{2})
  - Water: 0.089 sq mi (0.23 km^{2}) 0.57%
  - Rank: 172nd of 565 in state 7th of 12 in county
- Elevation: 102 ft (31 m)

Population (2020)
  - Total: 30,045
  - Estimate (2023): 29,758
  - Rank: 80th of 565 in state 6th of 12 in county
  - Density: 1,930/sq mi (750/km^{2})
  - Rank: 299th of 565 in state 7th of 12 in county
- Time zone: UTC−05:00 (Eastern (EST))
  - Summer (DST): UTC−04:00 (Eastern (EDT))
- ZIP Code: 08512 & 08520
- Area code: 609
- FIPS code: 3402119780
- GNIS feature ID: 0882123
- Website: www.east-windsor.nj.us

East Windsor is a township in Mercer County, in the U.S. state of New Jersey. Located at the cross-roads between the Delaware Valley region to the southwest and the Raritan Valley region to the northeast, the township is an outer-ring suburb of New York City in the New York Metropolitan area, as defined by the United States Census Bureau, but directly borders the Philadelphia metropolitan area and is part of the Federal Communications Commission's Philadelphia Designated Market Area. Since East Windsor is situated at the confluence of several major highways that serve both the major cities of New York City and Philadelphia, and even the local commercial hubs of nearby Freehold, Princeton, and the state capital of Trenton, the community has been a longtime residential, commercial, and industrial hub in the heart of Central Jersey.

As of the 2020 United States census, East Windsor's population was 30,045, its highest decennial count ever and an increase of 2,855 (+10.5%) from the 27,190 recorded at the 2010 census, which in turn reflected an increase of 2,271 (+9.1%) from the 24,919 counted in the 2000 census.

Both East Windsor and West Windsor were formed when Windsor Township was split on February 9, 1797, while the area was still part of Middlesex County. It was incorporated by an act of the New Jersey Legislature on February 21, 1798, as one of New Jersey's initial group of 104 townships. Portions of the township were taken to form Hightstown borough (March 5, 1853, within East Windsor; became independent c. 1894) and Washington Township (March 11, 1860, and known as Robbinsville Township since 2007).} The township was named for Windsor Township, which was named for Windsor, England.

== Geography ==
According to the United States Census Bureau, the township had a total area of 15.66 square miles (40.55 km^{2}), including 15.57 square miles (40.32 km^{2}) of land and 0.09 square miles (0.23 km^{2}) of water (0.57%).

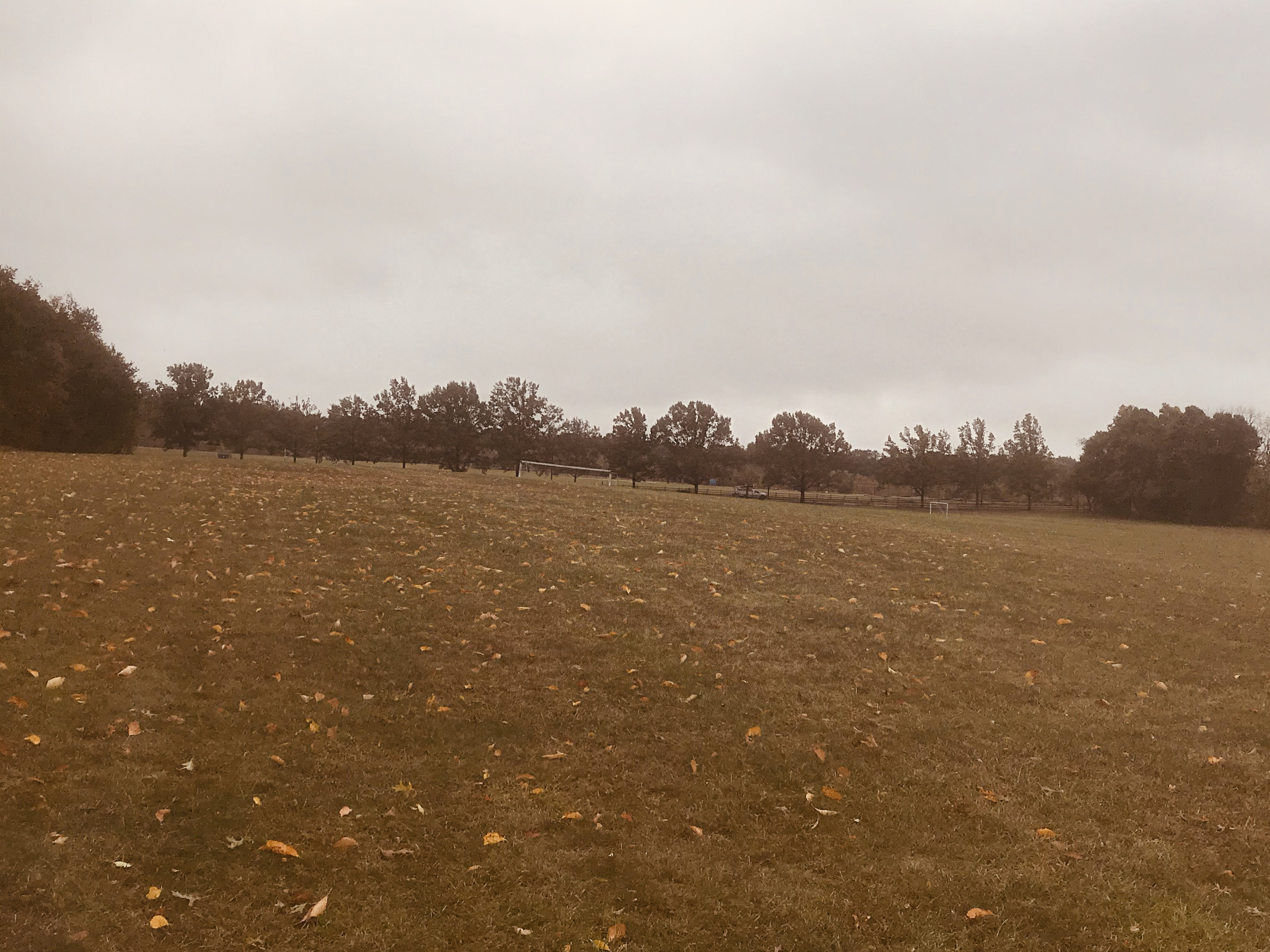
Rolling fields in East Windsor

Twin Rivers (2020 Census population of 7,878) is an unincorporated community and census-designated place (CDP) located within East Windsor Township. According to "New Jersey: A Guide to the State" by Barbara Westergaard, Twin Rivers was "New Jersey's first planned unit development" and "has attracted the scrutiny of countless researchers, from sociologists and anthropologists to specialists in energy conservation." Other unincorporated communities, localities and place names located completely or partially within East Windsor include Allens Station, Eilers Corner, Etra, Hickory Corner, Locust Corner, Millstone and Washington Oak.

The township borders Robbinsville Township and West Windsor Township in Mercer County; Cranbury Township, Monroe Township and Plainsboro Township in Middlesex County; and both Millstone Township and Upper Freehold Township in Monmouth County. East Windsor completely surrounds the independent borough of Hightstown, making it part one of 21 pairs of "doughnut towns" in the state, where one municipality entirely surrounds another.

The Meadow Lakes continuing care retirement community occupies a 100-acre (40 ha) site that straddles the East Windsor-Hightstown boundary line.

== Demographics ==
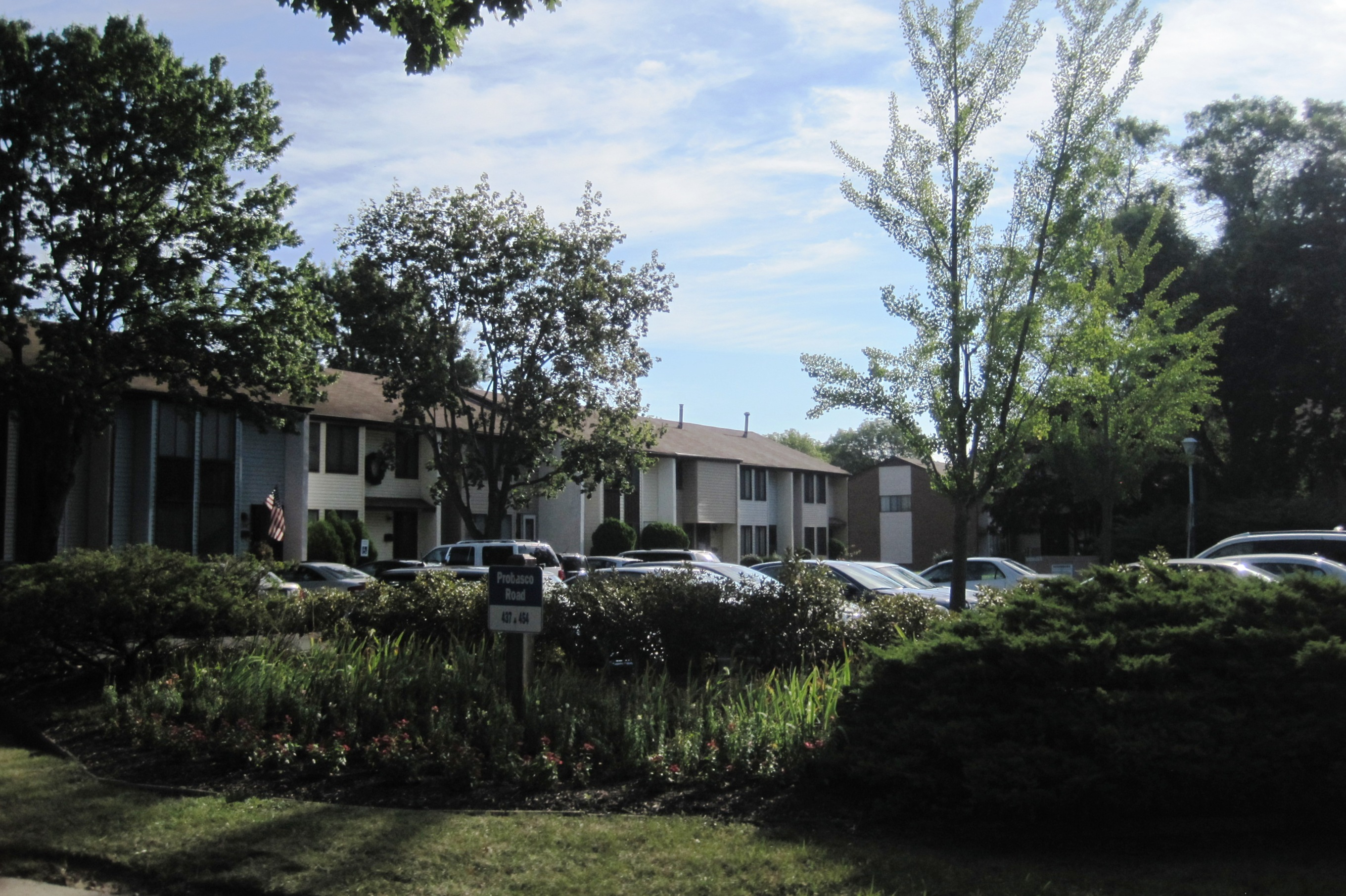
The Twin Rivers neighborhood in East Windsor

Historical population
Census	Pop.	Note	%±
1810	1,747		—
1820	1,710		−2.1%
1830	1,903		11.3%
1840	1,989		4.5%
1850	2,596		30.5%
1860	943	*	−63.7%
1870	1,036		9.9%
1880	916		−11.6%
1890	881		−3.8%
1900	894		1.5%
1910	941		5.3%
1920	733		−22.1%
1930	922		25.8%
1940	845		−8.4%
1950	1,284		52.0%
1960	2,298		79.0%
1970	11,736		410.7%
1980	21,041		79.3%
1990	22,353		6.2%
2000	24,919		11.5%
2010	27,190		9.1%
2020	30,045		10.5%
2023 (est.)	29,758		−1.0%
Population sources: 1810–1920 1840 1850–1870; 1850 1870 1880–1890; 1890–1910 1910–1930; 1940–2000 2000; 2010 2020

=== 2010 census ===
The 2010 United States census counted 27,190 people, 10,224 households, and 7,167 families in the township. The population density was 1,737.6 per square mile (670.9/km^{2}). There were 10,851 housing units at an average density of 693.4 per square mile (267.7/km^{2}). The racial makeup was 62.08% (16,880) White, 8.62% (2,343) Black or African American, 0.53% (145) Native American, 17.66% (4,802) Asian, 0.06% (16) Pacific Islander, 8.31% (2,260) from other races, and 2.74% (744) from two or more races. Hispanic or Latino of any race were 19.64% (5,340) of the population.

Of the 10,224 households, 34.7% had children under the age of 18; 56.3% were married couples living together; 10.1% had a female householder with no husband present and 29.9% were non-families. Of all households, 25.0% were made up of individuals and 9.5% had someone living alone who was 65 years of age or older. The average household size was 2.65 and the average family size was 3.18.

24.2% of the population were under the age of 18, 6.7% from 18 to 24, 30.7% from 25 to 44, 26.8% from 45 to 64, and 11.6% who were 65 years of age or older. The median age was 38.2 years. For every 100 females, the population had 95.2 males. For every 100 females ages 18 and older there were 92.1 males.

The Census Bureau's 2006–2010 American Community Survey showed that (in 2010 inflation-adjusted dollars) median household income was $84,503 (with a margin of error of +/− $4,345) and the median family income was $100,411 (+/− $4,485). Males had a median income of $70,057 (+/− $6,291) versus $44,089 (+/− $2,948) for females. The per capita income for the borough was $37,876 (+/− $1,490). About 3.0% of families and 5.0% of the population were below the poverty line, including 4.2% of those under age 18 and 5.4% of those age 65 or over.

=== 2000 census ===
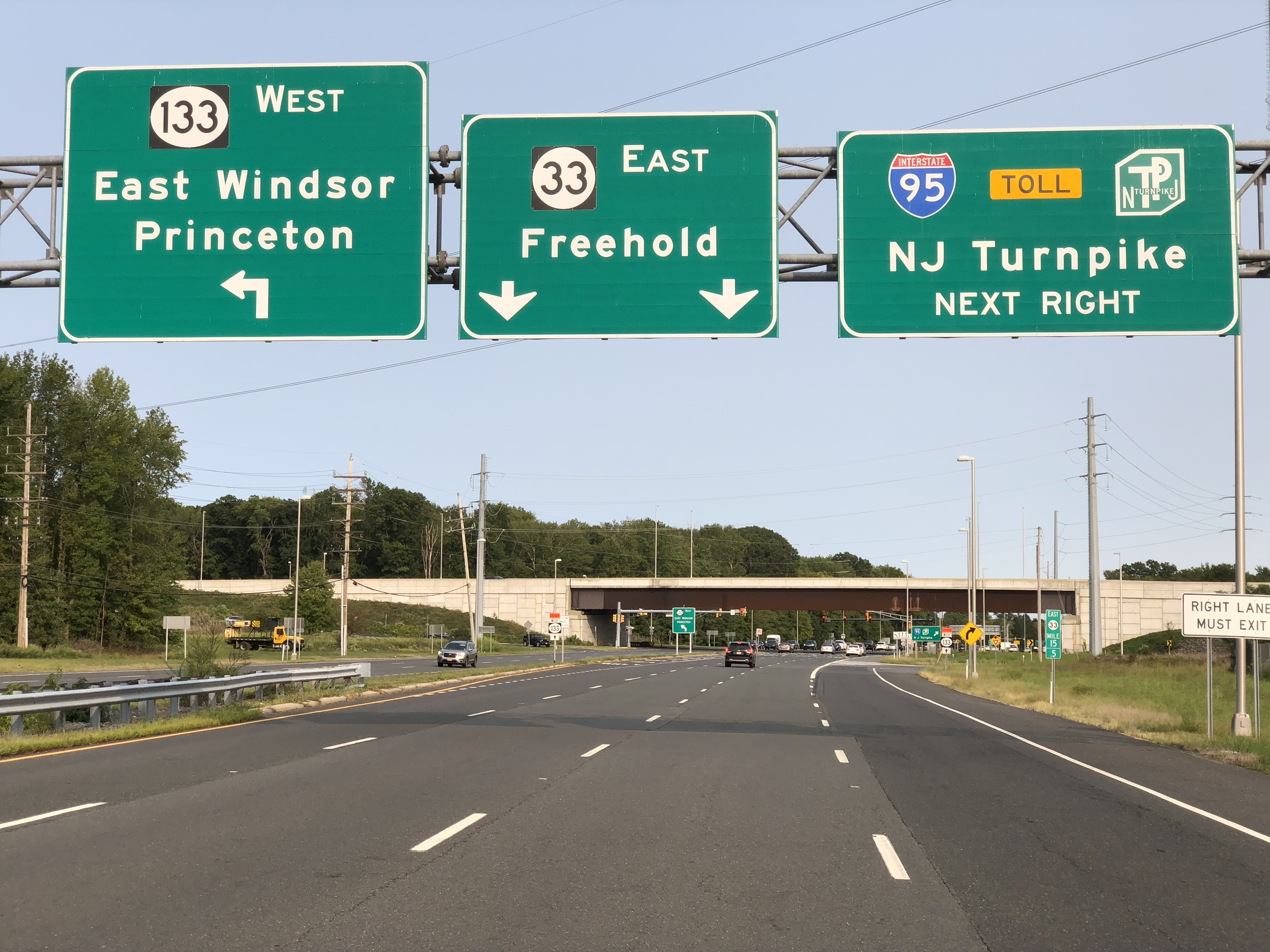
Situated at the confluence of several highways, East Windsor is a growing residential, commercial, and industrial hub midway between New York City and Philadelphia.

As of the 2000 United States census there were 24,919 people, 9,448 households, and 6,556 families residing in the township. The population density was 1,592.8 inhabitants per square mile (615.0/km^{2}). There were 9,880 housing units at an average density of 631.5 per square mile (243.8/km^{2}). The racial makeup of the township was 74.42% White, 8.90% African American, 0.20% Native American, 9.55% Asian, 0.12% Pacific Islander, 4.61% from other races, and 2.20% from two or more races. Hispanic or Latino of any race were 14.28% of the population.

There were 9,448 households, out of which 34.2% had children under the age of 18 living with them, 55.6% were married couples living together, 9.6% had a female householder with no husband present, and 30.6% were non-families. 24.6% of all households were made up of individuals, and 6.6% had someone living alone who was 65 years of age or older. The average household size was 2.61 and the average family size was 3.12.

The population of the township was spread out, with 24.0% under the age of 18, 7.6% from 18 to 24, 35.2% from 25 to 44, 24.9% from 45 to 64, and 8.3% who were 65 years of age or older. The median age was 36 years. For every 100 females, there were 95.2 males. For every 100 females age 18 and over, there were 91.6 males.

The median income for a household in the township was $63,616, and the median income for a family was $73,461. Males had a median income of $50,875 versus $35,260 for females. The per capita income for the township was $28,695. About 2.8% of families and 5.3% of the population were below the poverty line, including 4.3% of those under age 18 and 8.1% of those age 65 or over.

== Economy ==
Pharmaceutical firms located in East Windsor include Hovione, CoreTech, Aprecia, Sabinsa, Novotec, Aurobindo and Windsor Labs.

For shopping, numerous businesses are dotted along U.S. Route 130 in the township. Neighboring Hightstown's Downtown has restaurants, boutiques, art galleries and historical sites. Downtown Hightstown, Inc., established in 2008, is an organization of businesses owners and stakeholders in the community of Hightstown, dedicated to promoting the "unique ability to be a town big enough to provide a diverse offering of business services while being small enough to offer excellent personal service to residents, visitors and customers."

Area shopping malls include Freehold Raceway Mall in Freehold Township, Quaker Bridge Mall in Lawrence Township, and Princeton Market Fair in Princeton, are a short distance away.

== Government ==
=== Local government ===
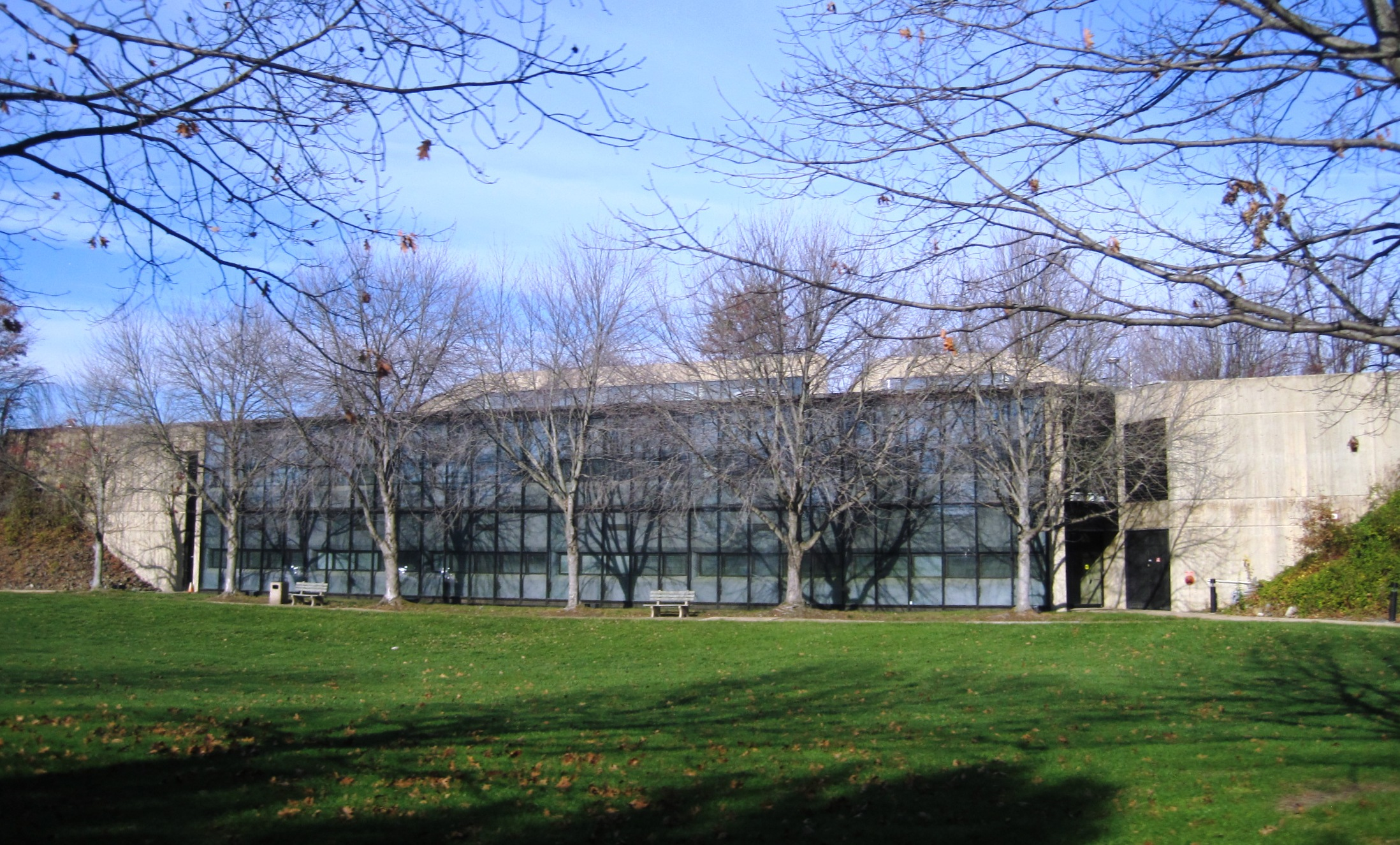
East Windsor Municipal Building, built in 1982 using earth sheltering to reduce energy costs

East Windsor has been governed since 1970 within the Faulkner Act, formally known as the Optional Municipal Charter Law, under the Council-Manager form of government. The township is one of 42 municipalities (of the 564) statewide that use this form of government. The council is comprised of seven members elected at-large for four-year terms of office on a staggered basis, with either three or four seats up for vote in odd-numbered years as part of the November general election. In a reorganization meeting held each January, the council selects a mayor and a deputy mayor from among its members for a one-year term.

As of 2023, members of the East Windsor Council are Mayor Janice S. Mironov (D, term on council ends December 31, 2027; term as mayor ends 2025), Deputy Mayor David Russell (D, term on council and as deputy mayor ends 2025), Denise Daniels (D, 2025), Simon Sharkey (D, 2027), Marc Lippman (D, 2027), Johnnie Whittington (D, 2025; elected to serve an unexpired term) and John Zoller (D, 2027).

Johnnie Whittington was appointed to fill a seat expiring in December 2025 that became vacant following the death of Alan Rosenberg and served on an interim basis until the November 2023 election when he was chosen by voters to serve the balance of the term of office.

In December 2015, the Township Council appointed Denise Daniels to fill the seat expiring in December 2017 that became vacant following the death of Hector Duke earlier that month.

Designed during the 1970s energy crisis and constructed in 1982, the township's municipal building was erected within a landscaped man-made hill, with only its south side exposed. The design allows the building to maintain a comfortable climate inside for most of the year, with greatly reduced energy needs. The passive solar design allows the building to reduce energy consumption by 60% compared to conventional office buildings of the same size.

==== Cyber breach ====
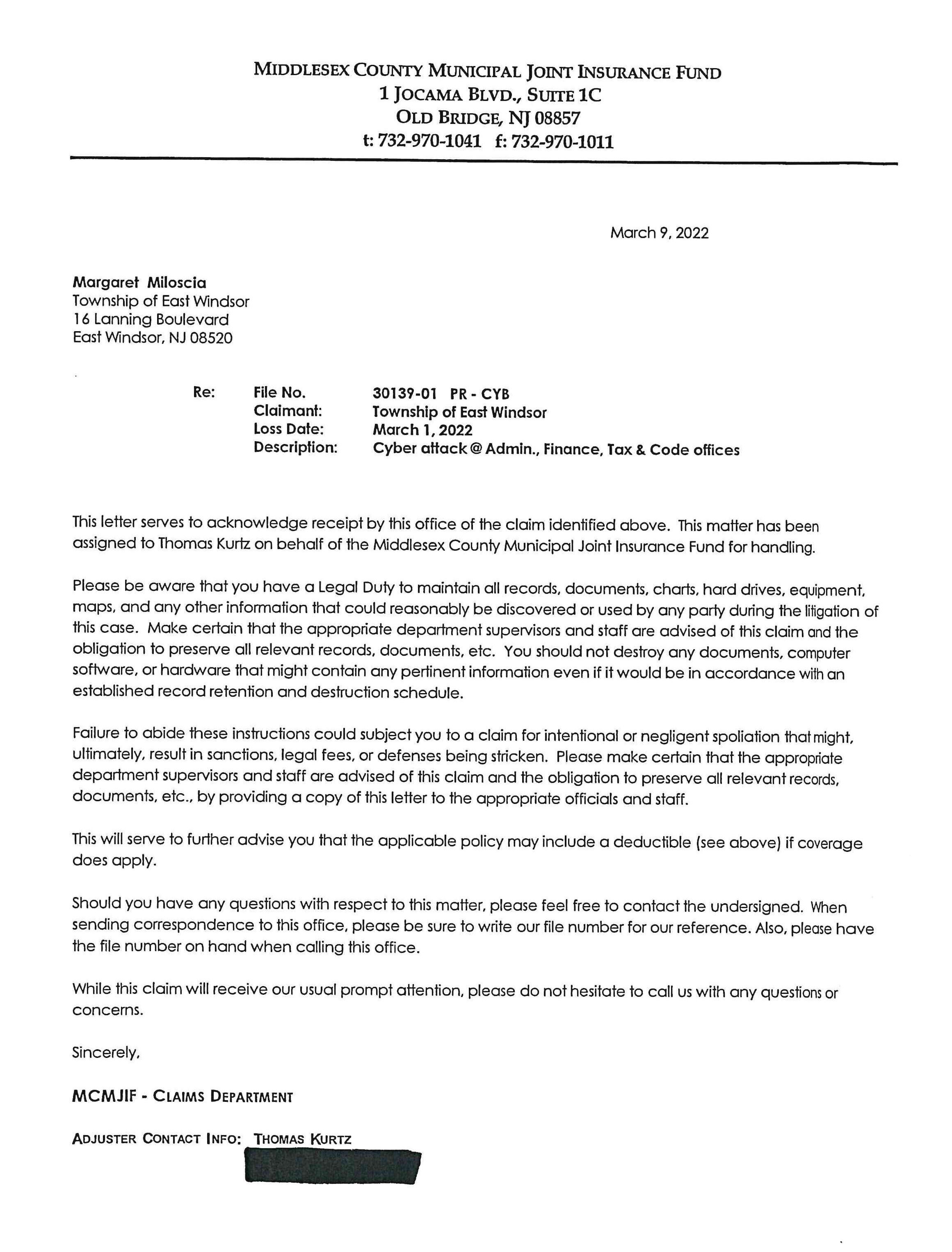
Form filed by East Windsor Township which conflicts with the timeline provided to residents and State and Federal officials.

On February 24, 2022, the computer servers of the East Windsor Municipal Offices were breached. Numerous residents contacted the Township to report the issue, which went unacknowledged for nearly two weeks. East Windsor officials said they first became aware of a municipal cyber breach on March 7, but a letter confirming receipt of an insurance claim contains a loss date from six days earlier. The Windsor-Hights Herald contacted Mayor Mironov by email March 7 and March 14 for comment and explanation, but she did not respond. By March 17, the Township was still attempting to restore operations. Several residents who were professional IT managers and cybersecurity experts offered to assist for free, but were never contacted back by the township. Two months after the initial incident, Township officials had not divulged who was behind the hack or any of the steps taken to prevent future incidents. On May 9, a local cybersecurity expert filed a 13-item Open Public Records Act request with the Township, including requests for "All documentation as to the scope and nature of the incident that is currently known” and “all documentation as to what personal records were released”. Those records were received on May 19 by the resident and the Windsor-Hights Herald. The records contradicted the timeline provided by the Township. The incident received national and international coverage, as it was reported nationally by MSN. It was reported on NJ.com on May 10 that while the Township had claimed to first be aware of the breach on March 7, the Township had actually submitted an insurance claim six days earlier. On May 26, it was reported that unauthorized access to the system also allowed access to certain data relating to individuals associated with the township. It was reported on May 31, 2022, that Township Manager Jim Brady received an email March 2 from a cyber threat intelligence analyst from the New Jersey Cybersecurity and Communications Integration Cell, which stated that the agency's email security tool had picked up a few emails that used a display name to spoof—or impersonate—East Windsor Township email users. Brady replied March 3 to the cyber threat intelligence analyst, and wrote that the Township was aware of the issue despite the later claim that the Township was not yet aware of the incident It was also reported that over 900 people have had their personal information compromised—potentially including their birth date, driver's license and social security number—following the cyber breach.

==== Emergency services ====
East Windsor is served by East Windsor Rescue Squad District I (Squad 142) and Rescue Squad District II (Squad 146). Fire protection is provided by East Windsor Volunteer Fire Department 1 (Station 42) and Volunteer Fire Department 2 (Station 46). The Township is split for faster response times, with Rescue Squad District II and Fire Department 2 serving Twin Rivers and the eastern portion of the Township.

The East Windsor Police Department, located on One Mile Road, is led by Chief James A. Geary, and employs 30 uniformed patrol and Traffic Enforcement Officers, 5 Detectives, 7 Dispatchers and Communications Officers and two Animal Control Officers, for a total of 43 sworn officers.

=== Federal, state, and county representation ===
East Windsor is located in the 3rd Congressional District and is part of New Jersey's 14th state legislative district.

Prior to the 2011 reapportionment following the 2010 census, East Windsor had been in the 12th state legislative district. Prior to the 2010 Census, East Windsor had been part of the 4th Congressional District, a change made by the New Jersey Redistricting Commission that took effect in January 2013, based on the results of the November 2012 general elections.

For the 119th United States Congress, New Jersey's 3rd congressional district is currently represented Herb Conaway (D, Delran Township). New Jersey is represented in the United States Senate by Democrats Cory Booker (Newark, term ends 2027) and Andy Kim (Moorestown, term ends 2031).

For the 2026–2027 session, the 14th legislative district of the New Jersey Legislature is represented in the State Senate by Linda R. Greenstein (D, Plainsboro Township) and in the General Assembly by Wayne DeAngelo (D, Hamilton Township) and Tennille McCoy (D, Hamilton Township).

Mercer County is governed by a County Executive who oversees the day-to-day operations of the county and by a seven-member Board of County Commissioners that acts in a legislative capacity, setting policy. All officials are chosen at-large in partisan elections, with the executive serving a four-year term of office while the commissioners serve three-year terms of office on a staggered basis, with either two or three seats up for election each year as part of the November general election. As of 2025, the County Executive is Daniel R. Benson (D, Hamilton Township) whose term of office ends December 31, 2027. Mercer County's Commissioners are:

Lucylle R. S. Walter (D, Ewing Township, 2026), Chair John A. Cimino (D, Hamilton Township, 2026), Samuel T. Frisby Sr. (D, Trenton, 2027), Cathleen M. Lewis (D, Lawrence Township, 2025), Vice Chair Kristin L. McLaughlin (D, Hopewell Township, 2027), Nina D. Melker (D, Hamilton Township, 2025) and Terrance Stokes (D, Ewing Township, 2027).

Mercer County's constitutional officers are: Clerk Paula Sollami-Covello (D, Lawrence Township, 2025), Sheriff John A. Kemler (D, Hamilton Township, 2026) and Surrogate Diane Gerofsky (D, Lawrence Township, 2026).

=== Politics ===
As of March 2011, there were a total of 14,729 registered voters in East Windsor, of which 5,194 (35.3%) were registered as Democrats, 2,120 (14.4%) were registered as Republicans and 7,396 (50.2%) were registered as Unaffiliated. There were 19 voters registered as Libertarians or Greens.

United States presidential election results for East Windsor
Year	Republican		Democratic		Third party(ies)	
Year	No.	%	No.	%	No.	%
2024	4,647	36.07%	7,929	61.54%	309	2.40%
2020	4,186	29.52%	9,775	68.94%	219	1.54%
2016	3,609	30.55%	7,779	65.86%	424	3.59%
2012	3,548	32.71%	7,156	65.97%	143	1.32%
2008	3,624	31.74%	7,659	67.07%	136	1.19%
2004	3,923	38.48%	6,180	60.61%	93	0.91%

In the 2012 presidential election, Democrat Barack Obama received 66.0% of the vote (7,156 cast), ahead of Republican Mitt Romney with 32.7% (3,548 votes) and other candidates with 1.3% (143 votes), among the 11,821 ballots cast by the township's 15,852 registered voters (974 ballots were spoiled), for a turnout of 74.6%. In the 2008 presidential election, Democrat Barack Obama received 66.5% of the vote (7,659 cast), ahead of Republican John McCain with 31.4% (3,624 votes) and other candidates with 1.2% (136 votes), among the 11,524 ballots cast by the township's 15,401 registered voters, for a turnout of 74.8%.

Gubernatorial election results for East Windsor
Year	Republican		Democratic		Third party(ies)	
Year	No.	%	No.	%	No.	%
2025	2,703	27.64%	7,027	71.87%	48	0.49%
2021	2,548	33.99%	4,879	65.09%	69	0.92%
2017	2,321	35.68%	4,050	62.26%	134	2.06%
2013	3,736	58.45%	2,537	39.69%	119	1.86%
2009	3,319	45.79%	3,439	47.45%	490	6.76%
2005	2,602	39.15%	3,722	56.00%	323	4.86%

In the 2013 gubernatorial election, Republican Chris Christie received 58.4% of the vote (3,736 cast), ahead of Democrat Barbara Buono with 39.7% (2,537 votes) and other candidates with 1.9% (119 votes), among the 6,536 ballots cast by the township's 15,663 registered voters (144 ballots were spoiled), for a turnout of 41.7%. In the 2009 gubernatorial election, Democrat Jon Corzine received 47.2% of the vote (3,439 ballots cast), ahead of Republican Chris Christie with 45.5% (3,319 votes), Independent Chris Daggett with 5.6% (411 votes) and other candidates with 1.1% (79 votes), among the 7,288 ballots cast by the township's 14,999 registered voters, yielding a 48.6% turnout.

United States Senate election results for East Windsor1
Year	Republican		Democratic		Third party(ies)	
Year	No.	%	No.	%	No.	%
2024	3,996	32.46%	7,976	64.79%	338	2.75%
2018	2,735	33.24%	5,211	63.33%	282	3.43%
2012	3,276	31.78%	6,799	65.95%	234	2.27%
2006	2,243	35.40%	3,925	61.94%	169	2.67%

United States Senate election results for East Windsor2
Year	Republican		Democratic		Third party(ies)	
Year	No.	%	No.	%	No.	%
2020	4,306	31.16%	9,331	67.51%	184	1.33%
2014	1,825	34.85%	3,301	63.03%	111	2.12%
2013	1,443	34.60%	2,644	63.41%	83	1.99%
2008	3,794	35.89%	6,542	61.89%	235	2.22%

== Education ==
Students in public school for pre-kindergarten through twelfth grade attend the East Windsor Regional School District, which serves students from East Windsor and Hightstown. As of the 2022–23 school year, the district, comprised of six schools, had an enrollment of 5,138 students and 450.0 classroom teachers (on an FTE basis), for a student–teacher ratio of 11.4:1. Public school students in seventh through twelfth grades from Roosevelt Borough (a community in Monmouth County) are sent to the district's schools as part of a sending/receiving relationship with the Roosevelt Public School District. The seats on the nine-member board of education are allocated based on the population of the constituent municipalities, with seven seats assigned to East Windsor.

Schools in the district (with 2022–23 enrollment data from the National Center for Education Statistics) are Walter C. Black Elementary School with 480 students in grades K-2, Ethel McKnight Elementary School with 589 students in grades K-2, Perry L. Drew Elementary School with 579 students in grades 3-5, Grace N. Rogers Elementary School with 611 students in grades PreK / 3-5, Melvin H. Kreps Middle School with 1,176 students in grades 6-8 and Hightstown High School with 1,644 students in grades 9-12.

Eighth grade students from all of Mercer County are eligible to apply to attend the high school programs offered by the Mercer County Technical Schools, a county-wide vocational school district that offers full-time career and technical education at its Health Sciences Academy, STEM Academy and Academy of Culinary Arts, with no tuition charged to students for attendance.

== Infrastructure ==
=== Transportation ===
==== Roads and highways ====
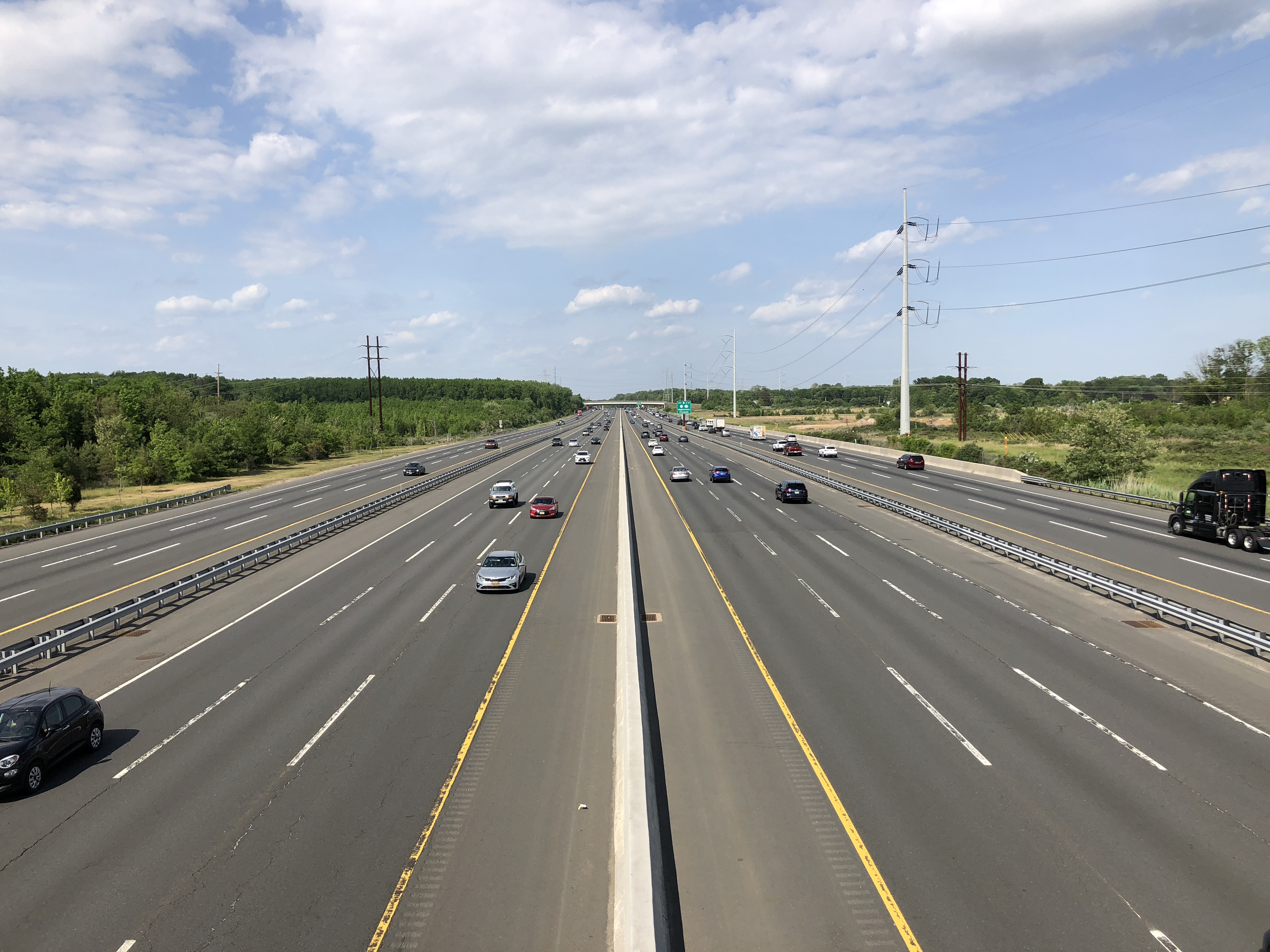
The New Jersey Turnpike (Interstate 95) is the busiest highway in East Windsor.

As of May 2010, the township had a total of 93.45 miles (150.39 km) of roadways, of which 68.99 miles (111.03 km) were maintained by the municipality, 10.71 miles (17.24 km) by Mercer County, 9.80 miles (15.77 km) by the New Jersey Department of Transportation and 3.95 miles (6.36 km) by the New Jersey Turnpike Authority.

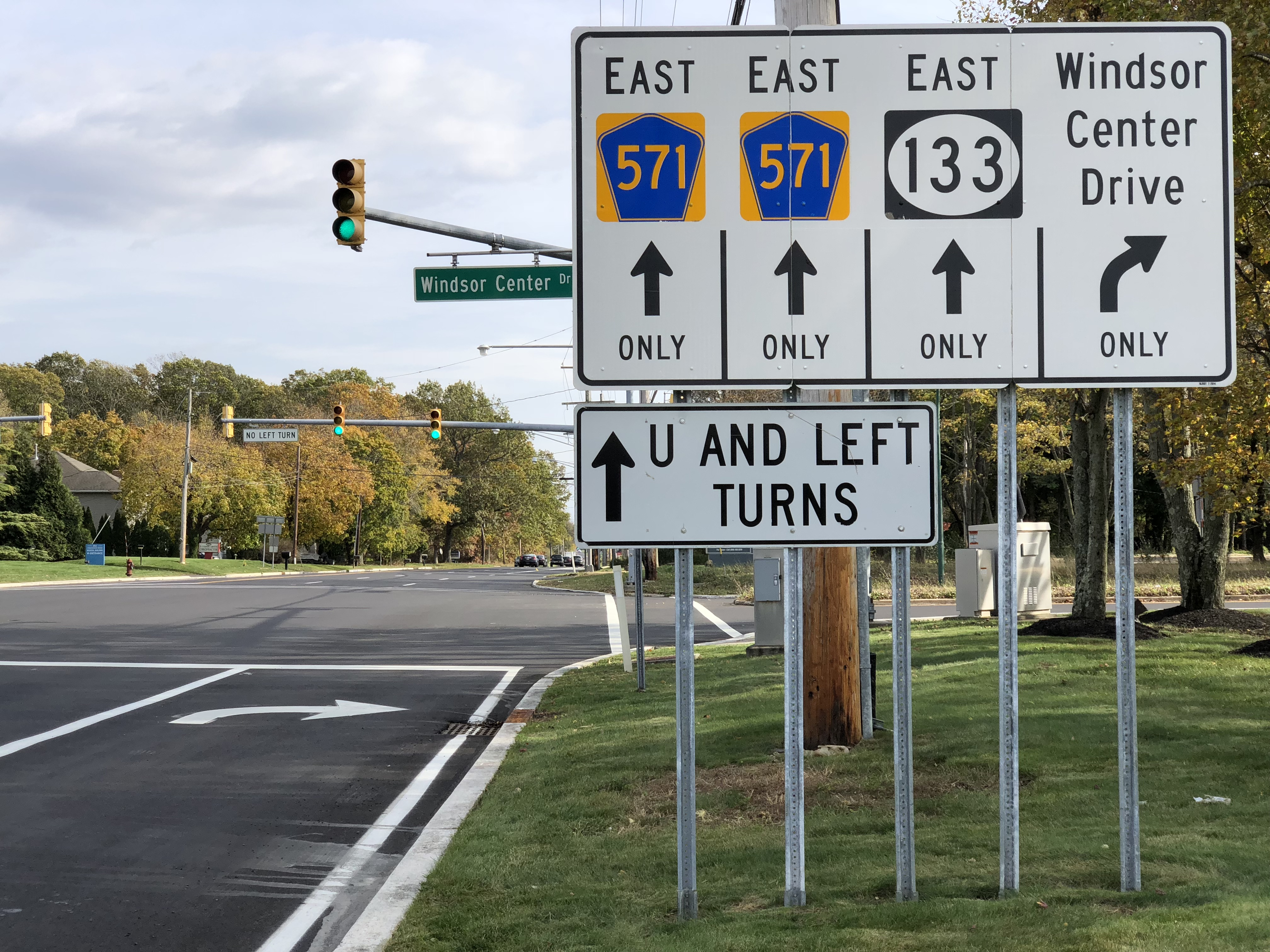
The junction of Route 133 and County Route 571 in East Windsor Township

Several major highways serve East Windsor. The most prominent among them is the New Jersey Turnpike (Interstate 95). One exit, Exit 8, is located within East Windsor, connecting the turnpike to Route 33 and Route 133 ("Hightstown Bypass"). Route 33 runs east to west across the southern and eastern portions of the township while Route 133 forms a bypass of Hightstown, connecting Route 33 on the east side of East Windsor to County Route 571 on the west side. U.S. Route 130 crosses the western portions of East Windsor with a north–south orientation parallel to the turnpike, forming a concurrency with Route 33 in the southern portion of the township. The township is also served by County Route 535 and County Route 539.

==== Public transportation ====
Suburban Transit offers commuter service to and from the Port Authority Bus Terminal in Midtown Manhattan on the 300 Route and to and from Wall Street in Downtown Manhattan on the 600 Route.

The nearest NJ Transit rail service is available at the Princeton Junction station. Shuttle bus service to the Princeton Junction station is available during rush hour.

Mercer County offers a shuttle service providing access to major businesses and transportation hubs in the area along Route 130 as well as a local shuttle within the area.

=== Healthcare ===
East Windsor is served by several nearby hospitals, offering residents a range of healthcare options. The closest hospital to the township is Penn Medicine Princeton Medical Center, located approximately 7 miles away in Plainsboro Township. This modern facility offers comprehensive inpatient and outpatient services and serves as a primary healthcare provider for the region.

The Hamilton Division of Robert Wood Johnson University Hospital, situated in Hamilton Township, is another major hospital serving the area, located about 10 miles southwest of East Windsor.

Finally, CentraState Healthcare System a 287-bed regional facility affiliated with Rutgers Robert Wood Johnson Medical School — is located further away in Freehold Township, roughly 17 miles to the southeast.

Additionally, East Windsor is served by multiple local family practices and urgent care clinics, which provide convenient access to primary care and immediate medical services within the community.

== Climate ==
According to the Köppen climate classification system, East Windsor Township has a Hot-summer Humid continental climate (Dfa).

Climate data for East Windsor Twp (40.2565, -74.5059), 1991-2020 normals, extremes 1981-2024
Month	Jan	Feb	Mar	Apr	May	Jun	Jul	Aug	Sep	Oct	Nov	Dec	Year
Record high °F (°C)	71.8 (22.1)	77.8 (25.4)	87.6 (30.9)	94.6 (34.8)	95.2 (35.1)	97.3 (36.3)	102.2 (39.0)	101.2 (38.4)	97.4 (36.3)	93.4 (34.1)	80.9 (27.2)	75.6 (24.2)	102.2 (39.0)
Mean daily maximum °F (°C)	40.5 (4.7)	43.0 (6.1)	50.5 (10.3)	62.8 (17.1)	72.5 (22.5)	81.6 (27.6)	86.3 (30.2)	84.5 (29.2)	78.1 (25.6)	66.2 (19.0)	55.5 (13.1)	45.6 (7.6)	64.0 (17.8)
Daily mean °F (°C)	31.9 (−0.1)	33.9 (1.1)	41.1 (5.1)	52.0 (11.1)	61.7 (16.5)	70.8 (21.6)	75.9 (24.4)	74.1 (23.4)	67.4 (19.7)	55.5 (13.1)	45.4 (7.4)	37.0 (2.8)	54.0 (12.2)
Mean daily minimum °F (°C)	23.3 (−4.8)	24.7 (−4.1)	31.6 (−0.2)	41.3 (5.2)	50.9 (10.5)	60.1 (15.6)	65.5 (18.6)	63.6 (17.6)	56.7 (13.7)	44.9 (7.2)	35.3 (1.8)	28.4 (−2.0)	44.0 (6.7)
Record low °F (°C)	−11.2 (−24.0)	−4.9 (−20.5)	4.5 (−15.3)	17.8 (−7.9)	31.4 (−0.3)	40.1 (4.5)	46.4 (8.0)	41.1 (5.1)	35.0 (1.7)	24.1 (−4.4)	9.9 (−12.3)	0.2 (−17.7)	−11.2 (−24.0)
Average precipitation inches (mm)	3.51 (89)	2.71 (69)	4.26 (108)	3.71 (94)	4.02 (102)	4.53 (115)	4.86 (123)	4.41 (112)	4.11 (104)	3.88 (99)	3.29 (84)	4.29 (109)	47.57 (1,208)
Average snowfall inches (cm)	8.0 (20)	9.0 (23)	4.2 (11)	0.1 (0.25)	0.0 (0.0)	0.0 (0.0)	0.0 (0.0)	0.0 (0.0)	0.0 (0.0)	0.2 (0.51)	0.7 (1.8)	4.0 (10)	26.2 (67)
Average dew point °F (°C)	21.6 (−5.8)	22.4 (−5.3)	27.8 (−2.3)	37.3 (2.9)	49.2 (9.6)	59.5 (15.3)	64.4 (18.0)	63.7 (17.6)	57.9 (14.4)	46.3 (7.9)	35.1 (1.7)	27.5 (−2.5)	42.8 (6.0)
Source 1: PRISM
Source 2: NOHRSC (Snow, 2008/2009 - 2024/2025 normals)

== Ecology ==
According to the A. W. Kuchler U.S. potential natural vegetation types, most of East Windsor Township would have a dominant vegetation type of Appalachian Oak (104) with a dominant vegetation form of Eastern Hardwood Forest (25). On the east and northeast side of Hightstown, a Northeastern Oak/Pine ("110") vegetation type and Southern Mixed Forest ("26") vegetation form would prevail.

== Notable people ==
People who were born in, residents of, or otherwise closely associated with East Windsor Township include:

- Clara Barton (1821–1912), founder of the American Red Cross, taught at the Cedarville Road School in East Windsor 1851–1852
- Rich Gunnell (born 1987), college football coach
- Guy Hutchinson (born 1974), author, broadcaster, theme park historian and comedian
- Lisa P. Jackson (born 1962), Administrator of the Environmental Protection Agency (EPA)
- Marlon LeBlanc (born 1976), head coach for the West Virginia Mountaineers men's soccer team
- Loretta Long (born 1938), actress, voice artist, singer, media personality and educator who played the character of Susan Robinson on Sesame Street, from its debut in 1969 until 2015
- Zubin Mehenti, sportscaster and radio host who joined ESPN in 2011 and has served as the anchor for several variations of the channel's flagship program, SportsCenter
- Taylor Ortega (born 1988 or 1989), actress and comedian who has starred in the series Welcome to Flatch and Big Mistakes
- Tony Paige (born 1953), radio talk show host on WFAN
- Randal Pinkett (born 1971), business consultant who was the winner of The Apprentice season 4
- Al Rosenberg, comedy writer for Imus in the Morning and The Howard Stern Show, who has served as a councilman since 2002
- Carl Emil Schorske (1915–2015), cultural historian who won the Pulitzer Prize for General Nonfiction in 1981
- Anton Strout (born 1970), urban fantasy novelist
- Jimmy Takter (born 1960), harness racing horse trainer who was inducted into the Harness Racing Hall of Fame in 2012
- Nick Williams (born 1990), wide receiver who has played in the NFL for the Washington Commanders and Atlanta Falcons
