= Judge Page =

Judge Page may refer to:

- Ambrose Page (1723–1791), Rhode Island admiralty judge who declined appointment as an associate justice of the Rhode Island Supreme Court
- Carroll S. Page (1843–1925), Vermont county probate judge
- Francis Page (judge) (1661–1741), English judge of the Court of Common Pleas and of the King's Bench

== See also ==
- Justice Page (disambiguation)
