= James Page =

James or Jim Page may refer to:

- James Page (American politician) (1795–1875), American attorney, military officer, and government official from Philadelphia
- James Page (Australian educationist) (born 1953)
- James Page (boxer) (born 1971), American boxer
- James H. Page, Chancellor of the University of Maine system
- James O. Page (1936–2004), American authority on emergency medical services
- James Page (rower) (1900–1977), British rower
- James Page (minister) (1808–1883), African-American minister
- James Morris Page (1864–1936), American mathematician
- James Page, Minneapolis attorney and founder of the James Page Brewing Company
- Jimmy Page (born 1944), English guitarist for Led Zeppelin
- Jimmy Page (footballer) (born 1964), Scottish footballer
- Jim Page (politician) (1861–1921), Australian politician
- Jim Page (singer) (born 1949), American singer-songwriter and social activist
- Jim Page (skier) (born 1941), American Olympic skier
- James Page, photographer partner of Walter B. Woodbury in Woodbury & Page
