= Jack Page (footballer, born 1893) =

English footballer

Personal information
- Full name: John Abraham Page
- Date of birth: 10 February 1893
- Place of birth: Sunderland, England
- Date of death: 1964 (aged 70–71)
- Position: Winger

Senior career*
Years	Team	Apps	(Gls)
1919	Sunderland West End		
1919–1920	Sunderland	3	(0)
1920–192?	Sunderland West End		
- * Club domestic league appearances and goals

John Abraham Page (10 February 1893 – 1964) was an English professional footballer who played as a winger for Sunderland.
