= Robert E. Page Jr. =

Honey bee geneticist (born 1949)

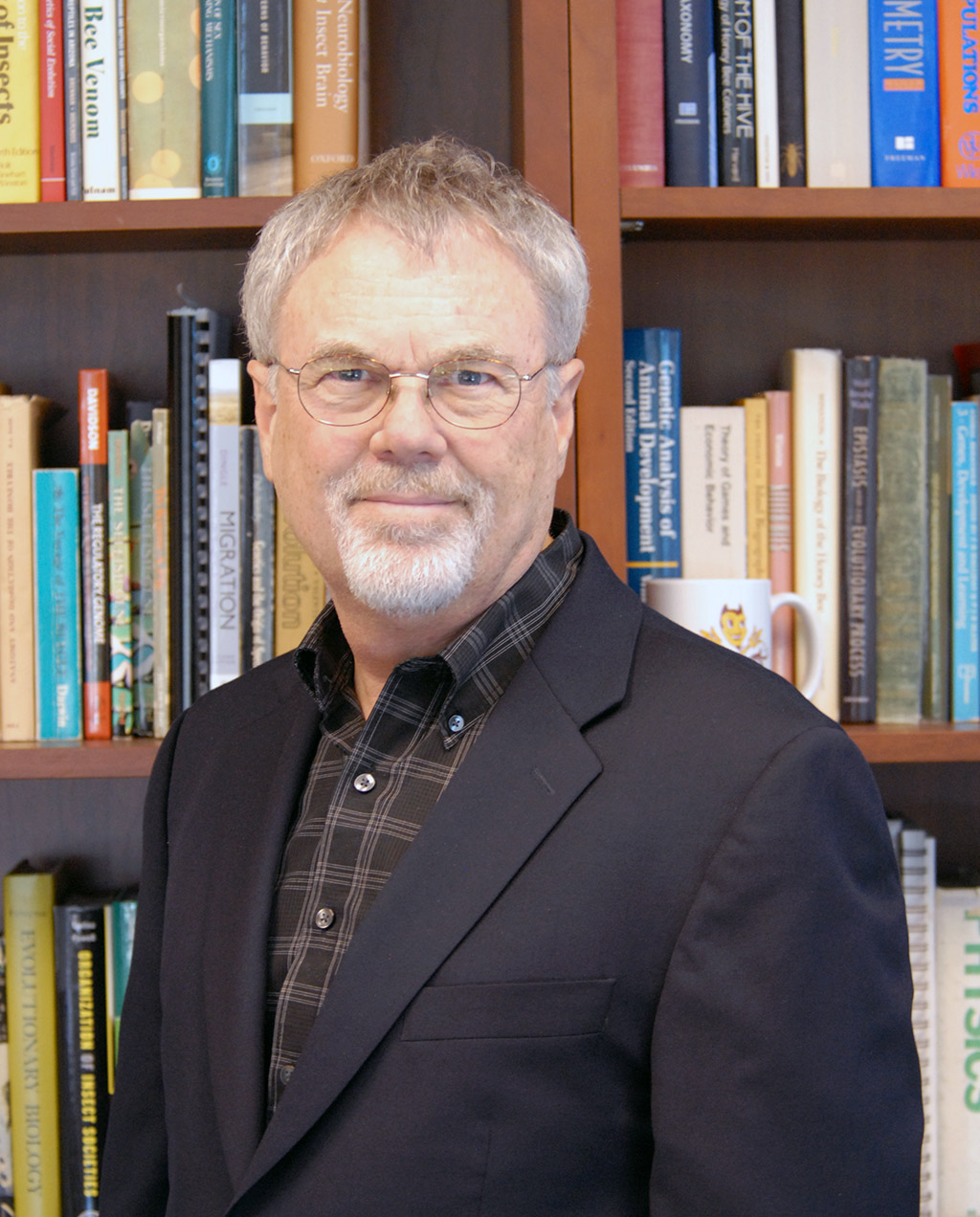
- Born: Robert E. Page Jr. 12 November 1949 (age 77); Bakersfield, California, U.S.
- Education: San Jose State University ( B.S.); University of California-Davis (Ph.D.)
- Scientific career
- Fields: Genetics
- Workplaces: Arizona State University, University of California-Davis and Ohio State University

Robert E. Page Jr. (born 12 November 1949) is one of the foremost honey bee geneticists in the world and a Foundation Chair of Life Sciences of Arizona State University. An author of more than 250 research papers and articles, his work on the self-organizing regulatory networks of honey bees has been outlined in his book, "The Spirit of the Hive: The Mechanisms of Social Evolution," published by Harvard University Press in 2013. Page currently holds the titles of Arizona State University Provost Emeritus and Regents Professor Emeritus. He is also chair and professor emeritus at the University of California-Davis and an external professor at the Santa Fe Institute.

== Biography and education ==
Page was born in Bakersfield, California, and spent his childhood there until he attended high school in Porterville, California. He served in the U.S. Army from 1969 to 1972. With support from the G.I. Bill, he received his undergraduate degree in entomology, with a minor in chemistry, from San Jose State University in 1976. He was awarded his Ph.D. in entomology from University of California-Davis in 1980. He began his career as an assistant professor in the Department of Entomology with Ohio State University in 1986, moving to the University of California-Davis in 1989, where he became chair for UC-Davis's Department of Entomology in 1999. He joined Arizona State University (ASU) in 2004 as founding director of ASU's School of Life Sciences, one of the first interdisciplinary academic units developed under President Michael Crow's vision of the "New American University." His background is in behavior and population genetics and the focus of his current research is on the evolution of complex social behavior. Using the honey bee as a model, Professor Page has dissected bee's complex foraging division of labor at all levels of biological organization – from gene networks to complex social interactions. An internationally recognized scholar, he has published more than 230 research papers and articles. In 2005, he was listed as an ISI's Highly Cited author in plant and animal science – representing the top ½ percent of publishing researchers.

He served as provost of Arizona State University (2013–2015), and vice provost and dean of the College of Liberal Arts and Sciences, the largest college in the university (2011–2013). During this period he forged a platform to accelerate ASU’s transdisciplinary collaboration in the U.S. and Europe, advance educational reform, and jumpstart cutting-edge "virtual" learning formats. He also established ASU's Honey Bee Research Facility.

== Scientific work ==
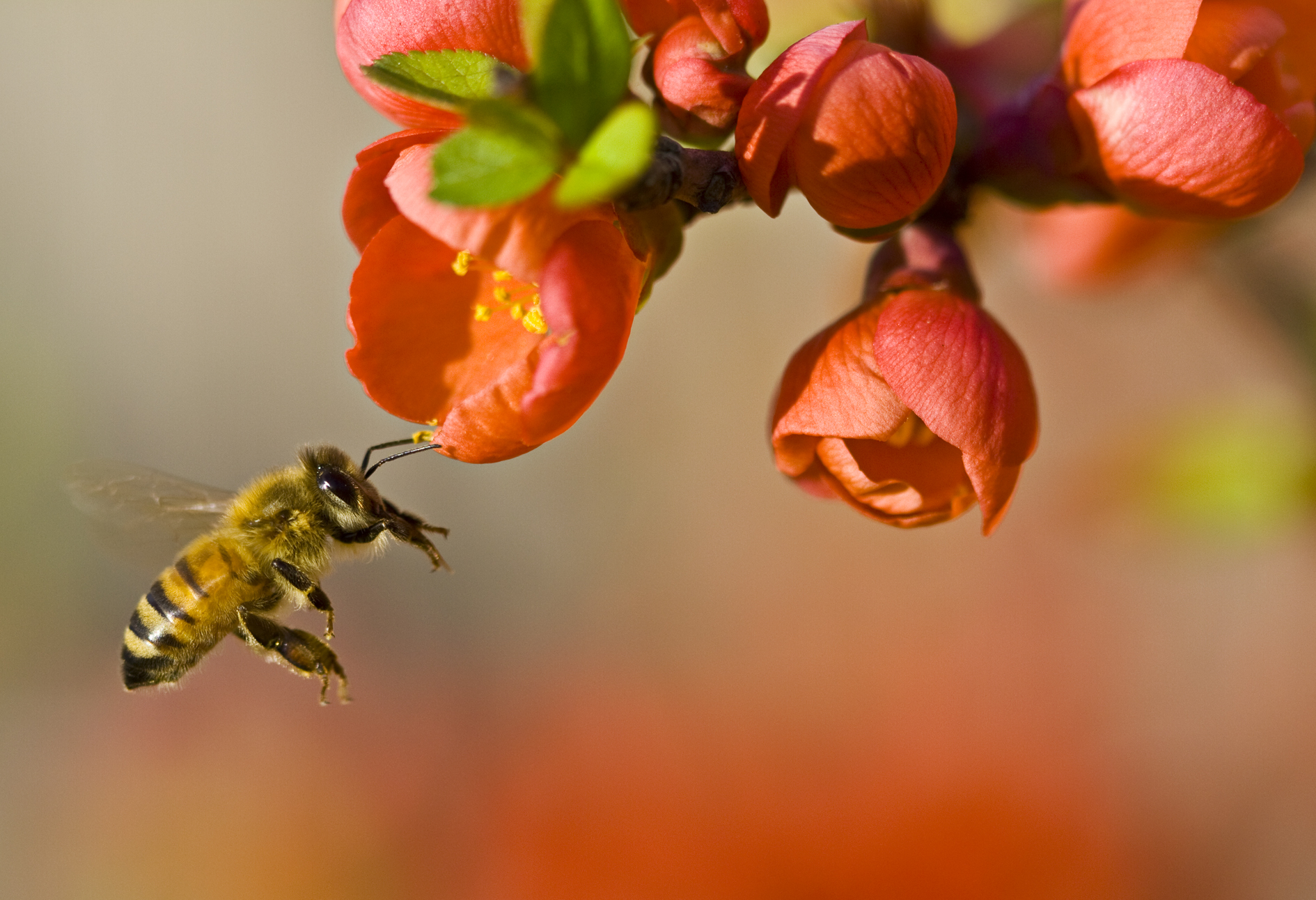
Honey bee pollinating flowers

Robert Page's background is in behavior and population genetics and the focus of his current research is on the evolution of complex social behavior. Using the honey bee as a model, he has dissected bee's complex foraging division of labor at all levels of biological organization – from gene networks to complex social interactions. His work, as well as that of his distinguished students, is outlined in his publication "The Spirit of the Hive: The Mechanisms of Social Evolution," released by Harvard University Press in 2013. As described on the fly leaf: "This book presents a comprehensive picture of the genetic and physiological mechanisms underlying the division of labor in honey bee colonies and explains how bees' complex social behavior has evolved over millions of years." His work has been cited in more than 18,000 publications and has an h-index value of 74.

== Honors ==
- Elected fellow of the American Association for the Advancement of Science. (1992)
- He received the Alexander von Humboldt Senior Scientist Award (the Humboldt Prize), the highest honor given by the German government to foreign scientists. (1995)
- Elected Foreign Member of the Brazilian Academy of Sciences. (1999)
- Robert E. Page is an elected fellow of the American Academy of Arts and Sciences. (2006)
- Elected to the Leopoldina – the German National Academy of Sciences, the longest continuing academy in the world. (2009)
- Fellow of theWissenschaftskolleg zu Berlin. (2009)
- Fellow of Entomological Society of America. (2012)
- He was awarded the Carl Friedrich von Siemens Fellowship. (2013)
- Elected fellow of the California Academy of Sciences. (2016)
- James W. Creasman Award of Excellence, Arizona State University Alumni Association. (2018)
- Distinguished Emeritus Award, University of California Davis. (2019)

== Publications ==
=== Journal articles ===
Robert Page has authored or coauthored more than 250 scientific studies or review articles on genetics and evolution of social insect behavior.

- Page, R. E. 1980. The evolution of multiple mating behavior of honey bee queens. Genetics 96: 263–273.
- Hunt, G.J., R.E. Page, M.K. Fondrk, and C.J. Dullum. 1995. Major quantitative trait loci affecting honey bee foraging behavior. Genetics 141: 1537–1545.
- Hunt, G. J, and R.E. Page. 1995. A linkage map of the honey bee, Apis mellifera, based on RAPD markers. Genetics 139: 1371–1382.
- Page, R.E., J. Erber, and M.K. Fondrk. 1998. The effect of genotype on response thresholds to sucrose and foraging behavior of honey bees (Apis mellifera L.). Journal of Comparative Physiology A 182: 489–500.
- Scheiner, R., J. Erber, and R.E. Page. 1999. Tactile learning and the individual evaluation of the reward in honey bees. Journal of Comparative Physiology A 185: 1–10.
- Beye, M., M. Hasselmann, M.K. Fondrk, R.E. Page, and S.W. Omholt. 2003. The gene csd is the primary signal for sexual development in the honeybee and encodes an SR-type protein. Cell 114: 419–429 [cover article].
- Amdam, G.V., K. Norberg, M.K. Fondrk, and R.E. Page. 2004. Reproductive ground plan may mediate colony-level effects on individual foraging behavior in honey bees. Proceedings of the National Academy of Sciences USA 101: 11350-11355.
- Amdam, G., A. Csondes, M.K., Fondrk, and R.E. Page. 2006. Complex social behavior derived from maternal reproductive traits. Nature 439: 76–78 [cover article].
- Nelson, C.M., K.E. Ihle, M.K. Fondrk, R.E. Page, and G.V. Amdam. 2007. The gene vitellogenin has multiple coordinating effects on social organization. PLOS Biology 5: 673–677.
- Linksvayer, T. A. and R.E. Page 2009. Honey bee social regulatory networks are shaped by colony-level selection. The American Naturalist 173 (3) E99-E107. DOI: 10.1086/596527.
- Page, R. E., T. A. Linksvayer, G.V. Amdam. Social life from solitary regulatory networks: a paradigm for insect sociality. 2009. Organization of insect societies: from genomes to socio-complexity. Harvard University Press, Cambridge. 357–376
- Amdam, G. V. and R. E. Page. 2010. The developmental genetics and physiology of honeybee societies. Animal Behavior 79: 973–980.
- Page, R. E., O. Rüppell, and G. V. Amdam. 2012. Genetics of reproduction and regulation of honey bee (Apis mellifera L.) social behavior. Annual Review of Genetics 46: 97–119.
- Beye M., C. Seelmann, T. Gempe, M. Hasselmann, Vekemans X., M. K. Fondrk, and R. E. Page. 2013. Gradual molecular evolution of a sex determination switch through incomplete penetrance of femaleness. Current Biology 23: 1–6.
- Ihle K. E., O. Rueppell, Z. Y. Huang, Y. Wang, M. K. Fondrk, R. E. Page, and G. V. Amdam. 2015. Genetic architecture of a hormonal response to gene knockdown in honey bees. Journal of Heredity 106: 155–165.
- Traynor K. S., Y. Wang, C. S. Brent, G. V. Amdam, R. E. Page Young and old honeybee (Apis mellifera) larvae differentially prime the developmental maturation of their caregivers. 2017. Animal Behaviour. 124: 193–202.

=== Books ===
- Page, Robert E.; Hölldobler, Bert (2013). The spirit of the hive: The mechanisms of social evolution. Cambridge, Mass.: Harvard University Press. ISBN 9780674073029.
- Laidlaw, Harry Hyde; Page, Robert E. (1997). Queen rearing and bee breeding (1st ed.). Kalamazoo, Mich: Wicwas Press. ISBN 187807508X.

=== Edited books ===
- Needham, G. R., R. E. Page, M. Delfinado Baker, and C. E. Bowman (editors). 1988. Africanized Honey Bees and Bee Mites. Ellis Horwood Ltd., West Sussex, England, 572 pp.
- Breed, M. D. and R. E. Page (editors). 1989. The Genetics of Social Evolution, Westview Press, Boulder, Colorado, 213 pp.
- Erickson, E. H., R. E. Page, and A. A. Hanna (editors). 2002. Proceedings of the 2nd International Conference on Africanized Honey Bees and Bee Mites Proceedings of the 2nd International Conference on Africanized Honey Bees and Bee Mites. The A.I. Root Co., Medina, Ohio, 379 pp.
