= Malcolm Page =

Malcolm Page may refer to:

- Malcolm Page (footballer) (born 1947), Welsh footballer
- Malcolm Page (sailor) (born 1972), Australian Olympic sailor
