= Page (given name) =

Page is a unisex given name. People with the name include:

- Page Belcher (1899–1980), American politician
- Page Cavanaugh (1922–2008), American jazz and pop pianist, vocalist and arranger
- Page Cortez (born 1961), American politician and businessman
- Page Falkinburg, Jr. (born 1956), American retired professional wrestler
- Page Fletcher (born 1951), Canadian actor
- Page Hamilton (born 1960), American guitarist, singer, songwriter and record producer, most notably with the alternative metal band Helmet
- Page Hopkins, American journalist
- Page Miller (born 1940), American public historian
- Page McConnell (born 1963), American musician and songwriter, most notably with the American rock band Phish
- Page Morris (1853–1924), American politician and judge
- Page Pate (1967–2022), American attorney
- Page Smith (1917–1995), American historian, professor, author and newspaper columnist

== See also ==
- D. Page Elmore (1939–2010), American politician
- W. Page Keeton (1909–1999), attorney and longtime dean of the University of Texas School of Law
- Paige (name)
