= Senator Page =

Senator Page may refer to:

== Members of the United States Senate ==
- Carroll S. Page (1843–1925), U.S. Senator from Vermont
- John Page (New Hampshire politician) (1787–1865), U.S. Senator from New Hampshire

== United States state senate members ==
- Alfred R. Page (1859–1931), New York State Senate
- Charles B. Page (1851–1912), New York State Senate
- Charles H. Page (1843–1912), Rhode Island State Senate
- George E. Page (1873–1959), Wisconsin State Senate
- Roy M. Page (1890–1958), New York State Senate
- Vivian L. Page (1894–1962), Virginia State Senate

== See also ==
- Alonzo C. Paige (1797–1868), New York State Senate
