= Page Airport (disambiguation) =

Page Airport may refer to:

- Page Airport (FAA: 9W2) in Walla Walla, Washington, United States
- Page Field (FAA: FMY) in Fort Myers, Florida, United States
- Page Municipal Airport (FAA: PGA) in Page, Arizona, United States
- Page Regional Airport (FAA: 64G) in Page, North Dakota, United States
- Clarence E. Page Municipal Airport (FAA: RCE) in Oklahoma City, Oklahoma, United States
