= Jerry D. Page =

United States Air Force general

- Born: February 27, 1915; Manila, Philippines
- Died: March 19, 1989 (aged 74)
- Military career
- Allegiance: United States of America
- Branch: United States Air Force
- Service years: 1938-1972
- Rank: Major General
- Commands: commandant Air War College
- Conflicts: World War II
- Awards: Air Force Distinguished Service Medal; Legion of Merit

Jerry Dentler Page (February 27, 1915 – March 19, 1989) was a major general in the United States Air Force and commandant of the Air War College who was reassigned after making controversial statements at the school. Page was considered to be one of the "ablest minds" of the Air Force in the 1960s.

== Career ==
General Page was born in Manila, Philippines. He grew up in Los Angeles, California, where he graduated from Manual Arts High School and received a Bachelor of Science degree in industrial management at the University of Southern California in 1937. During his military career he also graduated from the Command and General Staff School at Fort Leavenworth, Kansas and the Armed Forces Staff College in Norfolk, Virginia.

After a year serving as the first field secretary for his college fraternity, Phi Kappa Tau, he began his military career in June 1938 as an aviation cadet in the Army Air Corps. He received his pilot wings and commission at Kelly Field, Texas, in 1939. His first years of service were as flying instructor, flight commander, cadet commandant, flying director and operations officer at Randolph Field, Texas.

During World War II, General Page served in the South Pacific area with the XIII Fighter Command as operations officer and was awarded the Legion of Merit. He flew 32 combat missions in P-38 Lightning and P-39 Airacobra fighter aircraft.

He returned to the United States in January 1946 and assumed duties as deputy base commander of Hamilton Field, California. In February 1948 he entered the Armed Forces Staff College, Norfolk, Virginia. He was assigned in July 1948 as Air Force liaison officer in the newly created Office of the Secretary of Defense. In April 1949 he was appointed executive to the deputy chief of staff for operations, Headquarters U.S. Air Force, Washington, D.C.

In September 1950 General Page went to London, England, as Air Force representative to the Northern European Regional Planning Group. In July 1951 he became deputy chief of staff for plans for Allied Air Forces Northern Europe with headquarters in Oslo, Norway. After two years, he returned to the United States to serve as chief of the Doctrine Division of the Evaluation Staff at the Air War College, Maxwell Air Force Base, Alabama, from August 1953 to August 1955.

In August 1955 he entered the National War College and in September 1956 assumed command of the 3525th Combat Crew Training Wing (Fighter), at Williams Air Force Base, Arizona.

He returned to Headquarters U.S. Air Force in June 1960 as deputy director for war plans for the deputy chief of staff for plans and programs, and in September 1961 he became deputy director for aerospace plans for the deputy chief of staff for plans and operations. For his service in these two assignments he received the Distinguished Service Medal, the nation's highest peacetime military award.

General Page was transferred to Headquarters Air Force Systems Command at Andrews Air Force Base in Maryland in 1964 where he earned a second Legion of Merit as deputy chief of staff for plans. In August 1966 he assumed the dual position of vice commander of the Air University and commandant of the Air War College at Maxwell Air Force Base, Alabama.

== Controversy ==
Page was alleged to have revealed confidential bomb shortages in Vietnam and to have criticized defense policies of Defense Secretary Robert McNamara during an Air War College seminar for senior Air Force Reserve officers in December 1966. Even though the seminar's discussions were understood to be classified Secret and to be strictly confined behind closed doors, Page was relieved of his command and transferred to the air division command at Okinawa "without prejudice." Arizona senator Barry Goldwater accused one of the seminar attendees, a Reserve colonel and politician recently defeated in his reelection bid for the governorship of Arizona, of having made complaints to the Department of Defense that led to General Page's relief and subsequent transfer.

Page's relief raised concerns not only with the Air War College faculty but through the faculties of the nation's other senior service colleges (SSC) as well, as it struck at one of the basic tenets of SSC education: the free give-and-take of academic discussion behind the closed doors of the college.

In March 1967, because of his comments, he was assigned as commander of the 313th Air Division at Kadena Air Base, Okinawa. There he earned the Air Force Distinguished Service Medal. In 1969 General Page assumed his final command - Sheppard Technical Training Center, Sheppard Air Force Base, Texas. He retired August 1, 1972.

He was a qualified jet fighter pilot with more than 5,800 hours of flying time. He was also a recipient of the Air Medal and the Army Commendation Medal.
