= Motorola Pageboy II =

1974 alarm pager model

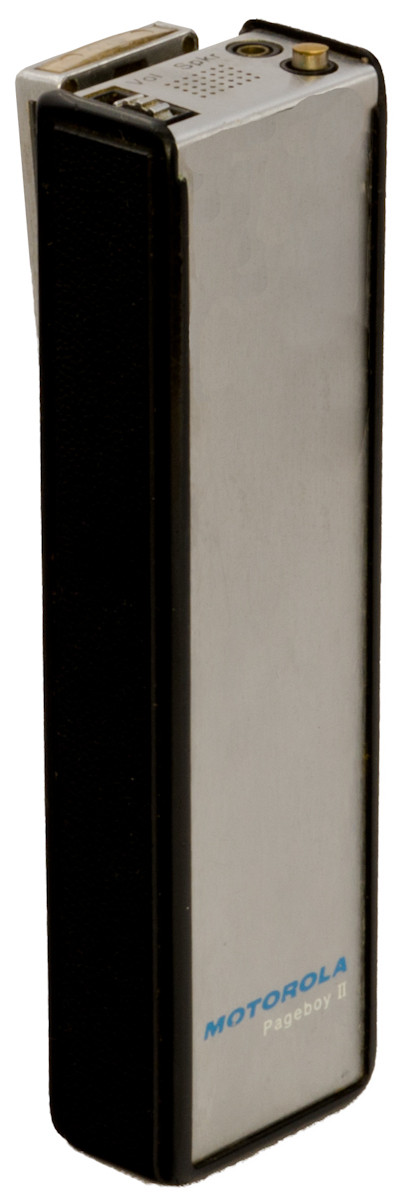
Motorola’s Pageboy II

Motorola Pageboy II was a pager and the successor to the Motorola Pageboy.

== History ==
The Motorola pager was a small radio receiver that delivered a message individually or widespread to those carrying the device.

The first successful consumer pager was Motorola’s Pageboy I which was introduced in 1974. This type (without display) could not store messages, however, it was small, portable and notified its wearer that a message had been sent.

== Pageboy II ==
Motorola’s Pageboy II was launched in 1975 for the United States and 1976 for Europe in various types. Pb II 5-tone only 68–88 MHz / 146–174 MHz (US and Eur). Pb II tone only for 5-tone 80,6–88 MHz / 146–174 MHz (US). Pb II tone & voice radio for 2-tone signalling systems 68–88 MHz / 146–174 MHz (US). Pb II A04FNC Series radio pager 450–512 MHz (Eur). Pb II MAA04FNC1568AA 440–470 MHz für Funftonfolge-Rufsysteme (Eur). Pb II radio pager H04BNC Series 406–420 MHz, 450–470 MHz (US and Eur). The variety and reliability made the system popular worldwide.

The European system worked strictly in the 85–87, 150–170 and later on in the 450–512 MHz band and was based on the ZVEI codes. ZVEI is the abbreviation of Zentral Verband der Electrotechnischen Industrie West Germany (central union for the electro technical industry). This organization was responsible for a fixed industrial norm sequence of 5 selective call tones.

The device was in use to alert individuals or groups of persons within fire brigades or civil protection organizations. Though the device was even smaller than the Pageboy I, its speaker was pointed upward so that the alerting beeps followed by a voice message always came through. For its time, the device had an outstanding receiver sensitivity, which was reached by using IC circuitry.

Even now, Motorola’s Pageboy II is still in use. As many fire brigades switched over to digital equipment their outdated Pageboy II’s found their way to industrial safety & medical organizations.
