= Charles Page (disambiguation) =

Charles Page (1860–1926) was an American philanthropist, creator of Sand Springs Home for orphans and widows .

Charles Page may also refer to:

- Charlie Page (1917–2010), Australian footballer
- Charles B. Page (1851–1912), American lawyer and politician
- Charles Edward Page (1840-1925), American physician and hydrotherapist
- Charles Frederick Page (1864-1937), American airship inventor
- Charles Grafton Page (1812–1868), American inventor
- Charles H. Page (1843–1912), U.S. Representative from Rhode Island
- Charles Henry Page (1876–1957), Texas architect
- Charles Page (cricketer) (1884–1921), English cricketer
- Charles Page (photographer) (born 1946), Australian photographer
- Charles Page (politician), Canadian politician
