= Justice Page =

Justice Page may refer to:

- Alan Page (born 1945), associate justice of the Minnesota Supreme Court
- Arthur Page (judge) (1876–1958), British-appointed Chief Justice of the High Court of Judicature at Rangoon
- E. M. Page (1893–1959), associate justice of the Oregon Supreme Court for less than a year
- Elwin L. Page (1876–1974), associate justice of the New Hampshire Supreme Court
- Henry Page (1841–1913), associate justice of the Maryland Court of Appeals
- William W. Page (1836–1897), associate justice of the Oregon Supreme Court for four months

== See also ==
- Judge Page (disambiguation)
