= Michael Page (disambiguation) =

Michael Page (born 1987) is a British professional boxer and mixed martial artist.

Michael Page may also refer to:

== People ==
- Michael Page (activist), co-founder of Celebrate Bisexuality Day
- Michael Page (cricketer) (1941–2026), English cricketer
- Michael Page (equestrian) (born 1938), American equestrian
- Michael Fitzgerald Page (1922–2014), Australian writer and editor
- Mike Page (1940–2021), Major League Baseball outfielder

== Other uses ==
- Michael Page (company), a British recruitment firm
