= Thomas Page =

Thomas Page may refer to:

- Thomas Page (MP) in 1558, MP for Rochester
- Thomas Page (King's), vice-chancellor of the University of Cambridge in 1676
- Thomas Hyde Page (1746–1821), British military engineer and cartographer
- Thomas Scudder Page (1800–1877), American politician
- Thomas Page (engineer) (1803–1877), British civil engineer
- Thomas Jefferson Page (1808–1899), United States Navy officer
- Thomas Ethelbert Page (1850–1936), British classicist
- Thomas Nelson Page (1853–1922), American author, lawyer, and ambassador
- Thomas Page (cricketer) (1872–1953), English cricketer
- Thomas Spurgeon Page (1879–1958), Northern Rhodesian politician
- Tom Page (footballer) (1888–1973), English soccer player
- Tom Page (American football) (1931–2022), American football coach
- Tommy Page (1970–2017), American singer-songwriter
