= William Page =

William, Will, Willie, or Bill Page may refer to:

== Law and politics ==
- William Page (MP) (died after 1584), English politician
- William W. Page (1836–1897), American jurist in Oregon
- William Page (politician) (1848–1925), Australian politician
- William Main Page (1869–1940), British lawyer and esperantist

== Others ==
- William Page (painter) (1811–1885), American painter
- William Hamilton Page (1829–1909), American type designer
- William Page (cricketer) (1847–1904), English cricketer
- William Nelson Page (1854–1932), American industrialist
- William Page (historian) (1861–1934), English historian
- William Tyler Page (1868–1942), American public servant
- Willie Page (1896-1981), English footballer
- Davidge Page (William Davidge Page, died 1939), British geologist
- Bill Page (1925–2017), American musician
- Will Page (fl. 2010s–2020s), British economist
