= Bernard Pagès =

French sculptor (1940–2026)

- Pagès in 1995
- Born: 21 September 1940; Cahors, France
- Died: 13 October 2026 (aged 86)
- Occupation: Sculptor

Bernard Pagès (French: [bɛʁnˈaʁ paʒˈɛ]; 21 September 1940 – 13 October 2026) was a French sculptor.

The husband of writer Maryline Desbiolles, he failed the entrance exam to the Beaux-Arts de Paris. However, he still pursued a career in sculpture and took part in exhibitions such as Hommage à Gaston Bachelard at the Place du Théâtre in Roche-sur-Yon from 1985 to 1986. He was also part of the "1 % artistique" exhibition in 2005 at the University of Limoges. His works can be found in the public collection of the Fonds régional d'art contemporain.

Pagès died on 13 October 2026, at the age of 86.
