= Tim Page =

Tim Page may refer to:

- Tim Page (photographer) (1944–2022), British-Australian photojournalist
- Tim Page (actor) (born 1947), New Zealand-born Australian actor
- Tim Page (music critic) (born 1954), American music critic, biographer, professor and memoirist
