= Bob Page =

Bob Page may refer to:

- Bob Page (Deus Ex character), a fictional character in the game Deus Ex
- Bob Page (sportscaster), American sportscaster
- Bob Page (rower) (1936–1991), New Zealand rower also known as Bob Page

== See also ==
- Robert Page (disambiguation)
