= Jonathan Page =

Jonathan Page may refer to:

- Jonathan Page (cyclist) (born 1976), American cyclo-cross cyclist
- Jonathan Page (footballer) (born 1990), English footballer
- Jacko Page (Jonathan Page, born 1959), British general
