= Pages (surname) =

Pages, Pagés, or Pagès is a surname. It may refer to:

- Andy Pages, Cuban baseball player
- Beatriz Pagés, Mexican journalist
- Bernard Pagès (1940–2026), French sculptor
- Carlos Pages, Argentine rower
- Edmond Pagès, French cyclist
- Évelyne Pagès, French journalist
- Fidel Pagés, Spanish surgeon
- Frédéric Pagès (born 1950), French journalist and humorist
- Hernán Pagés, Argentine footballer
- Josep Pagès, Spanish politician
- María Pagés, Spanish dancer
- Pedro Pagés (catcher), Venezuelan baseball player
- Pedro Pagés (outfielder), Cuban baseball player
- Tom Pagès, French motocross rider
- Vicenç Pagès, Spanish writer

== See also ==
- Carmen Pagés-Serra, Spanish economist
- Marguerite Pagès-Marinier, French journalist
- Brigitte Boccone-Pagès, Monégasque politician
- Étienne Joseph Louis Garnier-Pagès, French politician
- Louis-Antoine Garnier-Pagès, French politician
- Salvador Casañas y Pagés, Spanish cardinal
