= The Pages Conservation Park =

Protected area in South Australia

- IUCN category Ia (strict nature reserve)
- Location within South Australia
- Location: South Australia
- Nearest city: Cape Jervis
- Coordinates: 35°46′17″S 138°17′42″E
- Area: 70.23 km^{2} (27.12 sq mi)
- Established: 16 March 1967
- Visitors: 'few visitors' (in 1983)
- Governing body: Department for Environment and Water

The Pages Conservation Park is a protected area in the Australian state of South Australia which is associated with the island group known as The Pages located in Backstairs Passage about 25 kilometres (16 miles) south-east of Cape Jervis and about 98 kilometres (61 miles) south south-west of the state capital of Adelaide.

The conservation park consists of the island group and adjoining waters. The islands first acquired protected area status as a fauna conservation reserve proclaimed under the Crown Lands Act 1929. On 27 April 1972, the fauna conservation reserve was reconstituted as The Pages Conservation Park under the National Parks and Wildlife Act 1972. On 24 December 1997, the boundary of the conservation park was extended 2 nautical miles (3.7 km) seawards in order to control berleying associated with both shark cage diving and shark fishing. As of 2018, it covered an area of 70.23 square kilometres (27.12 sq mi).

In 1980, the conservation park was described as follows:

Two small islands and a reef which have some aesthetic significance. The islands support a large breeding colony of Australian sea lions and have long been recognised as an important area for seabirds… Two small rocky islands and a reef in Backstairs Passage. The islands are predominantly rock though their relatively flat tops support a low open shrubland of Senecio lautus with widely scattered Atriplex sp and Bulbinopsis bulbosa in small pockets of soil. Steeper slopes support a mat of Disphyma clavellatum and occasional Enchylaena tomentosa…

The isolation, absence of introduced species and only occasional human visits, has ensured habitat preservation.

The conservation park is classified as an IUCN Category IA protected area. In 1980, it was listed on the now-defunct Register of the National Estate.

== See also ==
- Protected areas of South Australia
