= Paige Segal =

American actress (born 1987)

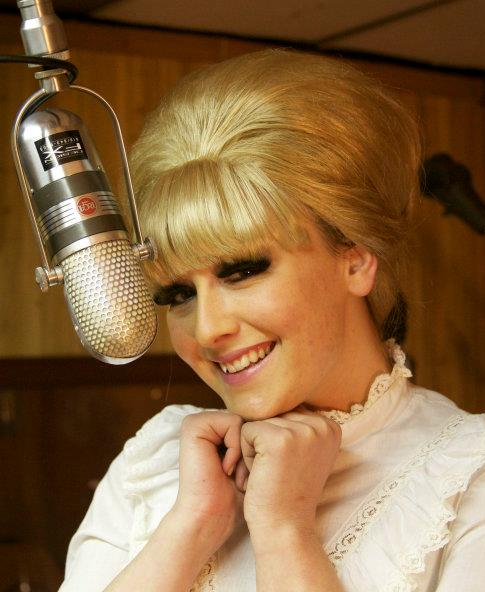
- Segal as Dusty Springfield in the 2014 film The Soul of Blue Eye
- Born: May 14, 1987 (age 38); Los Angeles, California, U.S.
- Occupation: Actress
- Years active: 1997–present

Paige Segal (born May 14, 1987, in Los Angeles, California) is an American actress.

== Biography ==
A former child actress, Segal has acted in episodes of Malcolm in the Middle, George Lopez, among other sitcoms, as well as starring in the indie films The Day the Music Died as Peggy Sue and Operation Splitsville as Louise.
