= Paige, Virginia =

Unincorporated community in Virginia, United States

Coordinates: 38°04′21″N 77°25′08″W

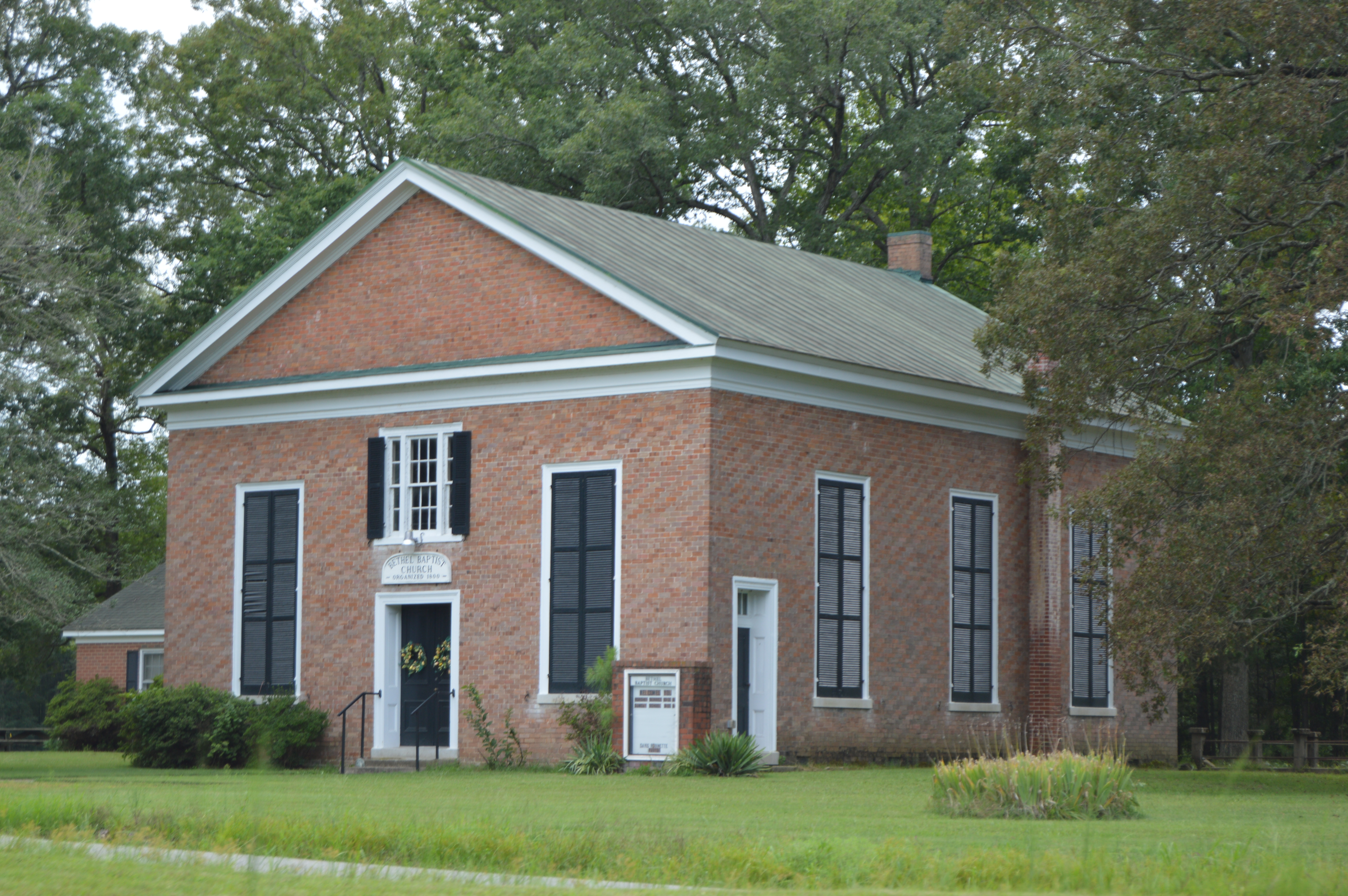
Bethel Baptist Church

Paige is an unincorporated community in Caroline County, in the U.S. state of Virginia.
