= Robert B. Tabb =

American doctor and politician

Robert Bruce Tabb (August 10, 1833 - November 12, 1906) was a doctor and state legislator in Virginia. He represented Norfolk County, Virginia, in the 1883-1884 session.

== Biography ==
He was born August 10, 1833, in Elizabeth City County, Virginia, to John and Mary Anne Veale Tabb. His mother died October 21, 1842, and his father died December 85, 1860. He was of Caucasian descent.

He graduated with an M.D. from the University of Pennsylvania in 1855. He then started working as a doctor in Camden County, North Carolina

At the start of the American Civil War he enlisted with the Bourrough's cavalry battalion later joining the 15th Virginia Regiment and he was wounded and removed from active duty on November 10, 1862, but continued to serve as a doctor in the hospital.

He married Elizabeth Anne Warden April 25, 1861, who had been born in 1837 and died in 1891 and together they had several children.

After the war they moved to Norfolk County and he worked as both a doctor and a farmer.

He was elected to represent Norfolk County, Virginia, as a Democrat in 1883 and served in the Virginia House of Delegates in the 1883-1884 session, serving on the Asylums and Prisons, Labor and the Poor and Retrenchment and the Economy committees.

Tabb was offered the nomination to serve in the house of delegates again for Norfolk county in 1887 but declined due to "the force of circumstances, unnecessary to mention".

He also served on the Norfolk County School Board and was an elections judge for Indian Creek, Norfolk County.

He died November 12, 1906, after suffering a long illness at the house of his daughter Mrs Charles A. Stewart in Falls Church, Virginia. He was buried at Oak Hill Cemetery.
