= Richard G. L. Paige =

American politician (1846–1904)

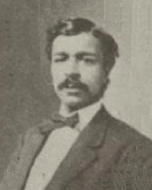

Member of the Virginia House of Delegates from Norfolk County
- In office December 3, 1879 – December 5, 1883
- Preceded by: W. Scott Sykes
- Succeeded by: Robert B. Tabb
- In office December 6, 1871 – December 1, 1875
- Succeeded by: Miles Connor

Personal details
- Born: Richard Gault Leslie Paige; May 31, 1846 Norfolk, Virginia, U.S.
- Died: September 21, 1904 (aged 58) Norfolk, Virginia, U.S.
- Party: Republican
- Education: Howard University

Richard Gault Leslie Paige (May 31, 1846 – September 21, 1904) was a machinist and politician who served as a member of the Virginia House of Delegates, representing Norfolk County, from 1871 to 1875 during the Reconstruction era, and again from 1879 to 1883. A Republican, he was one of the first African Americans to serve in Virginia's government. He was successful in business.

== See also ==
- African American officeholders from the end of the Civil War until before 1900

Virginia House of Delegates
Preceded by	Virginia Delegate for Norfolk County; 1871–1875	Succeeded by Miles Connor
Preceded by W. Scott Sykes	Virginia Delegate for Norfolk County; 1879–1883	Succeeded by Robert B. Tabb
