= Tony Paige (boxing) =

- Born: September 11, 1953 (age 73); The Bronx, New York, U.S.
- Occupations: Radio host, boxing analyst
- Website: WFAN profile

Anthony C. Paige (born September 11, 1953) is an American radio talk show host and boxing commentator. Based in New York, Paige was an overnight host for WFAN. Save for a three-year stint where he was not working for the station, Paige had hosted programming on WFAN since 1995 until his retirement on September 14, 2019.

== Biography ==
=== Early years ===
Tony Paige was born in the South Bronx and lived in the Forest Projects. Paige went to Taft High School, and then attended City College of New York and Florida A&M University.

=== Professional career ===
From January 1993 to December 1996, Paige served as president of the Boxing Writers Association of America. He was the first black man to hold that position in the 54-year history of the organization.

Paige started working at WFAN in 1995, hosting one night a week, then picking up extra shifts when he could. Then he left in 2000 to work for ESPN Radio New York and Duva Boxing before returning to WFAN in 2003 and staying for the rest of his career. Paige primarily worked the overnight shift throughout his 16 year career at WFAN. He is the longest tenure for a overnight talker in station history. Paige announced his retirement from WFAN on June 4, 2019, with his last show on September 14. Paige ended his last broadcast by reminding people to never drink and drive, which was a common reminder he said during shows throughout his career.

He is also a United States field producer for KOTV, a weekly boxing program based in London, England, that airs in 70 countries worldwide.

He has worked as a boxing broadcast journalist for ESPN, ESPN2, Showtime, SHOBOX, Prime Network, MSG Network, and SportsNet New York among various others.

=== Personal life ===
Paige lives in East Windsor Township, New Jersey with his wife and youngest son, Jaylen. Paige is also brother to computer engineer Tim Paige. His oldest son Dante is a former Goldman Sachs employee.

Paige was diagnosed with cancer in 2018, which required kidney surgery. He had a quarter of his left kidney removed along with a three-centimeter cancerous tumor, which caused him to take a leave from WFAN for a short time. He has said that health played no role in his decision to retire a year later.

He is a Tampa Bay Buccaneers fan, a fact that many callers call attention to on his show.
