= Pich =

Pich is a given name and surname. Notable people with the name include:

- Róbert Pich (born 1988), Slovak footballer
- Sopheap Pich (born 1971), Cambodian American artist
- Pich Sophea (born 1985), Cambodian singer
