= Epingline =

Silk or wool fabric with fine cords

Epingline (Epingh) is a silk, or rayon, and wool fabric with fine cords. It is formed with a structure similar to a crepe.

== Etymology ==
The name “epingline” is derived from the French word épingle, meaning a pin.

== Material and weave ==
Epingline is woven with a warp of silk or rayon and a worsted weft.

== Use ==
The cloth is used as a dress material.

== See also ==
- Crêpe (textile)
- Momie cloth
