= Georgette (fabric) =

Sheer, lightweight crepe fabric made from silk or manufactured fibres

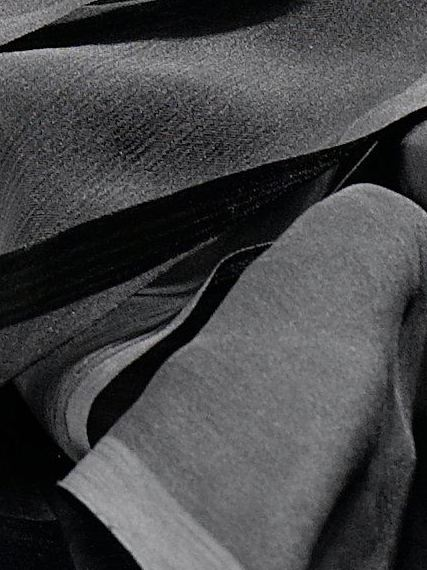

Georgette (from crêpe Georgette) is a sheer, lightweight, dull-finished crêpe fabric named after the early 20th-century French dressmaker Georgette de la Plante.

Originally made from silk, Georgette is made with highly twisted yarns. Its characteristic crinkly surface is created by alternating S- and Z-twist yarns in both warp and weft.

Georgette is made in solid colors and prints and is used for blouses, dresses, evening gowns, saris, and trimmings. Georgette has a very light and drapey hand, rendering it more common in loose flowing garments and less so in more structured pieces. Silk georgette is relatively delicate, but varieties made with synthetic fibers can be more resilient to damage. The crepe style S- and Z-twist weave makes the fabric springier and less lustrous than the closely related chiffon.

== Gallery ==
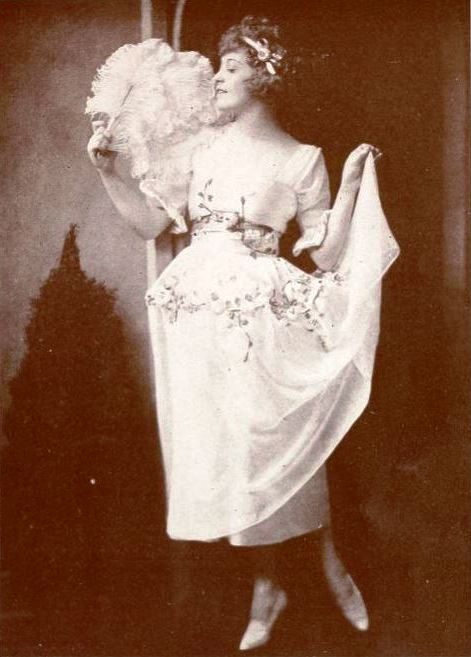
Jackie Saunders in a georgette overdress, 1920

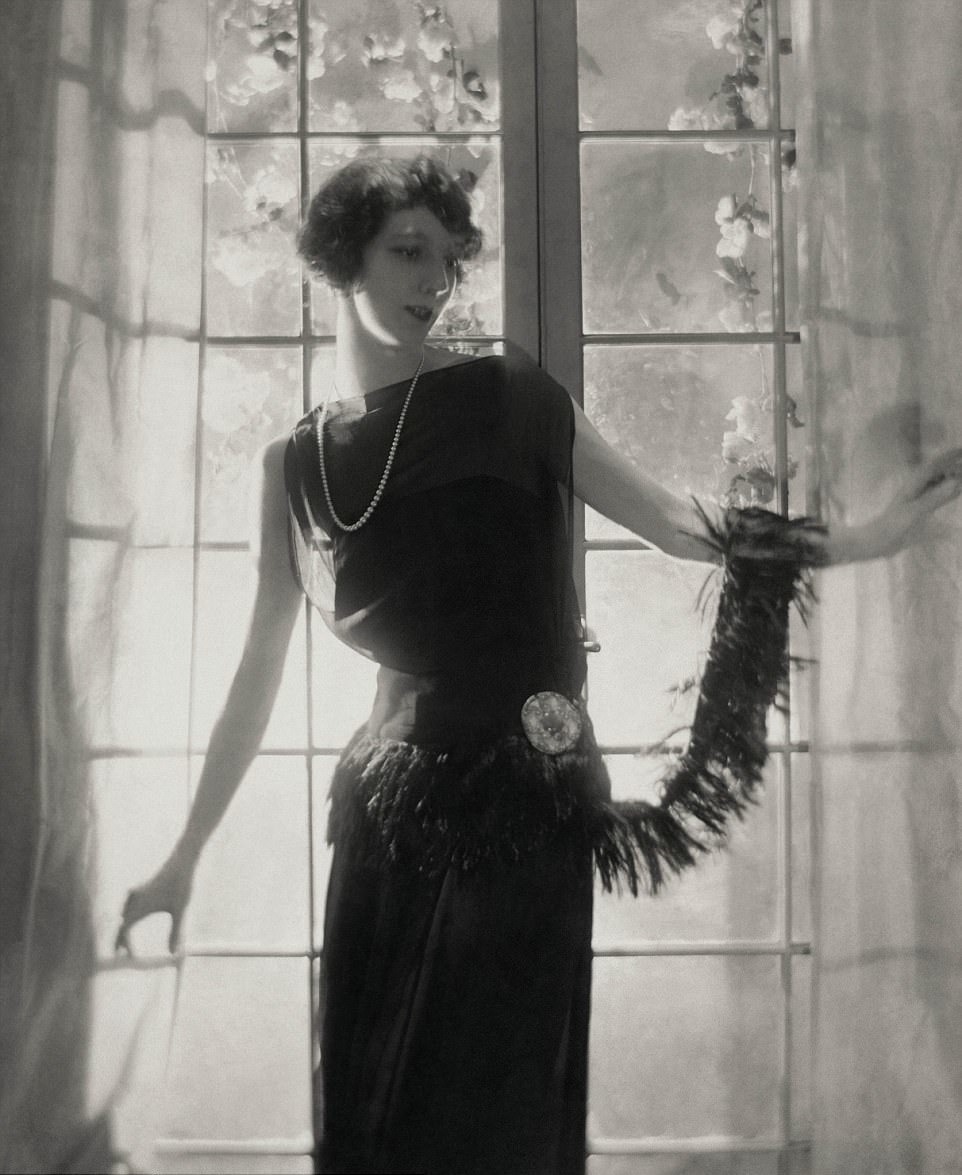
Desiree Lubovska in a black georgette dress by Jean Patou, c.1921

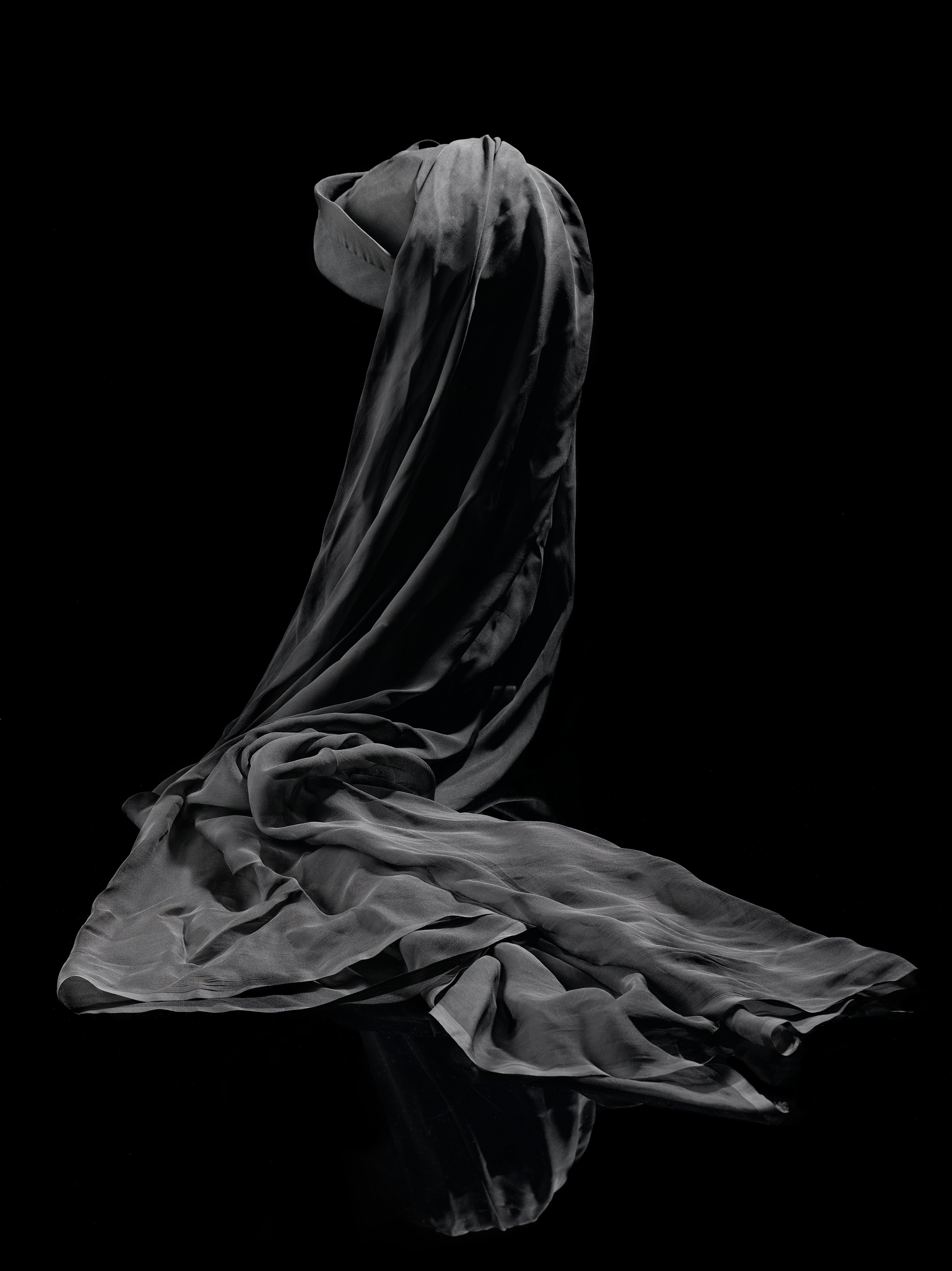
Mourning cap with georgette veil, Belgian, 1935

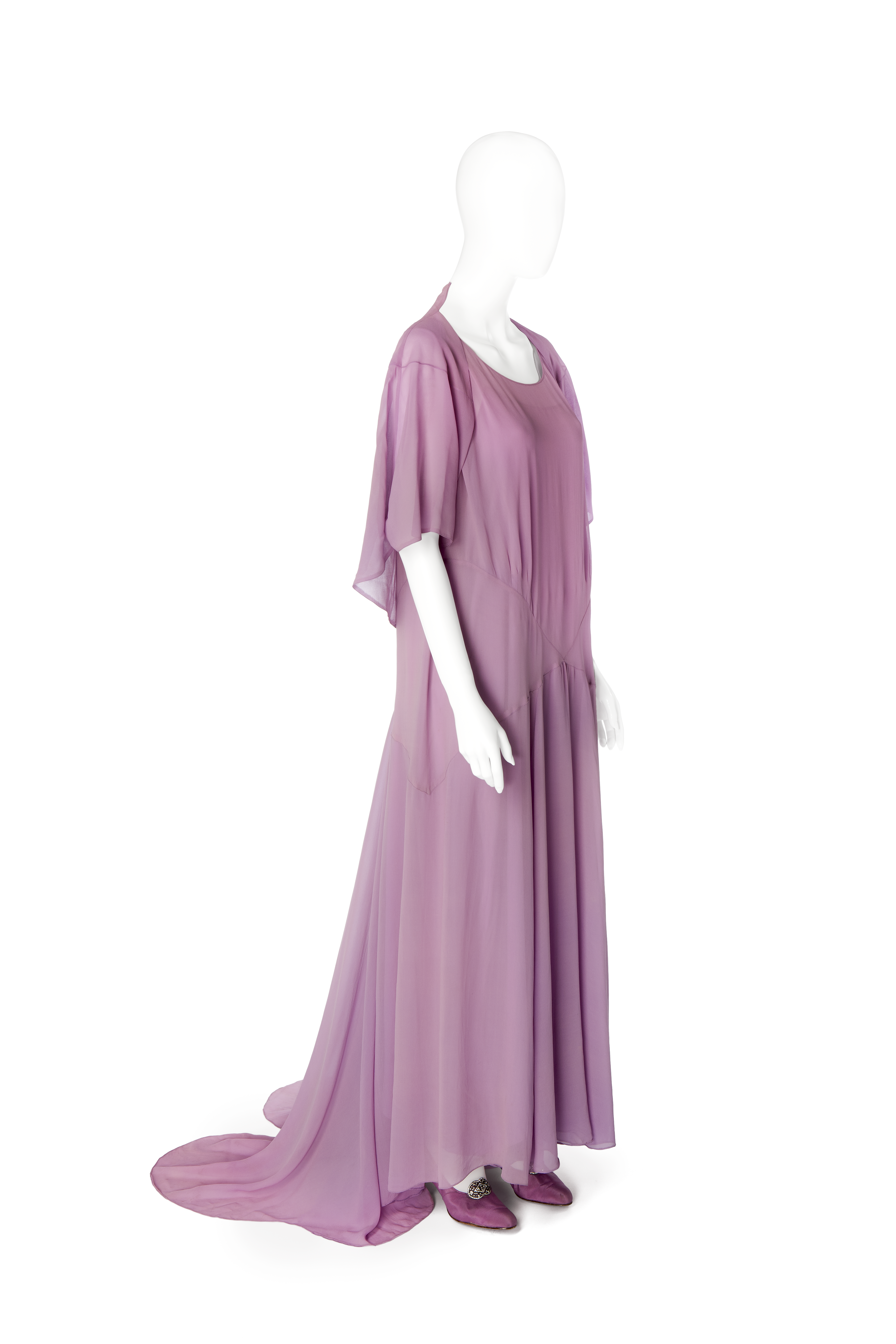
Dress in pink georgette, Swedish, c.1930

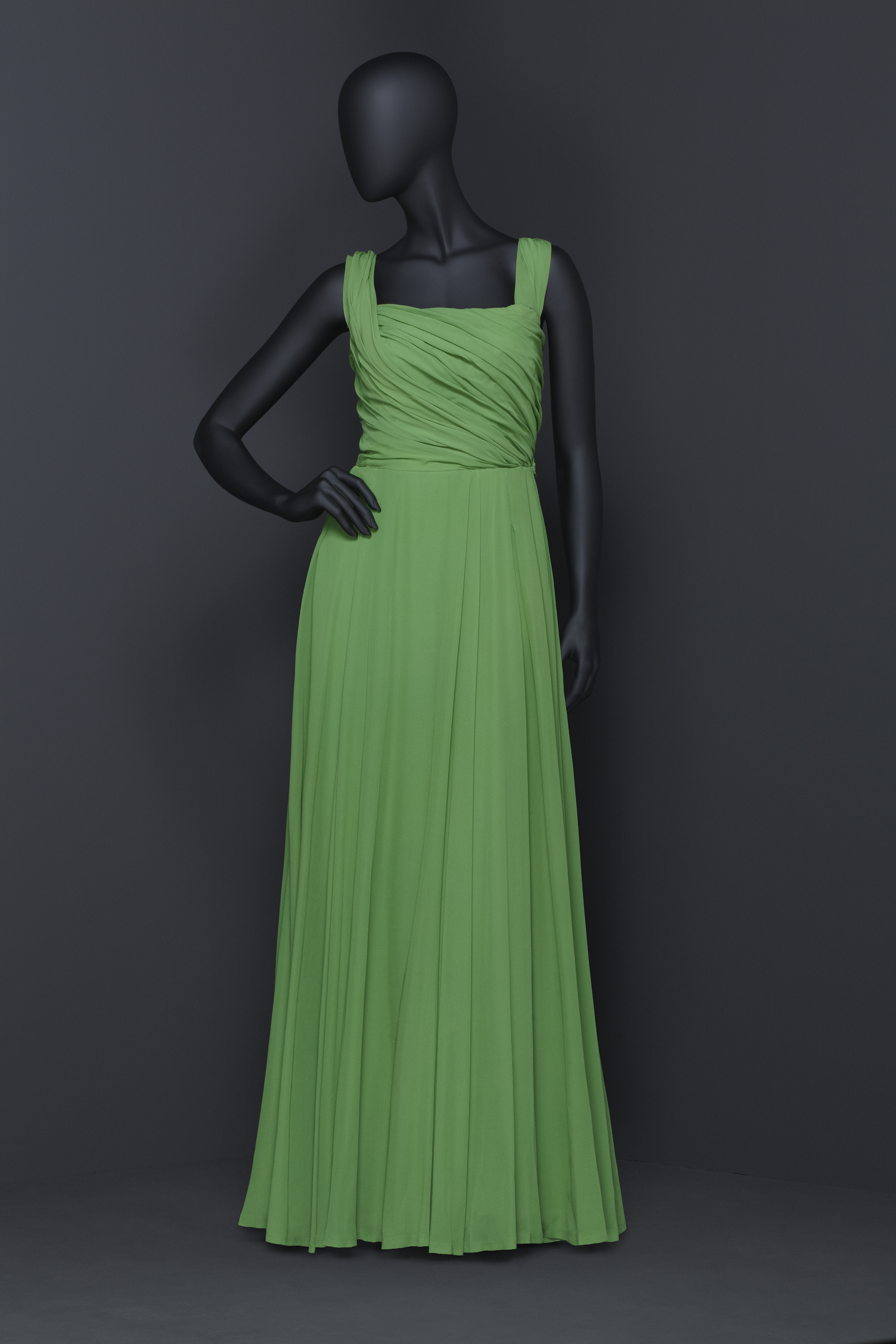
Evening dress in green georgette, Swedish, 1950s
