= Jonathan Sprout =

- Born: April 12, 1952 (age 74); Hightstown, New Jersey, United States
- Origin: Pennsylvania, United States
- Genres: New Age/Classical and children's music
- Occupations: Musician, singer, songwriter

Jonathan Sprout (born John Wells Sprout, Jr. on April 12, 1952 in Hightstown, New Jersey, United States) is an American songwriter, performer and recording artist. He has released twelve albums, primarily in the children's music genre. Between 1994 and 2014, he researched, wrote, and recorded songs about American historical figures, releasing four albums that received 26 national awards. In 2010 his ninth album, American Heroes #3, was nominated for a GRAMMY Award in the Best Musical Album For Children category at the 52nd Annual GRAMMY Awards.

== Biography ==
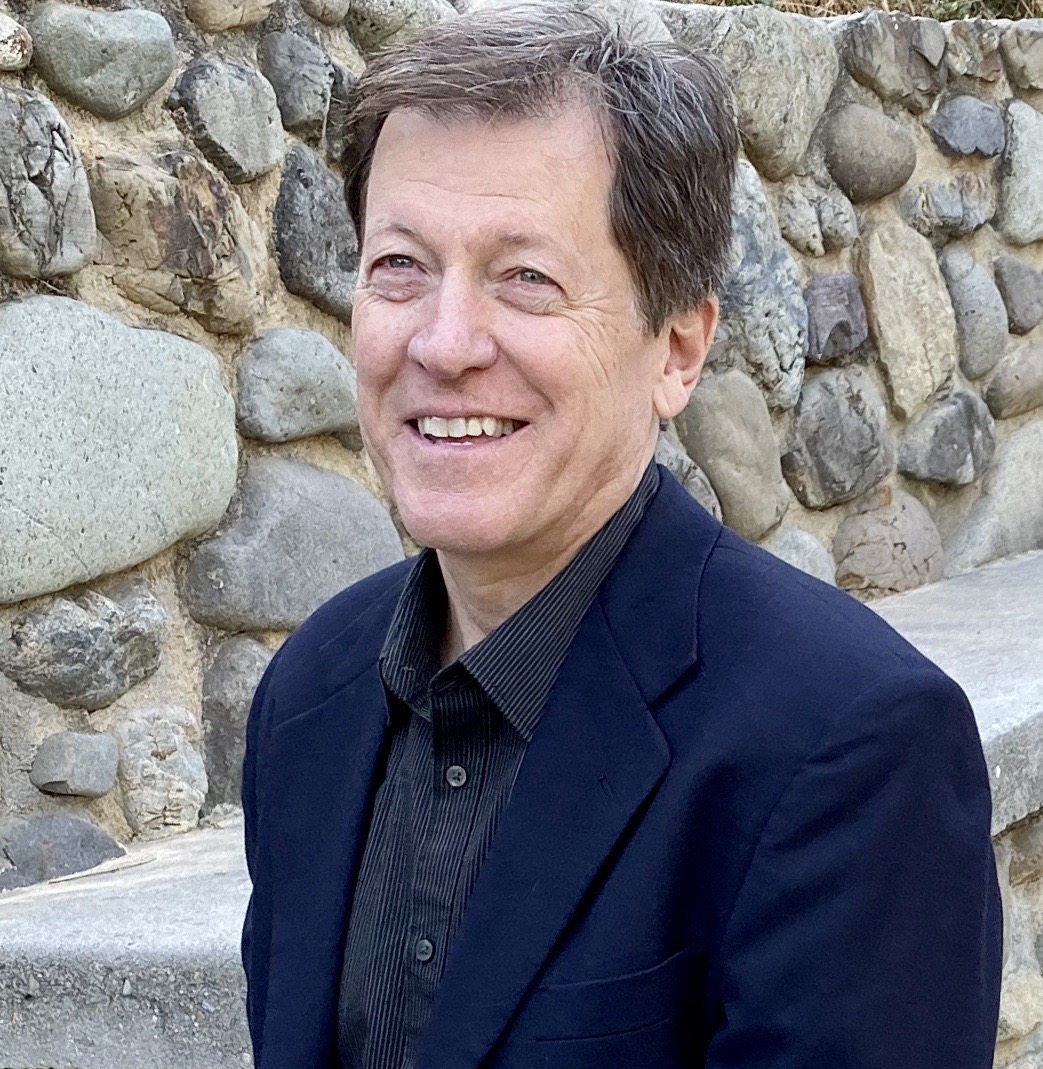
Jonathan Sprout

Sprout grew up in Hightstown, New Jersey. His high school years were spent at the Peddie School in Hightstown; Sprout developed his interest in music while attending Bucknell University in Lewisburg, Pennsylvania. He was a member of the Tau Kappa Epsilon fraternity, participated in competitive swimming, and was a member of Cap and Dagger, the campus theatre organization. He played small acting parts in Marat Sade, The Alchemist and The Wizard of Oz. Sprout received his B.A. in psychology from Bucknell in 1974.

Sprout began his musical career as a singer-songwriter and guitarist, performing on the Princeton University campus in Princeton, New Jersey. He wrote two songs for The Lettermen, including the title track To a Friend.

In December 1974, he moved to Estes Park, Colorado, to work at the YMCA of the Rockies. In May 1975, he began his first full-time music career, performing four-hour sets of original and cover songs at The Edel House in Estes Park, Colorado; He performed regularly in the ski resort of Killington, Vermont, from 1977 to 1979; in Estes Park and at the 1980 Winter Olympics in Lake Placid, New York.

In 1981, Sprout performed for the elementary school classroom of his mother, Carol Sprout, and later returned to give his first full children's concert at Melvin H. Kreps School in East Windsor, New Jersey.

From 1986 to 2007, Sprout performed 4,193 children's concerts and taught 472 songwriting workshops for children, primarily in New Jersey, Pennsylvania, New York, Delaware, and Maryland. As of 2026, he has performed more than 5,500 children's concerts, taught more than 800 songwriting workshops, and given more than 1,000 shows for adult audiences.

== Career ==
=== Early career ===
In 1986, Sprout co-produced the first of four albums with recording engineer and guitarist Leslie Chew. Their On the Radio was the second album of rock music for children ever made in America. In 1990, Sprout Recordings released Lullabies for a New Age, the first album of original New Age music ever recorded for children.

In 1991, Sprout released Kid Power, an album intended to support children's self-esteem. In 1994, he released Dr. Music, the title track of which remained in the top 10 for several months on Radio AAHS, a U.S. syndicated children's radio network.

=== American heroes ===
In 1994, Sprout began a 20-year stint researching, writing, and recording songs about American heroes. This resulted in four albums that garnered 26 national awards, including a GRAMMY nomination for Best Musical Album For Children. Sprout wrote a tribute to John Muir because he co-wrote a song about him that appears on his Grammy nominated American Heroes #3 CD.

=== Force For Good ===
In 2016, Sprout founded Force For Good, a music and film project addressing social and environmental issues. He collaborated with producer Joe Mennonna and filmmaker Rodney Whittenberg.

The project released monthly films starting in January 2020, along with two CDs: Passions (2020) and Innocence (2021). The film "Safe" was a finalist at the Independent Shorts Awards.

Beginning in 2020, the Force For Good team produced music videos focused on renewable energy, including Solar Energy: Powerful and Profitable, Wind Energy: The Future, Now!, and Ice. In 2025, Sprout gave a presentation on adopting a net-zero lifestyle in Langhorne, Pennsylvania.

== Awards and recognition ==
The four American Heroes albums received a combined 26 national awards, including recognition from the NAPPA, the Parents' Choice Foundation, the Film Advisory Board, the Dove Foundation, and Mom's Choice Awards.

== Discography ==
Music recordings

- Angels Everywhere (Green Mountain Records, 1978)
- A Light in the Night (Sprout Recordings, 1984)
- On the Radio (Sprout Recordings, 1986)
- Lullabies for a New Age (Sprout Recordings, 1991)
- Kid Power (Sprout Recordings, 1991)
- Dr. Music (Sprout Recordings, 1994)
- More American Heroes (Sprout Recordings, 2000)
- American Heroes (Sprout Recordings, 1996)
- American Heroes #3 (Sprout Recordings, 2009)
- American Heroes #4 (Sprout Recordings, 2014)
- Passions (Sprout Recordings, 2020)
- Innocence (Sprout Recordings, 2021)

Short films

- Ice - https://www.youtube.com/watch?v=KO61x3OeNeE
- Harmony - https://www.youtube.com/watch?v=s8j-FO1p9Qk
- Courage - https://www.youtube.com/watch?v=yw5SA-Q52JU
- Solar - https://www.youtube.com/watch?v=jXQeyQLtfv8
- Refuge - https://www.youtube.com/watch?v=6U4IbseXgLk
- Community - https://www.youtube.com/watch?v=tUgX-Gp6LKk
- Safe - https://www.youtube.com/watch?v=uTgkTL_fT1Q

The film Safe was showcased at the Beloit Film Festival.

- Happiness - https://www.youtube.com/watch?v=FlxRxjY7VJk
- Grace - https://www.youtube.com/watch?v=3DN7EhdRP3s
- Hope - https://www.youtube.com/watch?v=yeyUjoUaOkM
- Mountains - https://www.youtube.com/watch?v=iMexEIzqrVU
- Organic - https://www.youtube.com/watch?v=t1bUjghMysg
- Exceptional - https://www.youtube.com/watch?v=5hPwxhTMD4o
- Homeless - https://www.youtube.com/watch?v=6Jnk_9APy-k
- Organic - https://www.youtube.com/watch?v=t1bUjghMysg
- Natural - https://www.youtube.com/watch?v=7bYcVJQEMKM
- Adirondack - https://www.youtube.com/watch?v=DOmUCAEfEi4
- Wilderness - https://www.youtube.com/watch?v=WD387Mj4G40
- Vinyasa - https://www.youtube.com/watch?v=1ZI2W51WoIk
- Reverence - https://www.youtube.com/watch?v=drNqzu3nnvA
- Plastic - https://www.youtube.com/watch?v=ZISWmqnRqto
- Wind Energy: The Future, Now! - https://www.youtube.com/watch?v=L2efTtPH7ZQ
- Oceans - https://www.youtube.com/watch?v=oYtiTebwOmY
- Uplifters - https://www.youtube.com/watch?v=5ICRgjQsN1o
- Hunger - https://www.youtube.com/watch?v=aJRB8RjCFIs

The film Hunger was featured by the Warminster, PA Food Bank. Sprout is a volunteer at the food bank.
