= Barege =

Lightweight, sheer fabric matching a gauze

Barege (Barège) was a lightweight, sheer fabric matching a gauze. It was a union fabric made of silk and wool. Barege was a 19th-century fabric and originated from southwestern France. It takes its name from the town of Barèges but was mostly made in the town of Bagnères-de-Bigorre.

== Weave ==
Barege has silk warp and worsted weft. The cloth is weaved with leno weaving.

== Use ==
Barege was a thin translucent material suitable for veils and ladies' dresses.

== See also ==
- Balzarine a lightweight union cloth made of cotton and wool.
