= Balzarine =

Cotton and worsted fabric of the 19th century

Balzarine (Balzorine) was a cotton and worsted fabric of the 19th century. It was a lightweight union cloth made of cotton and wool.

== Characteristics and use ==
Balzarine was a thin and light woven texture meant for summer dresses for women. The cloth was produced as figured gauze on a Jaquard loom. The figured cloth was also called Balzarine brocade. Balzarine was very close to Barege.

=== Mourning cloth ===
Balzarine was used for mourning clothes.

== See also ==
- Crêpe (textile)
- Radzimir
