= Samuel Sloan House =

- U.S. National Register of Historic Places
- New Jersey Register of Historic Places
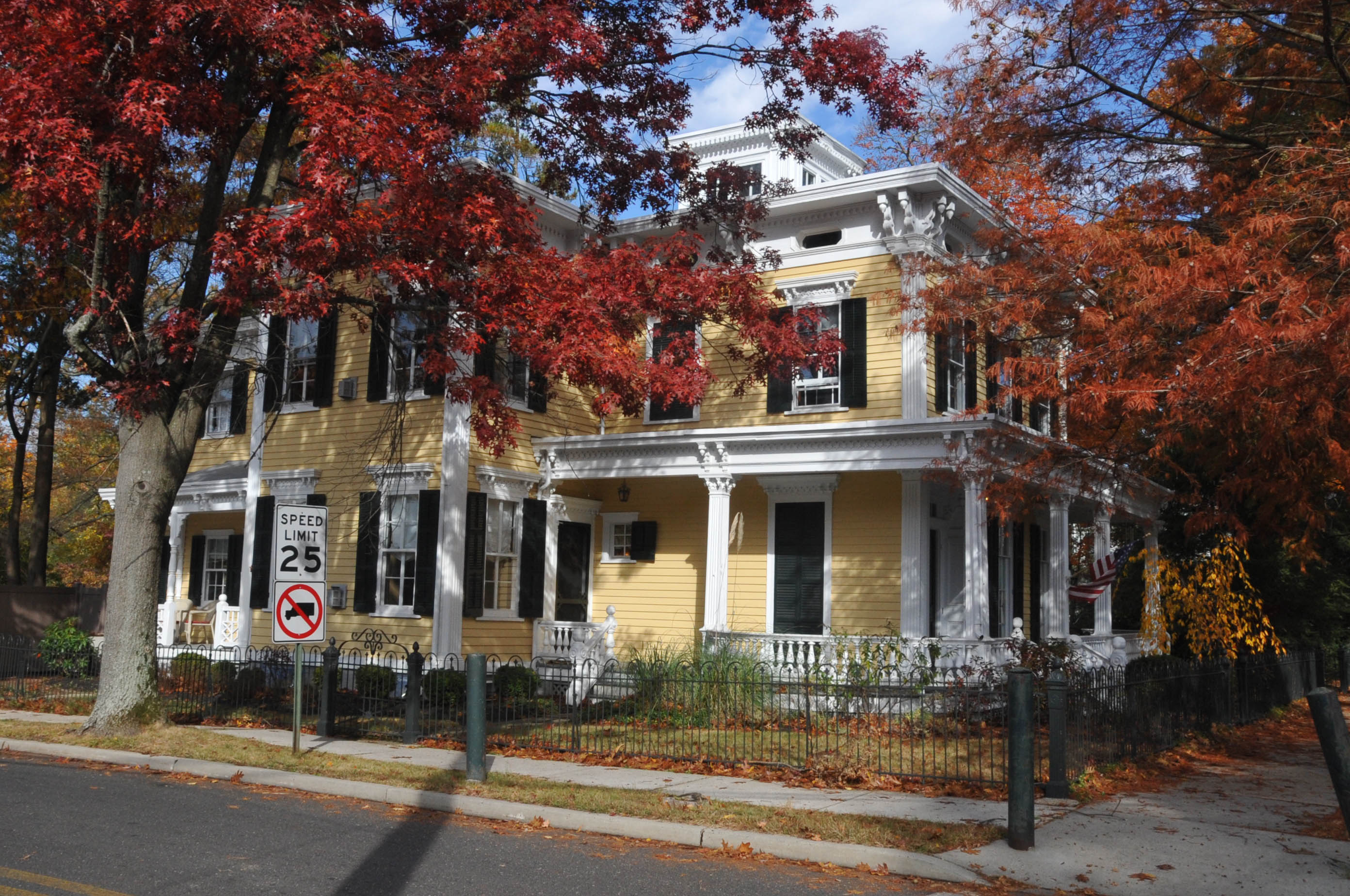

- Location within Mercer County, New Jersey Location within New Jersey Location within the United States
- Location: 238 South Main Street, Hightstown, New Jersey
- Coordinates: 40°15′57.8″N 74°31′30.6″W
- Area: less than 1 acre (0.40 ha)
- Built: 1856
- Architectural style: Carpenter Italianate
- NRHP reference No.: 74001168
- NJRHP No.: 3257

Significant dates
- Added to NRHP: September 28, 1974
- Designated NJRHP: September 6, 1973

The Samuel Sloan House is a historic antebellum home in Hightstown, New Jersey. It is considered the finest home from the early history of the town. Its architecture can be described as Carpenter Italianate, with the impressive massing associated with an Italian villa combined with fanciful jigsaw carpentry. The home was originally thought to have been designed by the architect, Samuel Sloan, as that name was found inscribed in a nineteenth century hand on a piece of millwork in the house. However, further research in 1997 established that the Samuel Sloan who built the home was in fact a local merchant and not the famed architect. It is currently a part of the Peddie School campus.

== See also ==
- National Register of Historic Places listings in Mercer County, New Jersey
