= Momie cloth =

Pebble-surfaced crêpe structure made of yarns

Momie cloth is a pebble-surfaced crêpe structure made of any natural or synthetic yarns. Momie crepe is a lightweight material made of cotton.

== Weave ==
Momie cloth is made by using cotton, rayon, or silk in warp and wool in weft. It is woven with granite weave, also called Momie weave, that forms a crepe texture. The weave is tight and interlaced and warp and weft, both visible on the face in the shape of small and irregular pebbles.

== Use ==
The cloth is used for dresses, curtains, and upholstery. In the 1880s black colored Momie cloth made of cotton, silk, and wool blend was used for mourning.

== See also ==
- Crêpe (textile)
- Epingline
