= Radzimir =

Silk material used for mourning attire

Radzimir (Radsimor, Redsimir) was a kind of silk serge, and It had been dyed black. Radzimir was an elegant silk material created particularly for mourning purposes. Radzimir was a fine, sturdy, and lustrous structure made of plain weave and ribbed weft. The name of the fabric is related to the French "Ras de Saint-Maur", which was a term used to designate a silk dress fabric from the 18th century. The fabric was entirely made of silk, silk, and fteuret (fine wool), or wool warp and silk in filling.

Radzimir was a fine a strong structure with a lustrous appearance constructed on plain weave, with ribbed weft.

== Ras de Saint Maur ==
During mourning, the Ras de Saint Maur held official status in the French courts. Variations like black wool and silk were used for official mourning, and there was another option of silk and wool for widows, etc.

== Recognition ==
In the mid-nineteenth century, Radzimir fabric was a popular material. It was worn by English women as part of their mourning evening dress.

=== Queen's silk ===
Queen Victoria was a patron of Radzimir. It is therefore known as 'Queen's Silk'.

== See also ==
- Balzarine
