= Crêpe (textile) =

Any of various fabrics with twisted threads, often crinkled surface

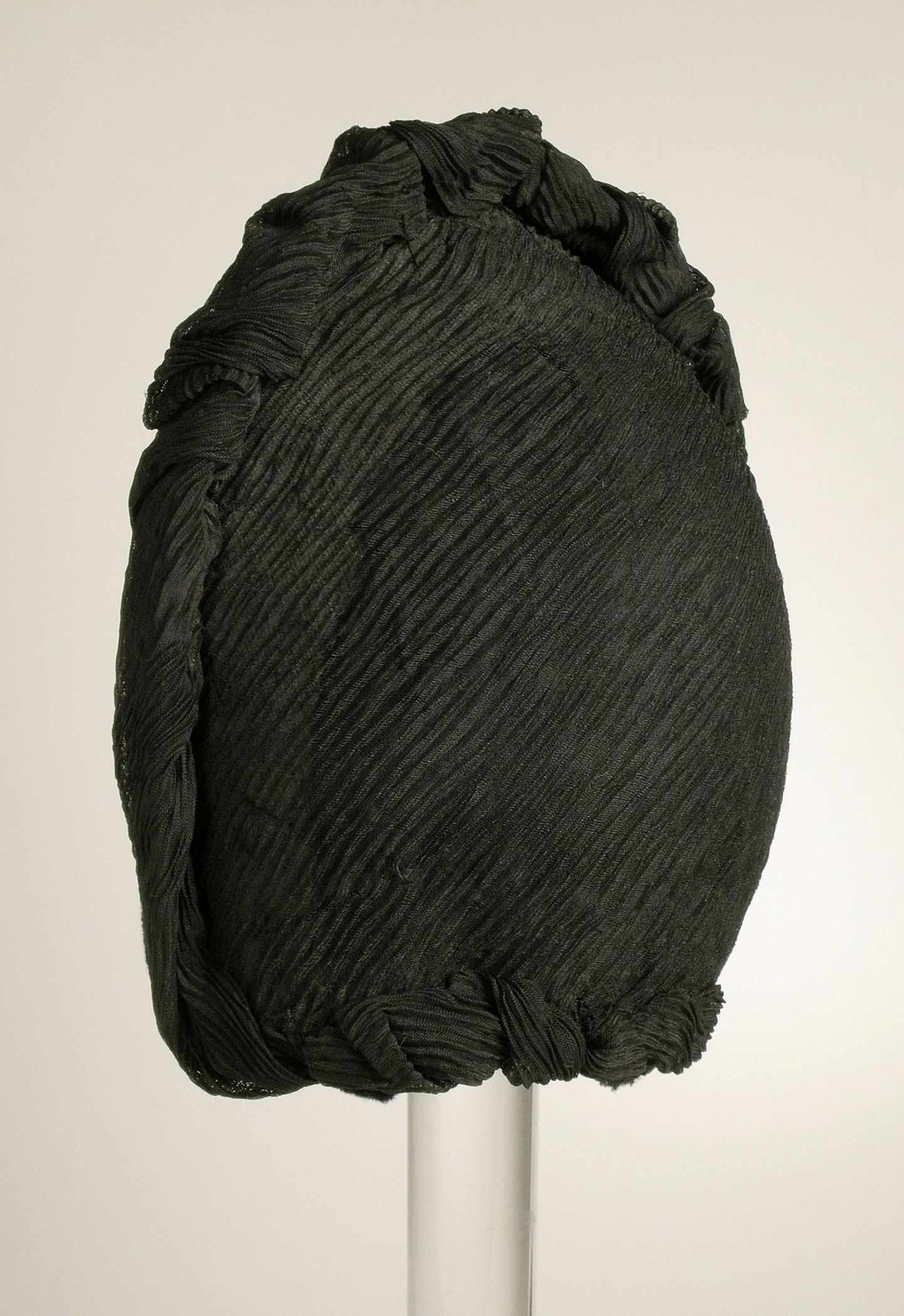
Woman's mourning bonnet in hard crape, c. 1880

Crêpe, also spelled crepe or crape (from the French crêpe), is a silk, wool, or synthetic fiber fabric with a distinctively crisp and crimped appearance. The term "crape" typically refers to a form of the fabric associated specifically with mourning. Crêpe was also historically called "crespe" or "crisp".

It is woven of hard-spun yarn, originally silk "in the gum" (silk from which the sericin had not been removed). There traditionally have been two distinct varieties of the crêpe: soft, Canton or Oriental crêpe, and hard or crisped crêpe.

== Types ==
=== A ===
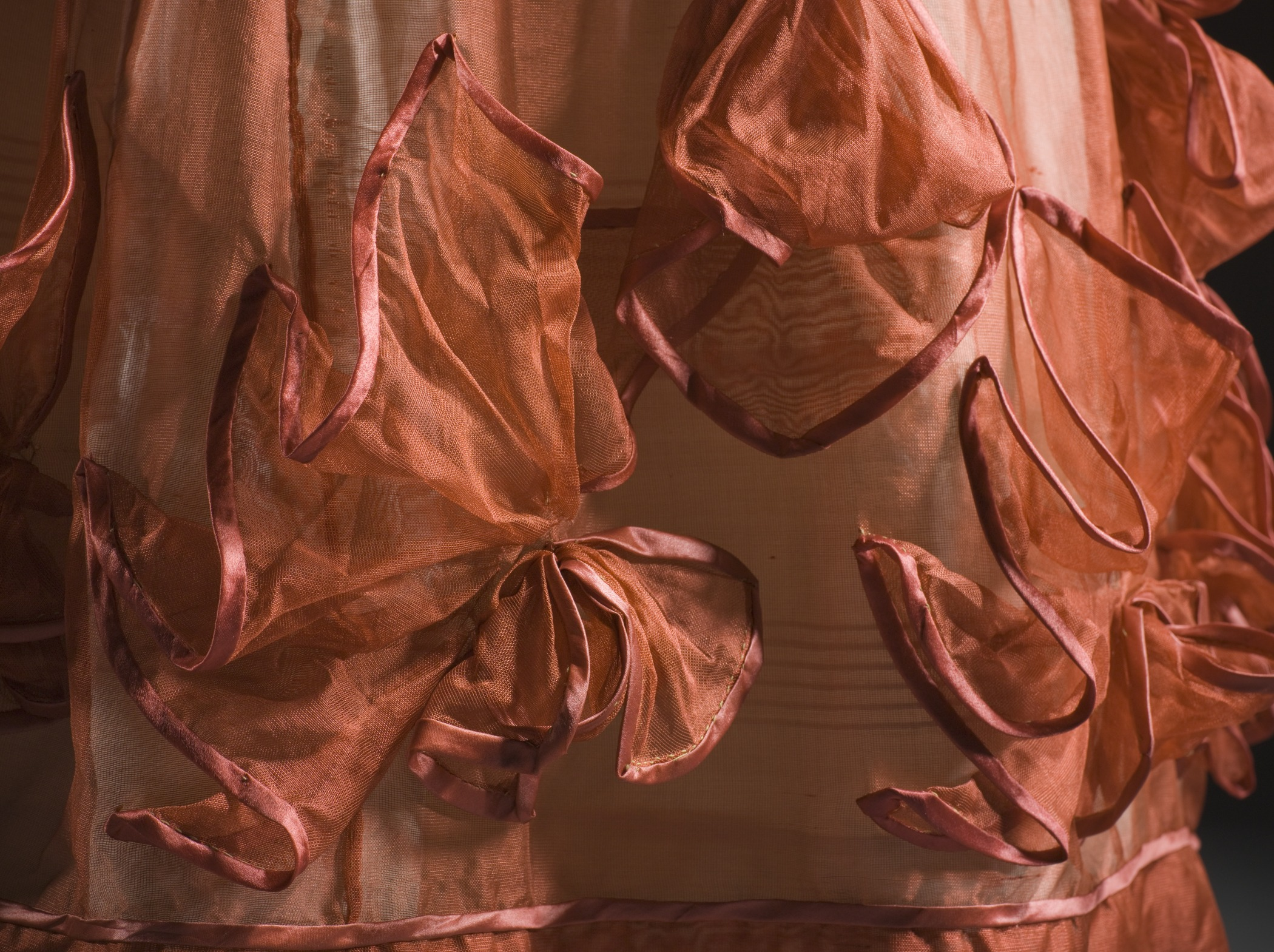
Detail of an aerophane dress, c. 1827

Aerophane
1. A crimped silk gauze with a crêpe texture.
2. A historic 19th century lightweight crêpe, introduced in 1820, and, as "crepe aerophane" in 1861.
Albert crêpe
1. A fine black silk mourning crêpe introduced in 1862.
2. Plain-weave crêpe.
3. An English-made silk and cotton blend crêpe.
Alicienne
A furnishing fabric with alternating plain weave and crêpe stripes.
Alpaca crêpe
Rayon and acetate blend crêpe with a woollen texture, not necessarily made of alpaca yarn.
Altesse
A British plain-weave silk fabric with crêpe filling.
Arabian
1. A British-made plain-weave cloth with figured crêpe designs.
2. Piece-dyed silk crêpe embroidered with dots.
Armure
(See Georgian crêpe)

=== B ===
Balanced crêpe
Crêpe woven with alternating S and Z twist yarns in both directions.
Balmoral crape
An 1895 English crape.
Balzerine
An 1889 narrow-striped silk grenadine overlaid with wider crêpe stripes. An earlier 1830s cotton/worsted fabric, spelled balzarine, was probably not crêpe.
Bark (or tree-bark) crêpe
A broad term describing rough crêpes with a bark texture.
Bauté satin
Warp-woven satin with a plain crêpe reverse.
Borada crape
A cheaper, economical version of mourning crape advertised in 1887.
Bologna crêpe
Silk crêpe used for mourning, also known as valle cypre.

=== C ===
Canton crêpe
A soft silk crêpe with a pebbly surface originally associated with Canton in China, with bias ribs. Made in Britain, but exported to China, hence its name.
Caustic soda crêpe
Cotton treated with chemicals to create a crêpe-like texture, often in patterns.
Chiffon crêpe
Chiffon-weight crêpe.
Chijimi
Japanese crêpe.

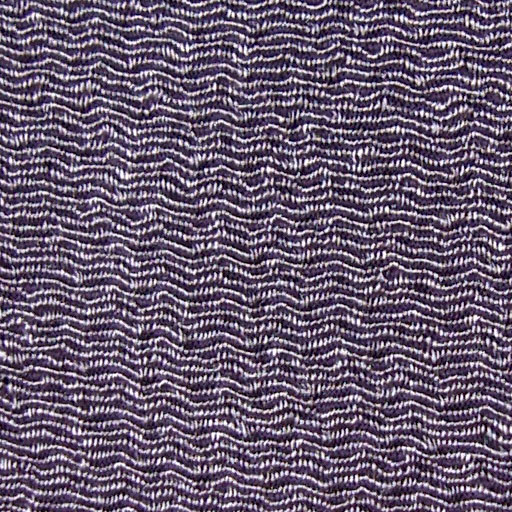
Chirimen

Chirimen
Japanese raw silk crêpe widely used to make kimono. When woven with a dot it is mon-chirimen.
Courtauld crape
1890s mourning crape made by Courtaulds. An 1894 variation, called 'Courtauld's new silk crêpe', was exceptionally thin and soft. Courtaulds monopolised the export market for English crapes and crêpes, meaning that the textiles known as "crape anglaise" were almost always manufactured by Courtaulds up until 1940.
Crêpe Algerian
A trade name for a printed pongee with a rough crêpe texture.
Crêpe anglaise
A French term for English mourning crapes in black and white. The only true 'crape anglais' was considered that made by Courtaulds (see Courtauld crape) which was last made in 1940.
Crêpe Beatrice
Trade name for crêpe with a light warp stripe.
Crêpe berber
Trade name for a piece-dyed crepe-textured pongee.
Crêpe charmeuse
Lightweight silk satin with a grenadine warp and crêpe reverse.
Crêpe chenette
A tradename for a strong crêpe with a pebble texture.
Crêpe crêpe
Made with extra twists in the warp to create an extra-deep texture.

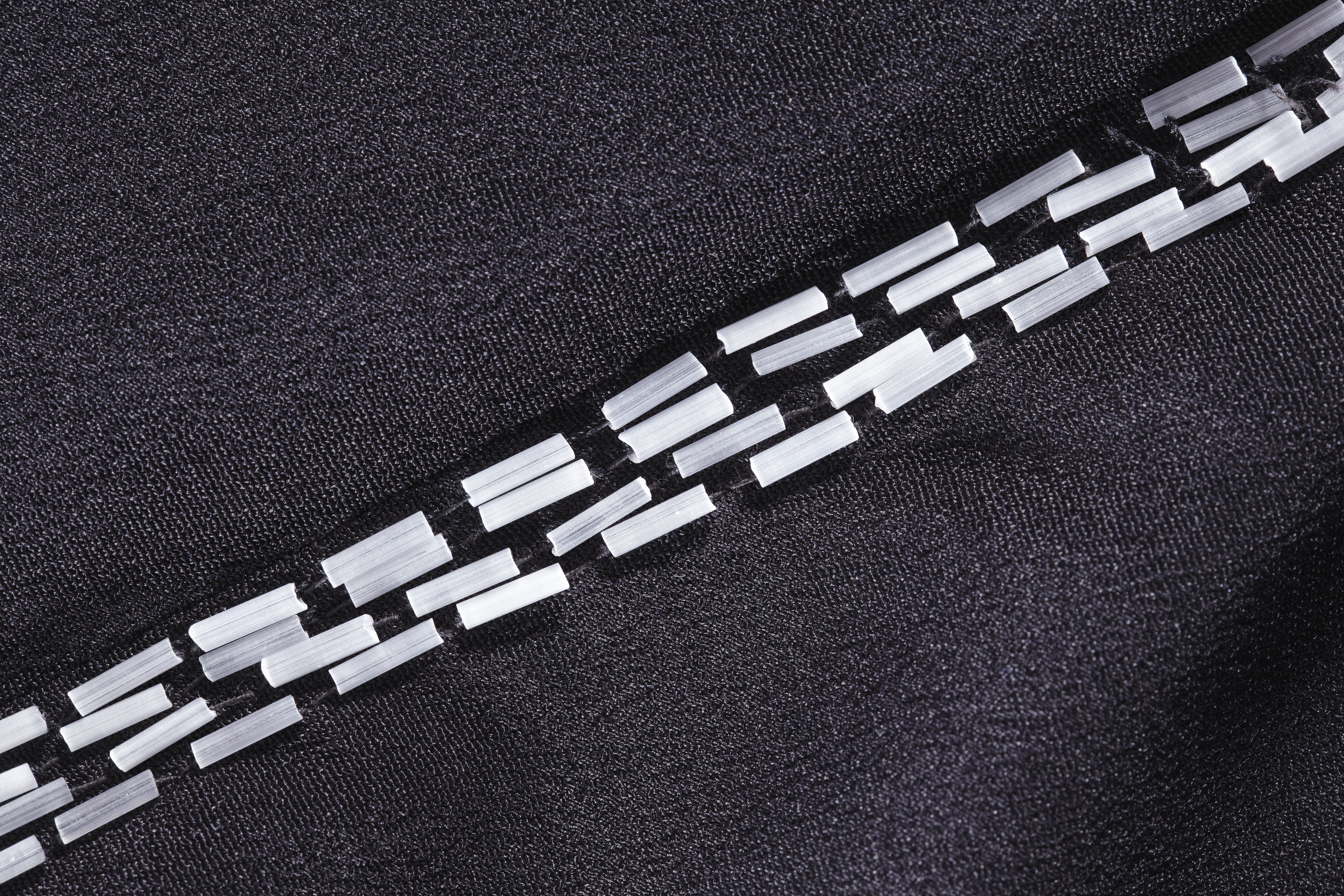
Crepe de chine

Crêpe de chine
A fine, lightweight silk, cotton, or worsted, with a plain weave and crêpe-twist filling.
Crêpe de chine travers
A ribbed crêpe de chine with heavier filling yarns introduced to the weave at regular intervals.
Crêpe de dante
Crêpe with silk and wool filling.
Crêpe de lahor
Cotton crêpe made in France.
Crêpe de laine
A sheer wool fabric plain-woven with hard twist for a slight crêpe effect.
Crêpe de santé
An undyed, closely woven, rough-textured wool-blend crêpe mixed with silk, linen, or cotton, also called "health crepe".
Crêpe de Suisse
1860 dress fabric.
Crêpe d'espagne
Open-weave fabric with a silk warp and wool filling.
Crêpe diana
Trade name for a cotton and silk blend crêpe.
Crêpe Elizabeth
English term for a mottled or pebbled georgette.
Crêpe faille sublime
Silk grosgrain with a hard-twist filling.
Crêpe flannel
Plain-woven worsted with a crêpe finish.
Crêpe imperial
Late 19th century woollen crape.
Crêpe jacquard
Crepe with designs produced by jacquard weaving.
Crêpe janigor
Trade name for a heavy rib textile with alternating rayon and dull acetate warp threads, cross-dyed for varied shades.
Crêpe jersey
Vertically ribbed silk crêpe resembling the knit fabric.
Crêpe lissé (or lease)
A lightweight, lustrous, slightly stiffened open-weave silk or cotton crêpe, with fewer twists than a crêpe crêpe.
Crêpela
French term for a crêpe effect.
Crepeline
Very sheer plain-woven silk usually used in textile conservation. Originally introduced in the 1870s as a cheap alternative to crepe de chine.
Crêpella
Plain-woven worsted using hard-spun yarn.
Crêpe maretz
An 1862 fabric.
Crêpe marocain
Heavy, cross-ribbed crêpe where the filling yarn is coarser than the warp, resembling a canton crêpe.
Crêpe meteor
Soft silk crêpe, twill weave reversing to satin.
Crêpe mohair
Silk and mohair blend crêpe.
Crêpe morette
Trade name. Lightweight worsted crêpe with heavier, looser filling.
Crêpe mosseux
A type of opaque voile which resists shrinkage.
Crêpe myosotis
A later mourning crêpe made in the 1930s, in crimped silk with a soft finish. Courtaulds launched this textile in the early 1930s as an alternative to the increasingly unpopular traditional stiff mourning crapes.
Crepenette
Crêpe-effect pongee.
Crêpe ondese
Rough textured rayon-acetate blend crêpe.
Crêpe poplin
A late 19th century silk-wool rib fabric with crêpe effect.
Crêpe rachel
French print cotton-worsted blend crêpe.
Crêpe radio
British raw silk crêpe with a ribbed effect, using alternate double rows of S-twist and Z-twist.
Crêpe royal
Sheer crêpe-de-chine introduced in 1889.
Crêpe suzette
A variation on crepon georgette.
Crepine
Silk with crêpe dots. The name also describes a type of fringe.
Crepoline
A class of transparent fabrics with a warp-wise crêpe effect.
Crepon
A heavier crêpe with an exaggerated warp-directional texture produced by several weaving techniques. A soft silky version was introduced in 1866, and the second, much heavier version in 1882. In the 1890s crepon also described a woollen fabric that puffed between stripes or squares, including crepon milleraye (striped) and crepon Persian (with 'Oriental patterns').
Crystal crêpe
An English term for silk crêpe.
Crespe
Lightweight crimped mourning gauze, late 16th century.
Cynara
An crêpe-type fabric in rayon and acetate.
Cyprus
Fine crêpe used for mourning hatbands in the 15th-17th centuries, made in Cyprus.

=== E ===
ʻeleʻele kanikau
Black mourning crêpe worn in Hawaii.
Epingline
Textile in silk, rayon or worsted with a crêpe surface.
Esmeralda or étendelle
Sheer white crêpe or gauze popular in the early 19th century, often embroidered.

=== F ===
Flat crêpe
Also called mock crepe or (inaccurately) French crepe. A smooth, flat plain-weave fabric, typically a silk blend, with hard-twisted yarns and ordinary yarn warp. Also used to describe a similar fabric made without crepe-twist yarns.
French crêpe
1. An inaccurately-applied name for flat crêpe.
2. Plain-weave light silk or rayon cloths similar to flat crêpe.
3. A lingerie weight fabric with ordinary yarn warp and a twisted filling yarn that is less twisted than typical crepe twist.

=== G ===
Gamsa
An imitation satin-backed crêpe in twill weave rayon.

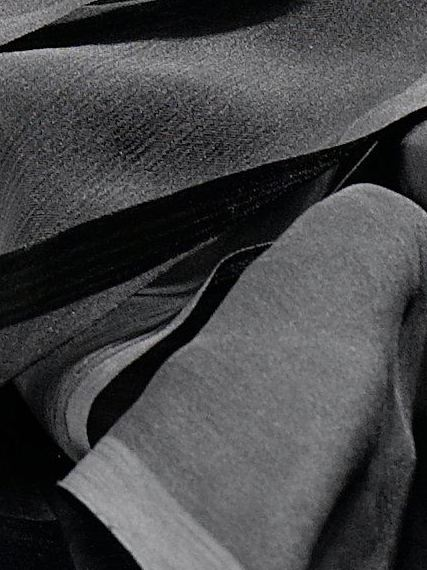
Georgette

Georgette
1. Sheer, lightweight fabric named after the couturiere Georgette de la Plante.
2. A crepe-surfaced plain weave silk or synthetic fabric with alternating S and Z twist yarns in both warp and weft.
3. An English term for cotton crepe.
Georgian crêpe
A chain-pebbled crêpe (called armure in France) often with diamond, shield or bird's-eye motifs.

=== H ===
Health crêpe
See crêpe de santé.

=== L ===
Lingerie crêpe
See French crêpe.

=== M ===
Marana
Woollen crepe, very resilient and drapable.
Mock crêpe
See flat crêpe.
Momie crêpe
Light cotton fabric.
Moss crepe
See sand crepe.

=== N ===
Norwich crêpe or crape
1. 19th century silk warp and worsted, resembling a non-twill bombazine but not considered true crêpe.
2. 17th century black-dyed worsted crêpe made in England.
3. A georgette-like silk and cotton blend fabric in a crêpe weave.

=== P ===
Pekin crêpe
Pekin (shiny and matte striped textile) woven with a crêpe weft.
Plissé
Mainly cotton fabric with a crêpe effect created by chemically treating the fabric to pucker and crinkle, typically in stripes. Plissé satin is made using crêpe yarns.

=== R ===
Reverse crêpe
Woven with a crêpe yarn warp and flat filling.
Rhythm crêpe
Plain-weave rayon with seersucker stripe.
Romaine
Heavy but transparent crêpe.
Roshanara
Trade name for heavily ribbed satin-backed crepe.
Russian crêpe
Invented in 1881. A coarse-weave crêpe.

=== S ===
Sand crepe or moss crepe
Crêpe with a grained or frosted surface appearance, created with a small dobby weave.
Sawdust crêpe
Similar to sand crêpe but with a harsher surface.

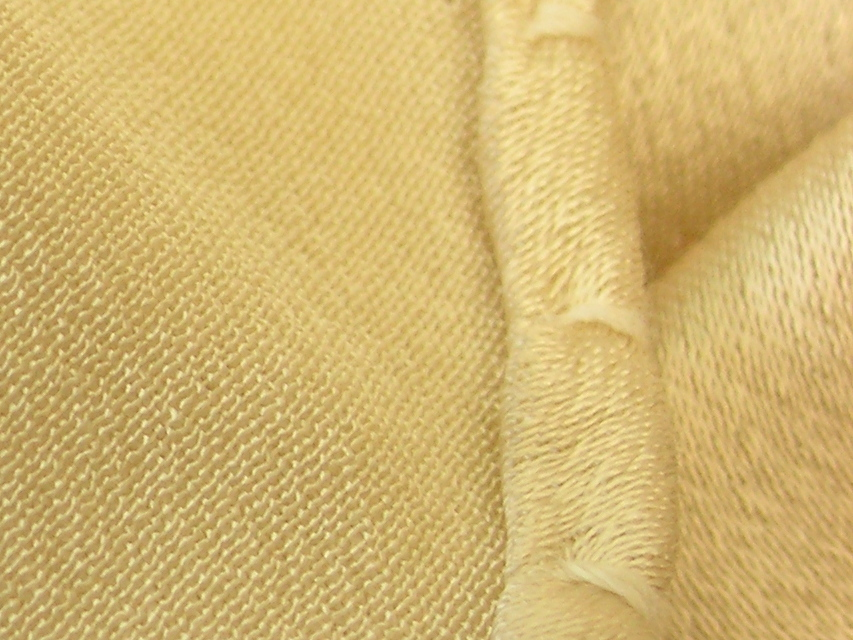
Satin-back crepe

Satin-back crêpe
Reversible fabric with a satin face and a crêpe reverse.
Shioze
Japanese spun-silk crêpe.
Spanish crêpe
See Crepe d'espagne.

=== V ===
Victoria crepe
British-made cotton crêpe with a high luster.

=== Y ===
Yantsou
Figured silk crêpe made in Yantai, Eastern China.
Yeddo crêpe
Soft cotton fabric, medium weight.

== See also ==
- Crêpe paper, paper with similar texture
- Momie cloth

== Bibliography ==
- Ikegami, Eiko (2005). Bonds of civility : aesthetic networks and political origins of Japanese culture (Reprinted ed.). Cambridge: Cambridge University Press. ISBN 9780521601153.
- Lewandowski, Elizabeth J. (2011). The complete costume dictionary. Lanham, Md.: Scarecrow Press, Inc. ISBN 9780810877856.
- Panda, H. (2010). The complete book on textile processing and silk reeling technology (First ed.). Delhi: Asia Pacific Business Press, Inc. ISBN 9788178331355.
- Taylor, Lou (2009) [1983]. "Appendix 1: A Selection of Popular Mourning Fabrics". Mourning Dress: A Costume and Social History (2009 ed.). Routledge Revivals. pp. 246–253. ISBN 978-1135228439.
- Tortora, Phyllis G.; Johnson, Ingrid (2014). The Fairchild books dictionary of textiles (8th ed.). New York: Fairchild Books. ISBN 9781609015350.
