= Hightstown, New Jersey =

Borough in Mercer County, New Jersey, US

- Borough
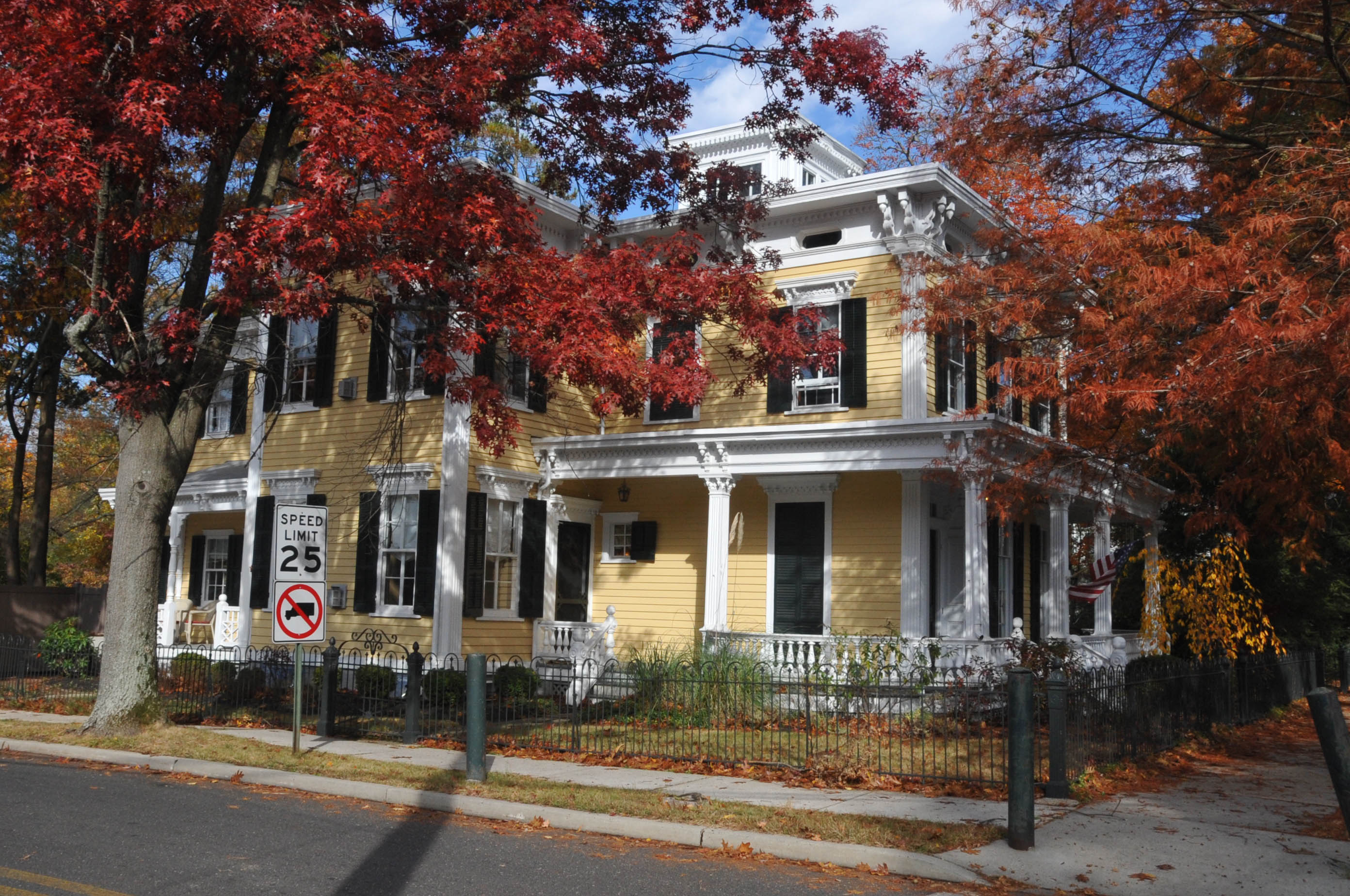
- Samuel Sloan House on South Main Street

- Seal

- Location of Hightstown in Mercer County highlighted in red (right). Inset map: Location of Mercer County in New Jersey highlighted in orange (left).

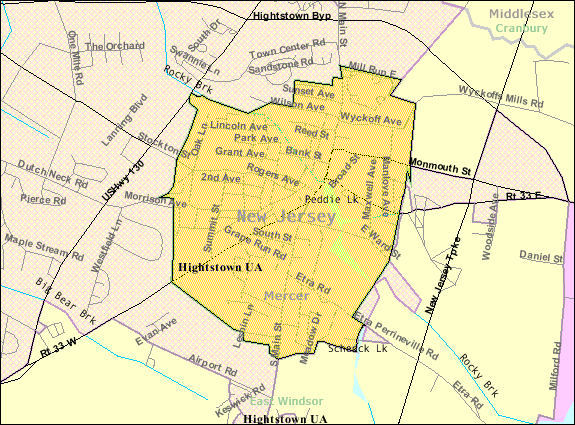
- Census Bureau map of Hightstown, New Jersey
- Interactive map of Hightstown, New Jersey
- Location in Mercer County Location in New Jersey Location in the United States
- Coordinates: 40.268457°N 74.525804°W
- Country: United States
- State: New Jersey
- County: Mercer
- Incorporated: March 5, 1853
- Named for: Hight family

Government
  - Type: Borough
  - Body: Borough Council
  - Mayor: Susan Bluth (D, term ends December 31, 2026)
  - Administrator: Dimitri Musing
  - Municipal clerk: Peggy Riggio

Area
  - Total: 1.27 sq mi (3.28 km^{2})
  - Land: 1.23 sq mi (3.19 km^{2})
  - Water: 0.035 sq mi (0.09 km^{2}) 2.60%
  - Rank: 478th of 565 in state 10th of 12 in county
- Elevation: 92 ft (28 m)

Population (2020)
  - Total: 5,900
  - Estimate (2023): 5,853
  - Rank: 352nd of 565 in state 10th of 12 in county
  - Density: 4,785.1/sq mi (1,847.5/km^{2})
  - Rank: 119th of 565 in state 2nd of 12 in county
- Time zone: UTC−05:00 (Eastern (EST))
  - Summer (DST): UTC−04:00 (Eastern (EDT))
- ZIP Code: 08520
- Area code: 609
- FIPS code: 3402131620
- GNIS feature ID: 0885254
- Website: www.hightstownborough.com

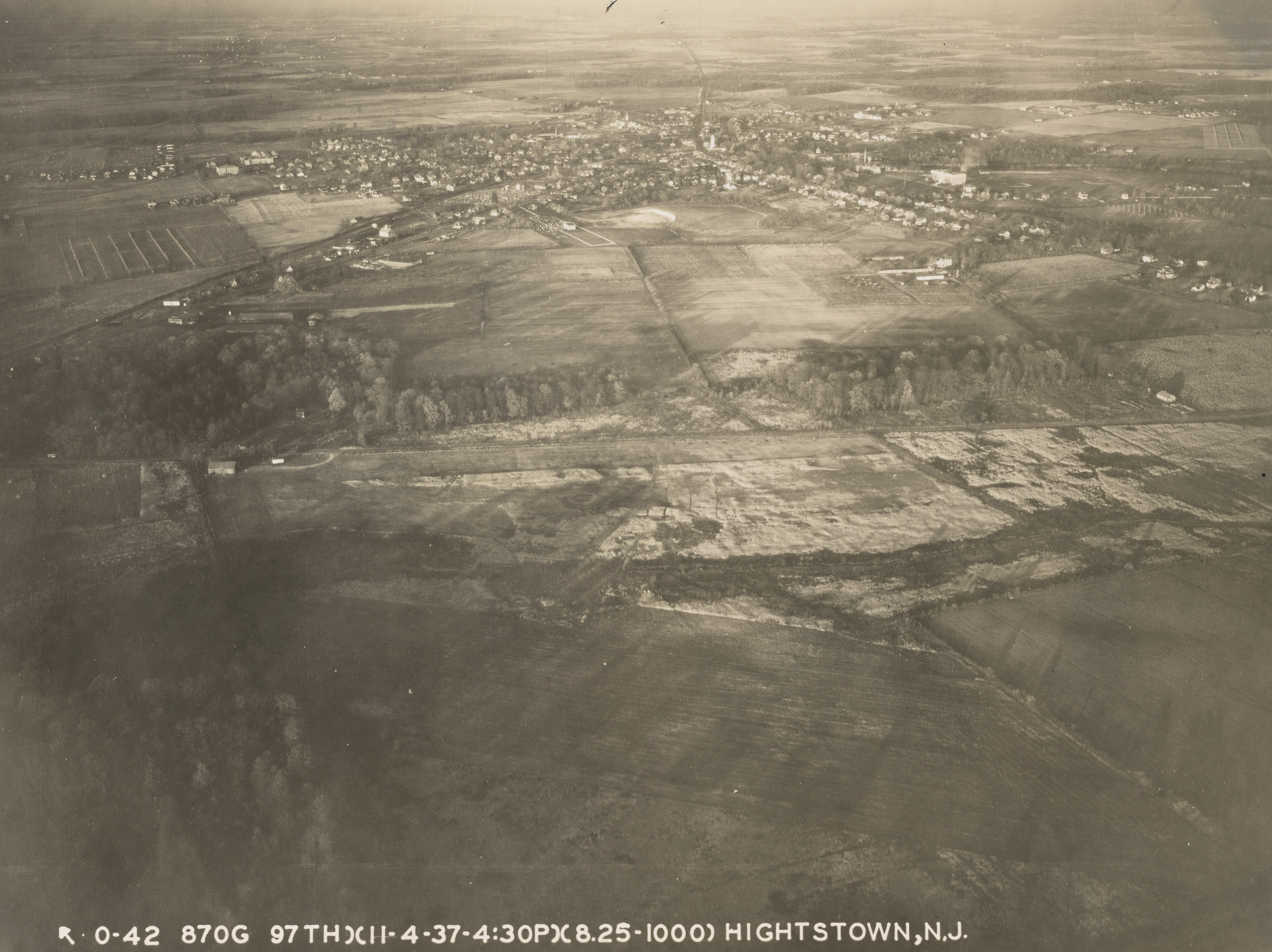
Aerial view of Hightstown in 1938

Hightstown is a borough in Mercer County, in the U.S. state of New Jersey. Nestled within the Raritan Valley region, Hightstown is an historic, commercial, and cultural hub of Central New Jersey, along with being a diverse outer-ring commuter suburb of New York City in the New York Metropolitan Area. As of the 2020 United States census, the borough's population was 5,900, its highest decennial count ever and an increase of 406 (+7.4%) from the 5,494 recorded at the 2010 census, which in turn reflected an increase of 278 (+5.3%) from the 5,216 counted in the 2000 census.

Hightstown was incorporated as a borough by an act of the New Jersey Legislature on March 5, 1853, within portions of East Windsor Township. The borough became fully independent around 1894. Additional portions of East Windsor Township were annexed in 1913, 1915, and 1927. The traditional explanation is that the borough was named for John and Mary Hight, who established a tavern in the area in the 1750s.

== Geography ==
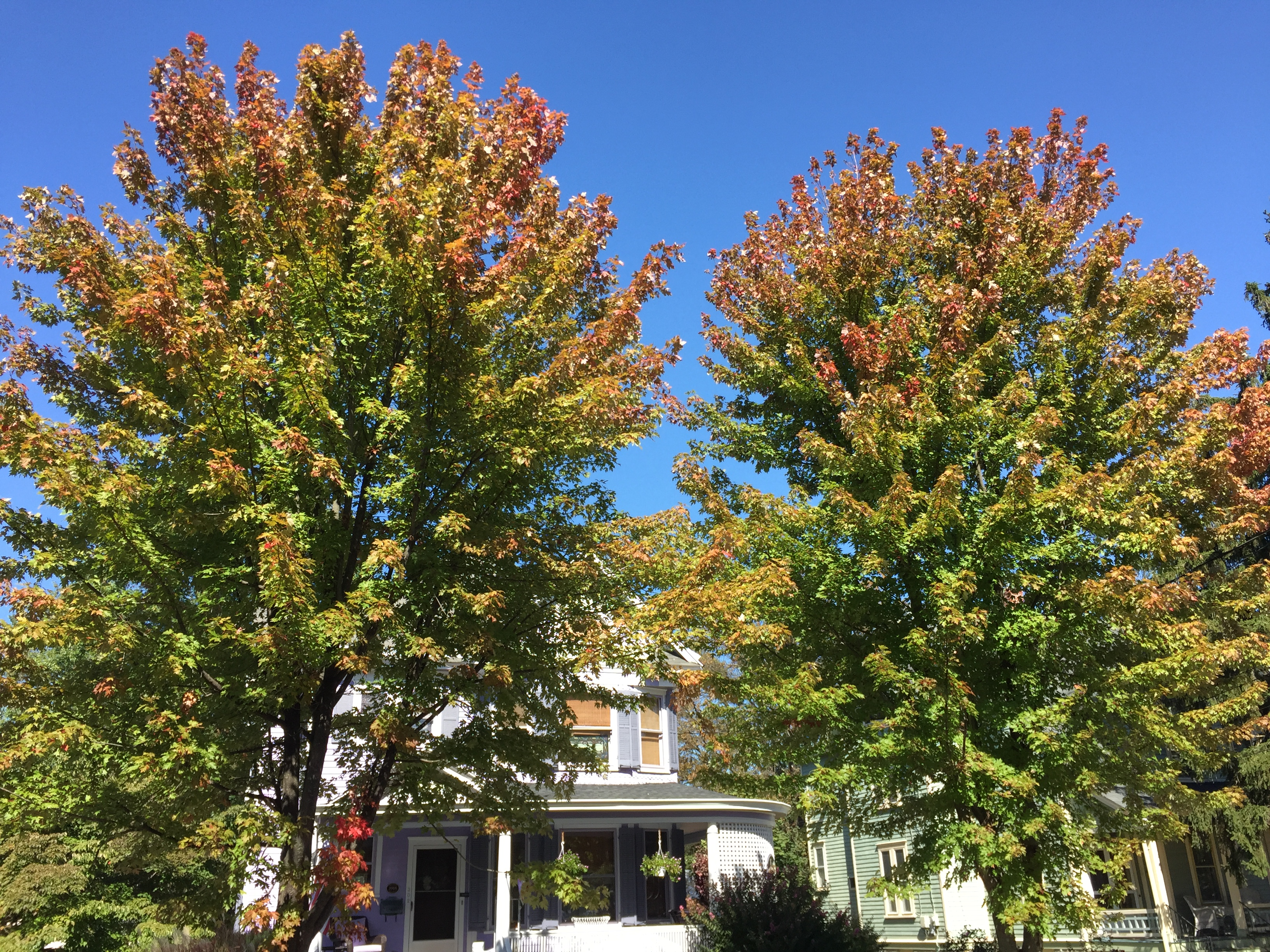
Freeman's maples in early autumn on a residential street in Hightstown

According to the United States Census Bureau, the borough had a total area of 1.27 square miles (3.28 km^{2}), including 1.23 square miles (3.19 km^{2}) of land and 0.03 square miles (0.09 km^{2}) of water (2.60%).

The borough is an independent municipality surrounded entirely by East Windsor, making it part one of 21 pairs of "doughnut towns" in the state, where one municipality entirely surrounds another.

Hightstown is at the central-most point of New Jersey and is roughly equidistant from Philadelphia and New York City.

== Demographics ==
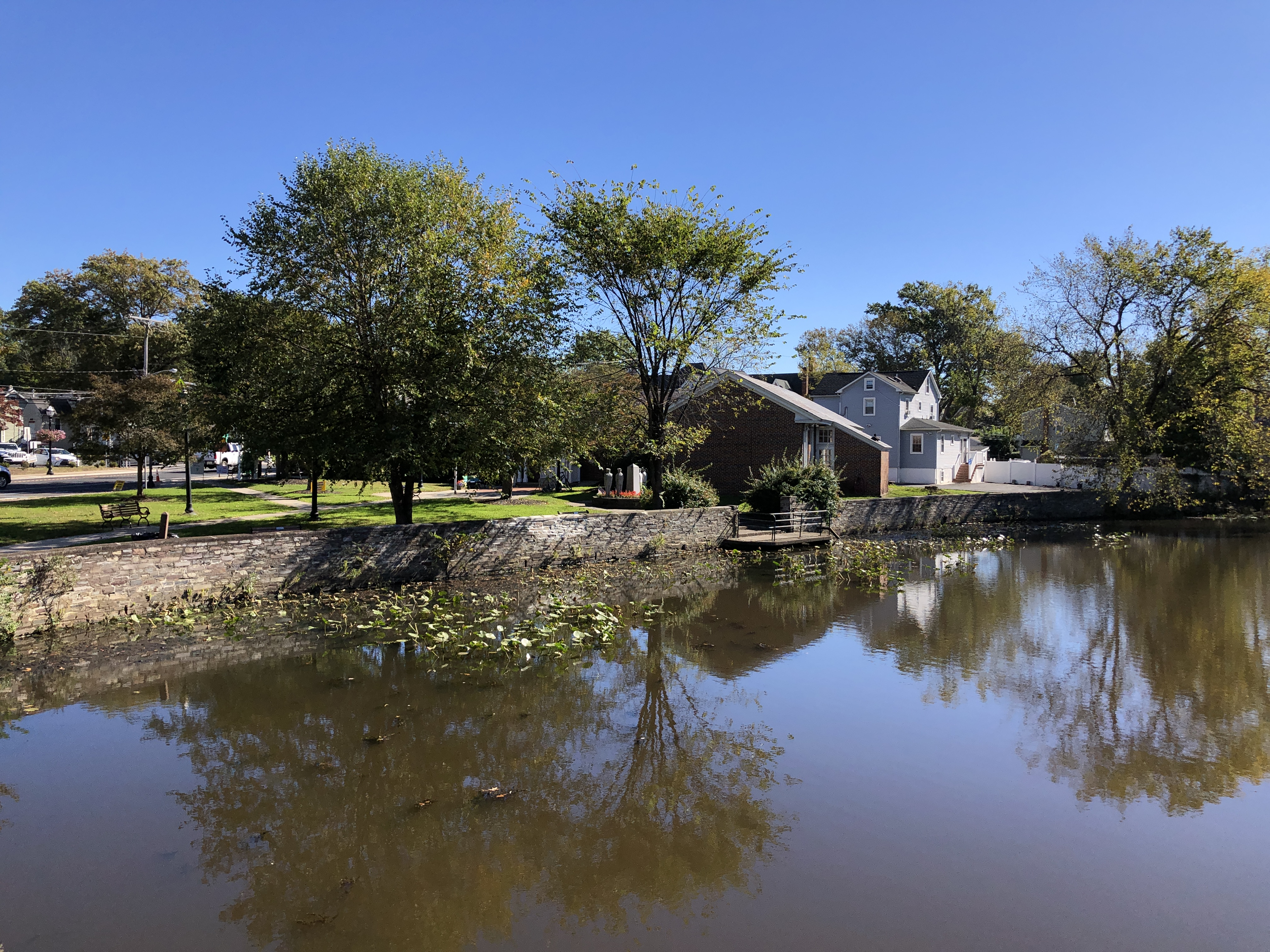
Residences along Peddie Lake

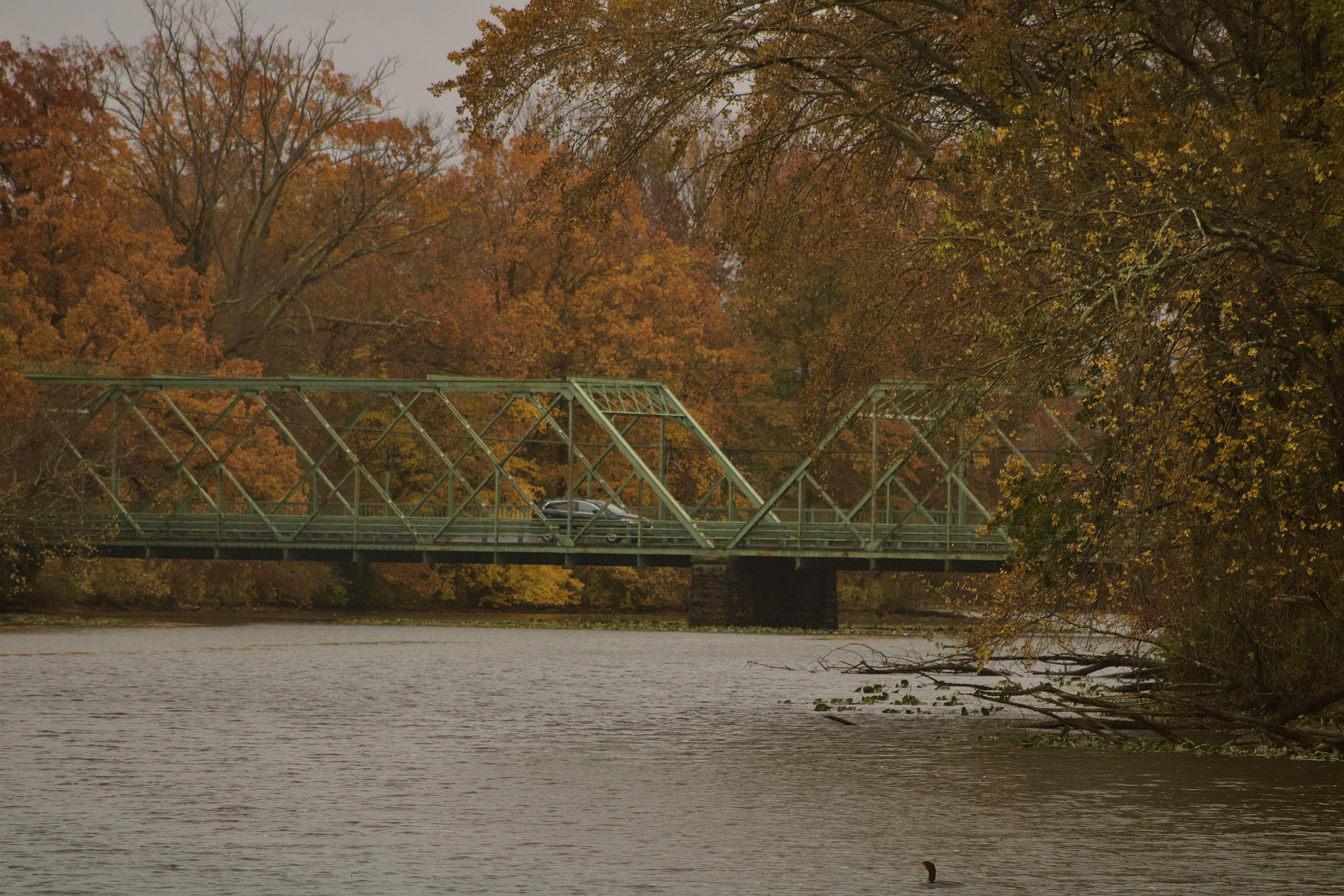
Narrow bridge over Peddie Lake

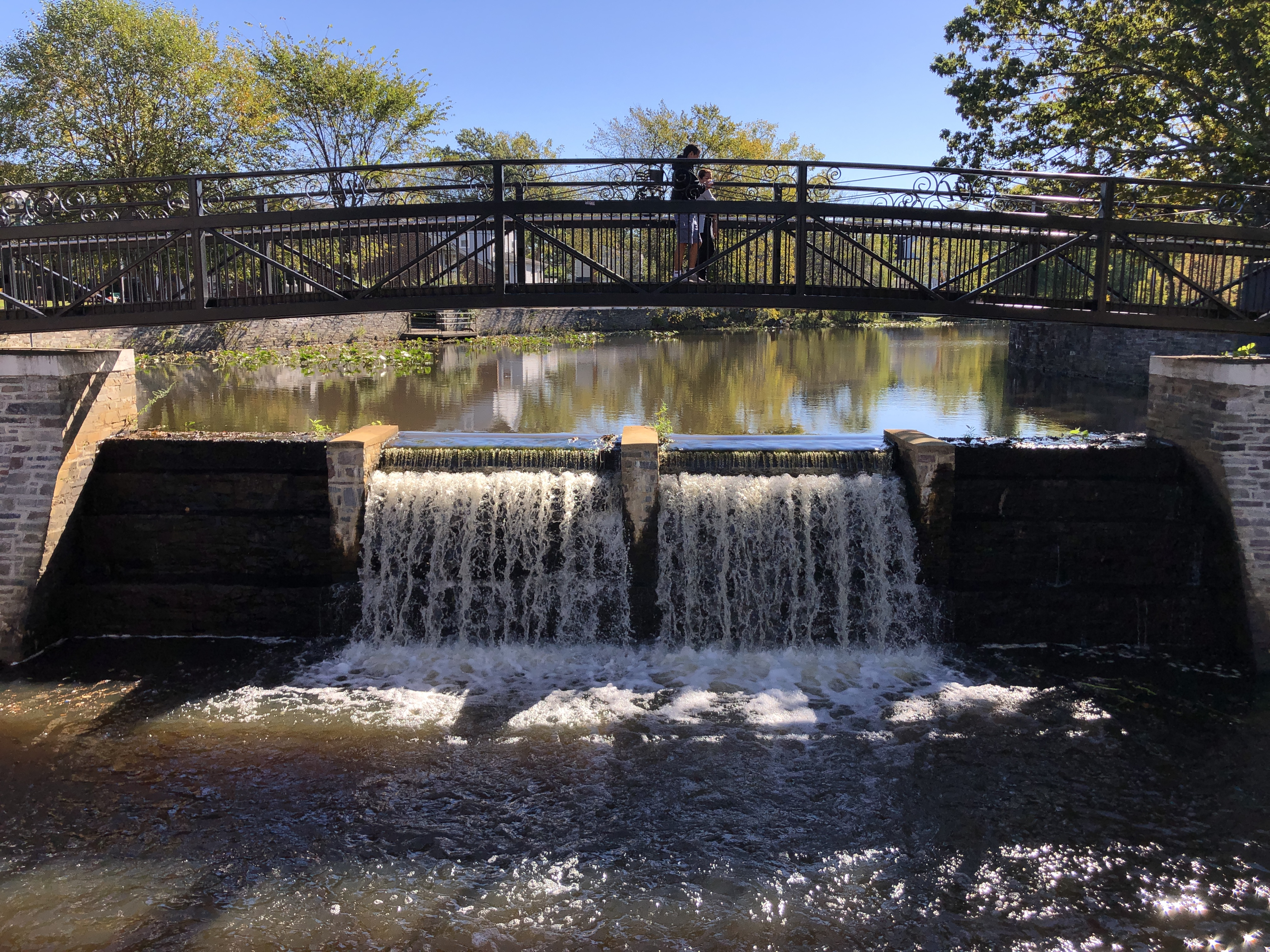
Spillway from Peddie Lake

Historical population
Census	Pop.	Note	%±
1860	970		—
1870	1,347		38.9%
1880	1,355		0.6%
1890	1,875		38.4%
1900	1,749		−6.7%
1910	1,879		7.4%
1920	2,674		42.3%
1930	3,012		12.6%
1940	3,486		15.7%
1950	3,712		6.5%
1960	4,317		16.3%
1970	5,431		25.8%
1980	4,581		−15.7%
1990	5,126		11.9%
2000	5,216		1.8%
2010	5,494		5.3%
2020	5,900		7.4%
2023 (est.)	5,853	▼	−0.8%
Population sources:1860–1920 1870 1880–1890; 1890–1910 1910–1930; 1940–2000 2000; 2010 2020

=== 2020 census ===
As of the 2020 census, Hightstown had a population of 5,900. The median age was 37.8 years. 22.8% of residents were under the age of 18 and 14.0% of residents were 65 years of age or older. For every 100 females there were 97.3 males, and for every 100 females age 18 and over there were 95.5 males age 18 and over.

100.0% of residents lived in urban areas, while 0.0% lived in rural areas.

There were 2,097 households in Hightstown, of which 35.6% had children under the age of 18 living in them. Of all households, 48.1% were married-couple households, 17.7% were households with a male householder and no spouse or partner present, and 27.0% were households with a female householder and no spouse or partner present. About 24.8% of all households were made up of individuals and 11.2% had someone living alone who was 65 years of age or older.

There were 2,216 housing units, of which 5.4% were vacant. The homeowner vacancy rate was 0.8% and the rental vacancy rate was 6.0%.

Racial composition as of the 2020 census
Race	Number	Percent
White	2,928	49.6%
Black or African American	424	7.2%
American Indian and Alaska Native	57	1.0%
Asian	338	5.7%
Native Hawaiian and Other Pacific Islander	4	0.1%
Some other race	1,410	23.9%
Two or more races	739	12.5%
Hispanic or Latino (of any race)	2,166	36.7%

=== 2010 census ===
The 2010 United States census counted 5,494 people, 1,976 households, and 1,352 families in the borough. The population density was 4,536.0 per square mile (1,751.4/km^{2}). There were 2,108 housing units at an average density of 1,740.4 per square mile (672.0/km^{2}). The racial makeup was 69.44% (3,815) White, 8.05% (442) Black or African American, 0.56% (31) Native American, 4.08% (224) Asian, 0.15% (8) Pacific Islander, 13.56% (745) from other races, and 4.17% (229) from two or more races. Hispanic or Latino of any race were 30.29% (1,664) of the population.

Of the 1,976 households, 32.0% had children under the age of 18; 51.2% were married couples living together; 11.2% had a female householder with no husband present and 31.6% were non-families. Of all households, 24.6% were made up of individuals and 6.7% had someone living alone who was 65 years of age or older. The average household size was 2.73 and the average family size was 3.23.

23.9% of the population were under the age of 18, 8.6% from 18 to 24, 31.1% from 25 to 44, 26.7% from 45 to 64, and 9.6% who were 65 years of age or older. The median age was 36.9 years. For every 100 females, the population had 99.5 males. For every 100 females ages 18 and older there were 100.1 males.

The Census Bureau's 2006–2010 American Community Survey showed that (in 2010 inflation-adjusted dollars) median household income was $66,250 (with a margin of error of ± $8,281) and the median family income was $72,583 (± $13,355). Males had a median income of $49,861 (± $9,561) versus $42,361 (± $14,837) for females. The per capita income for the borough was $32,976 (± $3,402). About 8.2% of families and 8.7% of the population were below the poverty line, including 17.2% of those under age 18 and 1.1% of those age 65 or over.

=== 2000 census ===
As of the 2000 United States census there were 5,216 people, 2,001 households, and 1,300 families residing in the borough. The population density was 4,251.9 inhabitants per square mile (1,641.7/km^{2}). There were 2,081 housing units at an average density of 1,696.4 per square mile (655.0/km^{2}). The racial makeup of the borough was 76.53% White, 8.51% African American, 0.36% Native American, 2.28% Asian, 0.08% Pacific Islander, 9.64% from other races, and 2.59% from two or more races. Hispanic or Latino of any race were 20.05% of the population.

There were 2,001 households, out of which 30.3% had children under the age of 18 living with them, 51.7% were married couples living together, 8.5% had a female householder with no husband present, and 35.0% were non-families. 27.9% of all households were made up of individuals, and 9.6% had someone living alone who was 65 years of age or older. The average household size was 2.60 and the average family size was 3.15.

In the borough the population was spread out, with 22.5% under the age of 18, 8.0% from 18 to 24, 36.8% from 25 to 44, 21.9% from 45 to 64, and 10.8% who were 65 years of age or older. The median age was 36 years. For every 100 females, there were 103.4 males. For every 100 females age 18 and over, there were 101.2 males.

The median income for a household in the borough was $64,299, and the median income for a family was $72,092. Males had a median income of $46,375 versus $35,428 for females. The per capita income for the borough was $28,605. About 4.3% of families and 7.3% of the population were below the poverty line, including 9.1% of those under age 18 and 4.4% of those age 65 or over.

As of the 2000 Census, 6.31% of Hightstown's residents identified themselves as being of Ecuadorian ancestry, which was the second highest of any municipality in New Jersey and the sixth highest percentage of Ecuadorian people in any place in the United States with 1,000 or more residents identifying their ancestry.

== Economy ==
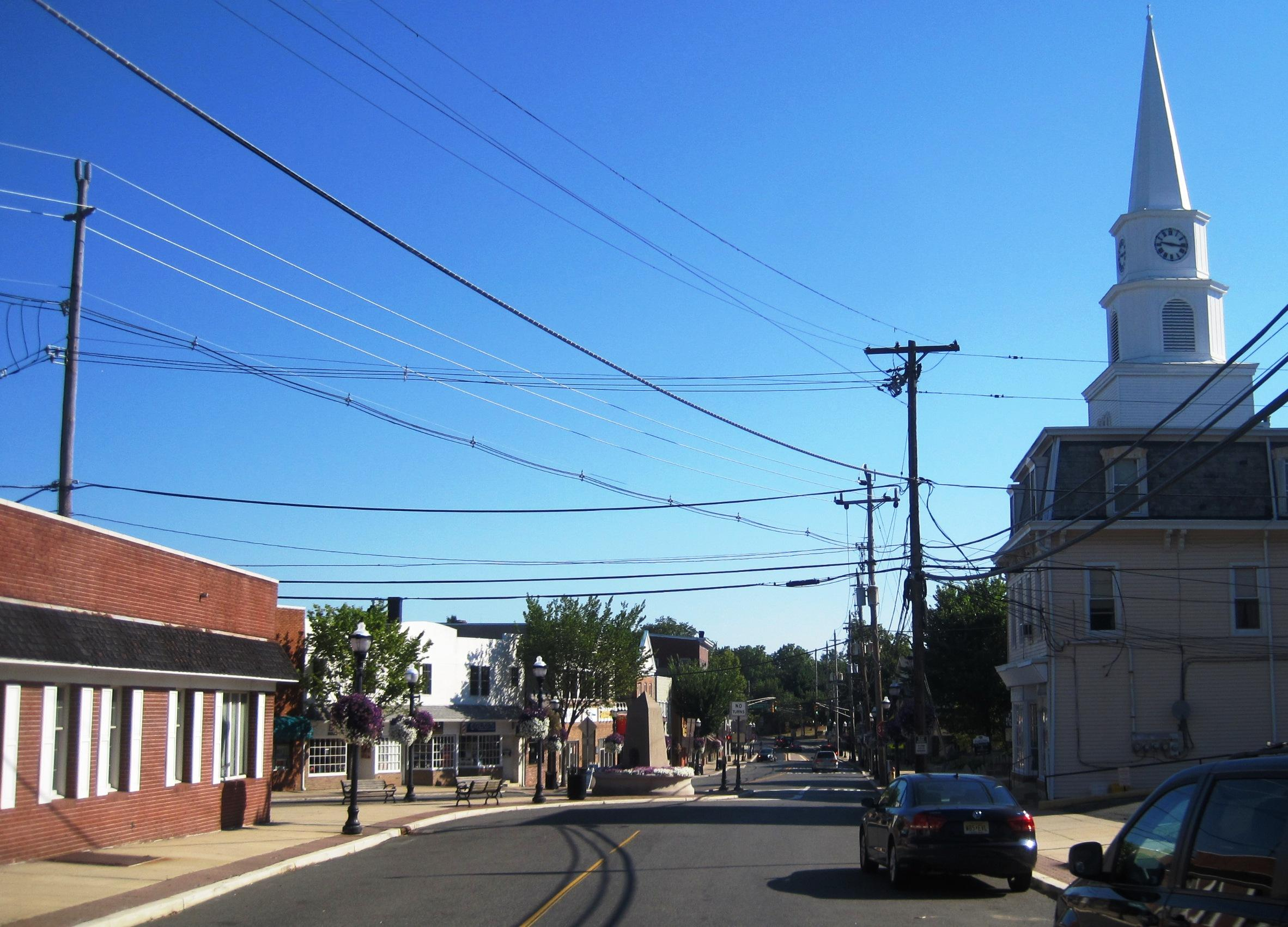
Downtown Hightstown

Downtown Hightstown, located at the intersection of Route 33 and County Route 571, is the central business district for the borough. It features restaurants, boutiques, art galleries and historical sites. Downtown Hightstown, Inc., established in 2008, is an organization of businesses owners and stakeholders in the community of Hightstown, dedicated to promoting the "unique ability to be a town big enough to provide a diverse offering of business services while being small enough to offer excellent personal service to residents, visitors and customers." Numerous businesses are also dotted along U.S. Route 130 in neighboring East Windsor.

== Government ==
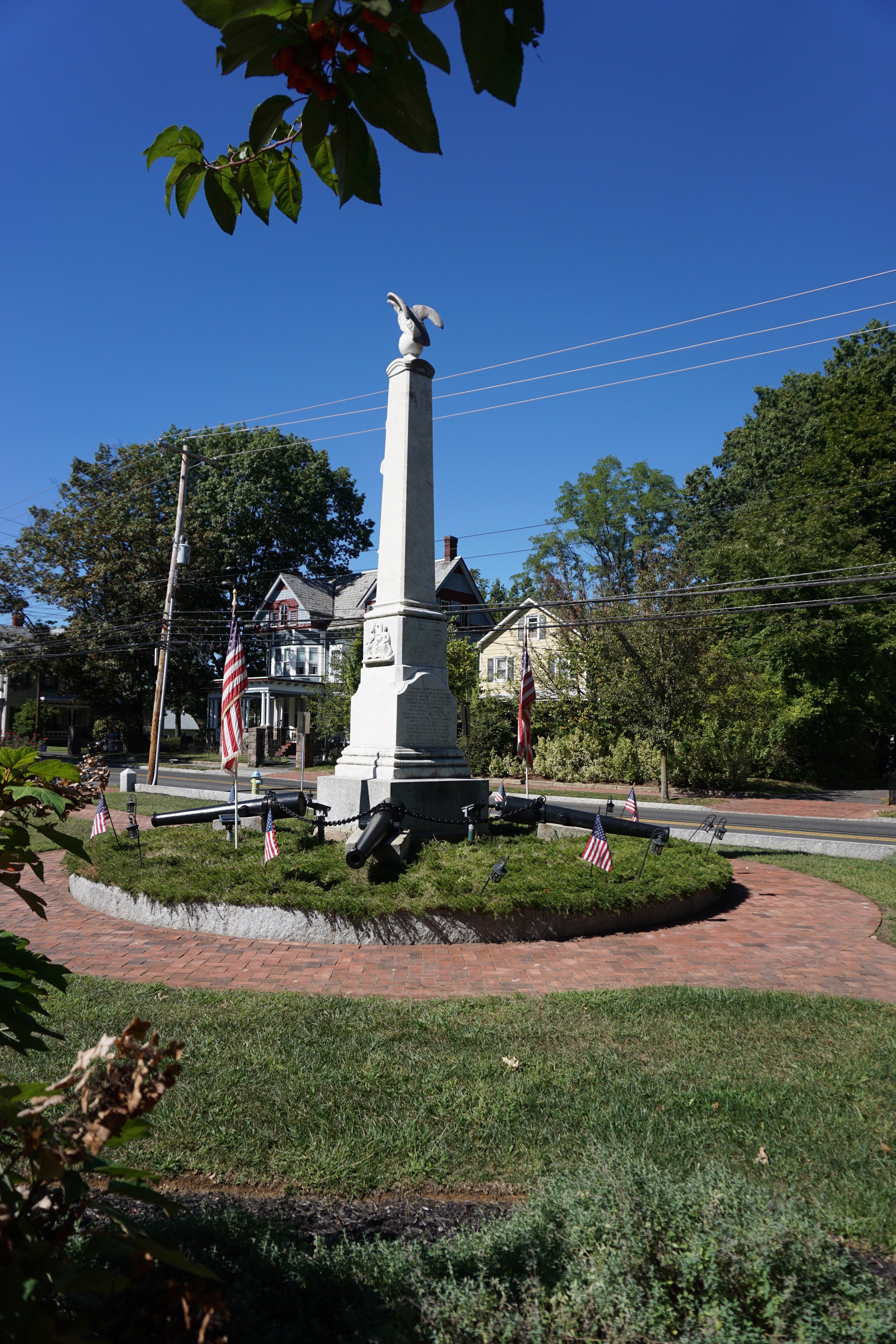
Hightstown Civil War Memorial

=== Local government ===
Hightstown is governed under the borough form of New Jersey municipal government, which is used in 218 municipalities (of the 564) statewide, making it the most common form of government in New Jersey. The governing body is comprised of the mayor and the borough council, with all positions elected at-large on a partisan basis as part of the November general election. The mayor is elected directly by the voters to a four-year term of office. The borough council includes six members, who are elected to serve three-year terms on a staggered basis, with two seats coming up for election each year in a three-year cycle. The borough form of government used by Hightstown is a "weak mayor / strong council" government in which council members act as the legislative body with the mayor presiding at meetings and voting only in the event of a tie. The mayor can veto ordinances subject to an override by a two-thirds majority vote of the council. The mayor makes committee and liaison assignments for council members, and most appointments are made by the mayor with the advice and consent of the council.

As of 2023, the mayor of the Borough of Hightstown is Democrat Susan Bluth, whose term of office ends on December 31, 2026. Borough Council members are Council President Joshua Jackson (D, 2025), Joseph Cicalese (D, 2023), Cristina Fowler (D, 2023), Todd Frantz (D, 2025), Jeet Gulati (D, 2024; appointed to serve an unexpired term) and Fred Montferrat (D, 2024).

The borough council appointed Jeet Gulati in February 2023 to fill the council seat expiring in December 2024 that had been held by Susan Bluth until she resigned the previous month to take office as mayor; Gulati will serve on an interim basis until the November 2023 general election, when voters will choose a candidate to fill the balance of the term of office.

In January 2019, the borough council selected Patricia Egan from a list of three candidates nominated by the Republican municipal committee to fill the seat expiring in December 2020 that became vacant the previous month following the resignation of Connor Montferrat. At that same meeting, the council chose Joshua Jackson from a list of three Democrats to fill the seat scheduled to expire in December 2019 that had been held by Denise "Denny" Hansen until she resigned from office in December 2018. In the November 2019 general election, Democrat Joseph Cicalese was elected to serve the balance of the term of office through December 2020.

In January 2015, the council selected former council president Susan Bluth to fill the vacant council seat expiring in December 2015 of Larry Quattrone, who left office when he was sworn in as mayor.

Seth Kurs was appointed in April 2014 from among three prospective candidates to fill the vacant seat expiring in 2015 of Gail Doran, who had resigned earlier in the month, citing personal reasons. The term of the appointment ran through November 14, 2014, after which Seth Kurs was elected in the general election to complete the remaining unexpired term through December 31, 2015.

=== Federal, state, and county representation ===
Hightstown is located in the 3rd Congressional District and is part of New Jersey's 14th state legislative district.

Prior to the 2011 reapportionment following the 2010 census, Hightstown had been in the 12th state legislative district. Prior to the 2010 Census, Hightstown had been part of the 4th Congressional District, a change made by the New Jersey Redistricting Commission that took effect in January 2013, based on the results of the November 2012 general elections.

For the 119th United States Congress, New Jersey's 3rd congressional district is currently represented Herb Conaway (D, Delran Township). New Jersey is represented in the United States Senate by Democrats Cory Booker (Newark, term ends 2027) and Andy Kim (Moorestown, term ends 2031).

For the 2026–2027 session, the 14th legislative district of the New Jersey Legislature is represented in the State Senate by Linda R. Greenstein (D, Plainsboro Township) and in the General Assembly by Wayne DeAngelo (D, Hamilton Township) and Tennille McCoy (D, Hamilton Township).

Mercer County is governed by a County Executive who oversees the day-to-day operations of the county and by a seven-member Board of County Commissioners that acts in a legislative capacity, setting policy. All officials are chosen at-large in partisan elections, with the executive serving a four-year term of office while the commissioners serve three-year terms of office on a staggered basis, with either two or three seats up for election each year as part of the November general election. As of 2025, the County Executive is Daniel R. Benson (D, Hamilton Township) whose term of office ends December 31, 2027. Mercer County's Commissioners are:

Lucylle R. S. Walter (D, Ewing Township, 2026), Chair John A. Cimino (D, Hamilton Township, 2026), Samuel T. Frisby Sr. (D, Trenton, 2027), Cathleen M. Lewis (D, Lawrence Township, 2025), Vice Chair Kristin L. McLaughlin (D, Hopewell Township, 2027), Nina D. Melker (D, Hamilton Township, 2025) and Terrance Stokes (D, Ewing Township, 2027).

Mercer County's constitutional officers are: Clerk Paula Sollami-Covello (D, Lawrence Township, 2025), Sheriff John A. Kemler (D, Hamilton Township, 2026) and Surrogate Diane Gerofsky (D, Lawrence Township, 2026).

=== Politics ===
As of March 2011, there were a total of 2,891 registered voters in Hightstown, of which 1,105 (38.2%) were registered as Democrats, 542 (18.7%) were registered as Republicans and 1,241 (42.9%) were registered as Unaffiliated. There were 3 voters registered as Libertarians or Greens.

United States presidential election results for Hightstown
Year	Republican		Democratic		Third party(ies)	
Year	No.	%	No.	%	No.	%
2024	759	32.09%	1,567	66.26%	39	1.65%
2020	789	30.13%	1,781	68.00%	49	1.87%
2016	729	32.14%	1,438	63.40%	101	4.45%
2012	707	33.38%	1,369	64.64%	42	1.98%
2008	685	30.79%	1,504	67.60%	36	1.62%
2004	771	37.61%	1,254	61.17%	25	1.22%

In the 2012 presidential election, Democrat Barack Obama received 64.6% of the vote (1,369 cast), ahead of Republican Mitt Romney with 33.4% (707 votes), and other candidates with 2.0% (42 votes), among the 2,308 ballots cast by the borough's 3,062 registered voters (190 ballots were spoiled), for a turnout of 75.4%. In the 2008 presidential election, Democrat Barack Obama received 66.8% of the vote (1,504 cast), ahead of Republican John McCain with 30.4% (685 votes) and other candidates with 1.6% (36 votes), among the 2,253 ballots cast by the borough's 2,962 registered voters, for a turnout of 76.1%. In the 2004 presidential election, Democrat John Kerry received 59.3% of the vote (1,254 ballots cast), outpolling Republican George W. Bush with 36.4% (771 votes) and other candidates with 0.9% (25 votes), among the 2,116 ballots cast by the borough's 2,776 registered voters, for a turnout percentage of 76.2.

Gubernatorial election results for Hightstown
Year	Republican		Democratic		Third party(ies)	
Year	No.	%	No.	%	No.	%
2025	559	29.69%	1,319	70.05%	5	0.27%
2021	523	35.22%	942	63.43%	20	1.35%
2017	493	38.73%	744	58.44%	36	2.83%
2013	765	57.91%	512	38.76%	44	3.33%
2009	700	46.60%	679	45.21%	123	8.19%
2005	582	41.22%	750	53.12%	80	5.67%

In the 2013 gubernatorial election, Republican Chris Christie received 57.9% of the vote (765 cast), ahead of Democrat Barbara Buono with 38.8% (512 votes), and other candidates with 3.3% (44 votes), among the 1,341 ballots cast by the borough's 2,961 registered voters (20 ballots were spoiled), for a turnout of 45.3%. In the 2009 gubernatorial election, Republican Chris Christie received 46.2% of the vote (700 ballots cast), ahead of Democrat Jon Corzine with 44.8% (679 votes), Independent Chris Daggett with 7.1% (107 votes) and other candidates with 1.1% (16 votes), among the 1,514 ballots cast by the borough's 2,908 registered voters, yielding a 52.1% turnout.

United States Senate election results for Hightstown1
Year	Republican		Democratic		Third party(ies)	
Year	No.	%	No.	%	No.	%
2024	691	29.80%	1,588	68.48%	40	1.72%
2018	622	36.89%	1,006	59.67%	58	3.44%
2012	711	35.04%	1,262	62.20%	56	2.76%
2006	544	38.07%	834	58.36%	51	3.57%

United States Senate election results for Hightstown2
Year	Republican		Democratic		Third party(ies)	
Year	No.	%	No.	%	No.	%
2020	826	32.53%	1,661	65.42%	52	2.05%
2014	480	37.85%	759	59.86%	29	2.29%
2013	317	39.28%	474	58.74%	16	1.98%
2008	776	37.43%	1,246	60.11%	51	2.46%

== Education ==
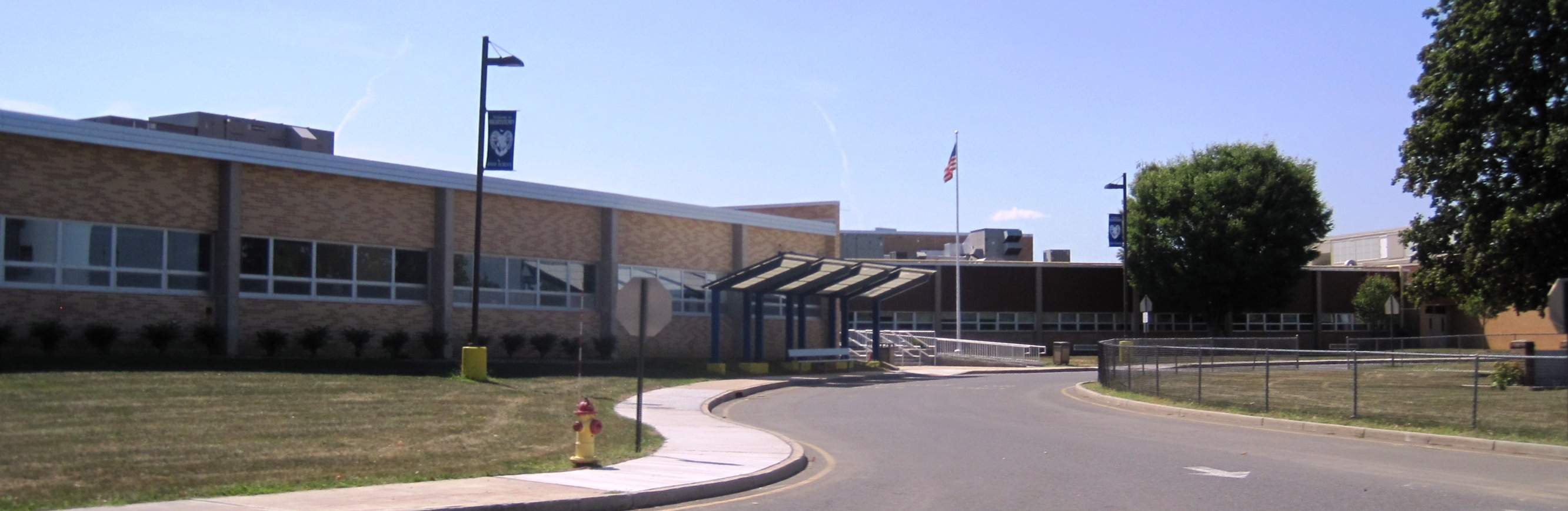
Hightstown High School located on Leshin Lane

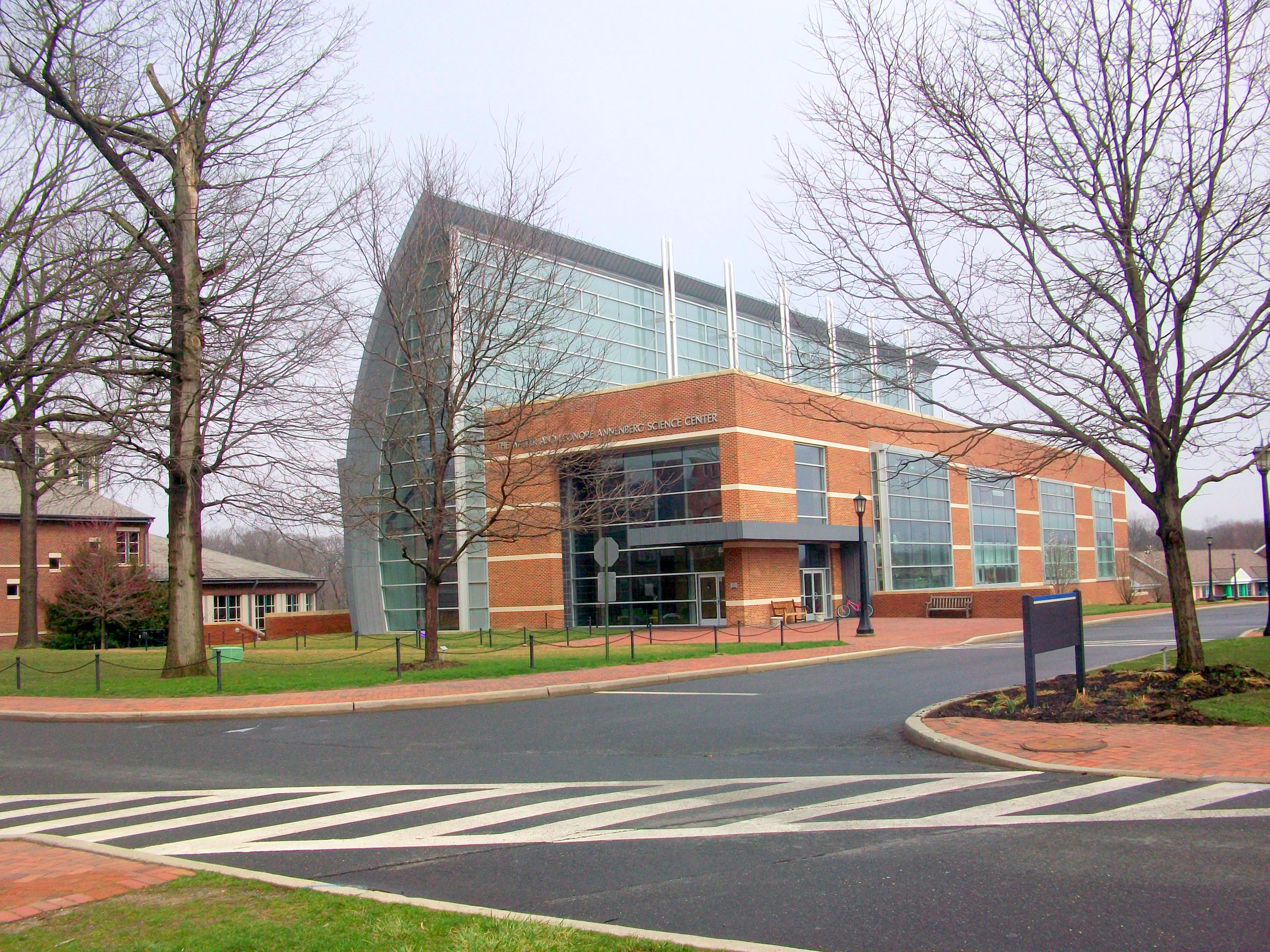
The Annenberg Science Center

Students in public school for pre-kindergarten through twelfth grade attend the East Windsor Regional School District, which serves students from East Windsor and Hightstown. As of the 2022–23 school year, the district, comprised of six schools, had an enrollment of 5,138 students and 450.0 classroom teachers (on an FTE basis), for a student–teacher ratio of 11.4:1. Public school students in seventh through twelfth grades from Roosevelt Borough (in Monmouth County) are sent to the district's schools as part of a sending/receiving relationship with the Roosevelt Public School District. The seats on the nine-member board of education are allocated based on the population of the constituent municipalities, with two seats assigned to Hightstown.

Schools in the district (with 2022–23 enrollment data from the National Center for Education Statistics) are Walter C. Black Elementary School with 480 students in grades K-2, Ethel McKnight Elementary School with 589 students in grades K-2, Perry L. Drew Elementary School with 579 students in grades 3-5, Grace N. Rogers Elementary School with 611 students in grades PreK / 3-5, Melvin H. Kreps Middle School with 1,176 students in grades 6-8 and Hightstown High School with 1,644 students in grades 9-12.

Eighth grade students from all of Mercer County are eligible to apply to attend the high school programs offered by the Mercer County Technical Schools, a county-wide vocational school district that offers full-time career and technical education at its Health Sciences Academy, STEM Academy and Academy of Culinary Arts, with no tuition charged to students for attendance.

Hightstown is also home to the Peddie School, a coeducational, independent high school founded in 1864.

== Historic district ==
- Stockton Street Historic District
- U.S. National Register of Historic Places
- U.S. Historic district
- New Jersey Register of Historic Places
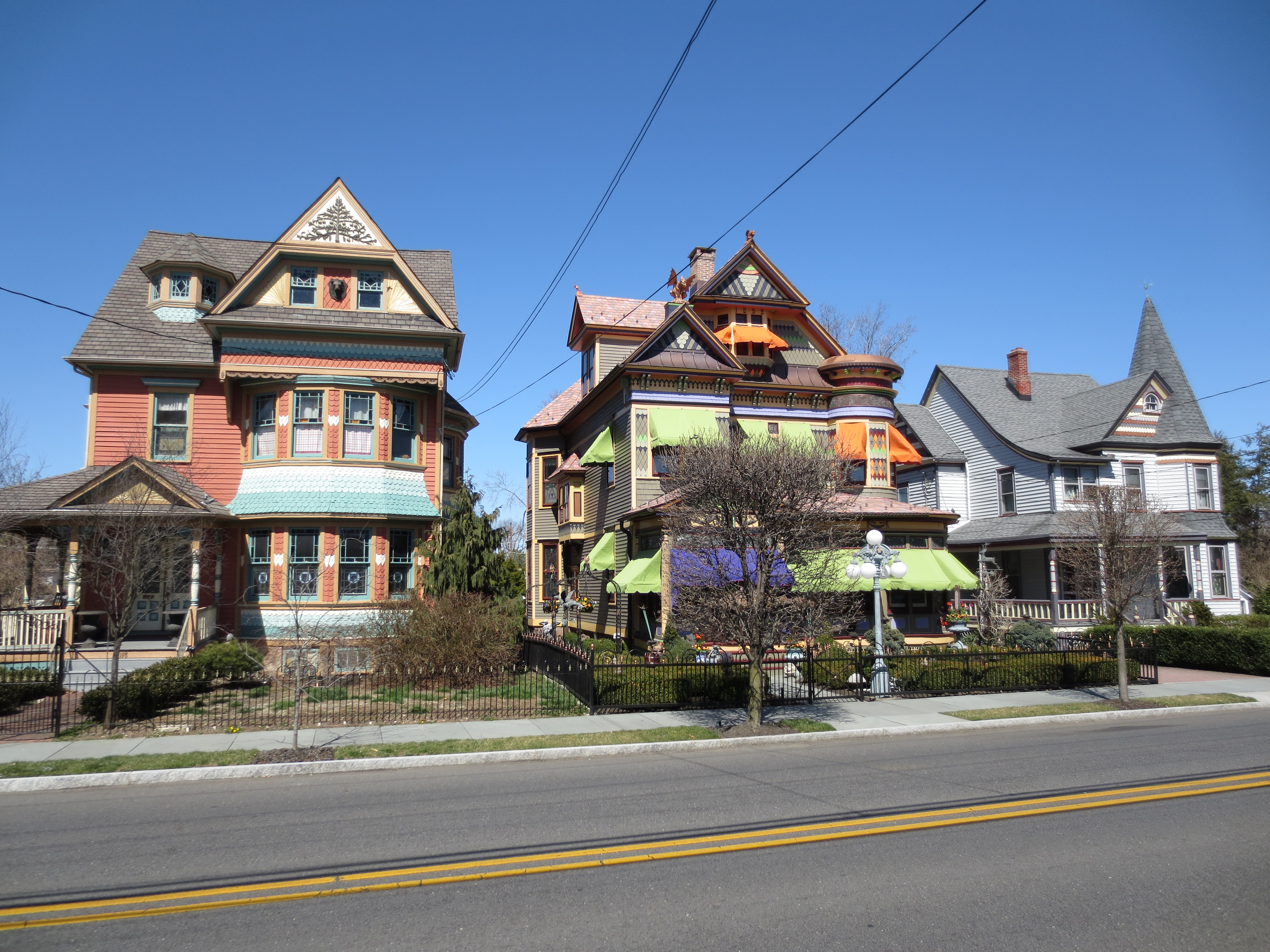

- Location within Mercer County, New Jersey Location within New Jersey Location within the United States
- Location: 126-326 Stockton Street, 219-237 Rogers Avenue, Hightstown, New Jersey
- Architectural style: Queen Anne, Gothic, Italianate, Federal, Colonial
- NRHP reference No.: 05001331
- NJRHP No.: 4447

Significant dates
- Added to NRHP: November 25, 2005
- Designated NJRHP: May 13, 2005

The Stockton Street Historic District covers both sides of Stockton Street (County Route 571), from Railroad Avenue to Summit Street, and a portion of Rogers Avenue. It is notable for its Victorian homes, First Methodist Church, and the Hightstown Civil War monument. It is also significant for its association with the introduction of rail service to New Jersey, as the first railroad in the United States to connect two major cities, New York and Philadelphia. With the historical significance of Hightstown, in July 2015 it became a Preserve America community, aimed at enriching the community's historic preservation efforts.

== Infrastructure ==
=== Transportation ===
==== Roads and highways ====
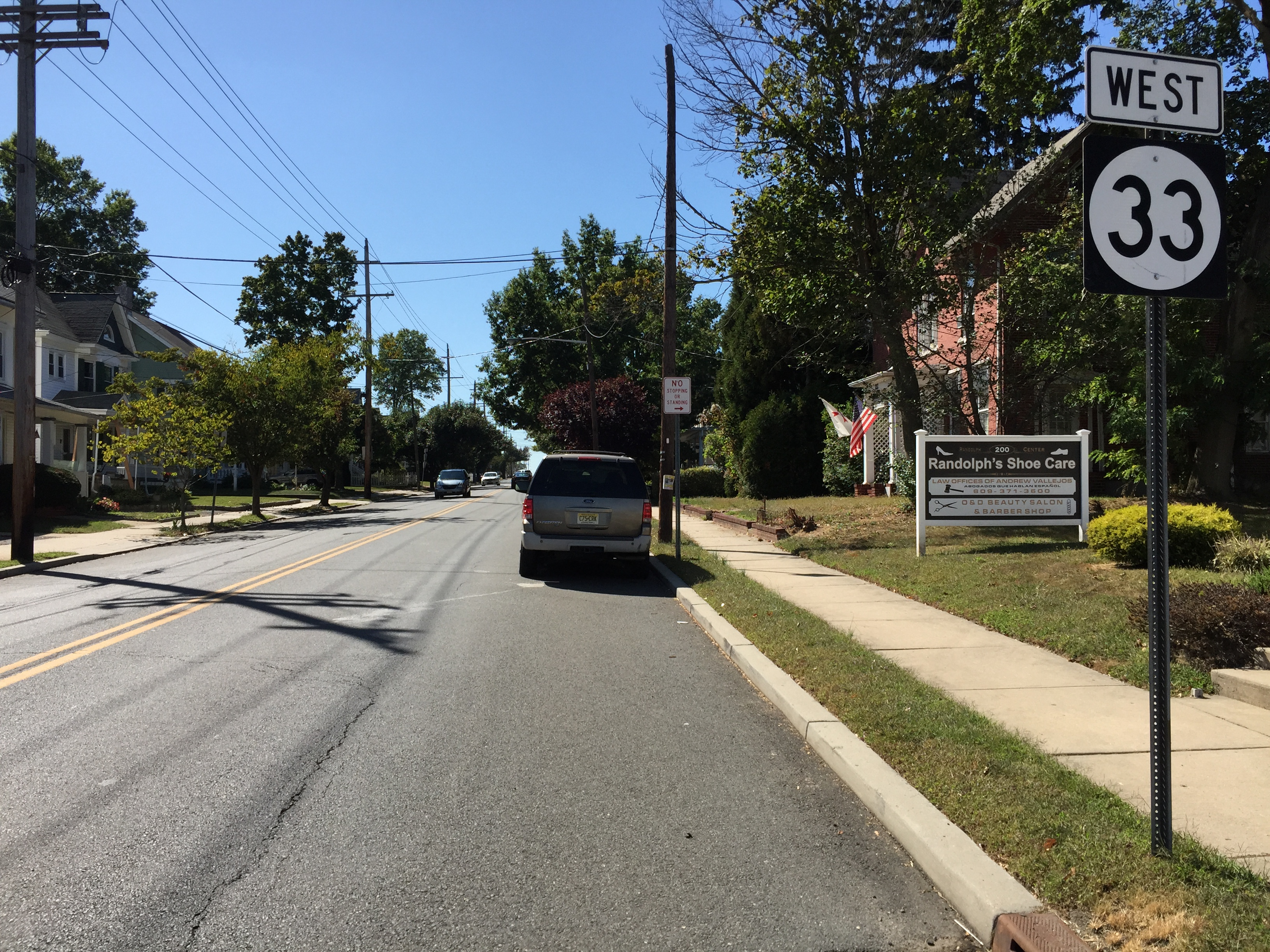
Route 33 westbound in Hightstown

As of May 2010, the borough had a total of 16.74 miles (26.94 km) of roadways, of which 12.70 miles (20.44 km) were maintained by the municipality, 2.74 miles (4.41 km) by Mercer County and 1.30 miles (2.09 km) by the New Jersey Department of Transportation.

Hightstown is located at the cross-roads of several major roads. The main highway through the borough is Route 33, which is also concurrent with County Route 539 (CR 539) and County Route 571 (CR 571). A small portion of U.S. Route 130 passes through the northwest corner and is accessible by Route 33, CR 571 and CR 539. Highways located just outside the borough include the New Jersey Turnpike (Interstate 95) and the "Hightstown Bypass" (Route 133), which both intersect with Route 33 at Exit 8 of the turnpike.

==== Public transportation ====
The Greater Mercer Transportation Management Association offers service on the Route 130 Connection between the Trenton Transit Center and South Brunswick. The Princeton Junction Shuttle connects East Windsor and Hightstown with the Princeton Junction Rail Station.

There is also direct service to New York, as well as other New Jersey communities on the Suburban Coach route 300 to and from the Port Authority Bus Terminal, Grand Central Terminal and other destinations in Midtown Manhattan and the 600 route to and from Downtown Manhattan / Wall Street.

==== Railroads ====
Hightstown was formerly served by the Camden & Amboy Railroad (C&A), the first chartered railway company in the state and the third-oldest in the United States. Service to Hightstown began in December 1831 using the British-built John Bull locomotive. C&A was acquired by the Pennsylvania Railroad (PRR) in 1871 after consolidating it with the United New Jersey Railroad and Canal Company. Ownership was later transferred to Penn Central (PC) in 1968, following by Conrail in 1976 after PC went bankrupt.

Freight service ended in 1982 when Conrail notified the borough of its intent to abandon the line, and the railroad bridges across Stockton Street and Main Street were removed in 1984.

=== Healthcare ===
Hightstown is served by CentraState Healthcare System, a 287-bed regional hospital affiliated with Rutgers Robert Wood Johnson Medical School, located in nearby Freehold Township. CentraState Healthcare system also provides healthcare through its various family practices in communities across central New Jersey. One of those six family practices has an office located in neighboring East Windsor on U.S. Route 130.

The next closest hospitals to the borough include the Hamilton Division of Robert Wood Johnson University Hospital in Hamilton Township and Penn Medicine Princeton Medical Center in Plainsboro Township.

== Ecology ==
According to the A. W. Kuchler U.S. potential natural vegetation types, Hightstown would have an Appalachian Oak (104) vegetation type with an Eastern Hardwood Forest (25) vegetation form.

== Climate ==
According to the Köppen climate classification system, Hightstown has a hot-summer, wet all year, humid continental climate (Dfa). Dfa climates are characterized by at least one month having an average mean temperature at or below 32.0 °F (0.0 °C), at least four months with an average mean temperature at or above 50.0 °F (10.0 °C), at least one month with an average mean temperature at or above 71.6 °F (22.0 °C), and no significant precipitation difference between seasons. During the summer months, episodes of extreme heat and humidity can occur with heat index values at or above 100.0 °F (37.8 °C). On average, the wettest month of the year is July which corresponds with the annual peak in thunderstorm activity. During the winter months, episodes of extreme cold and wind can occur with wind chill values below 0.0 °F (−17.8 °C). The plant hardiness zone is 7a with an average annual extreme minimum air temperature of 0.0 °F (−17.8 °C). The average seasonal (November–April) snowfall total is 24 to 30 inches (61 to 76 cm), and the average snowiest month is February which corresponds with the annual peak in nor'easter activity.

Climate data for Hightstown, Mercer County, New Jersey (1991–2020 normals, extremes 1893–present)
Month	Jan	Feb	Mar	Apr	May	Jun	Jul	Aug	Sep	Oct	Nov	Dec	Year
Record high °F (°C)	73 (23)	77 (25)	88 (31)	95 (35)	97 (36)	100 (38)	105 (41)	102 (39)	103 (39)	95 (35)	83 (28)	76 (24)	105 (41)
Mean maximum °F (°C)	62.8 (17.1)	62.8 (17.1)	72.6 (22.6)	84.3 (29.1)	89.8 (32.1)	93.6 (34.2)	96.4 (35.8)	94.3 (34.6)	90.6 (32.6)	81.9 (27.7)	73.5 (23.1)	65.3 (18.5)	97.5 (36.4)
Mean daily maximum °F (°C)	40.5 (4.7)	43.0 (6.1)	50.9 (10.5)	62.9 (17.2)	72.8 (22.7)	81.7 (27.6)	86.7 (30.4)	84.9 (29.4)	78.3 (25.7)	66.4 (19.1)	55.3 (12.9)	45.5 (7.5)	64.1 (17.8)
Daily mean °F (°C)	31.0 (−0.6)	32.8 (0.4)	40.3 (4.6)	51.0 (10.6)	60.6 (15.9)	69.8 (21.0)	74.9 (23.8)	72.9 (22.7)	66.1 (18.9)	54.3 (12.4)	44.2 (6.8)	36.1 (2.3)	52.8 (11.6)
Mean daily minimum °F (°C)	21.4 (−5.9)	22.7 (−5.2)	29.7 (−1.3)	39.0 (3.9)	48.4 (9.1)	57.8 (14.3)	63.0 (17.2)	60.8 (16.0)	53.8 (12.1)	42.2 (5.7)	33.0 (0.6)	26.6 (−3.0)	41.5 (5.3)
Mean minimum °F (°C)	5.2 (−14.9)	7.5 (−13.6)	16.1 (−8.8)	27.5 (−2.5)	34.9 (1.6)	45.3 (7.4)	53.2 (11.8)	50.6 (10.3)	40.2 (4.6)	28.4 (−2.0)	19.4 (−7.0)	12.9 (−10.6)	2.8 (−16.2)
Record low °F (°C)	−16 (−27)	−11 (−24)	2 (−17)	10 (−12)	28 (−2)	35 (2)	42 (6)	40 (4)	28 (−2)	22 (−6)	0 (−18)	−12 (−24)	−16 (−27)
Average precipitation inches (mm)	3.46 (88)	2.61 (66)	4.28 (109)	3.67 (93)	4.07 (103)	4.63 (118)	4.82 (122)	4.29 (109)	4.15 (105)	3.98 (101)	3.26 (83)	4.23 (107)	47.45 (1,205)
Average snowfall inches (cm)	5.8 (15)	8.0 (20)	4.6 (12)	0.6 (1.5)	0.0 (0.0)	0.0 (0.0)	0.0 (0.0)	0.0 (0.0)	0.0 (0.0)	0.0 (0.0)	0.3 (0.76)	4.4 (11)	23.7 (60)
Average precipitation days (≥ 0.01 in)	10.6	9.4	11.3	11.5	12.3	11.7	10.5	10.1	9.0	9.9	9.1	10.7	126.1
Average snowy days (≥ 0.1 in)	3.2	3.4	2.3	0.3	0.0	0.0	0.0	0.0	0.0	0.0	0.1	1.7	11.0
Source: NOAA

== Notable people ==
People who were born in, residents of, or otherwise closely associated with Hightstown include:

- Jim Barlow, soccer coach
- Kay B. Barrett (1902–1995), Hollywood talent scout who acquired the movie rights to the book Gone with the Wind
- Estelle Brodman (1914–2007), medical librarian and academic, lived in Hightstown after her retirement
- Howard Haycraft (1905–1991), writer, editor and publisher
- Hilly Kristal (1931–2007), founder and owner of the New York City music club CBGB
- Larry Kelley (1915–2000), football player who won the Heisman Trophy in 1936
- Desiree Lubovska (1893–1974), founded the American National Ballet School at Hightstown in 1921
- Doug Mastriano (born 1964), politician who is a retired Colonel of the United States Army and the state senator for Pennsylvania's 33rd District
- Worrall Frederick Mountain (1909–1992), Justice of the New Jersey Supreme Court from 1971 to 1979
- Elizabeth Greenleaf Pattee (1893–1991), architect, landscape architect and architecture professor
- Neville Pearson (1898-1982), British newspaper publisher, lived at Hightstown at time of his death.
- Randal Pinkett (born 1971), business consultant who in 2005 was the winner of season four of the reality television show, The Apprentice
- Jonathan Sprout (born 1952), songwriter, performer and recording artist
- Martin Waldron (1925–1981), winner of the 1964 Pulitzer Prize for reporting on unchecked spending on the Florida Turnpike
- Charles L. Walters (c. 1862–1894), politician who served in the New Jersey General Assembly
- Paul Watkins (born 1964), novelist
- John Archibald Wheeler (1911–2008), physicist
- Ed Whited (born 1964), former Major League Baseball third baseman who played for the Atlanta Braves during the 1989 season
- Nick Williams (born 1990), wide receiver who has played in the NFL for the Washington Redskins
- John Woodruff (1915–2007), Gold Medalist at 800 metres at the 1936 Summer Olympics in Berlin
