= Grenadine (cloth) =

Light, open, gauze-like cloth

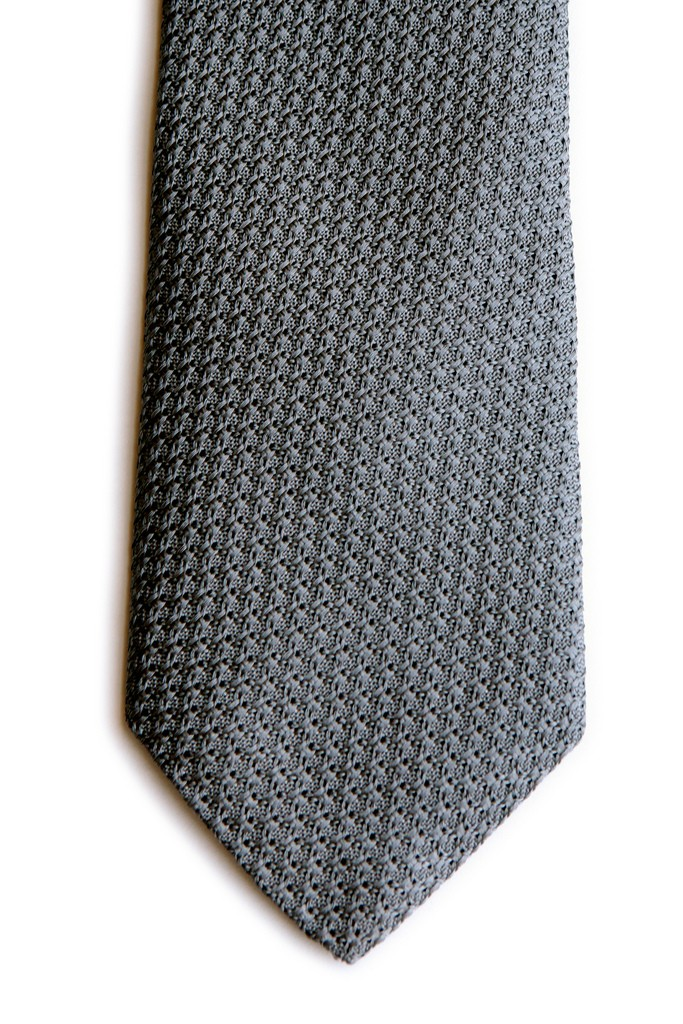
Tie made with silver color silk in grenadine weave

Grenadine is a weave characterised by its light, open, gauze-like feel, and is produced on jacquard looms. Originally produced in Italy and worn as a black silk lace in France in the eighteenth century, it is now woven with silk for use in ties.

== Grenadine ties ==
For the most part, ties made from grenadine silk are solid in color with the visual interest being the unique weave. The solid colors make the tie versatile with other patterns and colors as well as both formal and informal jackets.

Grenadine ties have been associated with James Bond. Sean Connery's wardrobe for his role as 007 prominently featured grenadine ties from his first film appearance in Dr. No and every actor who has played the role since then has worn grenadine ties at some point.

Fermo Fossati and Seteria Bianchi are two of the most renowned makers of grenadine in Como. The former is the oldest silk-making company in Italy – the third oldest in Europe after the British Vanners and Stephen Walters & Sons. Seteria Bianchi produced the fabrics for the Brioni jackets worn by Daniel Craig in 007 Casino Royale. Ettore Bianchi, the former owner of Seteria Bianchi, wrote the International Dictionary of Textiles, published in Italian in 1997, in which he describes grenadine (“Garza a giro inglese”): “A fabric quite common in the past, now forgotten, which was employed to make shirts and colonial uniforms in tropical areas due to its incredible breathability. The fabric employed is cotton, and the weave is an English gauze in which two warp yarns are twisted around the weave and around the weft. The weight is between 150 and 250 gr/m2, but the open gauze weave makes it a quite light and breathable fabric that is excellent in the presence of harsh climates such that of the Tropics. This fabric has been also employed to produce curtains.”
