= Desiree Lubovska =

American dancer (1893–1974)

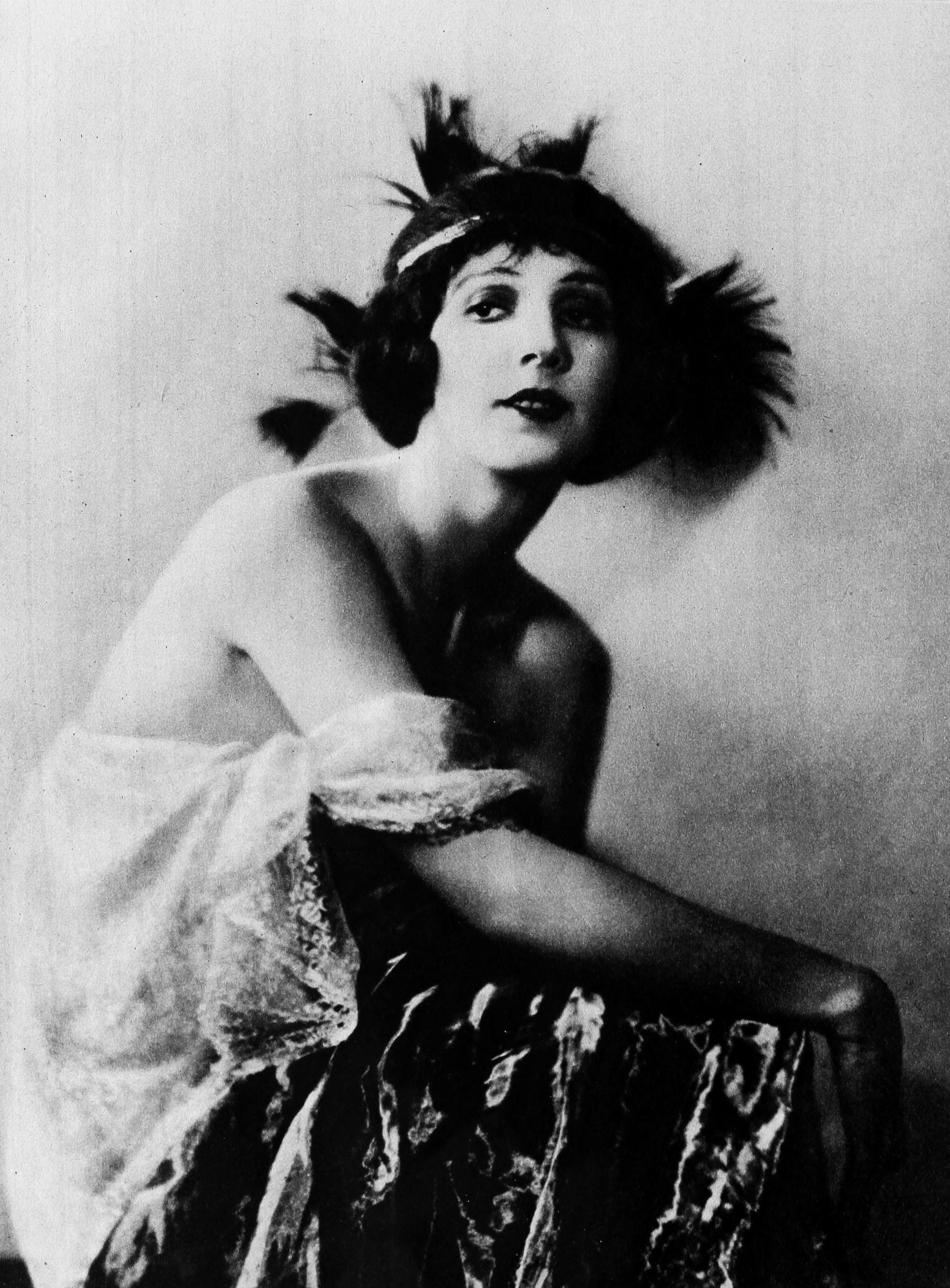
Desiree Lubovska in 1920.

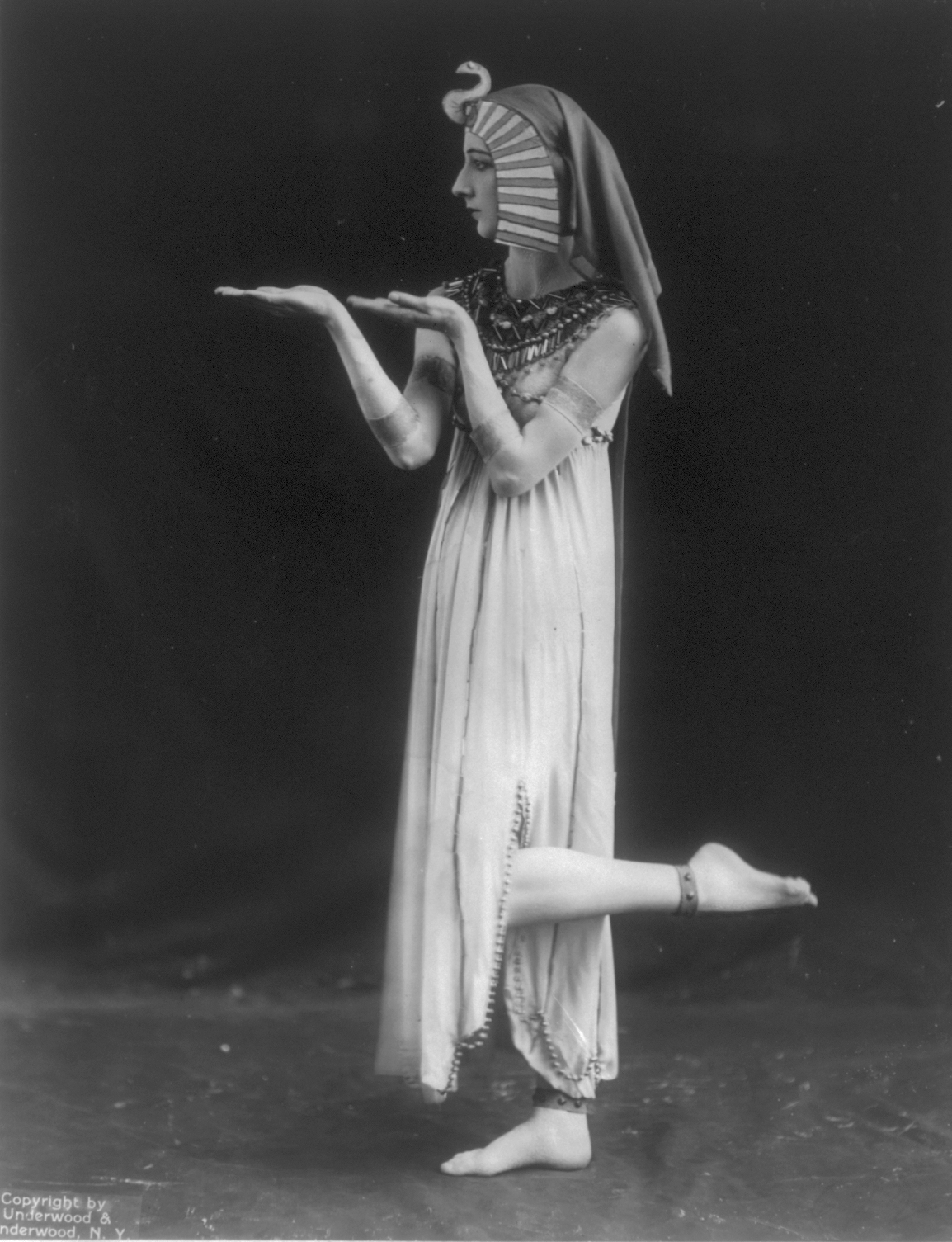
Lubowska as Cleopatra, circa 1915.

Desiree Lubovska (June 21, 1893 — 1974), also seen as Desiree Lubowska, was the professional name of American dancer Winniefred Foote.

== Early life ==
Winniefred Foote was born in Faribault, Minnesota. She changed her name, adopted an accent in her speech, and created a backstory of dancing in Russia; she also said that she studied Egyptian art at the British Museum and became convinced that "angles, sharp corners, such as we find on the ancient tablets of Egypt, where lovely Egyptian women of the early day are portrayed, are only beautiful." She went on a diet and fitness regimen in pursuit of a more angular physique, and her dances reflect this focus. "I finally felt I was one of them, a reincarnated spirit of the Nile."

== Career ==
Lubovska started the short-lived but ambitious National American Ballet company in 1921. The national ballet program was housed on a farm in Hightstown, New Jersey. The school was later relocated to Arlington, Virginia, with her mother Blanche E. Foote as the school's business manager.

In 1918 Lubovska appeared as "Night" in the "musical spectacle" Everything with music by Irving Berlin and Philip Sousa, at the Hippodrome in New York. Also at the Hippodrome, in 1920, she danced at a benefit for the Serbian Child Welfare Association. In 1921, Lubovka sued V. Vivaudou, an American talcum powder manufacturer, for using an image of her "in scant attire" in a newspaper advertisement. That year, she danced at the International Silk Exposition in New York, embodying "The Spirit of Silk", beginning with a burst from a cocoon. Also in 1921 she danced at meetings of the National Garment Retailers' Association and the New York League of Advertising Women, performing at the latter "a satire on modes and manners." In 1922 she was touring in South America.

She appears in the silent film Greater Than Fame (1920).

== Personal life ==
Desiree Lubovska had a son, Joseph Willard Schutz, born in 1912. She died in 1974, aged 80 years.
