= Utopian experiment (disambiguation) =

Utopian experiment is an alternative name for an intentional community. It also may refer to:

- Impossible Cities: A Utopian Experiment, a multidisciplinary play
- Social experiment for evaluation of utopian proposals.
- Utopia Experiment, a social experiment in Scotland
- The Utopia Experiments, a fictional graphic novel in the British 2013 TV series Utopia.
- Utopia (book) by Thomas Moore
