= Paul Prestopino =

American musician (1938–2023)

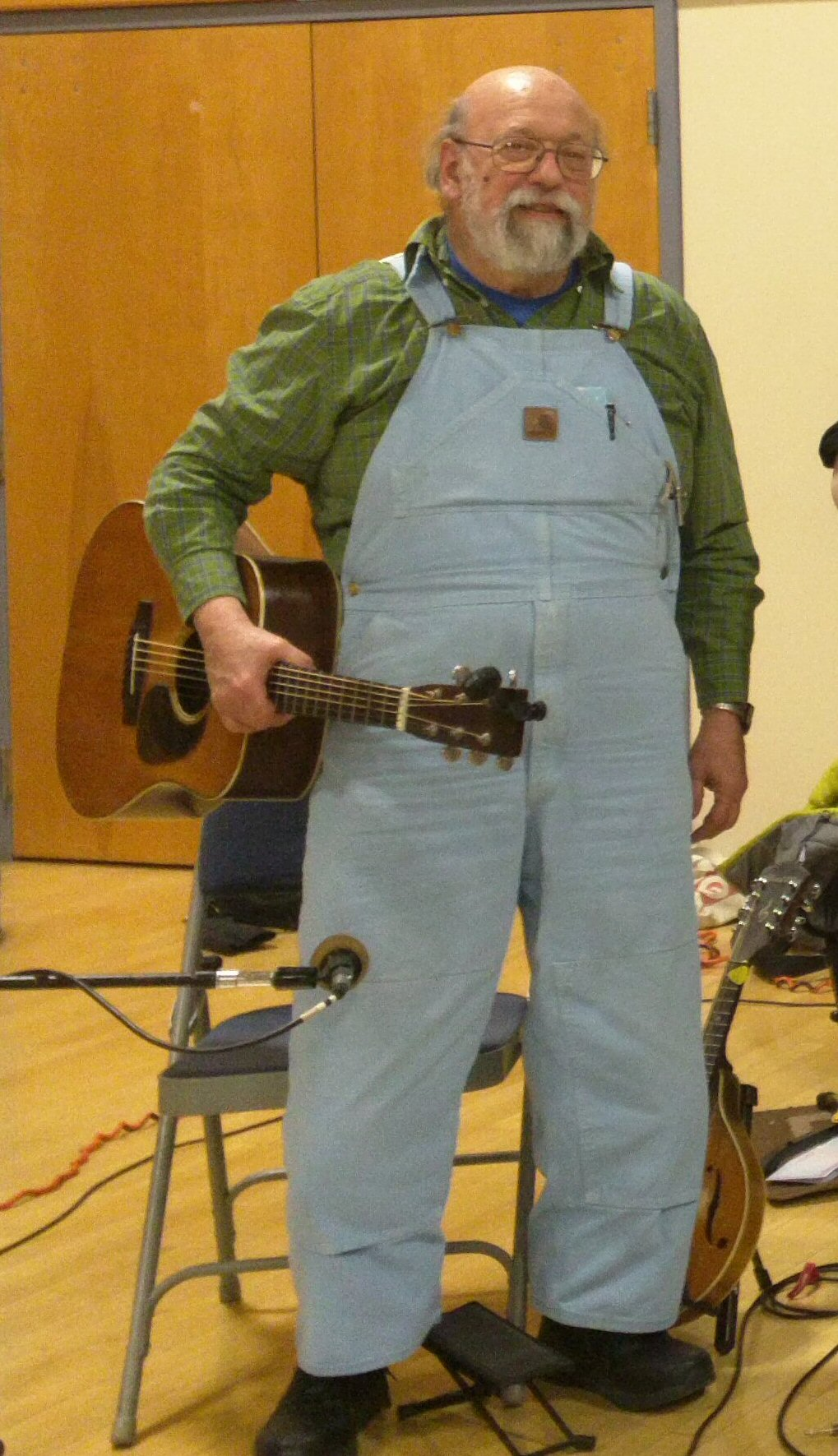
- Prestopino in 2016

Background information
- Born: September 20, 1938
- Died: July 16, 2023 (aged 84)
- Occupations: Musician; audio engineer
- Instruments: Guitar; banjo; dobro; mandolin; mandola; autoharp; harmonicas

Paul Prestopino (September 20, 1938 – July 16, 2023) was a multi-instrumental musician and audio engineer from the artist colony in Roosevelt, New Jersey, and the son of artist Gregorio Prestopino.

== Early life and career ==
Prestopino's family moved from Brooklyn to Roosevelt in 1949. He graduated in 1956 from Hightstown High School and attended the University of Wisconsin–Madison as a physics student where he also worked as a physics lab technician.

In 1958 to 1959, Prestopino played on Sundays in Washington Square Park in New York City's Greenwich Village with the Greenbriar Boys. He left the Greenbriar Boys before they became nationally known to serve as an accompanist for the Chad Mitchell Trio, and he also played behind Peter, Paul & Mary for approximately fifteen years.

Prestopino worked from 1970 until 1989 as a studio technician with the Record Plant Studios in New York City. When Record Plant went out of business in 1989, he built and became the tech for Record Plant Remote (the Record Plant's studio-on-wheels), where he also served as a sound engineer for mainstream musicians in several musical genres. Although not a regular studio musician, due to his availability at the venue of many non-studio recordings (where he always brought instruments with him), Prestopino was frequently tapped to add a track or accompaniment whenever certain stringed instruments were desired. He contributed to albums by bands and singers such as Aerosmith, Rick Derringer, Alice Cooper, Pete Seeger, John Denver, Tom Paxton, and Judy Collins among others. On these recordings, he played various fretted instruments including guitar, banjo, dobro and mandolin. Prestopino first contributed guitar, autoharp, and mandolin accompaniment to John Denver's Rhymes & Reasons album in 1969, and he also is credited for playing on eight subsequent album releases of works by John Denver, including Take Me to Tomorrow and Aerie.

== Later life ==
In the second half of his life, Prestopino played frequently in small musical venues within driving range of his home, including the New Jersey Folk Festival and Howell Living History Farm, where he typically appeared with Jugtown Mountain String Band. Prestopino usually attended the Banjofest reunion of musicians who used to play in the park in the 1950s and ’60s, held annually in Washington Square Park, New York City. He performed annually for many years at the New England Folk Festival in Boston with his English Country Dance band (called Hold the Mustard). For 37 years, he played annually in the Roosevelt String Band in an always-sold-out concert at the Roosevelt Town Hall that included many accomplished musicians (such as Kai Altair) from the Roosevelt community. He also played regularly for contra-dances at Princeton Country Dancers (the contra-dance in Princeton, New Jersey) and acted as a sound and maintenance engineer, as well as a musician, for their open bands.

Prestopino could often be found in his off-hours jamming with a wide variety of musicians and composing several tunes for stringed instruments. In 2019, he recorded a bluegrass album as a member of the Magnolia Street String Band.

Prestopino died on July 16, 2023.
