= Janet Langsam =

American cultural activist

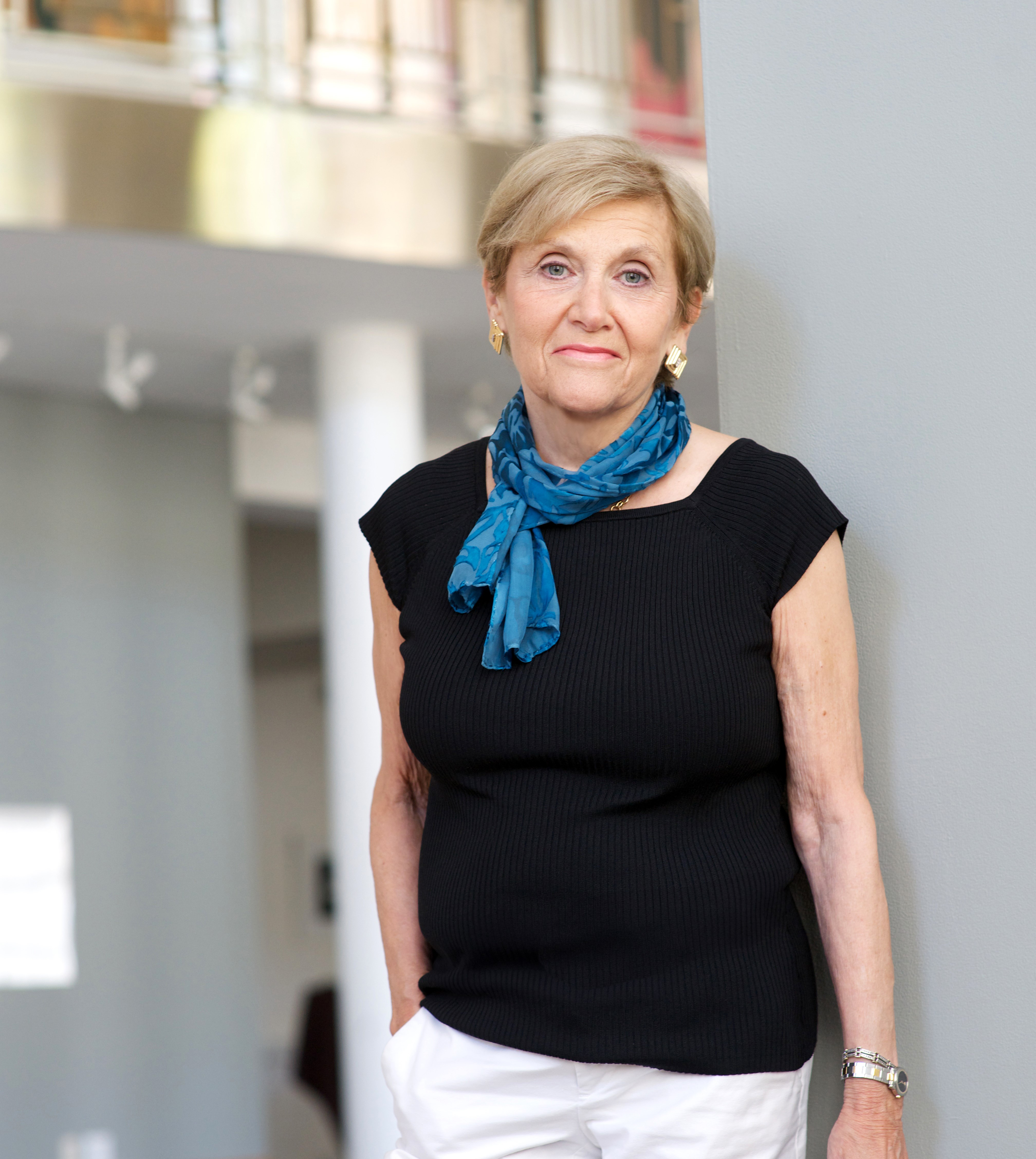
- Born: March 22, 1935 (age 91); Far Rockaway
- Education: Syracuse University; Wagner Graduate School of Public Service; New York University
- Occupations: Cultural activist; art administrator; Journalist

Janet Langsam is an American cultural activist, artist and journalist with more than 50 years’ experience as an arts administrator.

She is a proponent of artist housing in New York City and an activist in the city's movement to decentralize city government.

She also served as the deputy commissioner of cultural affairs in a newly established Department of Cultural Affairs agency under New York City Mayors Abe Beame and Ed Koch.

In that capacity, She brought together cultural representatives from the 50 US cities in a 1975 symposium, which continues today as the USUAF under the auspices of Americans for the Arts.

== Early life and education ==
She was born and raised in Far Rockaway. After attending Syracuse University, she received her B.S. degree from New York University as well as an M.P.A. from New York University's Wagner Graduate School of Public Administration. Langsam studied painting in the 1960s at NYU where two artists were fundamental in the development of her artistic practice: Gregorio Prestopino, and Leo Manso, an abstract painter and collagist.

She has shown her own abstract paintings in The Loeb Student Center at New York University.

== Career ==
She began her career as a journalist working as a reporter for The Long Island Press and a copy editor for House Beautiful Magazine.

Early on, Langsam was active in public service as the chairman of the Community Board 7 in Northern Queens and then as district manager for the Rockaways in the Office of Neighborhood Government during New York City's John Lindsay's Administration.

She served as first deputy commissioner of the NYC Department of Cultural Affairs under New York City mayors Abe Beame and Ed Koch and as assistant housing commissioner in the Koch administration developing artist home ownership in New York City.

She also worked as president and chief executive of Boston Center of the Arts prior to joining ArtsWestchester.

In 1991, she joined ArtsWestchester (formerly known as Council of Arts in Westchester), Under her tenure, ArtsWestchester developed into a $6 million agency annually.

She collaborated with the New York State Thruway on a project to commission 10 major works of public art on the shared use path of the new Governor Mario M. Cuomo Bridge.

As Community Board chairman in Queens, she held the first local budget hearings which led to the funding and founding of the Queens Museum of which she served as board chairman.

She was recognized by the Queens Museum, the Queens Theatre in the Park and was awarded the Americans for the Arts Michael Newton Award and the Selina Roberts Ottum Leadership Award.
