= Benjamin Brown (developer) =

- בנימין ליפשיץ
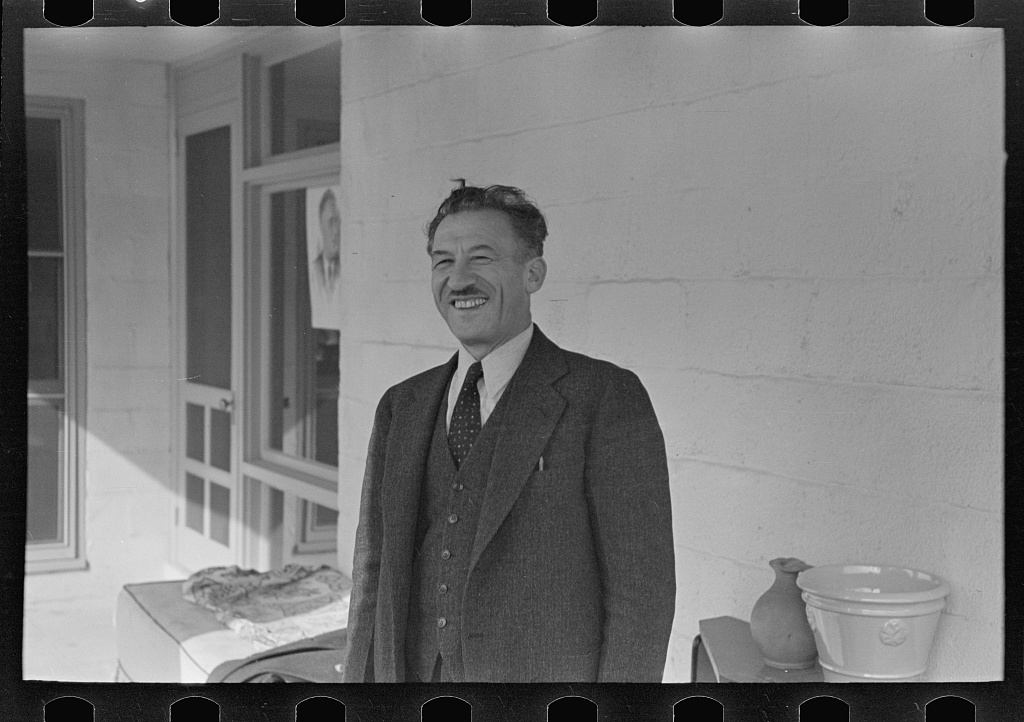
- Brown in 1936
- Born: Benjamin Lipschitz; 1885; Tuchyn, Volhynia Governorate, Russian Empire
- Died: 1939; New Jersey, United States
- Known for: Establishment of Roosevelt, New Jersey

Benjamin Brown (né Lipschitz) (Yiddish: בנימין ליפשיץ) (1885 – 1939), was a Ukrainian-Jewish immigrant to the United States, a social idealist who developed a Jewish Agricultural cooperative settlement in Clarion, Utah, and an Agro-Industrial cooperative settlement in Jersey Homesteads, Roosevelt, New Jersey.

Brown attained wealth through a poultry exchange he established between Western states and New York after the failure of the Clarion effort in 1916. In 1933, Brown attempted to reestablish a new Jewish cooperative effort in rural Monmouth County, N.J. employing seasonally employed Jewish textile workers largely from New York City.

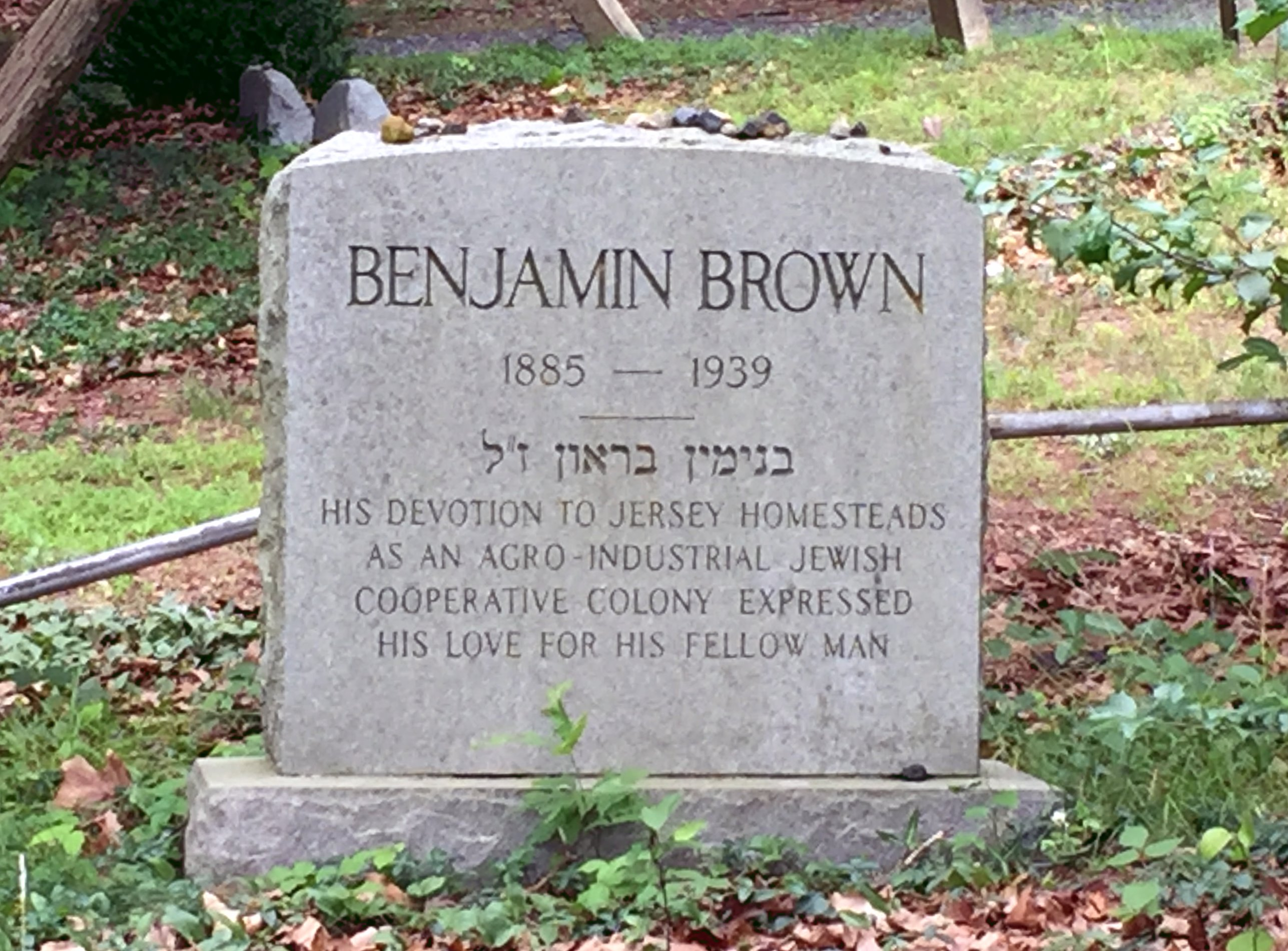
Brown's gravesite in Roosevelt, New Jersey
