= East Windsor Regional School District =

School district in Mercer County, New Jersey, US

Address
- 25A Leshin Lane Hightstown, Mercer County, New Jersey, 08520; United States
- Coordinates: 40.259159°N 74.528208°W

District information
- Grades: PreK to 12
- Superintendent: Mark Daniels
- Business administrator: Paul Todd
- Schools: 6

Students and staff
- Enrollment: 5,138 (as of 2022–23)
- Faculty: 450.0 FTEs
- Student–teacher ratio: 11.4:1

Other information
- District Factor Group: GH
- Website: www.ewrsd.org
Ind.	Per pupil	District spending	Rank (*)	K-12 average	%± vs. average
1A	Total Spending	$17,564	38	$18,891	−7.0%
1	Budgetary Cost	13,793	38	14,783	−6.7%
2	Classroom Instruction	8,695	53	8,763	−0.8%
6	Support Services	1,952	26	2,392	−18.4%
8	Administrative Cost	1,212	15	1,485	−18.4%
10	Operations & Maintenance	1,539	42	1,783	−13.7%
13	Extracurricular Activities	254	53	268	−5.2%
16	Median Teacher Salary	72,245	86	64,043
Data from NJDoE 2014 Taxpayers' Guide to Education Spending. *Of K-12 districts with more than 3,500 students. Lowest spending=1; Highest=103

The East Windsor Regional School District is a comprehensive regional public school district in Mercer County, in the U.S. state of New Jersey, which serves students in pre-kindergarten through twelfth grade from East Windsor and Hightstown.

As of the 2022–23 school year, the district, comprised of six schools, had an enrollment of 5,138 students and 450.0 classroom teachers (on an FTE basis), for a student–teacher ratio of 11.4:1.

The district had been classified by the New Jersey Department of Education as being in District Factor Group "GH", the third-highest of eight groupings. District Factor Groups organize districts statewide to allow comparison by common socioeconomic characteristics of the local districts. From lowest socioeconomic status to highest, the categories are A, B, CD, DE, FG, GH, I and J.

Public school students in seventh through twelfth grades from Roosevelt Borough (a community in Monmouth County) are sent to the district's schools as part of a sending/receiving relationship with the Roosevelt Public School District.

== Awards and recognition ==
Fourteen EWRSD teachers were selected to participate in Princeton University's "Teachers as Scholars" Program (TAS) for the 2005–2006 school year. Started at Harvard University in 1996 and brought to Princeton in 2000, the TAS program offers a variety of seminars and workshops for school district teachers in a university setting, taught by the faculty and staff of Princeton University.

== Schools ==
Schools in the district (with 2022–23 enrollment data from the National Center for Education Statistics) are:

Elementary schools

- Walter C. Black Elementary School with 480 students in grades K-2
  - Heather Gladkowski, principal
- Ethel McKnight Elementary School with 589 students in grades K-2
  - Nicole Foulks, principal
- Perry L. Drew Elementary School with 579 students in grades 3-5
  - Jazmyn Allen, principal
- Grace N. Rogers Elementary School with 611 students in grades PreK / 3-5
  - Lori Emmerson, principal

Middle school

- Melvin H. Kreps Middle School with 1,176 students in grades 6-8
  - Alba Lugo, principal

High school

- Hightstown High School with 1,644 students in grades 9-12
  - Dennis M. Vinson Jr., principal

== Administration ==
Core members of the district's administration are:

- Mark Daniels, superintendent of schools
- Paul Todd, business administrator / board secretary

== Board of Education ==
The district's board of education, comprised of nine members, sets policy and oversees the fiscal and educational operation of the district through its administration. As a Type II school district, the board's trustees are elected directly by voters to serve three-year terms of office on a staggered basis, with three seats up for election each year held (since 2012) as part of the November general election. The board appoints a superintendent to oversee the district's day-to-day operations and a business administrator to supervise the business functions of the district. The seats on the board of education are allocated based on the population of the constituent municipalities, with seven seats assigned to East Windsor and two to Hightstown.
