= Nicholas Marsicano =

American painter

Nicolas Marsicano
- Born: October 1, 1908; Shenandoah, PA
- Died: January 1991 (aged 82); Woodstock, NY
- Occupations: Painter and teacher

Nicholas Marsicano (1908 – 1991) was an American painter and teacher of the New York School. His work was primarily based on the female figure.

== Life ==
Marsicano was born October 1, 1908, in Shenandoah, Pennsylvania. He was educated at the Pennsylvania Academy of the Fine Arts, Philadelphia, and later was accepted at the nearby Barnes Foundation, along with Ralston Crawford. During his years at the Barnes, Marsicano traveled to Europe and North Africa, Mexico, and United States.

Marsicano befriended many artists of his time including Mark Rothko, Jackson Pollock, Franz Kline, Raoul Hague, Phillip Guston, and others.

During his teaching career, his students included Tom Wesselmann, Eva Hesse, Audrey Flack, Milton Glaser, Joan Semmel, Mel Leipzig, Thomas Nozkowski, and more.

He was awarded a Guggenheim Fellowship in 1974.

Marsicano was married to the dancer and choreographer Merle Marsicano. He later married painter Susan Kamen. .

He died at his home in Woodstock, New York, on January 6, 1991, at the age of 82.

== Major shows ==
- 1960-62 Whitney Museum of American Art Annuale, New York
- 1962 Recent Painting U.S.A.: The Figure, May 23–Aug 26, The Museum of Modern Art, New York
- 1961-63 "Abstract American Drawings and Watercolors", The Museum of Modern Art, New York

== Major collections ==
- Amarillo Museum of Art
- The Art Institute, Chicago
- Kresge Art Museum, Michigan State University, East Lansing, Michigan
- The Figge Art Museum, Davenport, Iowa
- General Services Administration; Washington, DC.

Museum of Modern Art, NYC

== Teaching ==
- Cooper Union
- Yale University
- University of Michigan
- Brooklyn Museum School
- Pratt Institute
- Cornell University
- Silvermine College of Fine Arts
- Davenport Municipal Art Gallery, Iowa
- State University of New York at Purchase

== See also ==
- Art movement
- Abstract expressionism
- New York School
- American Figurative Expressionism
- New York Figurative Expressionism
- Stable Gallery
