= Bernarda Bryson Shahn =

American painter and lithographer (1903–2004)

- Bernarda Bryson Shahn in 1960
- Born: Bernarda Bryson; March 7, 1903; Athens, Ohio, US
- Died: December 12, 2004 (aged 101); Roosevelt, New Jersey, US
- Known for: Painting, Lithography, Illustration
- Spouse: Ben Shahn (m. 1935; 3 children)

Bernarda Bryson Shahn (March 7, 1903 – December 12, 2004) was an American painter and lithographer. She also wrote and illustrated children's books including The Zoo of Zeus and Gilgamesh. The artist Ben Shahn was her "life companion" and they married in 1969, shortly before his death.

== Personal life ==
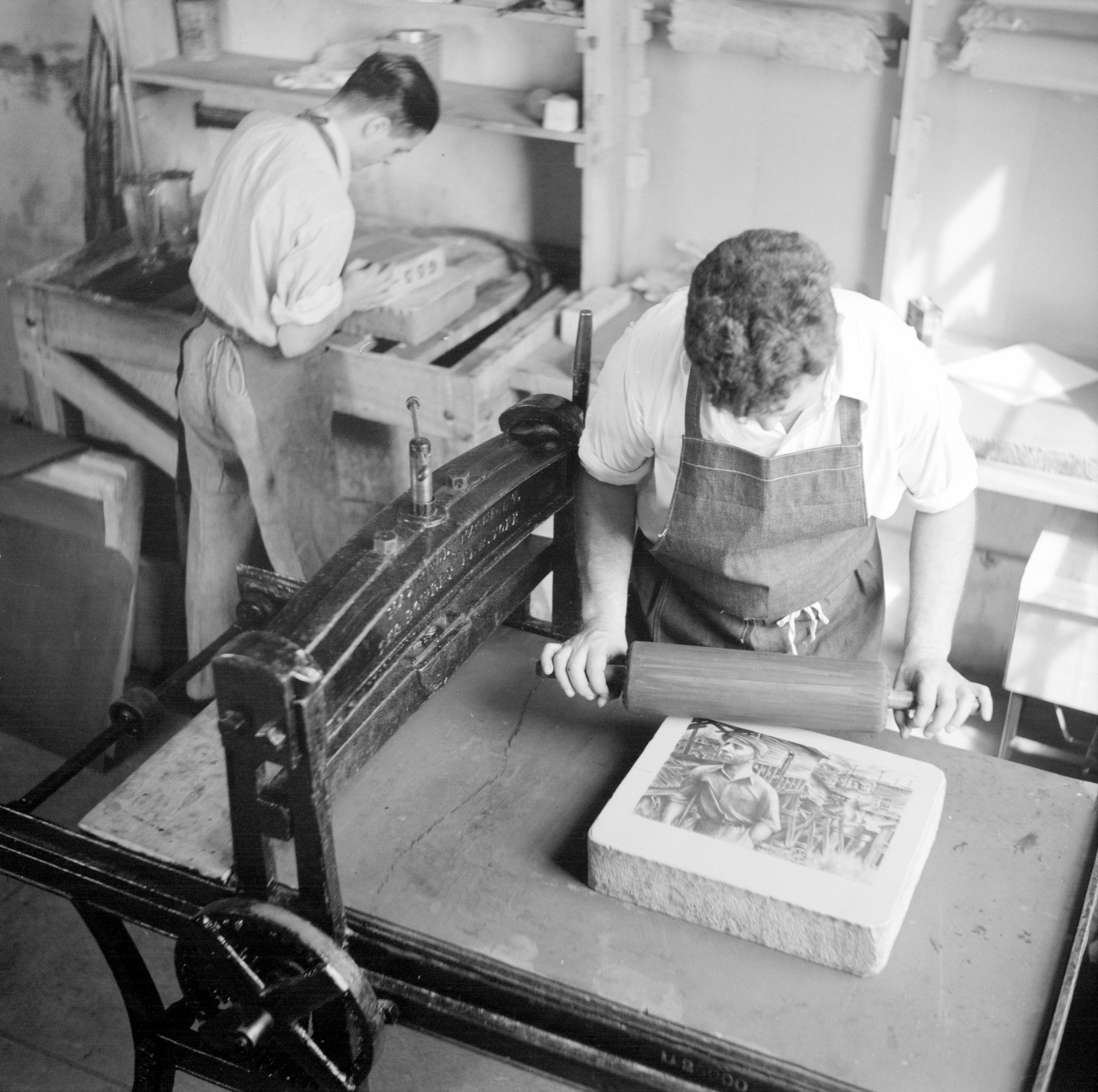
Printing the lithograph Stranded Mines in the Resettlement Administration's Special Skills Division studio in Washington, D.C. (September 1936)

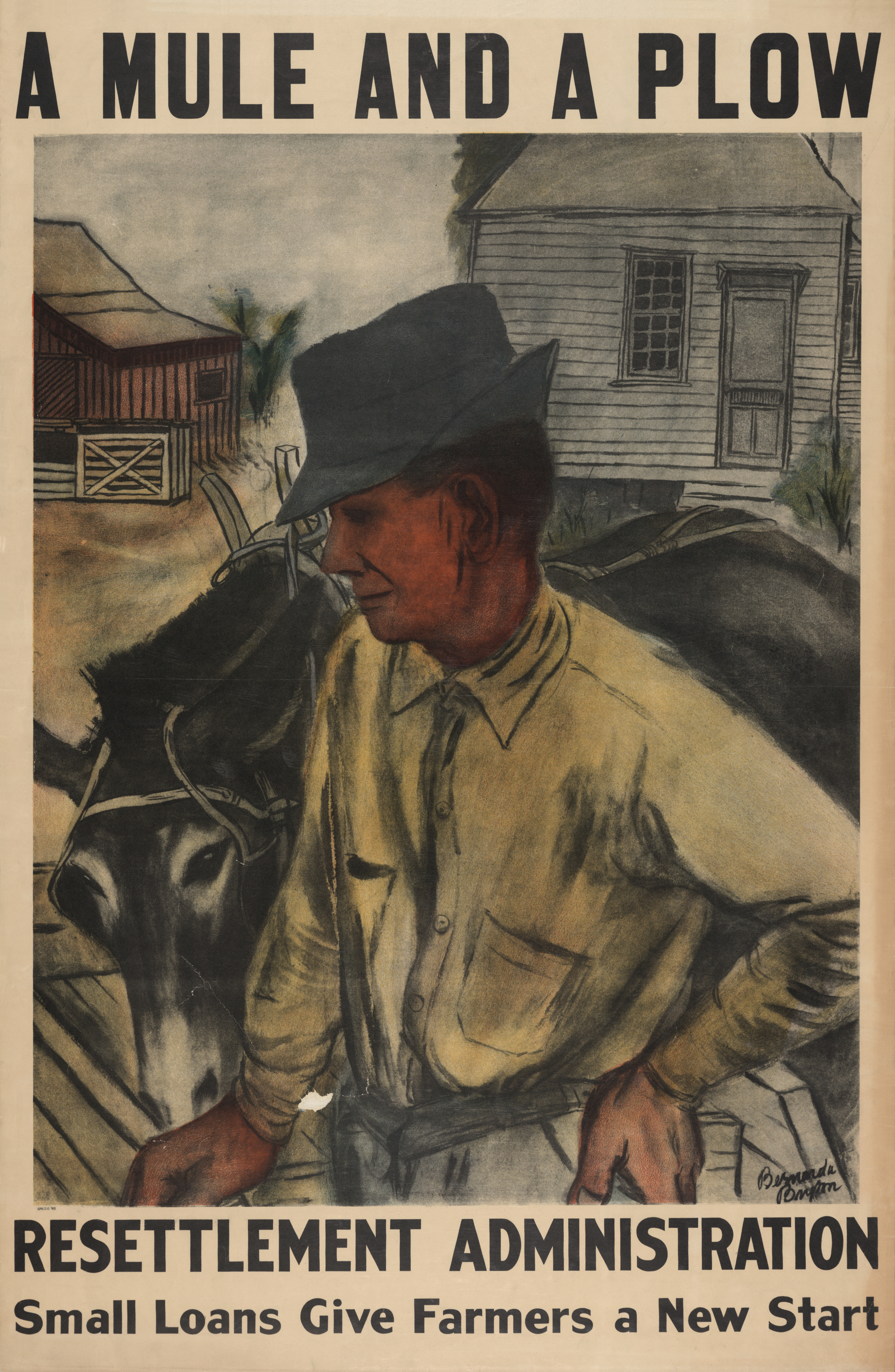
Resettlement Administration poster by Bernarda Bryson Shahn (c. 1936)

Bernarda Bryson was born in Athens, Ohio, where her father owned the Athens Morning Journal and her mother was a Latin professor. Both of her parents were politically active and liberal. Her maternal grandfather was also politically active, with his home a stop on the underground railroad. In Ohio, she studied art, including etching, and art history at several schools including Ohio University, Ohio State University, and the Cleveland School of Art, and learned lithography from a friend. She married young, divorced, and then worked for a newspaper in Columbus, the Ohio State Journal, writing about art news, and teaching printmaking for the museum school at the Columbus Museum of Art. On a trip to New York in 1932 (or 1933) to interview Diego Rivera, during the production of his Rockefeller Center murals, she met his assistant Ben Shahn. After moving to New York shortly after completing the interview, Bryson reconnected with Shahn and they moved to Washington, DC. Bryson and Shahn had three children together and eventually settled in Roosevelt, New Jersey. She died at her home in Roosevelt at the age of 101 on December 12, 2004.

== Career ==
Already a trained printmaker, Bryson worked for the Depression-era Resettlement Administration, later part of the Farm Security Administration on a project with Shahn in the 1930s to document rural life. Her lithographs from this series were first printed in the studio she and Shahn established in Washington for the Resettlement Administration and published in full in 1995 as The Vanishing American Frontier. In 1939, Bryson and Shahn produced a set of 13 murals for the Treasury Department Art Project's Section of Fine Arts entitled Resources of America inspired by Walt Whitman's poem "I See America Working" and installed at the United States Post Office-Bronx Central Annex. Bryson worked primarily as an illustrator beginning in the 1940s, producing works for Harpers as well as Life, Seventeen, and Scientific American, and later for several children's books. These included "Zoo of Zeus" in 1964 and "Gilgamesh in 1967". Her illustrations of the Princeton University Eating Club and of Senator Taft as he is groomed for his 1948 Republican Presidential Candidacy exemplify her minimalistic representation of satire and straightforward style. She continued painting throughout her life in a figurative style often with references to Classical mythology, and she worked was exhibited in solo shows at galleries in New York and New Jersey. Her paintings are owned by collections including the Whitney Museum of Art.
