= Ezio Martinelli =

American artist (1913–1980)

- Born: November 27, 1913; Hoboken, New Jersey, US
- Died: 1980; Saugerties, New York, US
- Known for: Painting, sculpture
- Movement: Abstract expressionism; New York Figurative Expressionism

Ezio Martinelli (November 27, 1913 – 1980) was an American artist who belonged to the New York School Abstract Expressionist artists, a leading art movement of the post-World War II era.

== Biography ==
Martinelli was born on November 27, 1913, in West Hoboken, New Jersey. He studied at the Academy of Fine Arts, Bologna. He returned to the US and 1932–1936 studied at the National Academy of Design, NYC with Leon Kroll & Gifford Beal, drawing with Ivan Olinsky, and sculpture with long-time sculpture teacher, Robert Aiken.

Martinelli's taught at several universities from 1946 through 1975 including the Pennsylvania Museum and School of Industrial Art, Parsons School of Design, and Sarah Lawrence College. He was associated with the New York studio Atelier 17 from the late 1940s through the early 1950s.

He died in 1980.

== Teaching positions ==
- 1946–1949: Graphic Arts at the Philadelphia Museum School; Pennsylvania School of Industrial Arts, Pennsylvania;
- 1949–1975: Painting and Sculpture at Sarah Lawrence College, Bronxville, New York;
- 1954–1957: Graphic Arts Parsons School of Design, NYC;
- 1964–1965: American Academy in Rome, Rome, Italy, Sculptor-in—residence;
- 1969: Graphic Arts and Sculpture class at Skowhegan School of Painting and Sculpture, Maine, (summer).
- 1971: Sculpture Class at Sarah Lawrence College Summer Program in Lacoste, France

== Federal Art Project WPA ==
- 1937–1941: easel painter and unit supervisor.

== Selected solo exhibitions ==
- 1943: Philip Regan Gallery, Pennsylvania;
- 1946, 47, 52, 55, 57, 59, 64, 66: The Willard Gallery, NYC;
- 1956, 68: Seattle Art Museum, Seattle, Washington;
- 1956: Weisman Art Museum, Minneapolis, Minnesota;
- 1962: Art Institute of Chicago, Chicago, Illinois;
- 1968: University of Minnesota; Benson Gallery, East Hampton, New York.

== Selected group exhibitions ==
- 1934: Society of Independent Artists, NYC;
- 1936: Federal Art Project Gallery, NYC;
- 1939: ACA Gallery, NYC;
- 1940: Pennsylvania Academy of Fine Art, – annuals;
- 1941: American Drawing Annual, Albany Institute of Art and History, New York; 20th International Exhibition of Watercolors, Art Institute of Chicago; Elgin Academy of Fine Art, Illinois; San Diego Fine Art Society, California; Denver Art Museum, Colorado;
- 1942, 43, 44: Peggy Guggenheim's, The Art of This Century Gallery, Spring Salon for Younger Artists, NYC; San Francisco Art Association, California;
- 1943: Newark Museum, Newark, New Jersey;
- 1944: Philadelphia Print Club;
- 1947: Corcoran Gallery of Art, Washington, D.C. – biennial; International Watercolor Show, Brooklyn Museum, New York City; "Abstract and Surrealist Art in America," Art Institute of Chicago;
- 1947, 58, 67: Pennsylvania Academy of Fine Arts, – annuals;
- 1948, 56, 60, 62, 64, 66, : Whitney Museum of American Art, Annuals; 1949: Brooklyn Museum, New York City;
- 1952: Drawings From Twelve Countries, Art Institute of Chicago; 1955, 56: American Watercolors in France, Paris;
- 1956: Walker Art Center, Minneapolis, Minnesota; American Federation of Arts, New York City; "Monumentality in Modern Sculpture," Contemporary Arts Museum Houston, Texas;
- 1957: "Irons in the Fire: An Exhibition of Metal Sculpture/Contemporary Arts Museum, Houston, Texas. October 17th–Dec. 1st, 1957"; "Eight American Artists – Contemporaries Abroad – Europe Edition", circ., sponsored by State Department; "Major Work in Minor Scale," American Federation of Arts, New York City;
- 1959: "Carnegie International," Carnegie International Pittsburgh, Pennsylvania; Katonah Museum of Art, Katonah, New York;
- 1959, 66: National Institute of Arts and Letters, New York City;
- 1960: "Aspect de la Sculpture Americaine," Galerie Bernard, Paris France; "Business Buys American Art: Third Loan Exhibition by the Friends of the Whitney Museum of American Art," Whitney Museum of American Art. New York City;
- 1962: "The Architectural League of New York – National Gold Medal Exhibition of the Building Arts; A Survey of American Sculpture: Late 18th Century to 1962," The Newark Museum, NJ;
- 1964: "Westside Artists," Riverside Art Museum, New York City;
- 1965: "Major 19th and 20th Century Drawings," Gallery of Modern Art, NYC; "White on White," DeCordova Museum, Lincoln, Nebraska; "The Drawing Society National Exhibition 1965," American Federation of Arts, New York City;
- 1966: "Made of Iron," Fine Arts Gallery, University of St. Thomas, Houston, Texas;
- 1971: "Modern Sculptors – Their Drawings, Watercolors," Storm King Art Center, Mountainville, New York.

== Works in museums and public collections ==
- The Art Institute of Chicago, Chicago, Illinois
- Frederick R. Weisman Art Museum, Minneapolis, Minnesota
- Georgia Museum of Art, Athens, Georgia
- Hofstra, Hempstead, New York
- Neuberger Museum of Art, Purchase, New York
- New York Public Library, New York City, New York
- Philadelphia Museum of Art, Philadelphia, Pennsylvania
- Seattle Art Museum, Seattle, Washington,
- Solomon R. Guggenheim Museum, New York City, New York
- Brooklyn Museum of Art, Brooklyn, New York
- Hudson River Museum, Yonkers, NY
- John & Mable Ringling Museum of Art, Sarasota, Florida
- The Newark Museum, Newark, New Jersey
- Whitney Museum of American Art, New York City, New York
- Woodstock Artists Association, Woodstock, New York
- Seamon Park, Saugerties, New York
- United Nations, New York City

== See also ==
- New York School
- Action painting
- Abstract expressionism
- Expressionism
- American Figurative Expressionism
- New York Figurative Expressionism

== Books ==
- Marika Herskovic, American Abstract and Figurative Expressionism Style Is Timely Art Is Timeless (New York School Press, 2009); ISBN 978-0-9677994-2-1, pp. 160–63
