= New York Figurative Expressionism =

Visual arts movement

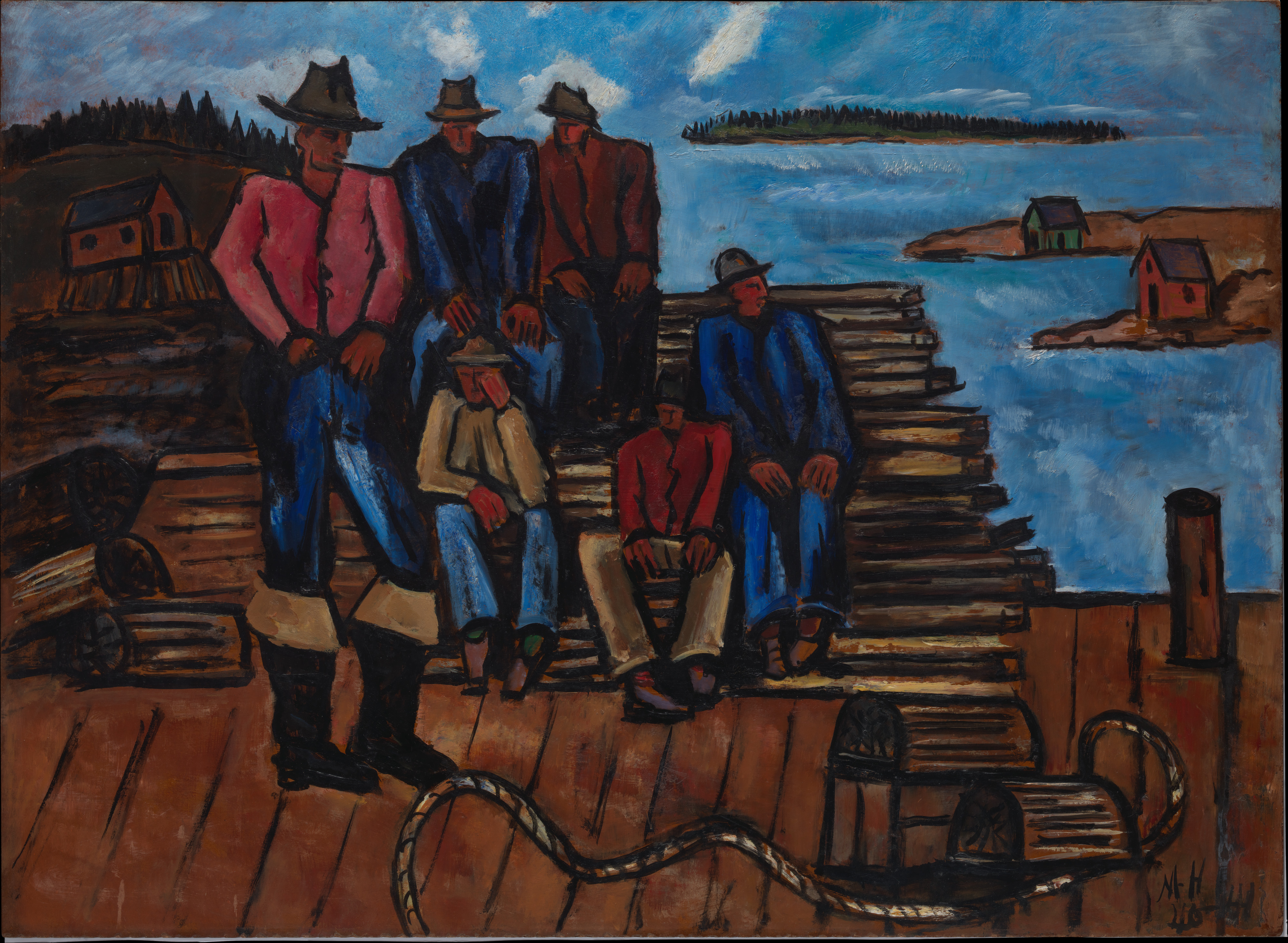
- Marsden Hartley's 1941 painting of "Lobster Fishermen" inspired by fishermen from his home state of Maine.
- Years active: Beginning in the 1930s, reaching a height in the 1950s-1960s, but with practitioners still working in the style today
- Location: United States
- Major figures: Artists Max Weber, Marsden Hartley, Milton Avery, Edwin Dickinson
- Influences: German Expressionism is the most direct influence, but representational painting has roots in Old Master and history painting

New York Figurative Expressionism is a visual arts movement and a branch of American Figurative Expressionism. Though the movement dates to the 1930s, it was not formally classified as "figurative expressionism" until the term arose as a counter-distinction to the New York–based postwar movement known as Abstract Expressionism.

Commenters like Museum of Contemporary Art of Detroit (MOCAD) curator Klaus Kertess observed that "[o]n the eve of the new abstraction's purge of figuration and its rise to all-encompassing prominence, the figure began to acquire a new and forceful vigor," elsewhere explaining that "[d]uring the late forties and early fifties," figurative work was associated with a conservatism abstractionists sought to avoid. Their response was defensive, and "prone to blur the vast distinctions between figurative painters and to exaggerate the difference between the figurative and the nonfigurative. It was not until the late sixties and early seventies that the figure was permitted to return from exile and even to make claims to centrality." But that was not true of all abstract expressionists. Willem de Kooning (1904–1997) and Jackson Pollock (1912–1956), for example, started incorporating figurative elements far sooner. They, along with abstract expressionist Conrad Marca-Relli (1913–2000) among others, built upon the figure as a framework for expanding their otherwise abstract canvases.

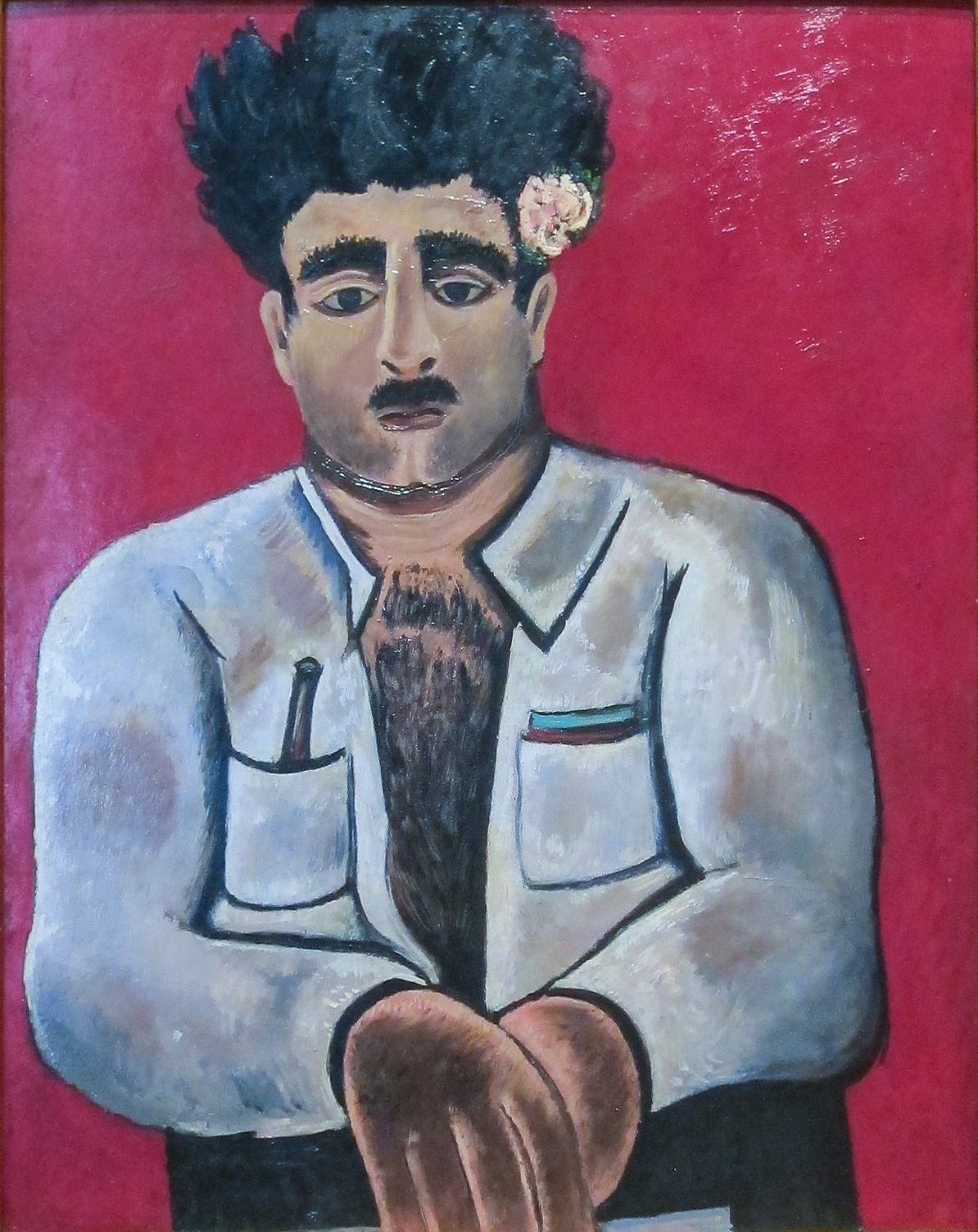
Marsden Hartley's "Adelard the Drowned, Master of the Phantom," 1939.

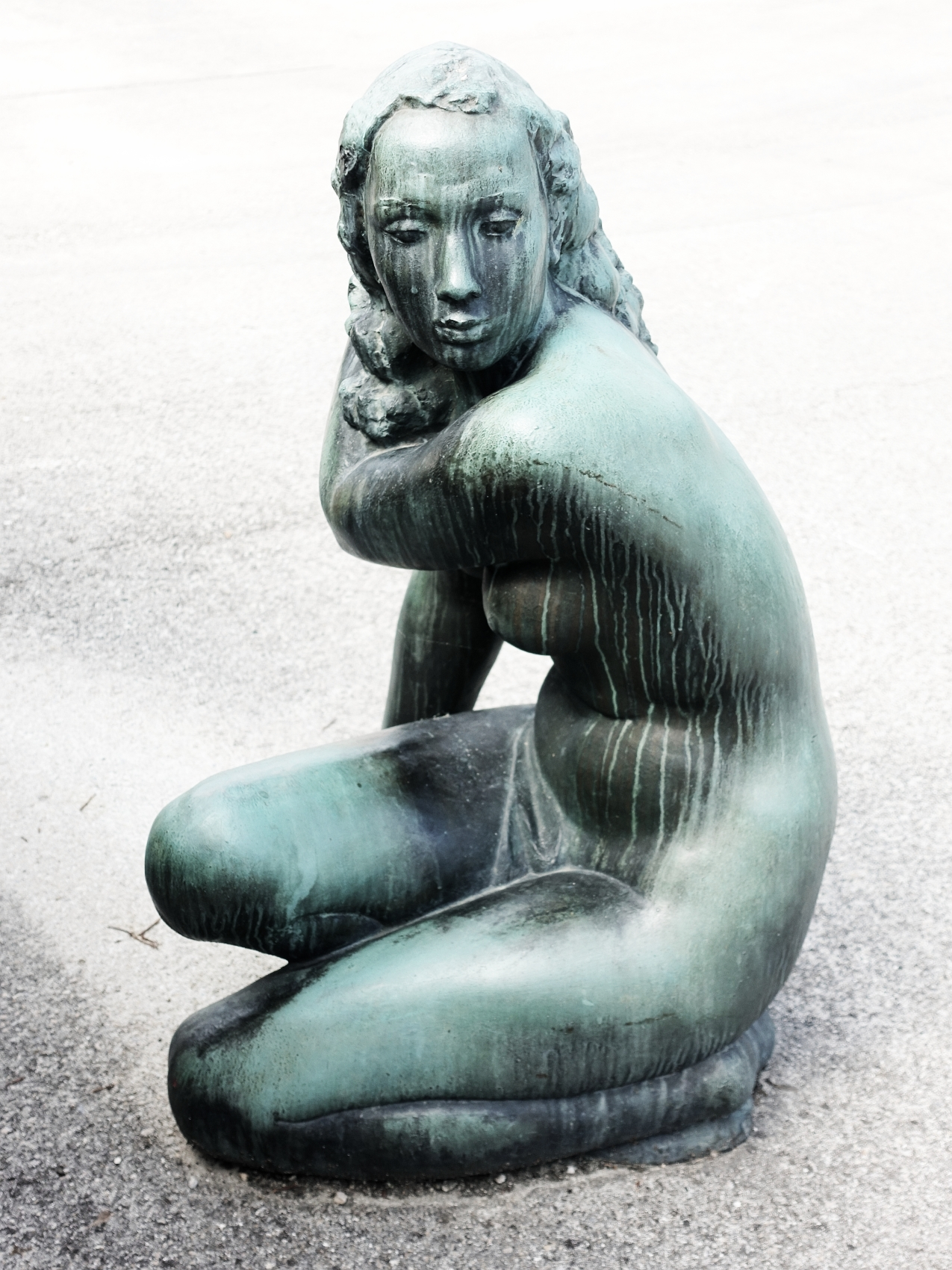
Max Weber's sculpture "Aurora," 1937.

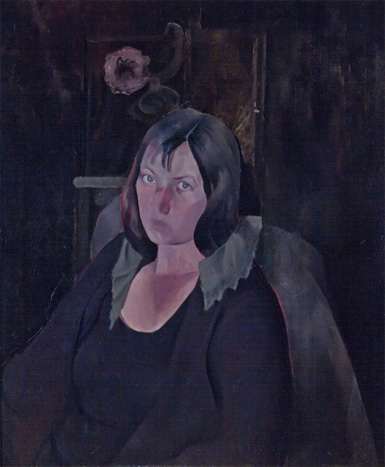
Edwin Dickinson's "Portrait of Biala," 1924.

Early New York figurative expressionists included Max Weber (1881–1961) and Marsden Hartley (1877–1943), known for their work with myth and spirituality. Other early practitioners spanned the lyrical restraint of Milton Avery (1885–1965) and the clear, direct work of Edwin Dickinson (1891–1978).

== Figurative Art during Abstract Expressionism: 1950s ==
The use of the figure was influenced by Old Master and history painting for some of the New York Expressionists, notably Larry Rivers (1923–2002) and Grace Hartigan (1922–). For many others, the figure served as the logical subject of representational portraiture: Elaine de Kooning (1918–1989); Balcomb Greene, (1904–1990); Robert De Niro Sr. (1920–1993); Fairfield Porter, (1907–1975); Gregorio Prestopino (1907–1984); Lester Johnson (1919–2010); George McNeil (1909–1995); Henry Gorski (1918–2010); Robert Goodnough (1917–); and Earle M. Pilgrim (1923–1976).

The figure also served as a stylistic element reminiscent of the German Expressionists, but with the heroic scale of the Abstract Expressionists for many of those with allegorical or mythical interests. Artists in this category included: Jan Müller, (1922–1958); Robert Beauchamp, (1923–1995); Nicholas Marsicano, (1914–1991); Bob Thompson, (1937–1966); Ezio Martinelli, (1913–1980) Irving Kriesberg, (1919–2009).

== Figurative partisans: 1950–1964 ==
"During the war years and into the 1950s," Judith E. Stein writes, "the general public was to remain highly suspicious of abstraction, which many considered un-American. While the art critic Clement Greenberg successfully challenged the public's negative response to abstraction, his attempt to communicate to the New York figurative painters of the fifties was less successful." A conversation recollected by Thomas B. Hess emphasized the perceived power of the critic:"It is impossible today to paint a face, pontificated the critic Clement Greenberg around 1950. "That's right," said de Kooning, "and it's impossible not to."

In 1953, the journal Reality was founded "to rise to the defense of any painter's right to paint any ways he wants." Backing this mission statement was an editorial committee that included Isabel Bishop (1902–1988), Edward Hopper (1882–1967), Jack Levine (1915–2010), Raphael Soyer (1899–1987) and Henry Varnum Poor (1888–1970).

The sculptor Philip Pavia became "partisan publisher" of It is. A Magazine for Abstract Art that he founded in 1958. In an open letter to Leslie Katz, the new publisher of Arts Magazine, he wrote: "I am begging you to give the representational artist a better deal. The neglected representational and near-abstract artists, not the abstractionists, need a champion these days."

Although none of these figurative advocates had the stature of critics like Clement Greenberg or Harold Rosenberg, they were recognized by critics as radicals, "represent[ing] a new generation to whom figurative art was in a sense more revolutionary than abstraction."

The literary historian Marjorie Perloff has made a convincing argument that Frank O'Hara's poems on the works of Garace Hartigan and Larry Rivers proved "that he was really more at home with painting that retains at least some figuration than with pure abstraction." Frank O'Hara wrote an elegant defense in "Nature and New Painting," 1954, listing Grace Hartigan (1922–2008), Larry Rivers (1923–2002), Elaine de Kooning (1918–1989), Jane Freilicher (1924–), Robert De Niro Sr. (1922–1993), Felix Pasilis (1922–), Wolf Kahn (1927–) and Marcia Marcus (1928–) as artists who responded to "the siren-like call of nature." O'Hara aligned the New York Figurative Expressionists within abstract expressionism, which had always taken a strong position against an implied protocol, "whether at the Metropolitan Museum or the Artists Club." Thomas B. Hess wrote: "[T]he 'New figurative painting' which some have been expecting as a reaction against Abstract Expressionism was implicit in it at the start, and is one of its most lineal continuities."

== External links for image reproductions ==
- Willem de Kooning, Woman, I. 1950–52. Oil on canvas, from MoMA.org
- Jackson Pollock, Easter and the Totem. 1953. Oil on canvas from MoMA.org
- Conrad Marca-Relli, Seated Figure, 1953–54 Oil and canvas on linen from artic.edu
- Larry Rivers, Study for George Washington Crossing the Delaware, 1953. Pencil on paper, from MoMA.org
- Grace Hartigan, Homage to Matisse, 1955 oil on canvas from RISD.edu/museum.cfm
- Elaine de Kooning, Fairfield Porter, 1954 oil on canvas from kemperart.org
- 'Robert de Niro Sr., Lola Montez, 1958 – 1959 charcoal and pencil on paper from hirshhorn.si.edu
- Fairfield Porter, Katie and Anne, 1955 oil on canvas from hirshhorn.si.edu
- George McNeil, Jezebel, 1960 oil on canvas from collections.walkerart.org
- Jan Muller, (1922–1958), The Search for the Unicorn, 1957 oil on canvas from michaelrosenfeld.com
- Bob Thompson, Untitled, 1962 oil on canvas from hirshhorn.si.edu
