= Zubin Mehenti =

American sportscaster and radio host

- Born: August 5, 1978 (age 48); East Windsor, New Jersey
- Education: Rutgers University; B.A., Journalism; B.A., Political Science
- Occupation: Sports broadcaster
- Known for: Hosting SportsCenter

Zubin Mehenti is an American sportscaster and radio host. He joined ESPN in 2011 and has served as the anchor for several variations of the channel's flagship program, SportsCenter. Mehenti formerly co-hosted the ESPN Radio morning show titled Keyshawn, JWill and Zubin.

== Early life ==
Mehenti was born on August 5, 1978, in East Windsor, New Jersey. His parents were immigrants from India, making him a first-generation American. He attended Hightstown High School in Hightstown, New Jersey. Mehenti graduated from Rutgers University with a B.A. in journalism and a B.A. in political science.

== Career ==
After graduating from Rutgers, Mehenti was hired as a producer for Melinda Murphy at New York-based station WPIX-TV. He began his career as a reporter with WMGM-TV in Wildwood, New Jersey, serving as a weekend sportscaster. In 2001, Mehenti left the east coast when he was hired as a weekend sportscaster for WOI-DT in Des Moines, Iowa, a positioned he held until 2005. He then worked at KDVR-TV and KWGN-TV in Denver for six years.

In 2011, Mehenti was hired at ESPN. He has primarily worked as the host or co-host of several iterations of SportsCenter. In August 2020, he was selected as a co-host for a ESPN Radio morning program with Keyshawn Johnson and Jay Williams. A year later, Mehenti left the show and returned to SportsCenter. In 2025, Mehenti joined ESPN's College Football Live as a host.

== Personal life ==
Mehenti is a fan of the Rutgers Scarlet Knights sports teams. In an interview, he said that Greg Schiano was one of his favorite sportspeople for improving the Rutgers football program and leading the team to five straight bowl game berths. His favorite hobby is running.
