= Roosevelt Public School District =

School district in Monmouth County, New Jersey, US

Address
- 2A School Lane Roosevelt, Monmouth County, New Jersey, 08555; United States
- Coordinates: 40.22131°N 74.474484°W

District information
- Grades: PreK-5
- Superintendent: Karen Barry (acting)
- Business administrator: Bernard Biesiada
- Schools: 1

Students and staff
- Enrollment: 89 (as of 2022–23)
- Faculty: 8.0 FTEs
- Student–teacher ratio: 11.1:1

Other information
- District Factor Group: GH
- Website: www.rps1.org
| Ind. | Per pupil | District spending | Rank (*) | K-6 average | %± vs. average |
|---|---|---|---|---|---|
| 1A | Total Spending | $20,231 | 49 | $18,891 | 7.1% |
| 1 | Budgetary Cost | 16,252 | 45 | 13,649 | 19.1% |
| 2 | Classroom Instruction | 10,120 | 45 | 8,366 | 21.0% |
| 6 | Support Services | 1,846 | 16 | 2,161 | −14.6% |
| 8 | Administrative Cost | 1,801 | 40 | 1,467 | 22.8% |
| 10 | Operations & Maintenance | 2,468 | 55 | 1,552 | 59.0% |
| 13 | Extracurricular Activities | 17 | 14 | 39 | −56.4% |
| 16 | Median Teacher Salary | 47,581 | 3 | 57,437 |
Data from NJDoE 2014 Taxpayers' Guide to Education Spending. *Of K-6 districts with any number of students. Lowest spending=1; Highest=59

The Roosevelt Public School District is a community public school district that serves students in pre-kindergarten through fifth grade from Roosevelt in Monmouth County, in the U.S. state of New Jersey.

As of the 2022–23 school year, the district, comprised of one school, had an enrollment of 89 students and 8.0 classroom teachers (on an FTE basis), for a student–teacher ratio of 11.1:1. In the 2016–17 school year, Roosevelt had the 6th-smallest enrollment of any school district in the state, with 88 students.

The district is classified by the New Jersey Department of Education as being in District Factor Group "GH", the third-highest of eight groupings. District Factor Groups organize districts statewide to allow comparison by common socioeconomic characteristics of the local districts. From lowest socioeconomic status to highest, the categories are A, B, CD, DE, FG, GH, I and J.

For sixth through twelfth grades, public school students attend the East Windsor Regional School District, which serves students from East Windsor Township and Hightstown Borough, with students from Roosevelt attending as part of a sending/receiving relationship. Schools in the East Windsor district attended by Roosevelt students (with 2021–22 enrollment data from the National Center for Education Statistics) are Melvin H. Kreps Middle School with 1,194 students in grades 6–8 and Hightstown High School with 1,621 students in grades 9–12.

== Schools ==
- Roosevelt Public School had an enrollment of 82 students in grades PreK-6 in the 2021–22 school year.
  - Gina Morrone, principal, replacing Mary Robinson Cohen

== Administration ==
Core members of the district's administration as of October 2023 are:

- Karen Barry, acting superintendent
- Gina Morrone, principal
- Bernard Biesiada, business administrator and board secretary

== Board of education ==
The district's board of education, comprised of nine members, sets policy and oversees the fiscal and educational operation of the district through its administration. As a Type II school district, the board's trustees are elected directly by voters to serve three-year terms of office on a staggered basis, with three seats up for election each year held (since 2012) as part of the November general election. The board appoints a superintendent to oversee the district's day-to-day operations and a business administrator to supervise the business functions of the district.
