= Hightstown High School =

High school in New Jersey, United States

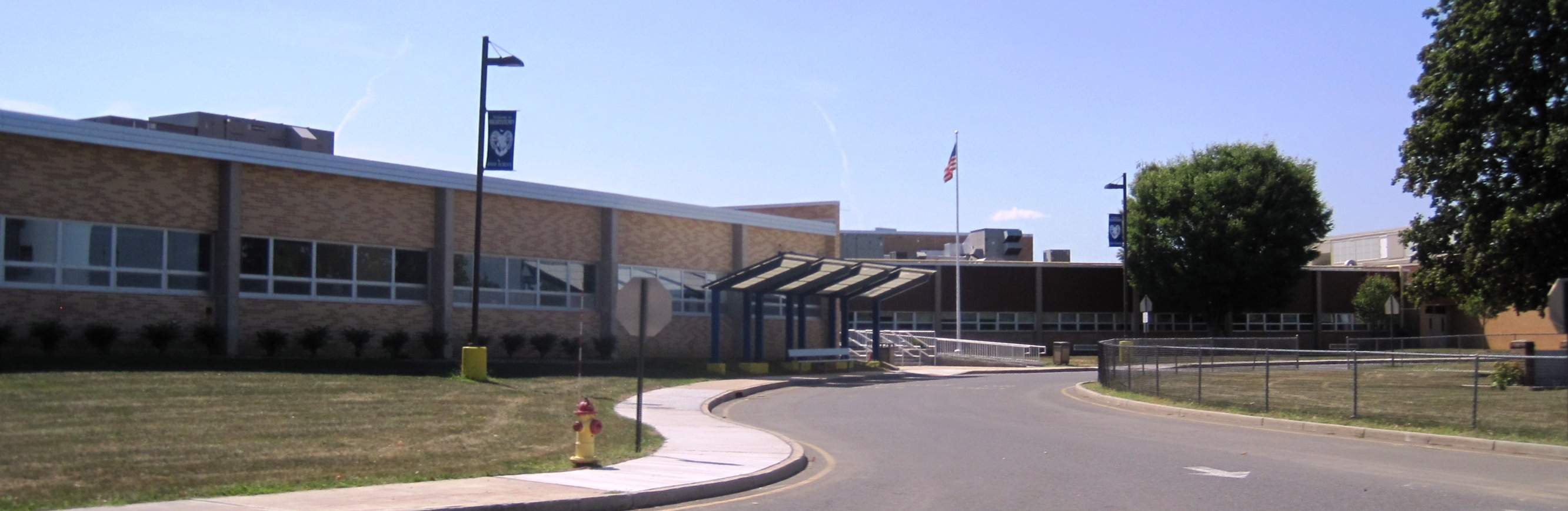
- Main entrance of the school

Location
- 25 Leshin Lane; Hightstown, Mercer County, New Jersey 08520; United States; 40.261°N 74.531°W

Information
- Type: Public high school
- Established: 1913
- School district: East Windsor Regional School District
- NCES School ID: 340432003054
- Principal: Johnathan Dauber
- Faculty: 133.0 FTEs
- Grades: 9-12
- Enrollment: 1,616 (as of 2024–25)
- Student to teacher ratio: 12.2:1
- Colors: Blue and white
- Athletics conference: Colonial Valley Conference (general); West Jersey Football League (football)
- Team name: Rams
- Publication: The Ram Page
- Website: www.ewrsd.org/o/hhs

Hightstown High School is a four-year comprehensive public high school that serves students in ninth through twelfth grades comprised of three communities in Mercer County and Monmouth County, in the U.S. state of New Jersey, operating as part of the East Windsor Regional School District. Students come from East Windsor and Hightstown, both in Mercer County. Students from Roosevelt (a community in western Monmouth County) attend the district's high school as part of a sending/receiving relationship with the Roosevelt Public School District.

The school is approved by the New Jersey Department of Education and is accredited by the Middle States Association of Colleges and Schools.

As of the 2024–25 school year, the school had an enrollment of 1,616 students and 133.0 classroom teachers (on an FTE basis), for a student–teacher ratio of 12.2:1. There were 604 students (37.4% of enrollment) eligible for free lunch and 162 (10.0% of students) eligible for reduced-cost lunch.

== History ==
The inaugural Hightstown High School opened for the 1913-14 school year, before which students in grades 11 and 12 attended Trenton Central High School. With rapid growth in the area, the second high school building opened in January 1925. The third and current school building opened during the 1965–66 school year.

Additions to the original structure were completed in 1973, 1982 and 2005.

Students from Plainsboro Township had attended Hightstown High School until the start of the 1979–80 school year, when they switched to Lawrence High School.

== Awards, recognition and rankings ==
The school was the 126th-ranked public high school in New Jersey out of 339 schools statewide in New Jersey Monthly magazine's September 2014 cover story on the state's "Top Public High Schools", using a new ranking methodology. The school had been ranked 161st in the state of 328 schools in 2012, after being ranked 180th in 2010 out of 322 schools listed. The magazine ranked the school 175th in 2008 out of 316 schools. The school was ranked 119th in the magazine's September 2006 issue, which surveyed 316 schools across the state. Schooldigger.com ranked the school 225th out of 376 public high schools statewide in its 2010 rankings (an increase of 4 positions from the 2009 rank) which were based on the combined percentage of students classified as proficient or above proficient on the language arts literacy and mathematics components of the High School Proficiency Assessment (HSPA).

== Athletics ==
The Hightstown High School Rams compete in the Colonial Valley Conference, which is comprised of public and private high schools in Mercer, Middlesex and Monmouth counties, operating under the supervision of the New Jersey State Interscholastic Athletic Association (NJSIAA). With 1,218 students in grades 10-12, the school was classified by the NJSIAA for the 2019–20 school year as Group IV for most athletic competition purposes, which included schools with an enrollment of 1,060 to 5,049 students in that grade range. The football team competes in the Valley Division of the 94-team West Jersey Football League superconference and was classified by the NJSIAA as Group IV South for football for 2024–2026, which included schools with 890 to 1,298 students.

Interscholastic sports include cross country, football, soccer, field hockey, cheerleading, wrestling, indoor track and field, basketball, swimming, ice hockey, baseball, softball, tennis, golf, and lacrosse.

The school participates with Ewing High School in a joint ice hockey team in which Lawrence High School is the host school / lead agency. The co-op program with Ewing High School and Lawrence High School operates under an agreement renewed through June 30, 2028.

The boys' soccer team was awarded the Group I state championship in 1946 (declared as co-champion with Chatham High School), 1947, 1949, 1950, 1951 (won vs. Harrison High School), 1956, 1957 and 1964 (won vs. Harrison), was awarded the Group II title in 1958 and 1959, and won the Group II title in 1961 (vs. Irvington Tech), 1962 (vs. West Morris Central High School) and 1963 (vs. Harrison). The streak of four consecutive titles won from 1961 to 1964 is tied for the third-longest streak in the state. The 1962 team won the Group II title with a 3-1 win against West Morris.

The boys track team won the indoor relay championship in Group I/II in 1971 (as co-champion).

The girls' field hockey team won the Central Jersey Group IV state sectional championship in 1983.

The girls' basketball team won the Group IV state championship in 1987, defeating Bloomfield High School by a score of 59-39 in the tournament final at the Louis Brown Athletic Center.

The ice hockey team won the Mercer County Championship in 1987, 1989, 1994, 1999 (as co-champion with Hopewell Valley Central High School) and 2002.

The softball team finished the season with a 25-4 record in 2019, after winning the Group IV state title with a 9-4 score against runner-up Mount Olive High School in the tournament finals at Kean University.

== Extracurricular activities ==
=== FIRST Robotics Team ===
Hightstown High School is also home to FIRST Robotics Competition Team #1089, Team Mercury. What makes Team Mercury particularly notable is its transition (since 2016) into a more student-centric method to approaching the competition, in which students independently engineer the robot and self-manage, instead of a more mentor-centric approach, in which adult mentors guide students at every step of the process of building the robot. Since the team's inception in 2003, Team Mercury has received a number of awards, including the prestigious Chairman's Award in 2009 and the Engineering Inspiration Award in 2023. The team also participated in the FIRST Robotics FRC World robotics competition in the 2005, 2006, 2007, 2008, 2009, 2014, 2015, 2016, and 2022 seasons. Team Mercury is sponsored by Oracle, Holman Enterprises, Trumpf, Bloomberg, Lockheed Martin, Bristol-Myers Squibb, Abbott Laboratories and the East Windsor Regional School District. In terms of team structure, the team is divided up into different committees, which are known as Build & Mechanical, Programming & Electronics, Public Relations & Marketing, Robot Design & CAD, Spirit & Imagery, and Scouting & Strategy. Each committee has two or three Committee Head team members, depending on the sheer size of the committee and its workload, which serve as managers selected by the Head Coach, Mr. Gregory, for their specialty. Within each committee, there are also sub-committees, such as the Scouting App team for Scouting & Strategy, and project managers, which report to the Committee Head oversee more specific tasks with smaller groups from their committee. There is also a smaller 10-member team named FTC 3944 under the same Head Coach, which competes in the FIRST Tech Challenge, builds a smaller robot for a different field, and tracks their progress using an Engineering Notebook. As a community service opportunity, FRC members can volunteer to mentor any of several FIRST LEGO League teams, which consist of students in grades 4-8 that want to participate in the designing, building & programming of Lego EV3 robots for competition.

=== Hightstown Marching Rams ===
The Marching band competed in the USBands national championships and state championships in Group 3A in 2015 with their field show "España". The band placed 2nd out of 23 in the state championships with a score of 93.663 and placed 3rd out of 27 in the national championships with a score of 96.275 beating Hightstown's record and won the Cadets award for Excellence in Creativity and Overall Effect.

In 2016, the Marching Rams competed in the USBands state championships and national championships, with their field show "Pure Imagination". The band won the state championship title, placed 1st out of 22 bands with a score of 93.500 and won the caption for Best Overall Effect. In the 2016 Group III A National Championships the band placed 4th out of 26 with a score of 94.738.

The Marching Rams have been successful at many competitions in recent years both at a regional, state, and national level. They placed 3rd at the Group IIA National Championships in November 2022.

== Administration ==
The school's principal is Johnathan Dauber. His core administration team includes four assistant principals and the athletic director.

== Notable alumni ==
- Melanie Balcomb (born 1962), head coach of the Ohio Dominican Panthers women's basketball team
- Jim Barlow, two-time high school soccer All-American and current head soccer coach at Princeton University
- William R. Forstchen (born 1950, class of 1968), author and historian
- Hilly Kristal (1931–2007, class of 1949), owner and founder of CBGB
- Marlon LeBlanc (born 1978), former head men's soccer coach at West Virginia University and for Philadelphia Union II
- Doug Mastriano (born 1964, class of 1982), politician who is a retired Colonel of the United States Army and the state senator for Pennsylvania's 33rd District
- Zubin Mehenti (born 1978), sportscaster and radio host who joined ESPN in 2011 and has served as the anchor for several variations of the channel's flagship program, SportsCenter
- Randal Pinkett (born 1971), Chairman and CEO of BCT Partners, Rhodes Scholar and the winner of the reality show, The Apprentice 4
- Paul Prestopino (1939–2023), multi-instrumental musician and audio engineer
- Craig Sechler (born 1951), film and voice actor
- Hollis Sigler (1948–2001), artist
- Ed Whited (born 1964), former Major League Baseball third baseman who played for the Atlanta Braves during the 1989 season
- Barbara Wright (born 1933), politician who represented the 14th Legislative District in the New Jersey General Assembly from 1992 to 2000
