= Roosevelt, New Jersey =

Borough in Monmouth County, New Jersey, US

- Borough
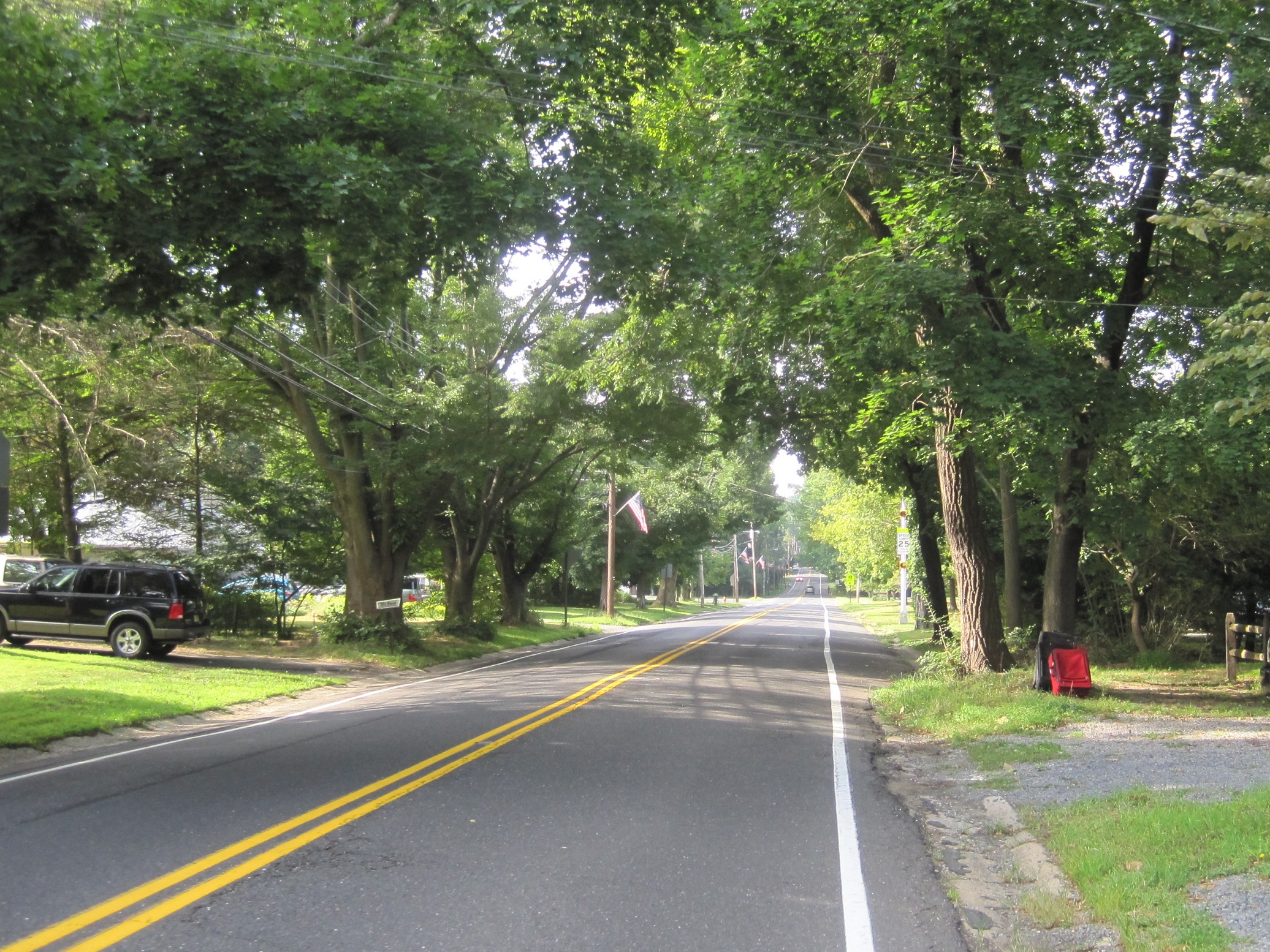
- Rochdale Avenue through Roosevelt

- Flag

- Map of Roosevelt in Monmouth County. Inset: Location of Monmouth County highlighted in the State of New Jersey.

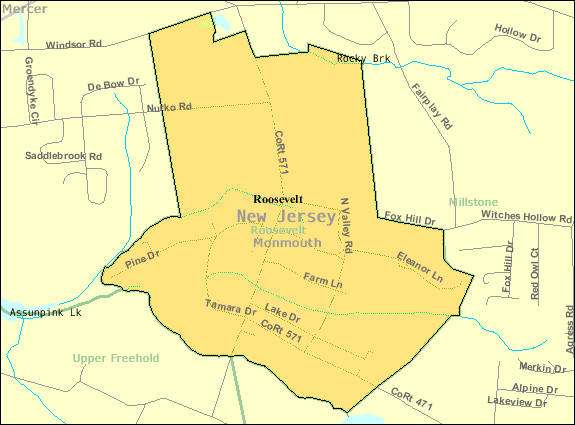
- Census Bureau map of Roosevelt, New Jersey

- Location in Monmouth County Location in New Jersey Location in the United States
- Coordinates: 40.220742°N 74.470155°W
- Country: United States
- State: New Jersey
- County: Monmouth
- Incorporated: May 29, 1937 as Jersey Homesteads
- Renamed: November 9, 1945 as Roosevelt

Government
  - Type: Borough
  - Body: Borough Council
  - Mayor: Peggy Malkin (D, term ends December 31, 2027)
  - Municipal clerk: Kathleen Hart

Area
  - Total: 1.95 sq mi (5.05 km^{2})
  - Land: 1.94 sq mi (5.02 km^{2})
  - Water: 0.0077 sq mi (0.02 km^{2}) 0.46%
  - Rank: 416th of 565 in state 31st of 53 in county
- Elevation: 144 ft (44 m)

Population (2020)
  - Total: 808
  - Estimate (2023): 799
  - Rank: 540th of 565 in state 51st of 53 in county
  - Density: 416.5/sq mi (160.8/km^{2})
  - Rank: 454th of 565 in state 50th of 53 in county
- Time zone: UTC−05:00 (Eastern (EST))
  - Summer (DST): UTC−04:00 (Eastern (EDT))
- ZIP Code: 08555
- Area code: 609
- FIPS code: 3402564410
- GNIS feature ID: 0885377
- Website: rooseveltnj.us

Roosevelt is a borough in western Monmouth County, in the U.S. state of New Jersey. As of the 2020 United States census, the borough's population was 808, a decrease of 74 (−8.4%) from the 2010 census count of 882, which in turn reflected a decline of 51 (−5.5%) from the 933 counted in the 2000 census.

Located at the cross-roads between the Delaware Valley region to the south and the Raritan Valley region to the north in the center of the state, the borough was established as Jersey Homesteads by an act of the New Jersey Legislature on May 29, 1937, from portions of Millstone Township. The name was changed to Roosevelt as of November 9, 1945, based on the results of a referendum held three days earlier, in honor of President Franklin D. Roosevelt, who had died on April 12, 1945.

== History ==
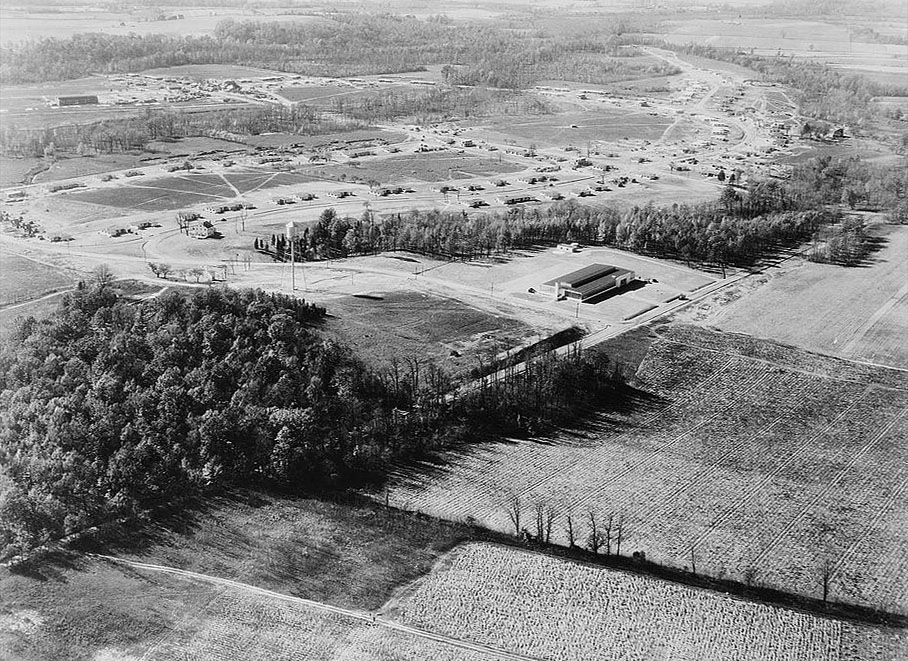
Jersey Homesteads, circa late 1930s

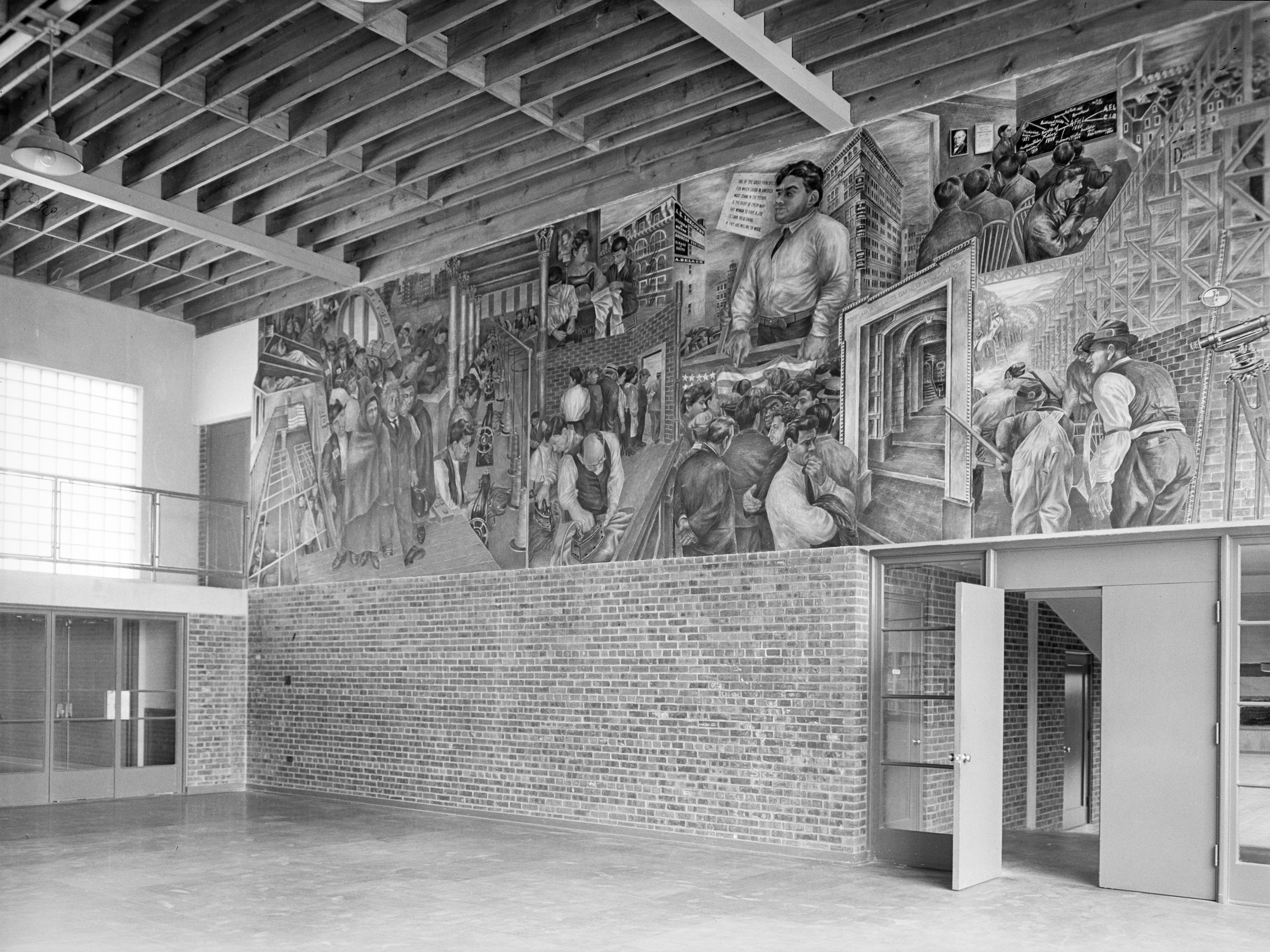
Ben Shahn's untitled fresco for the Jersey Homesteads, completed in 1938

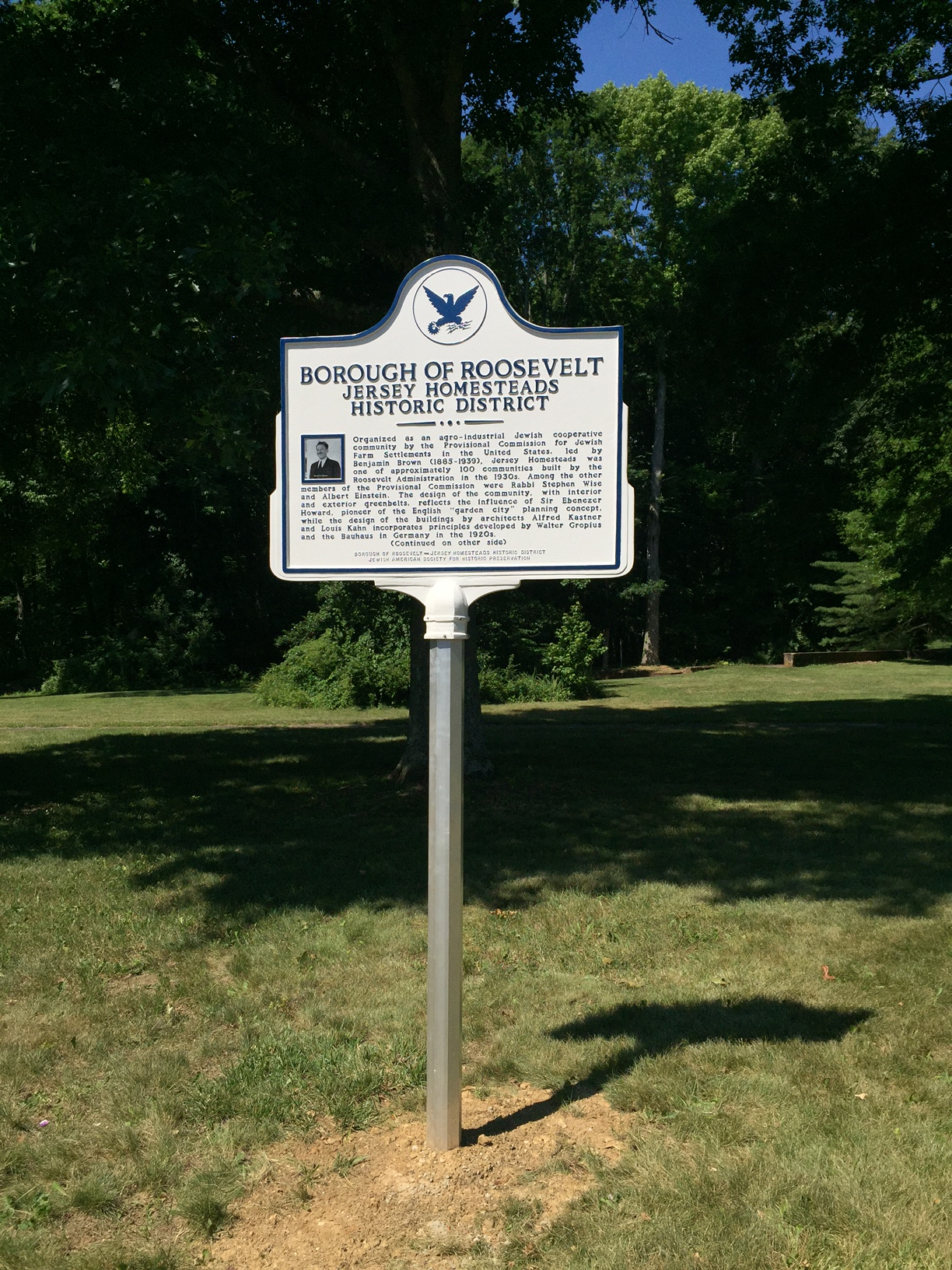
Jewish American Society for Historic Preservation, historic marker in Jersey Homesteads (Roosevelt), N.J.

- Jersey Homesteads Historic District
- U.S. National Register of Historic Places
- New Jersey Register of Historic Places
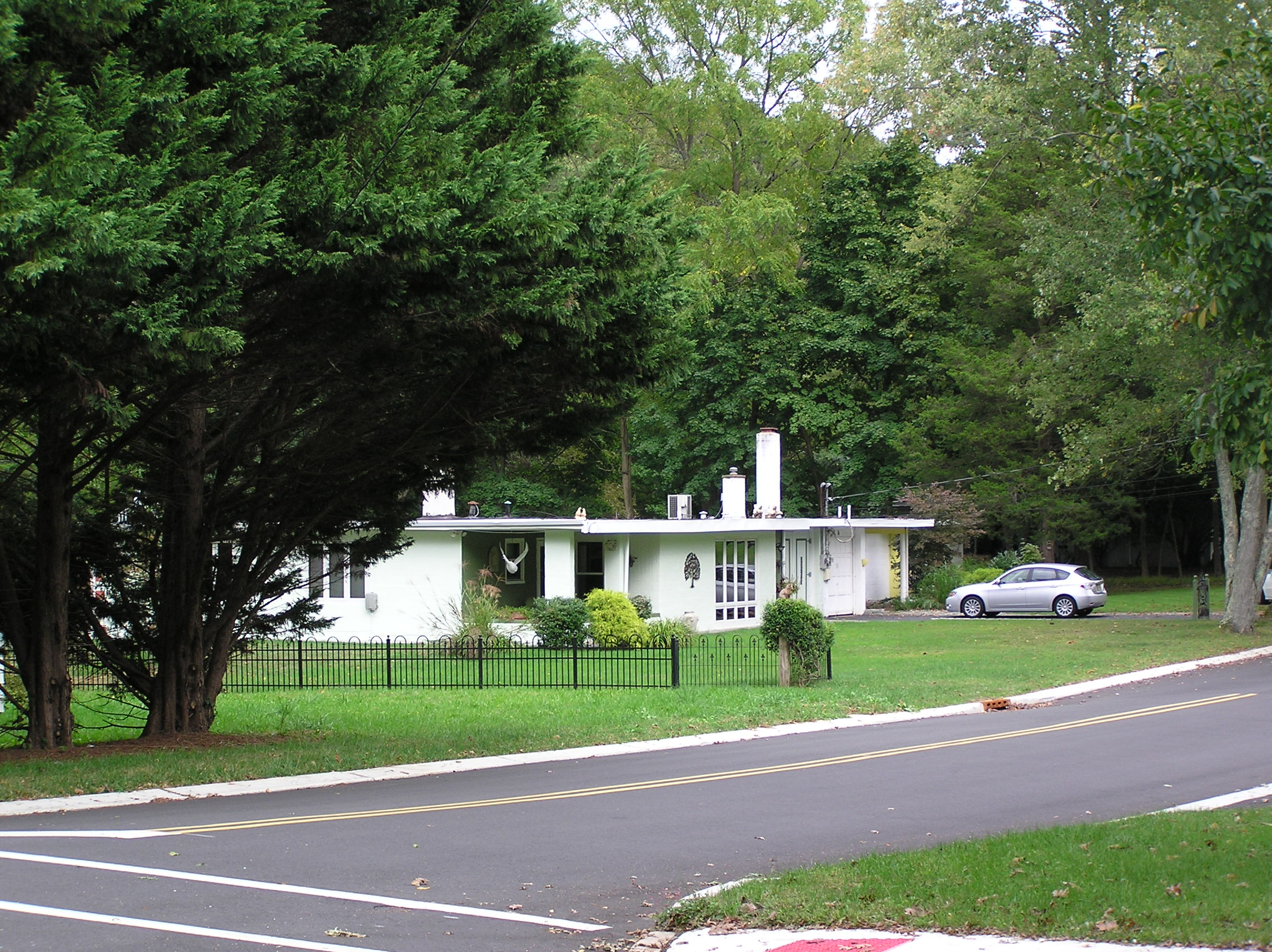

- Location within Monmouth County, New Jersey
- Coordinates: 40.220742°N 74.470155°W
- NRHP reference No.: 83004053
- NJRHP No.: 2052

Significant dates
- Added to NRHP: December 5, 1983
- Designated NJRHP: October 14, 1983

Roosevelt was originally called Jersey Homesteads, and was created during the Great Depression as part of President Roosevelt's New Deal, its main purpose being to resettle Jewish garment workers. The town was conceived as an integrated cooperative project, with farming, manufacturing, and retail all on a cooperative basis. The project fell under the discretion of the Resettlement Administration, but was conceived and largely planned out by Benjamin Brown.

Farmland in Central Jersey was purchased by Jersey Homesteads, Inc., a corporation owned by the federal government but under control of a board of directors selected by Brown. Construction started around 1936. Soon after there were 200 homes and various public facilities in place. The economy of the town consisted of a garment factory and a farm. Objectives of the community were to help residents escape poverty, to show that cooperative management can work, and as an experiment in government intervention.

Albert Einstein gave the town his political and moral support. Artist Ben Shahn lived in the town and painted a fresco mural viewable in the current Roosevelt Public School. The three panels show the history of the Jersey Homesteads, starting with the eastern European origins of its Jewish residents, their passage through Ellis Island and making plans for the community in Roosevelt.

David Dubinsky and the International Ladies' Garment Workers' Union opposed the project, arguing that the factory town would cause unions to lose their power over wages. Political opposition came from those who thought too much money was being spent on the project, as well as those opposed to the New Deal in general.

The Jersey Homesteads cooperative didn't last through World War II. It failed for a number of reasons. One of the main reasons for its failure is because of delays in housing construction and resulted of shortage in workers in the garment factory. They ended up going on strike against themselves and the Farm Security Administration declared it a failure in 1939 and tried to auction off the assets. By early 1940, having failed to auction the factory fixtures, negotiations with Kartiganer and Co. succeeded and the company began operations at the Jersey Homesteads factory. Proving to be no more economically successful than the factory, the settlement's agricultural cooperative ceased operations in 1940. Although the clothing store failed with the factory, the borough's cooperative grocery and meat market endured into the 1940s. According to town expert Michael Hiltzik another reason it failed is "It was very, very expensive, and the agricultural progress that New Dealers thought they'd make, and certainly the industrial gains they thought they would see, never really materialized"

Roosevelt is a historic landmark and is the subject of the 1983 documentary, Roosevelt, New Jersey: Visions of Utopia. The Jersey Homesteads Historic District was added to the New Jersey Register of Historic Places and to the National Register of Historic Places in 1983, including "all that area within the corporate boundaries of the Borough of Roosevelt".

== Geography ==
According to the United States Census Bureau, the borough had a total area of 1.95 square miles (5.05 km^{2}), including 1.94 square miles (5.02 km^{2}) of land and 0.01 square miles (0.02 km^{2}) of water (0.46%).

The borough borders the Monmouth County municipalities of Millstone Township on the north and east and Upper Freehold Township on the southwest.

== Demographics ==
Historical population
Census	Pop.	Note	%±
1940	698		—
1950	720		3.2%
1960	764		6.1%
1970	814		6.5%
1980	835		2.6%
1990	884		5.9%
2000	933		5.5%
2010	882		−5.5%
2020	808		−8.4%
2023 (est.)	799	▼	−1.1%
Population sources: 1940–1990; 2000 2010 2020

=== 2010 census ===
The 2010 United States census counted 882 people, 314 households, and 241 families in the borough. The population density was 461.8 per square mile (178.3/km^{2}). There were 327 housing units at an average density of 171.2 per square mile (66.1/km^{2}). The racial makeup was 92.52% (816) White, 0.91% (8) Black or African American, 0.00% (0) Native American, 3.17% (28) Asian, 0.00% (0) Pacific Islander, 1.93% (17) from other races, and 1.47% (13) from two or more races. Hispanic or Latino of any race were 5.90% (52) of the population.

Of the 314 households, 31.8% had children under the age of 18; 65.9% were married couples living together; 6.1% had a female householder with no husband present and 23.2% were non-families. Of all households, 17.5% were made up of individuals and 9.6% had someone living alone who was 65 years of age or older. The average household size was 2.81 and the average family size was 3.22.

23.7% of the population were under the age of 18, 7.8% from 18 to 24, 17.5% from 25 to 44, 37.3% from 45 to 64, and 13.7% who were 65 years of age or older. The median age was 45.8 years. For every 100 females, the population had 98.2 males. For every 100 females ages 18 and older there were 93.9 males.

The Census Bureau's 2006–2010 American Community Survey showed that (in 2010 inflation-adjusted dollars) median household income was $81,000 (with a margin of error of +/− $13,354) and the median family income was $86,406 (+/− $11,892). Males had a median income of $48,571 (+/− $11,433) versus $40,909 (+/− $17,307) for females. The per capita income for the borough was $33,863 (+/− $6,772). About 4.7% of families and 8.6% of the population were below the poverty line, including 13.4% of those under age 18 and 6.5% of those age 65 or over.

=== 2000 census ===
As of the 2000 United States census there were 933 people, 337 households, and 258 families residing in the borough. The population density was 477.0 inhabitants per square mile (184.2/km^{2}). There were 351 housing units at an average density of 179.4 per square mile (69.3/km^{2}). The racial makeup of the borough was 88.96% White, 2.57% African American, 2.04% Asian, 0.11% Pacific Islander, 2.25% from other races, and 4.07% from two or more races. Hispanic or Latino of any race were 4.50% of the population.

There were 337 households, out of which 39.5% had children under the age of 18 living with them, 64.1% were married couples living together, 7.7% had a female householder with no husband present, and 23.4% were non-families. 18.7% of all households were made up of individuals, and 11.3% had someone living alone who was 65 years of age or older. The average household size was 2.77 and the average family size was 3.17.

In the borough the population was spread out, with 27.8% under the age of 18, 5.9% from 18 to 24, 26.7% from 25 to 44, 27.5% from 45 to 64, and 12.1% who were 65 years of age or older. The median age was 40 years. For every 100 females, there were 92.8 males. For every 100 females age 18 and over, there were 87.7 males.

The median income for a household in the borough was $61,979, and the median income for a family was $67,019. Males had a median income of $50,417 versus $38,229 for females. The per capita income for the borough was $24,892. About 3.9% of families and 4.3% of the population were below the poverty line, including 4.0% of those under age 18 and 18.4% of those age 65 or over.

== Government ==
=== Local government ===
Roosevelt is governed under the borough form of New Jersey municipal government, which is used in 218 municipalities (of the 564) statewide, making it the most common form of government in New Jersey. The governing body is comprised of the mayor and the borough council, with all positions elected at-large on a partisan basis as part of the November general election. A mayor is elected directly by the voters to a four-year term of office. The borough council includes six members elected to serve three-year terms on a staggered basis, with two seats coming up for election each year in a three-year cycle. The borough form of government used by Roosevelt is a "weak mayor / strong council" government in which council members act as the legislative body with the mayor presiding at meetings and voting only in the event of a tie. The mayor can veto ordinances subject to an override by a two-thirds majority vote of the council. The mayor makes committee and liaison assignments for council members, and most appointments are made by the mayor with the advice and consent of the council.

As of 2025, the mayor of Roosevelt is Democrat Peggy Malkin, whose term of office ends December 31, 2027. The members of the Roosevelt Borough Council are Council President Joseph E. Trammell (D, 2026), Robert Atwood (D, 2024), Louis Esakoff (D, 2026), Danelle Feigenbaum (D, 2025; appointed to serve an unexpired term), Constance Herrstrom (D, 2025), Kristine Kaufman-Marut (D, 2027) and Ralph Warnick (D, 2027).

In June 2021, the borough council selected Constance Herrstrom from a list of three candidates nominated by the Democratic municipal committee to fill the seat expiring in December 2022 that had been held by Luke D. Dermody until he resigned from office. Herrstrom served on an interim basis until the November 2021 general election when she was elected to serve the balance of the term of office.

In August 2017, Mayor Jeff Ellentuck (whose term was to expire in December 2019), Council President Stacey Bonna (in 2017) and Councilwoman Jill Lipoti (2018) all resigned, citing conflicts between factions of the Democratic Party in the borough. Councilmember Michael L. Ticktin, who had been elected to serve an unexpired term of office expiring in 2018, presented his resignation as Councilmember on August 19, leaving the three remaining councilmembers without the quorum needed to conduct official business. As in all such cases where there is an insufficient number of elected officials, Governor Chris Christie will have 30 days to appoint replacements to fill the vacancies.

Citing infighting on the council, Mayor Jeff Ellentuck, and councimembers Stacey Bonna and Jill Lipoti resigned in August 2017 and when councilmember Michael Ticktin resigned less than a week later, the governing body was left without a quorum. As specified by state law in such circumstances, Governor of New Jersey Chris Christie selected registered Democrats Robin Middleman Filepp, Nicholas Murray and Maureen S. Parrott to fill the vacant seats, from applications submitted by borough residents. In the November 2017 general election, Peggy Malkin was elected to serve the two years remaining on the mayoral term and Robin Filepp and Deirdre Sheean were elected to one-year vacancies on the borough council.

In February 2015, the borough council selected Jill Lipoti to fill the vacant seat expiring in December 2017 of Michelle Hermelee, who had resigned earlier that month due to work demands.

In 2006, more than 80% of Roosevelt voters supported the recall of Neil Marko, the borough's mayor, by a vote of 282–68, in an effort initiated by the committee to Recall Marko. Voters chose Beth Battel, then the borough council's president, to replace Marko as mayor. The recall election was part of a larger controversy regarding a local yeshiva, a school for Jewish boys, that had been permitted to operate in a local synagogue by Mayor Marko, who was also the congregation's president. While supporters of the yeshiva, including Mayor Marko, described the opposition as "thinly veiled prejudice", a local historian described the recall as reflecting "not so much anti-Semitism as anti-Orthodox feelings".

=== Federal, state, and county representation ===
Roosevelt is located in the 3rd Congressional District and is part of New Jersey's 12th state legislative district.

For the 119th United States Congress, New Jersey's 3rd congressional district is currently represented Herb Conaway (D, Delran Township). New Jersey is represented in the United States Senate by Democrats Cory Booker (Newark, term ends 2027) and Andy Kim (Moorestown, term ends 2031).

For the 2026–2027 session, the 12th legislative district of the New Jersey Legislature is represented in the State Senate by Owen Henry (R, Old Bridge Township) and in the General Assembly by Robert D. Clifton (R, Matawan) and Alex Sauickie (R, Jackson Township).

Monmouth County is governed by a Board of County Commissioners composed of five members who are elected at-large to serve three-year terms of office on a staggered basis, with either one or two seats up for election each year as part of the November general election. At an annual reorganization meeting held in the beginning of January, the board selects one of its members to serve as director and another as deputy director.

As of 2025, Monmouth County's Commissioners are Director Thomas A. Arnone (R, Neptune City, 2025), Susan M. Kiley (R, Hazlet Township, 2027), Erik Anderson (R, Shrewsbury, 2026), Nick DiRocco (R, Wall Township, 2025), and Deputy Director Ross F. Licitra (R, Marlboro Township, 2026).

Constitutional officers elected on a countywide basis are Clerk Christine Giordano Hanlon (R, 2025; Ocean Township), Sheriff Shaun Golden (R, 2025; Howell Township) and Surrogate Rosemarie D. Peters (R, 2026; Middletown Township).

=== Politics ===
Presidential election results

United States presidential election results for Roosevelt
Year	Republican		Democratic		Third party(ies)	
Year	No.	%	No.	%	No.	%
2024	160	31.43%	335	65.82%	14	2.75%
2020	170	31.19%	365	66.97%	10	1.83%
2016	153	29.88%	327	63.87%	32	6.25%
2012	109	23.80%	339	74.02%	10	2.18%
2008	137	27.29%	354	70.52%	11	2.19%
2004	147	29.52%	342	68.67%	9	1.81%
2000	116	23.67%	330	67.35%	44	8.98%
1996	96	21.24%	313	69.25%	43	9.51%
1992	105	21.30%	307	62.27%	81	16.43%
1988	156	31.71%	336	68.29%	0	0.00%
1984	156	36.11%	276	63.89%	0	0.00%
1980	101	25.38%	248	62.31%	49	12.31%
1976	76	20.65%	292	79.35%	0	0.00%
1972	77	20.81%	293	79.19%	0	0.00%
1968	38	9.82%	309	79.84%	40	10.34%
1964	32	7.79%	379	92.21%	0	0.00%
1960	49	12.76%	335	87.24%	0	0.00%
1956	45	11.94%	332	88.06%	0	0.00%
1952	40	10.90%	327	89.10%	0	0.00%
1948	41	16.21%	192	75.89%	20	7.91%
1944	20	5.32%	356	94.68%	0	0.00%
1940	29	9.80%	267	90.20%	0	0.00%

As of March 23, 2011, there were a total of 608 registered voters in Roosevelt, of which 351 (57.7%) were registered as Democrats, 60 (9.9%) were registered as Republicans and 195 (32.1%) were registered as Unaffiliated. There were 2 voters registered as Libertarians or Greens.

Gubernatorial election results for Roosevelt
Year	Republican		Democratic		Third party(ies)	
Year	No.	%	No.	%	No.	%
2025	122	26.81%	330	72.53%	3	0.66%
2021	107	35.43%	189	62.58%	6	1.99%
2017	118	29.80%	261	65.91%	17	4.29%
2013	116	37.66%	184	59.74%	8	2.60%
2009	126	34.33%	215	58.58%	26	7.08%
2005	77	21.75%	250	70.62%	27	7.63%

Roosevelt is a historically Democratic jurisdiction in the state of New Jersey. Since the first presidential election after its incorporation as Jersey Homesteads, all 21 Democratic party nominees for president have carried the borough by a margin of 25 points or greater, even in the nationwide Republican landslides of 1956, 1972, and 1984 that saw New Jersey vote Republican by over 20 points, and Monmouth County vote Republican by over 30 points. The highest percentage of the vote won by a Democratic presidential candidate is the 94.68% of the vote won by Franklin Delano Roosevelt in 1944. Roosevelt in 1940, as well as Lyndon Johnson in 1964, also won over 90% of the vote for the Democrats. The highest percentage of the vote won by a Republican presidential candidate is the 36.11% of the vote won by Ronald Reagan in 1984.

Similarly, all 23 Democratic party nominees for governor of New Jersey since 1937 have carried Roosevelt with three campaigns, Robert B. Meyner in 1953 and 1957, and Brendan Byrne in 1973, each breaking 90% of the vote for the party. Meyner's 1957 campaign, which garnered 93.52% was the largest total won by any gubernatorial candidate in Roosevelt since the borough's incorporation. The best showing by a Republican gubernatorial nominee was the 46.13% received by Thomas Kean in 1985. In that election, Roosevelt was one of only three municipalities (along with Audubon Park, and Chesilhurst) in the entire state of New Jersey that supported Peter Shapiro.

United States Senate election results for Roosevelt1
Year	Republican		Democratic		Third party(ies)	
Year	No.	%	No.	%	No.	%
2024	145	29.41%	331	67.14%	17	3.45%
2018	129	29.86%	284	65.74%	19	4.40%
2012	92	21.45%	322	75.06%	15	3.50%
2006	68	19.15%	268	75.49%	19	5.35%

United States Senate election results for Roosevelt2
Year	Republican		Democratic		Third party(ies)	
Year	No.	%	No.	%	No.	%
2020	158	29.48%	360	67.16%	18	3.36%
2014	61	20.33%	234	78.00%	5	1.67%
2013	47	19.26%	191	78.28%	6	2.46%
2008	119	26.56%	314	70.09%	15	3.35%

== Education ==
The Roosevelt Public School District serves public school students in pre-kindergarten through fifth grade at Roosevelt Public School. As of the 2021–22 school year, the district, comprised of one school, had an enrollment of 84 students and 8.0 classroom teachers (on an FTE basis), for a student–teacher ratio of 10.5:1. In the 2016–17 school year, Roosevelt had the 6th-smallest enrollment of any school district in the state, with 88 students.

For sixth through twelfth grades, public school students attend the East Windsor Regional School District, which serves students from East Windsor and Hightstown, with students from Roosevelt attending as part of a sending/receiving relationship. Schools in the East Windsor district attended by Roosevelt students (with 2021–22 enrollment data from the National Center for Education Statistics) are Melvin H. Kreps Middle School with 1,194 students in grades 6–8 and Hightstown High School with 1,621 students in grades 9–12.

From 2005 to 2010, a Jewish secondary and post-secondary religious school, Yeshiva Me'on Hatorah, was located in a local synagogue, Congregation Anshei Roosevelt. Due to unresolvable zoning issues for its dormitory and dining facilities, and local opposition to its presence, the yeshiva relocated to Monsey, New York, after the yeshiva brought and lost several actions against the borough and certain individual borough officials in state and Federal courts.

== Transportation ==
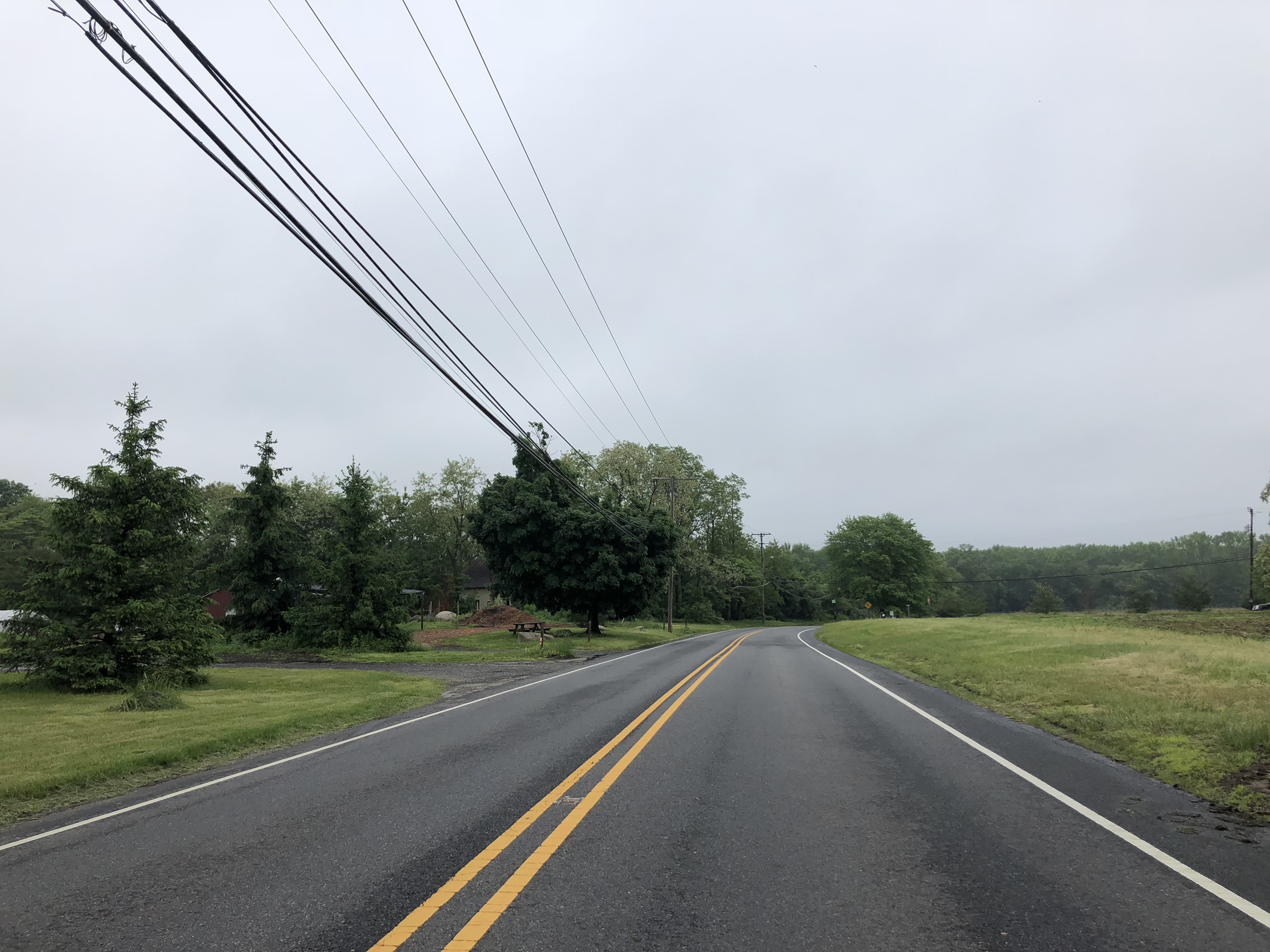
CR 571 entering Roosevelt from the northwest

As of May 2010, the borough had a total of 8.43 miles (13.57 km) of roadways, of which 6.27 miles (10.09 km) were maintained by the municipality and 2.16 miles (3.48 km) by Monmouth County.

The only major road that passes through is County Route 571, which traverses the center of the borough.

Interstate 195 is accessible in both of its neighboring towns. Interstate 95 (the New Jersey Turnpike) and Route 33 are also nearby.

== Notable people ==
People who were born in, residents of, or otherwise closely associated with Roosevelt include:

- Benjamin Appel (1907–1977), crime novelist
- Benjamin Brown (1885–1939), poultry trader who developed Roosevelt
- John Stanley Grauel (1917–1986), Methodist minister and Zionist leader
- Lois Hunt (1925–2009), soprano opera singer who toured for decades with baritone Earl Wrightson
- Louis Kahn (1901–1974), assistant architect for the Jersey Homesteads, who later designed internationally famous buildings
- Irwin Lachman (born 1930), one of the inventors of the catalytic converter
- Jacob Landau (1917–2001), printmaker, painter, and humanist
- David Stone Martin (1913–1992), artist best known for his designs for jazz album covers
- Stefan Martin (1936–1994), printmaker
- Gregorio Prestopino (1907–1984), social realist painter of the 1930s
- Paul Prestopino (1939–2023), multi-instrumental musician and audio engineer
- Louise Rosskam (1910–2003), documentary photographer
- Ben Shahn (1898–1969), Social realist painter
- Bernarda Bryson Shahn (1903–2004), painter and wife of Ben Shahn
- Jonathan Shahn (1938–2021), noted sculptor and son of Ben and Bernarda Shahn
