= Merle Marsicano =

American dancer and choreographer

Merle Marsicano (née Petersen, 1903–1983) was an American dancer and choreographer who worked with a wide range of avant-garde composers and artists.

== Life ==
Marsicano was born in Philadelphia, Pennsylvania. She studied ballet with Ethel Phillips and Michael Mordkin, tap dance with Edna Wroe, and modern dance with Martha Graham and Ruth St. Denis. She was married to painter Nicholas Marsicano.

== Career ==
In 1962, Marsicano formed the Merle Marsicano Dance Company and was frequently associated with the Tenth Street group of abstract expressionists. Franz Kline painted a backdrop for her work Queen of Hearts (1960), the largest painting in Kline's oeuvre .

She collaborated with John Cage, Morton Feldman, Stefan Wolpe and many other composers. Feldman composed several pieces including Figure of Memory and Dance Suite for Marsicano. Figure of Memory was first performed at the Henry Street Playhouse in New York on April 3,1954, by Marsicano.

In 1970, New York Times critic Don McDonagh wrote that Marsicano's choreography had a "languorous sensuousness," with the "weight and feel of a satisfying stretch." In a 1977 review, he wrote that, "Almost always, one has the impression that the works are somehow independent of the rhythmic and spatial laws that ordinarily govern dancing."

In The International Encyclopedia of Dance, P. W. Manchester described her dancing style:

Marsicano made no use of floor movements; she neither jumped nor turned. Instead, she made time stand still as she wove patterns with her feet, a subtly flexible torso, and eloquent arms. She seemed to will the air to become heavy or weightless as she passed through it.

Richard Kostelanetz wrote, "Merle Marsicano has long had a reputation among the cognoscenti as one of the most imaginative choreographers."

Marsicano taught at Smith College and Yale University, where she also presented a recital in collaboration with John Cage. Her papers are housed in the collection of the New York Public Library.
