= Clarion, Utah =

Clarion
- Ghost town
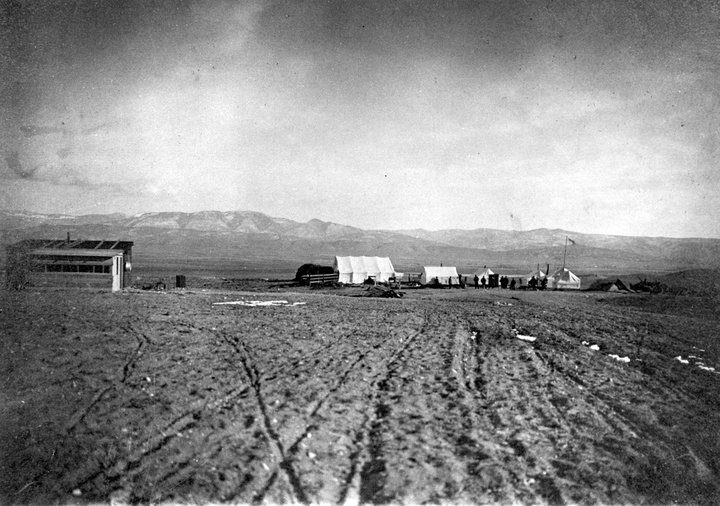

- Location within Utah Location within the United States
- Coordinates: 39°07′20″N 111°53′11″W
- Country: United States
- State: Utah
- County: Sanpete
- Established: 1911
- Abandoned: 1915

Clarion is a ghost town in Sanpete County, Utah, United States, 5 miles (8.0 km) southwest of Gunnison. Clarion was the site of an early-twentieth century experiment in Jewish rural living. The Clarion site totaled 6,085 acres (24.63 km^{2}; 9.508 sq mi), and was five miles from north to south along the Sevier River and 3 miles (4.8 km) wide. The area today is in the Centerfield, Utah postal district.

== Origins ==
The Jewish question was a wide-ranging debate in 19th- and 20th-century European society pertaining to the appropriate status and treatment of Jews in society. The debate was similar to other so-called "national questions" and dealt with the civil, legal, national and political status of Jews as a minority within society. Historically in Europe, Jews faced prohibitions on acquiring real estate and were often denied membership in various professional guilds. As a result, many of them ended up residing in impoverished urban ghettos and rural villages. European Jewish reformers and Zionist nationalists argued that Jews needed to become "a normal nation" and advocated for Jewish land ownership and agriculture cultivation in a back-to-the-land movement. Jews would find a purer life engaged in manual labor and a great attraction to North America, South America, and Palestine with the legal possibility of land ownership.

In January 1910 in Philadelphia, Benjamin Brown established the Jewish Agricultural and Colonial Association and listed its primary office in Philadelphia's West Parkside neighborhood, with 250 members, branches in New York and Baltimore, and for the purpose of, "Settling on farms and mutual aid". Brown served as president and Isaac Herbst was secretary.

Brown and Herbst, as representatives of the organization, traveled in 1911 to investigate potential sites in New Mexico, Colorado, Wyoming, and Montana. The New Mexico option proved to be impractically expensive. As the disappointed Brown and Herbst were preparing to leave New Mexico, they received a telegram inviting them to stop in Utah. The state was engaged in a campaign to attract settlers, and planning the construction of the Piute Canal in Sanpete County, Utah. The canal would irrigate vast tracts of desert and Brown and Herbst were encouraged by the opportunity.

The association was also attracted by the financially secure and politically established Salt Lake City Jewish community. Socially prominent Salt Lake City Jews Simon Bamberger, Samuel Newhouse, and attorney Daniel Alexander pledged support to the initiative with advocacy among area business and political leaders. A Utah State Board of Land Commissioners representative escorted Brown and Herbst to inspect available land. Brown and Herbst were impressed with a parcel of state-owned land in south-central Utah below the planned Piute Canal. Brown was convinced of the soil's fertility, and with the state's assurances of available water, the association agreed to purchase the land at auction on August 7, 1911.

== The Colony in Clarion (1911-1916) ==
After purchasing the territory in Clarion, Benjamin Brown and twelve original colonists "chosen for their mechanical skills, experience with horses, and ‘seriousness,’” arrived at the settlement on September 10, 1911. The Clarion location offered seemingly cultivatable land that was sufficiently large enough to handle the group of incoming colonists, and was strategically located near a railroad depot, easily connecting the territory to Salt Lake City. The original occupants of the land, however, were initially surprised to encounter land that, despite promoted as fertile, had a short growing season. But, the colonists nonetheless dug irrigation channels from the nearby canal and began to plant their crops such as wheat, oats, and alfalfa. Although the settlement was small, with just 23 families, optimism was high. Utah had been advertising nationally to receive more settlers, and Governor William Spry was so pleased with the experiment that he journeyed the 135 miles (217 km) from the capital in order to celebrate the community's first harvest.

By May 1912, the colonists quickly began to see their investment pay off, as they were able to harvest their crops while new families frequently arrived at the site. However, the colonists were simultaneously plagued by dust storms, heat, strong winds, flies and mosquitoes, which, when combined with a scarcity of water, doomed their harvest: six-hundred acres produced only half of their expected yield.

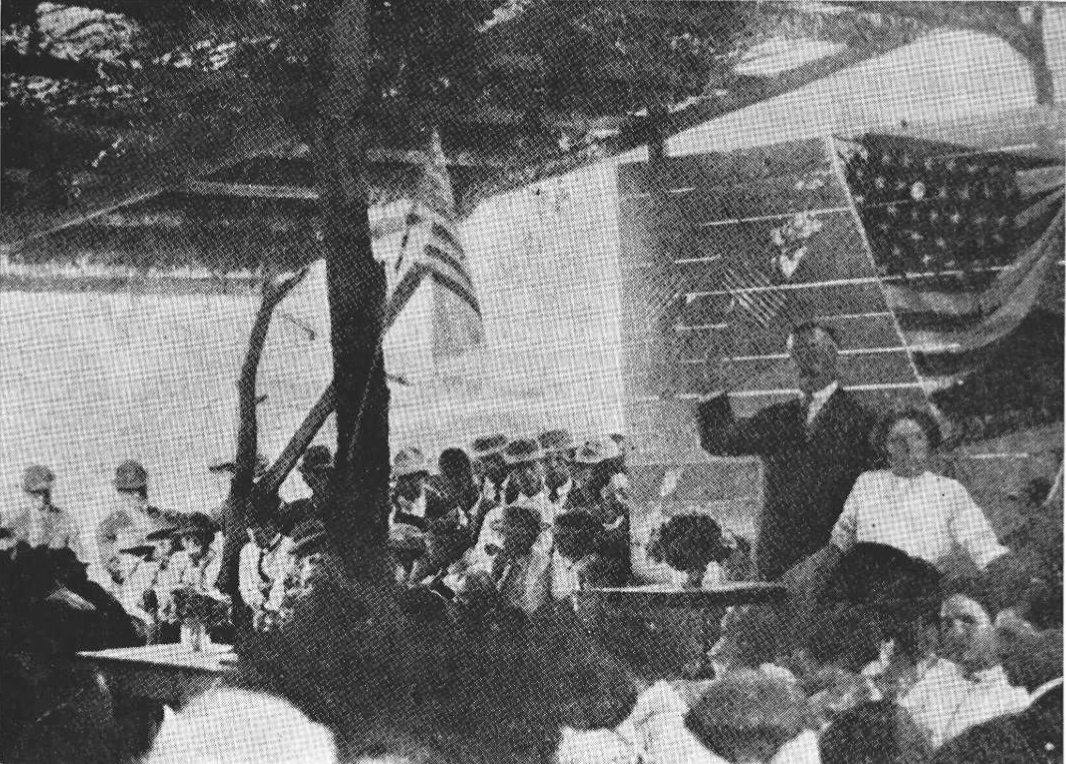
Utah Governor William Spry speaks at Clarion, Utah Harvest Festival on August 18, 1912

The colony celebrated a harvest festival on August 18, 1912. More than 1,000 people attended including Governor William Spry, then State Senator Simon Bamberger, representatives of Salt Lake City's established German Jewish community, local residents of Sanpete and Sevier counties, and Rabbi Isaac Landman who was traveling that summer through the American west, and spoke at the festival.

In the fallout of the year's poor performing harvest, the colony decided that having individual control over the territory would be more beneficial. Shortly thereafter, forty-acre lots of land began to replace collective work and ownership of the property. By October 1912, there were about 150 families at the colony when the Jewish Agricultural and Colonial Association announced that one hundred and fifty additional families would join the settlement.

While the individual plots of land were not uniform in terms of soil quality, they did lead to more success in terms of crops in the Spring of 1913. Combined with the construction of a well to make water more accessible, the population of Clarion continued to grow, and the colony as a whole started to show signs of stability. However, through the Summer and Fall, severe weather frequently challenged living and planting conditions, as well as the stamina of the colonists, which, combined with a water shortage, devastated the 1914 harvest.

By 1915, the population of Clarion had decreased by almost two-thirds, and a second consecutive poor harvest during the year led to even more residents leaving in the pursuit of industrial labor opportunities in major cities such as New York and Chicago. Ultimately, a state order terminated the colony’s title on November 25, 1915. Shortly thereafter, in January 1916, the state of Utah began to auction off the colony’s land. Although some colonists remained, as only about one-tenth of the total tract was sold, most of the Jewish residents left within three or four years of the sale of the territory.

== After the colony ==
After the demise of the Jewish colony, others moved into the area. Japanese families settled in the Clarion area in 1921, as did Mormons of Scandinavian descent. Brown and a few of the other Jewish colonists stayed and farmed in the area until the 1920s. The Kalispell, Montana Daily Inter Lake noted the passing in 1983 of Jean Stroud, born to Oscar and Matilda Jensen Keele in Clarion in 1923. There were enough persons residing in Clarion in 1925 to establish the Clarion LDS Ward. Friedland observed the Japanese families when he returned to the Clarion site in 1926.

In 1932, the Clarion LDS Ward had 166 members and met in the social hall constructed by the Jewish settlers. The LDS Ward was dissolved on April 1, 1934, "on account of the shortage of water." World War II disrupted the Japanese settlement and the land reverted to the local citizens. By 1959 the Clarion social hall had been turned into a granary. The fence surrounding the two Jewish graves had been torn down and cows knocked down the headstones.

In 2008, the Salt Lake Tribune observed that fences had been reconstructed around the Jewish graves and noted the foundations of buildings and the walls of the broken cistern that burst the first day colonists used it. At the time of the centenary in 2011, Brown Rex Dairy abutted the Clarion site and local residents continued to refer to the area as "Clarion" although it is in the Centerfield postal district.

== Historiography ==
Leon Watters wrote of Clarion in 1952 in The Pioneer Jews of Utah: Studies in American Jewish History. University of Utah Logan professor Everett Cooly read about Clarion in Watters' book and advertised in American Jewish newspapers seeking correspondence with those who had participated.

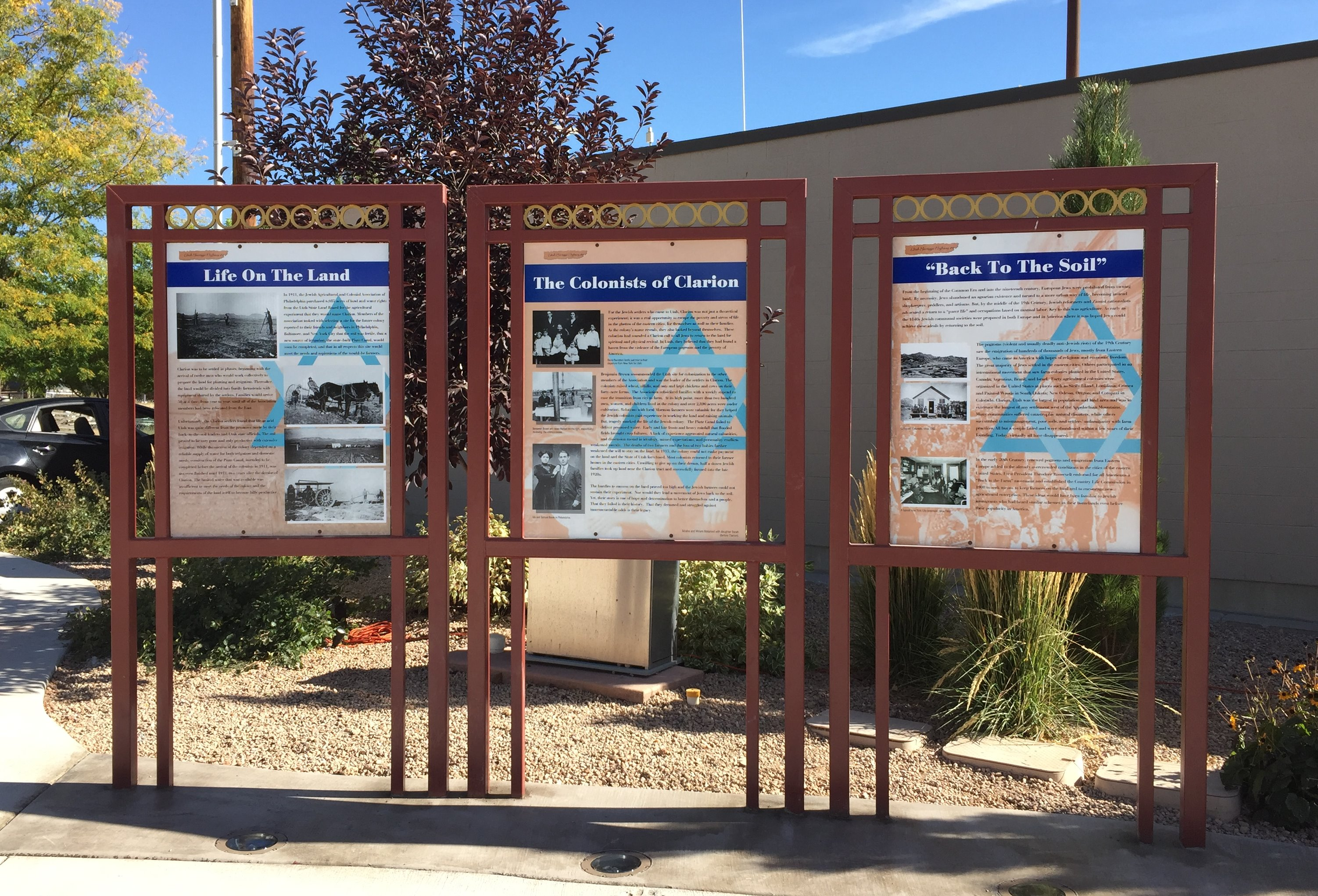
Clarion Kiosk - Gunnison, Utah (July 10, 2016)

University of Utah Professor Robert Goldberg chanced upon the Clarion remnants in 1980. A subsequent interview in Los Angeles with a descendant of one of the Clarion families led to Goldberg's writing the Jewish colony's history, Back to the Soil. Goldberg placed advertisements for contacts in the Salt Lake Jewish community newsletter. He tracked down 53 families with ties to Clarion, and reconstructed the story from interviews and records. Goldberg's papers are archived and accessible through the University of Utah in the Robert Alan Goldberg papers which include diaries, monographs, and news articles by or regarding the Clarion participants, as well as interviews, research questionnaires, and correspondence with their descendants.

Clarion was featured in the play "Life, More Sweet Than Bitter" which tells the story of a Jewish family from Dubossar, Russia which came through Philadelphia to Clarion. Beth Hatefutsoth in Tel Aviv included Clarion in the 1983 exhibit, "Diaspora Farmers of the 19th and 20th Century". You can also read the book the play was based on, Life More Sweet than Bitter, Maurice Warshaw with Rhoda Kelsch as author, recently republished in a Second Edition and edited by Ronald Kelsch of Vision Impact Publishing. The community was also featured in a segment in the 2007 play Impossible Cities: A Utopian Experiment. The settlement was the subject of a presentation in June 2013 at Congregation Yeshuron-Ezras Israel in the South Philadelphia neighborhood from which many of the Clarion colonists originated as part of the "Hidden City Philadelphia Festival 2013".

In September 2011 a celebration to mark the 100th anniversary of the settlement was celebrated in Salt Lake City. Tours of the site were featured.

The Mormon Pioneer National Heritage Area moved forward in 2014 with placing plaques on key sites in Clarion and developing an interpretive display on Gunnison's Main in coordination with the Gunnison City Council. The Mormon Pioneer National Heritage Area provided a grant for which it sought a fifty-percent match which was provided by the Jewish American Society for Historic Preservation. The Mormon Pioneer National Heritage Area dedicated three interpretive panels about Clarion in Gunnison on September 25, 2015.
