= Impossible Cities: A Utopian Experiment =

Impossible Cities: A Utopian Experiment is a play inspired by Italo Calvino's Invisible Cities and which deals with the fates of four different utopian communities in the United States. The play was staged by Walkabout Theater and premiered at Peter Jones Gallery. It grew out of a solo show by Seth Bockley, who also performs in the longer show.

One character, played by Jessica Hudson, works as a sort of master of ceremonies and narrates a number of chapters from Calvino's books. The four other performers in the play each discuss a single utopian experiment. Many of their speeches are autobiographical, and all deal explicitly with the relationship between the visions of the founders and the details of urban planning. Chloe Johnston discusses how the fortuitous discovery of a cookbook led to her interest in the Amana Colonies. Seth Zurer talks about life in Clarion, Utah, the site of an early twentieth-century Jewish experiment in rural living, an experiment in which his grandparents participated. Ira Murfin, in the most autobiographical segment, discusses Paolo Soleri's Arcosanti project in the Arizona desert. Seth Bockley takes up the life of, first, Joseph Smith and the history of Mormonism, especially in the community of Nauvoo, Illinois and, second, Etienne Cabet, a French socialist who brought hundreds of settlers to Nauvoo after the Mormons had been forced to leave.

Impossible Cities was recommended on the "Three to See" segment of Eight Forty-Eight, Chicago's public radio station WBEZ It also was chosen to be part of "The Reader Recommends" in The Chicago Reader.

== Bibliography ==
- Adler, Tony. "Utopian States of America", Chicago Tribune, January 5, 2007.
- Lifson, Edward. "Three to See", Eight Forty-Eight, National Public Radio, January 4, 2007
- Weiss, Hedy. "Stage news & notes", Chicago Sun-Times, January 5, 2007
