= Gregorio Prestopino =

American painter

- Born: June 21, 1907; New York City
- Died: December 19, 1984 (aged 77); Princeton, New Jersey
- Known for: Social Realism and New York Figurative Expressionism

Gregorio Prestopino (June 21, 1907 – December 19, 1984) was an American visual artist. According to the art historian Irma B. Jaffe, he was "one of the major American painters who refused to reject the image, [and] has devoted his career to depicting the human condition with a warmth tempered only by honesty".

== Biography ==
Prestopino was born in New York City's Little Italy. He was the second of three children born to Antonino Prestopino (1877–1937) and Letteria Rando (1866–1962), immigrants from Messina, Sicily, Italy. At the age of 14 he was awarded a scholarship to the National Academy of Design, with Charles Hawthorne. Early in his career he came under the influence of the French Impressionists, but was soon drawn to the American realists of the Ashcan School painters, whose work led him directly to the study of urban life. He won the 1972 Rome Prize.

== Variation of style and the influence of the MacDowell Colony ==
As a young man Prestopino set up his first studio in Harlem. During the 1930s his social realist paintings had an anecdotal quality in their description of everyday incidents of the working class, depicting the grit of city life – docks, laborers, vendors, Lower East Side streets. He moved to Roosevelt, New Jersey in 1949.

By the mid-1940s and the 1950s he concentrated on large, solid images that were able to function as universals with heightened drama while preserving their qualities as specific expressionistic images. His more realistic studies are largely black and white and detail poor urban suffering. Exemplifying this style is the series of paintings done in 1957 for "Life" magazine in connection with an article on Green Haven, a New York state prison. During this time Prestopino received high recognition along with Ben Shahn and Philip Evergood, well-known social realist painters. In the late 1950s Prestopino used Harlem as his subject. He created paintings that inspired the well-known American movie makers, John Hubley and Faith Elliot. During the filming they never took the camera off the paintings. The film, "Harlem Wednesday", with a jazz score by Benny Carter, won first prize at the First International Festival of Art Film in Venice.

In 1954, he became a director of the MacDowell Colony, beginning a lifelong association that profoundly influenced his art. In the MacDowell Colony he made friends with the painters Milton Avery, Sally Avery, Giorgio Cavllon, Linda Lindeberg and many others who were among the Fellows of MacDowell Colony. In 1958 Prestopino's landscape paintings were showing abstract tendencies. There is a noticeable cubist influence in his work as well. Much of his more cubist work uses brightly contrasting colors and involves human forms. Wet, sensuous color areas appeared on his canvases. Mythological figures, woods, brooks, fields, islands, mountains were joined-on powerful canvases that showed Prestopino's new vitality. According to the celebrated photographer Russel Lynes "the sound of the city…gave way to the sounds of the country, the relentless of bricks and pavement and steel to the happy disorder of dappled things."

== Retrospective exhibitions ==
- 1963: Michigan State University;
- 1975: New Jersey State Museum, Trenton, New Jersey;
- 1976: Thorne-Sagendorph Art Gallery, Keene State College, Keene, New Hampshire;
- 1979: Museum of Art Fort Lauderdale, Florida;
- 1985: In Memoriam Exhibition, Ellerslie Museum, Trenton, New Jersey; Sharon Arts Center, New Hampshire; Midtown Payson Galleries, New York City

A series of Gregorio Prestopino paintings entitled "Harlem Wednesday" toured the US in the 1960s. A watercolor painting from that series entitled, "The Family" is held by the Art and Artifacts Division of the Schomburg Center for Research in Black Culture.

== Collections ==
- Whitney Museum of American Art, New York
- Museum of Modern Art, New York
- Memorial Art Gallery, University of Rochester, New York
- Walker Art Center, Minneapolis, Minnesota
- Art Institute of Chicago, Illinois
- Smithsonian American Art Museum, Washington, D.C.
- Hirshhorn Museum and Sculpture Garden, Washington, D.C.
- Phillips Memorial Gallery, Washington, D.C.
- Brandeis University, Waltham, Massachusetts
- University of Nebraska–Lincoln
- University of Oklahoma
- University of Alabama
- Thorne Sagendorph Art Gallery, Keene, New Hampshire
- Hawaii University
- University of Texas
- University of Notre Dame, Indiana
- Butler Institute of American Art, Youngstown, Ohio
- Fairleigh Dickinson University, New Jersey
- Wagner College, Staten Island, New York
- New Jersey State Museum, Trenton, New Jersey
- Montclair Art Museum, Montclair, New Jersey
- The New School Art Center
- Currier Museum of Art, Manchester, New Hampshire
- American Academy of Arts and Letters, New York
- Addison Gallery of American Art, Andover, Massachusetts
- Guilford College Art Gallery, Greensboro, North Carolina

== See also ==
- Expressionism
- American Figurative Expressionism
- New York Figurative Expressionism
