= New Jersey State House =

State capitol building of the U.S. state of New Jersey

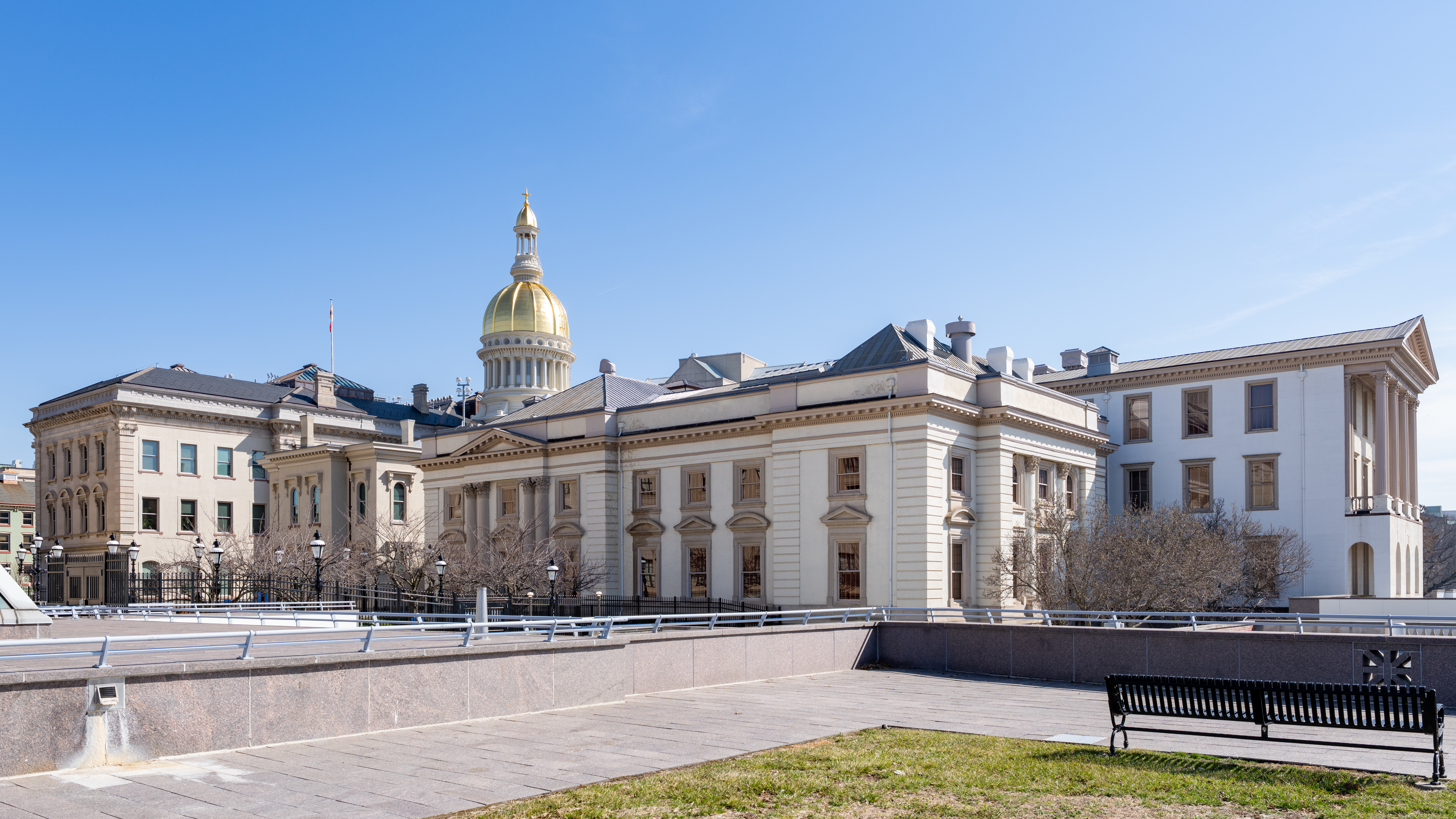
- Interactive map of the New Jersey State House area

General information
- Architectural style: American Renaissance
- Location: 125 West State Street; Trenton, New Jersey; United States
- Coordinates: 40°13′14″N 74°46′12″W
- Construction started: 1792; 234 years ago
- Completed: 1911; 115 years ago
- Client: State of New Jersey
- Owner: State of New Jersey

Design and construction
- Architects: Jonathon Doane (1792), John Notman (1845), Samuel Sloan (1871), Lewis Broome (1889), James Moylan (1891)

U.S. Historic district – Contributing property
- Designated: August 27, 1976
- Part of: State House Historic District
- Reference no.: 76001161

The New Jersey State House is the capitol building of the U.S. state of New Jersey and is the third-oldest state house in continuous legislative use in the United States. (Note: The Maryland State Capitol and the Virginia State Capitol are older.) Located in the state capital of Trenton, in Mercer County, it was originally built in 1792. The building accommodates both the New Jersey Legislature's Senate and General Assembly chambers, offices of the governor, lieutenant governor, and various state government departments. From August to November 1799, the federal government relocated its offices to Trenton, with the United States Department of State headquartered in the State House, following an outbreak of yellow fever in the then-capital of Philadelphia.

The State House has experienced numerous expansions and renovations to meet the growing needs of the state since its original construction. Designed by Jonathan Doane, the original structure has seen architectural inputs from other notable architects across the centuries. The State House underwent a significant restoration and modernization project in 1987, and another renovation project that started in 2017, with a major focus on the governor's office and related Executive Branch agencies.

The New Jersey State House deviates from the architectural trend of most U.S. capitol buildings, which are reminiscent of the U.S. Capitol, and is integrated into an urban setting instead of a park-like campus. It offers daily tours to the public and provides an educational platform for middle and high school students.

== History ==
After the legislature relocated to Trenton from Perth Amboy in 1790, it purchased 3.75 acres (0.0152 km^{2}) land for £250. Construction on the new state house, designed by Philadelphia-based architect Jonathan Doane, began in 1792. The Doane building was covered in stucco, measured 150 by 50 feet (46 m × 15 m) and housed the Senate and House chambers in opposite wings. To meet the demands of the growing state, the structure was expanded several times during the 19th century.

In 1845, Philadelphia architect John Notman created a three-stepped office wing on the north side of the original building facing West State Street. The new entrance was built with a two-story porch with fluted Doric columns. A large rotunda and stair hall connected the old and new wings under a spherical dome and cupola. Additionally, a two-story portico with Corinthian columns and classical pediment was added to the river-side facade. In 1865, the river-side portico was extended. In 1871, architect Samuel Sloan was commissioned to design new wings to house both legislative chambers flanking the extended portico.

On March 21, 1885, a large fire destroyed the West State Street wing. In 1889, architect Lewis Broome of Jersey City led the reconstruction of the building in a simplified Second Empire style. He added the current rotunda and 145 ft (44 m) dome made of cast iron covered with copper and gold leaf, as well as limestone facing. On the rotunda, the Latin phrase "Fiat justitia ruat caelum" is written which translates to ""Let justice be done though the heavens fall." Broome went on to design the City Hall for Jersey City.

In 1891, James Moylan, an architect and sitting assemblyman, led the replacement of the Assembly wing. He redesigned it in a late Victorian style, rotating the wing to be parallel to the building's center wing. There was also an addition to the west wing to add private offices for the governor and judges, as well as a third floor added to the south end of the center wing. In 1900, the wing was extended again. In 1903, Merchantville architect Arnold Moses reconstructed the Senate wing in the American Renaissance style. The New Jersey State House's original east wing was replaced with a four-story office section in 1906 and attained its current size in 1912 with extensions to the east and west wing. The only major change in the decades since has been modernization of the main corridor in 1950.

=== State House Annex ===
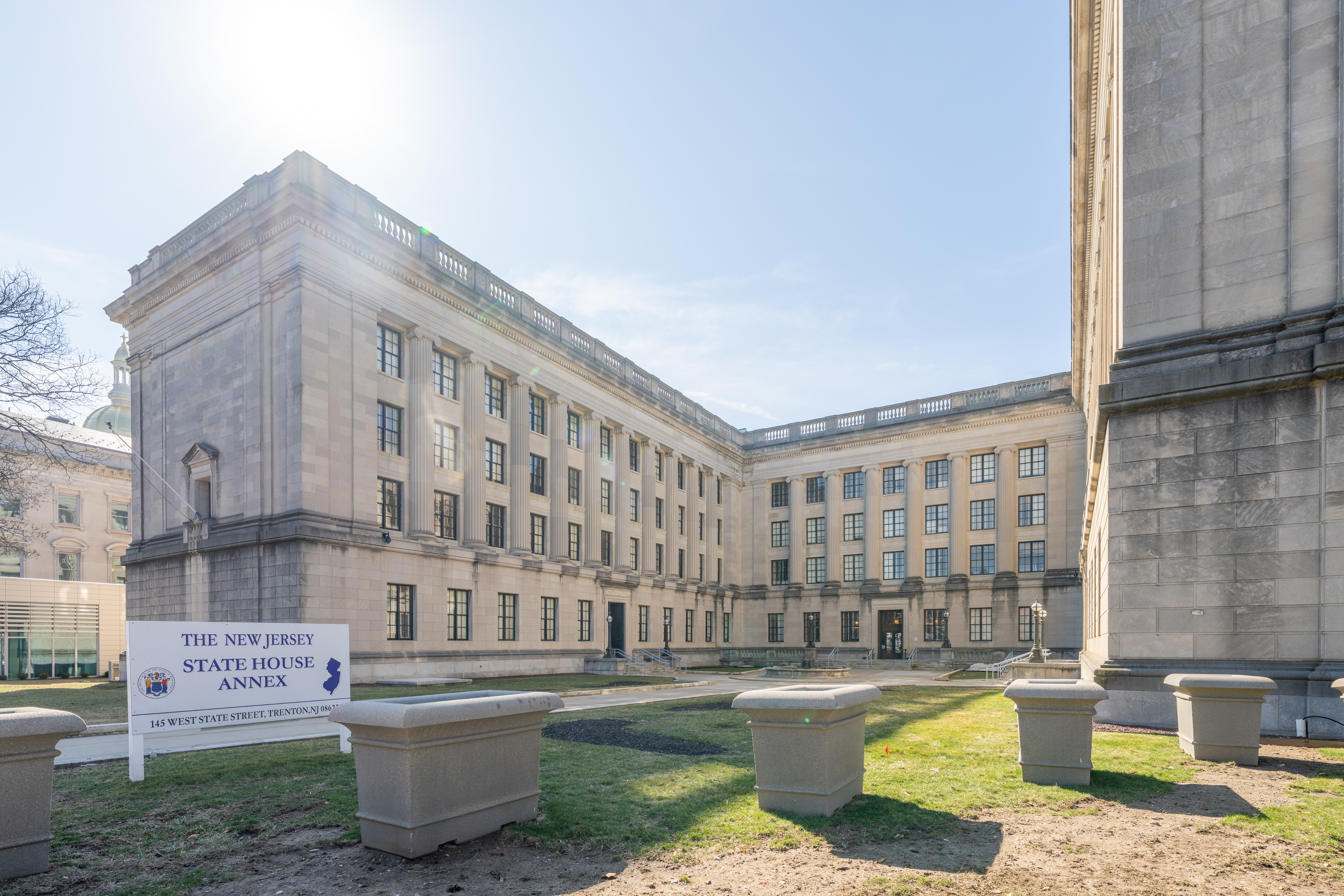
State House Annex (2026)

Next to the State House and connected via an interior pedestrian tunnel, the State House Annex was built between 1927 and 1931. It originally housed the New Jersey State Library, the New Jersey State Museum, and the New Jersey Supreme Court. Today, the Annex is used for legislative offices and committee meetings.

=== Building renovations ===
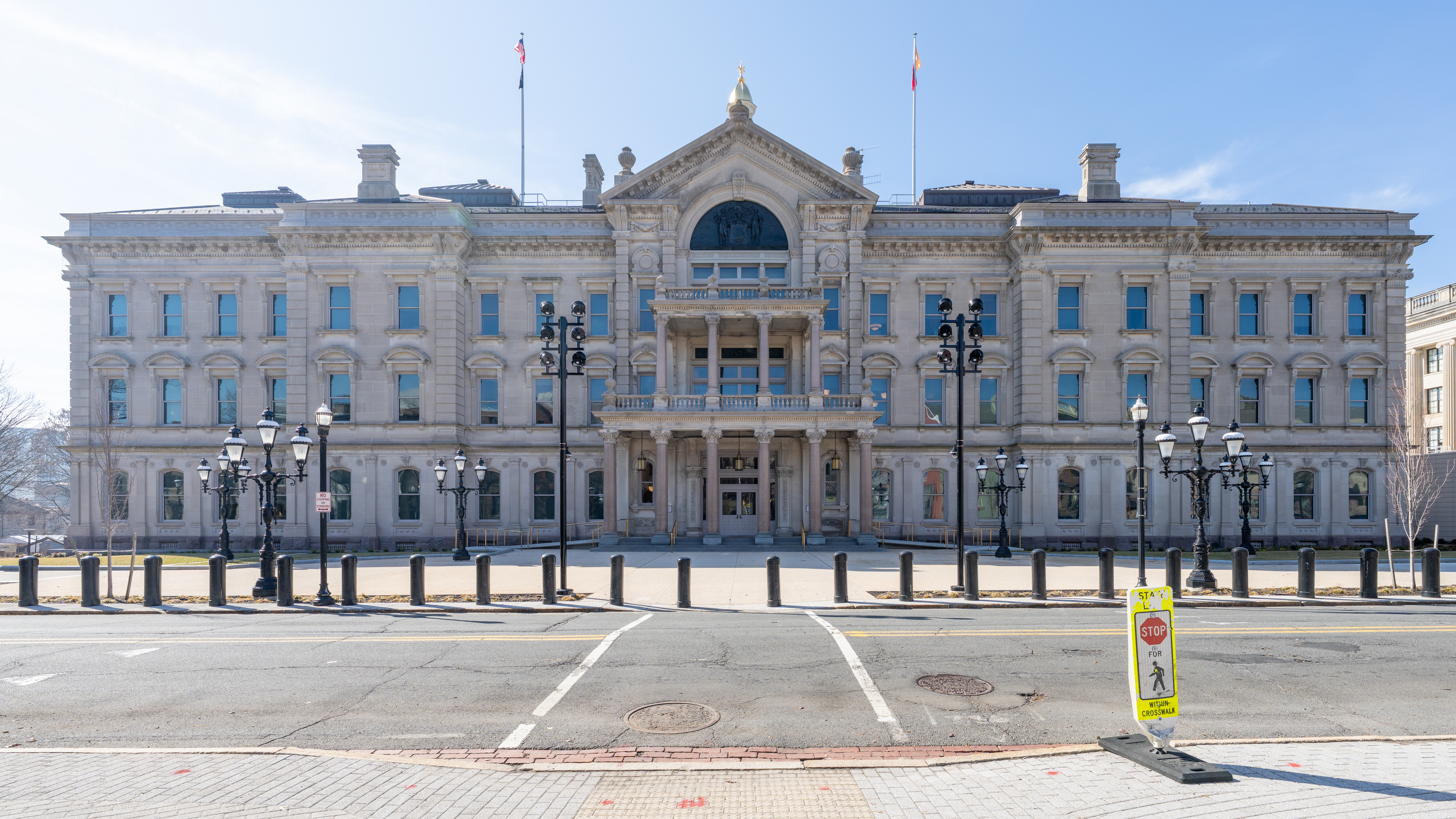
Post-Renovation Portico (2026)

A lengthy renovation and restoration project began in 1987. The project encompassed the legislative section of the building, an upgrade of mechanical and electrical systems, and the construction of the South Addition (office space). A parking garage, pedestrian tunnel, and other amenities were also constructed.

From 1996 to 1999, the exterior of the State House dome was restored through the "Dimes for the Dome" program with money raised by New Jersey school kids. The dome is gilded with 48,000 pieces of gold leaf with each piece costing $1.00 at the time. As a thank you for their contribution, the dome was rededicated in honor of the children of New Jersey.

In 2017, a $300M restoration of the entire building mainly focused on the governor's office and related Executive Branch agencies began and was scheduled to finish in 2023. The building was restored to how it looked in the early 1900s. Drop ceilings were removed, revealing long-hidden skylights. Modern sprinklers, fire alarms, heating, and air conditioning were installed, windows were replaced, and internal fire escape stairwells were added.

The governor's office and other areas that were closed for renovation were officially re-opened at a dedication ceremony on May 1, 2023.

In May 2025, the State House's Welcome Center was renamed in honor of longtime Senator and former Governor Richard Codey.

== Design ==
New Jersey Legislature

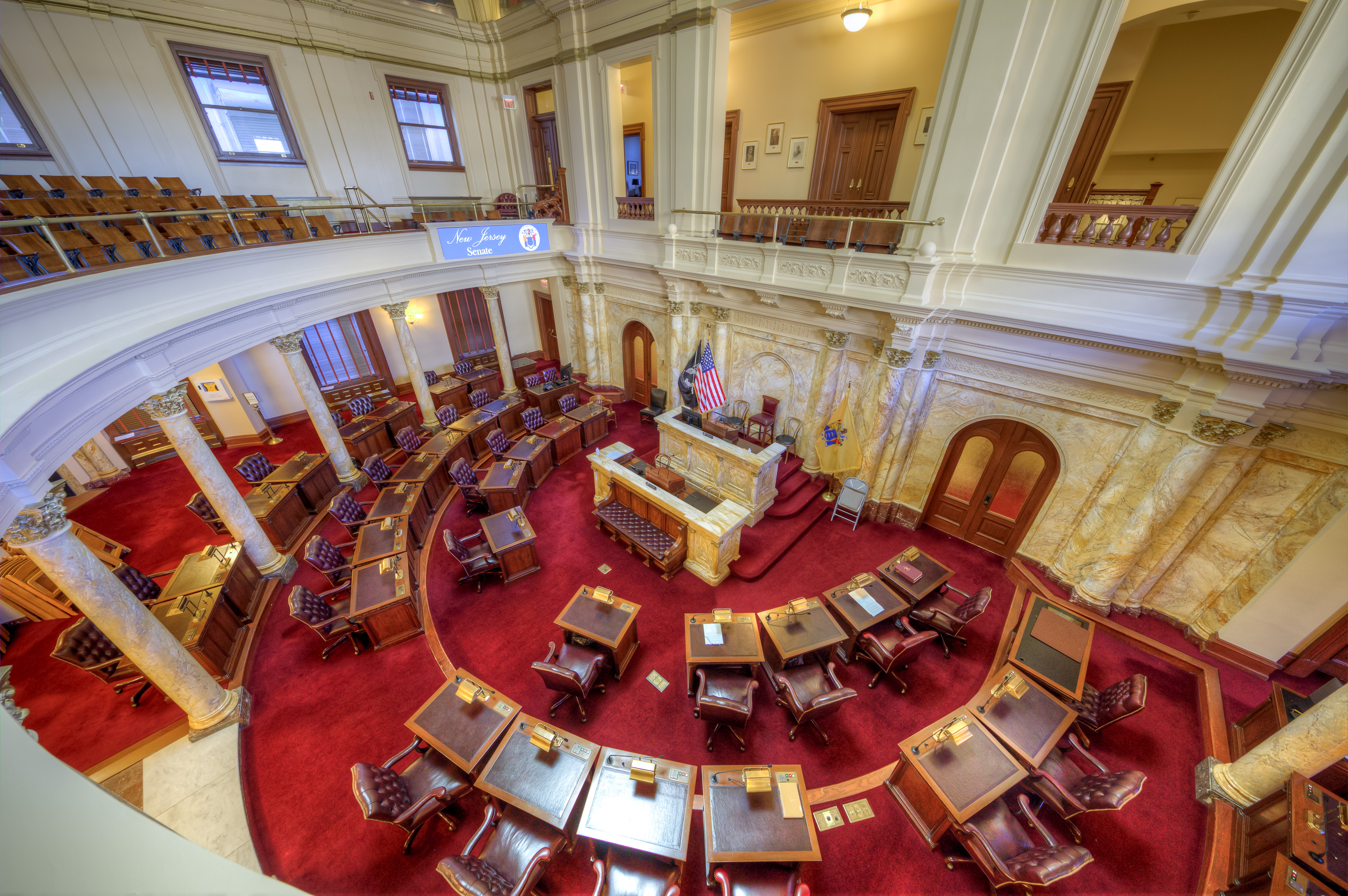
Senate

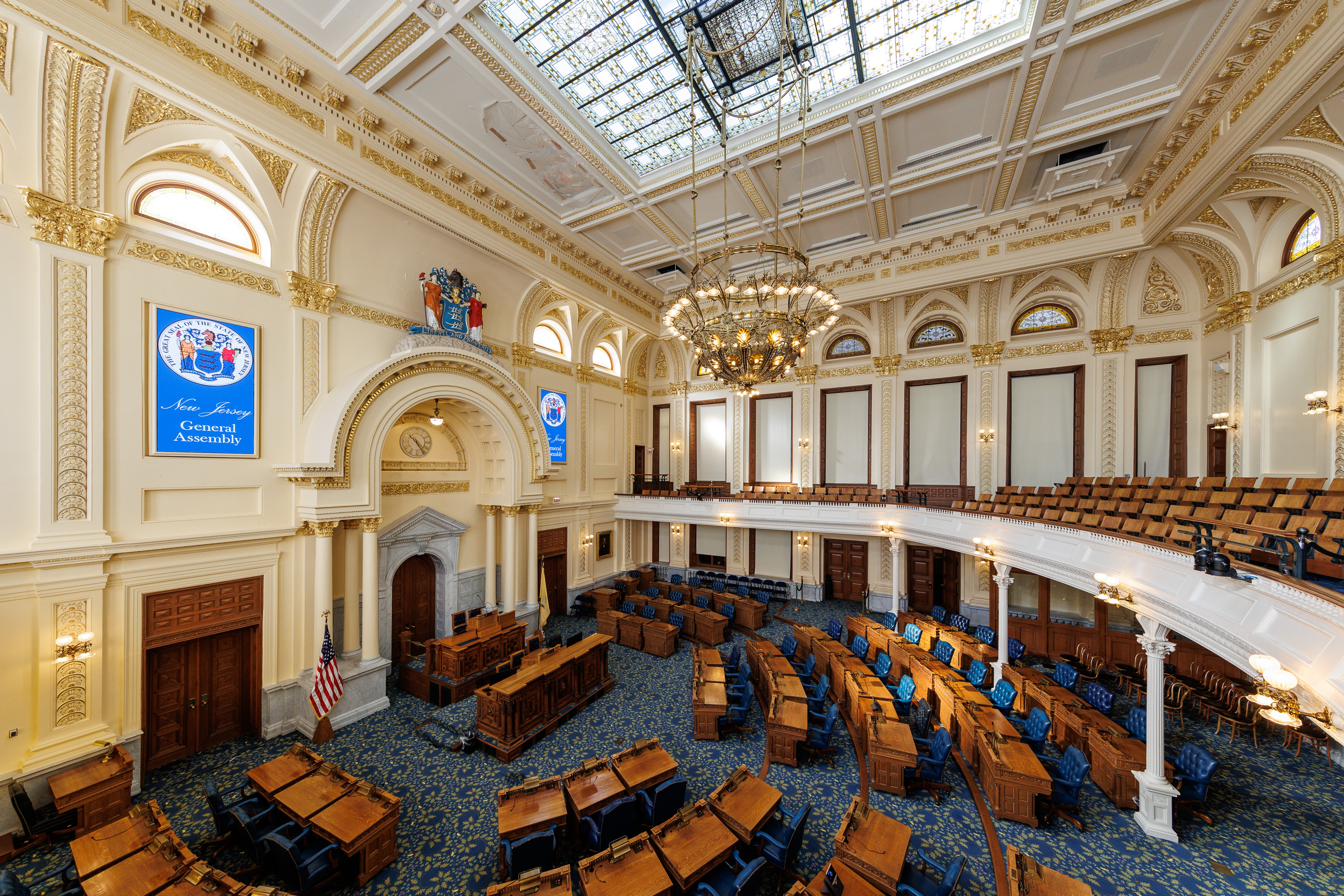
General Assembly

The New Jersey State House is unusual among state capitol buildings in the United States, the majority of which are reminiscent of the U.S. Capitol. The building consists of two parallel structures connected by the dome-capped rotunda, resembling the letter H, with its long arm parallel to State Street. A long portico wing, added by Notman and subsequently enlarged, extends west from the rotunda toward the Delaware River. To this portico, a number of architecturally dissimilar, unusually shaped structures have been added. These structures have been the subject of subsequent renovations to blend them with the original wing. The State House is set not on a park-like campus, as are many state houses, rather it is integrated into an urban setting along historic State Street and is surrounded by other legislative buildings. The most scenic view of the building is from the west, near the Delaware River, and is the side dominated by the various additions. Viewed from State Street, the dome is scarcely visible and there is little sense of the scale or design of the building. The governor's office occupies the remaining portion of the original 1792 State House.

== National capital ==
From June 30 to November 4, 1783, neighboring Princeton was the provisional capital of the United States and Nassau Hall at Princeton University served as its seat of government. In October of that year, an area near the Falls of the Delaware River at Trenton was selected as the preferred location by New England and the other northern states as a permanent capital for the new country. However, the southern states preferred a location south of the Mason–Dixon line along the Potomac River at or near Georgetown.

Following the American Revolutionary War, the Congress of the Confederation met for two months in Trenton at the French Arms Tavern from November 1, 1784, to December 24, 1784. During this time, Congress appropriated $100,000 to acquire "suitable buildings" for national purposes in the city. In 1785 however, representatives from the southern states prevailed in defeating the Trenton proposal and the Compromise of 1790 secured the location along the Potomac River for Washington, D.C. as the nation's capital.

In 1790, the proposed national capital site along the Delaware River was chosen to be the location of the New Jersey state capital.

From August to November 1799, an outbreak of yellow fever in the then-capital of Philadelphia, forced the Relocation of the United States Government to Trenton, with the United States Department of State headquartered in the State House.

== Tours ==
Tours are offered by reservation daily Monday through Friday, except state holidays. The tours typically include the Senate and Assembly chamber galleries, the rotunda, and governor's office reception room.

== See also ==
- List of New Jersey state legislatures
- List of the oldest buildings in New Jersey
- List of state and territorial capitols in the United States
