= List of capitals in the United States =

All types of U.S. capital cities

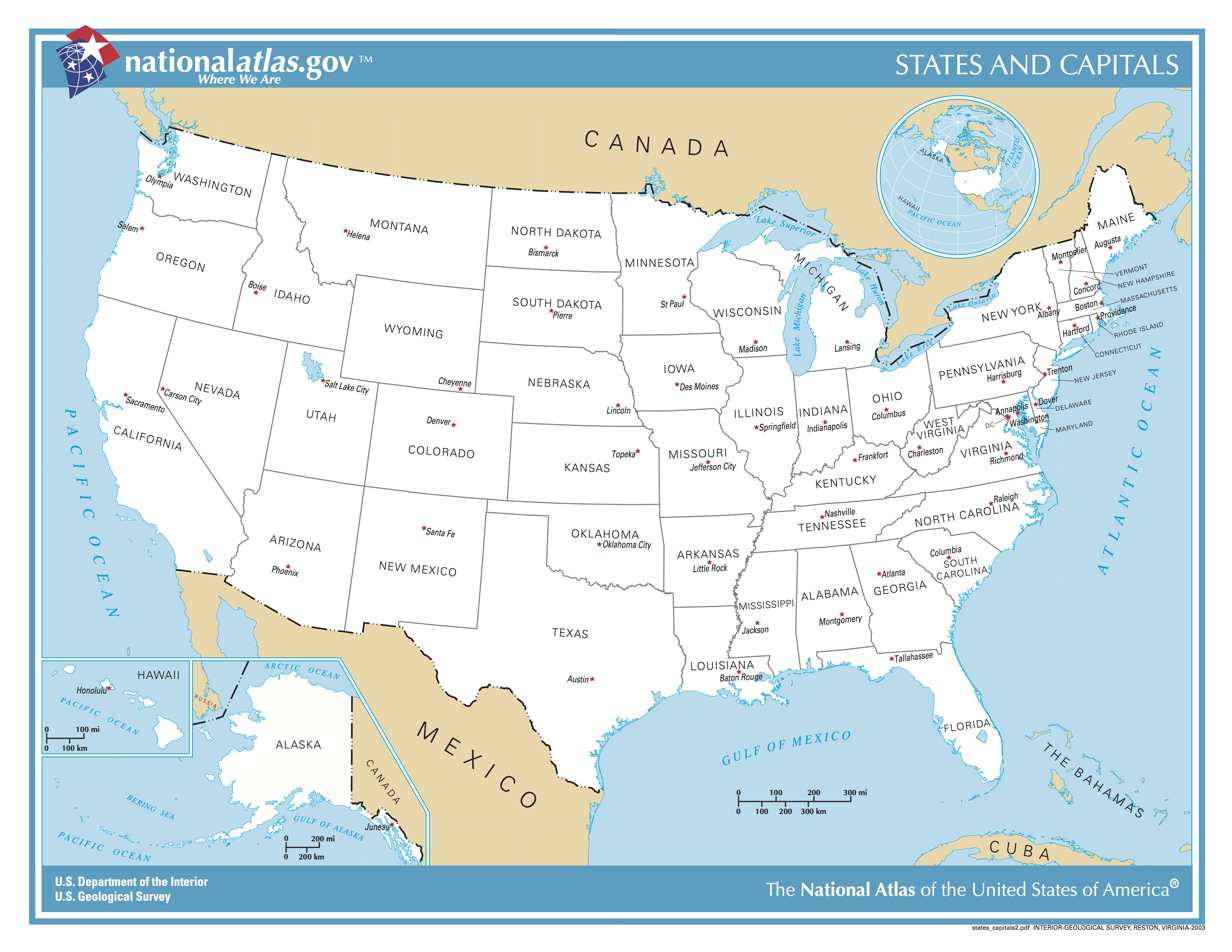
U.S. states with their capitals

This is a list of capital cities of the United States, including places that serve or have served as federal, state, insular area, territorial, colonial and Native American capitals.

Washington, D.C. has been the federal capital of the United States since 1800. Each U.S. state has its own capital city, as do many of its insular areas. Most states have not changed their capital city since becoming a state, but the capital cities of their respective preceding colonies, territories, kingdoms, and republics typically changed multiple times. There have also been other governments within the current borders of the United States with their own capitals, such as the Republic of Texas, Native American nations, and other unrecognized governments.

== National capitals ==
The buildings in cities identified in the chart below served either as official capitals of the United States under the United States Constitution, or, prior to its ratification, sites where the Second Continental Congress or Congress of the Confederation met. The United States did not have a permanent capital under the Articles of Confederation.

The U.S. Constitution was ratified in 1787, and gave the Congress the power to exercise "exclusive legislation" over a district that "may, by Cession of particular States, and the acceptance of Congress, become the Seat of the Government of the United States." The 1st Congress met at Federal Hall in New York. In 1790, it passed the Residence Act, which established the national capital at a site along the Potomac River that would become Washington, D.C. For the next ten years, Philadelphia served as the temporary capital. There, Congress met at Congress Hall. On November 17, 1800, the 6th United States Congress formally convened in Washington, D.C. Congress has met outside of Washington only twice since: on July 16, 1987, at Independence Hall in Philadelphia, to commemorate the 200th anniversary of ratification of the Constitution; and at Federal Hall National Memorial in New York on September 6, 2002, to mark the first anniversary of the September 11 attacks.

City	Building	Start date	End date	Duration	Ref
Second Continental Congress
Philadelphia, Pennsylvania	Pennsylvania State House	July 4, 1776 (Note: Convened May 10, 1775, prior to independence.)	December 12, 1776	5 months and 8 days	
Baltimore, Maryland	Congress Hall	December 20, 1776	February 27, 1777	2 months and 7 days	
Philadelphia, Pennsylvania	Pennsylvania State House	March 5, 1777	September 18, 1777	6 months and 13 days	
Lancaster, Pennsylvania	Lancaster County Courthouse	September 27, 1777	September 27, 1777	1 day	
York, Pennsylvania	York County Courthouse	September 30, 1777	June 27, 1778	8 months and 28 days	
Philadelphia, Pennsylvania	University of Pennsylvania's original College Hall (Note: Extensive damage to the Pennsylvania State House during the British occupation of Philadelphia necessitated this temporary meeting place.)	July 2, 1778	July 13, 1778	11 days	
Philadelphia, Pennsylvania	Pennsylvania State House	July 14, 1778	March 1, 1781	2 years, 7 months and 15 days	
Congress of the Confederation
Philadelphia, Pennsylvania	Pennsylvania State House	March 2, 1781	June 21, 1783	2 years, 3 months and 19 days	
Princeton, New Jersey (Note: Congress was forced to move from Philadelphia due to a mutiny carried out by disgruntled soldiers of the Continental Army.)	Princeton University's Nassau Hall	June 30, 1783	November 4, 1783	4 months and 5 days	
Annapolis, Maryland	Maryland State House	November 26, 1783	August 19, 1784	8 months and 24 days	
Trenton, New Jersey	French Arms Tavern	November 1, 1784	December 24, 1784	1 month and 23 days	
New York, New York	New York City Hall (later known as, Federal Hall)	January 11, 1785	October 6, 1788	3 years, 11 months and 5 days	
New York, New York	Fraunces Tavern	October 6, 1788	March 3, 1789	4 months and 25 days	
United States Congress
New York, New York	Federal Hall	March 4, 1789	December 5, 1790	1 year, 9 months and 1 day	
Philadelphia, Pennsylvania	Congress Hall	December 6, 1790	May 14, 1800	9 years, 5 months and 8 days (Note: Government offices were evacuated to Trenton, New Jersey, from August to November 1799 following an outbreak of yellow fever in Philadelphia.)	
Washington, D.C.	United States Capitol	November 17, 1800 (Note: The District of Columbia was formed February 27, 1801, with the District of Columbia Organic Act of 1801. The city of Washington was founded in 1791 and construction of the new capital began while it was still part of Maryland. President John Adams moved to the White House on November 1, 1800, and the 6th United States Congress held its first session in Washington on November 17, 1800.)	August 24, 1814 (Note: President James Madison fled to the home of Caleb Bentley in Brookeville, Maryland following the burning of Washington on August 24–25, 1814. As such, the town claims to have been the "U.S. Capital for a Day" despite the fact that Congress never met there.)	13 years, 9 months and 7 days	
Washington, D.C.	General and City Post Office Building	September 19, 1814	December 7, 1815	1 year, 2 months and 18 days	
Washington, D.C.	Brick Capitol	December 4, 1815	March 3, 1819	3 years, 2 months and 27 days	
Washington, D.C.	United States Capitol	March 4, 1819	present	207 years, 8 months and 8 days	

== State capitals ==
States (highlighted in purple) whose capital city is also their most populous

States (highlighted in blue) that have changed their capital city at least once

Each state has a capital that serves as the seat of its government. Ten of the thirteen original states and 15 other states have changed their capital city at least once; the last state to move its capital city was Oklahoma in 1910.

In the following table, the "Since" column shows the year that the city began serving as the state's capital (or the capital of the entities that preceded it). The MSA/μSA and CSA columns display the population of the metro area the city is a part of, and should not be construed to mean the population of the city's sphere of influence or that the city is an anchor for the metro area. Fields colored light yellow denote that the population is a micropolitan statistical area.

State	Capital	Since	Area	Population (2020 US Census)			City rank in state
State	Capital	Since	Area	City	MSA/μSA	CSA	City rank in state
Alabama	Montgomery	1846	159.8 mi^{2} (414 km^{2})	200,603	386,047	476,207	3
Alaska	Juneau	1906	2,716.7 mi^{2} (7,036 km^{2})	32,255	32,255		3
Arizona	Phoenix	1889	517.6 mi^{2} (1,341 km^{2})	1,608,139	4,845,832	4,899,104	1
Arkansas	Little Rock	1821	116.2 mi^{2} (301 km^{2})	202,591	748,031	912,604	1
California	Sacramento	1854	97.9 mi^{2} (254 km^{2})	524,943	2,397,382	2,680,831	6
Colorado	Denver	1867	153.3 mi^{2} (397 km^{2})	715,522	2,963,821	3,623,560	1
Connecticut	Hartford	1875	17.3 mi^{2} (45 km^{2})	121,054	1,213,531	1,482,086	4
Delaware	Dover	1777	22.4 mi^{2} (58 km^{2})	39,403	181,851	7,379,700	2
Florida	Tallahassee	1824	95.7 mi^{2} (248 km^{2})	196,169	384,298		8
(Georgia (U.S. state)) Georgia	Atlanta	1868	133.5 mi^{2} (346 km^{2})	498,715	6,089,815	6,930,423	1
Hawaii	Honolulu	1845	68.4 mi^{2} (177 km^{2})	350,964	1,016,508		1
Idaho	Boise	1865	63.8 mi^{2} (165 km^{2})	235,684	764,718	850,341	1
Illinois	Springfield	1837	54.0 mi^{2} (140 km^{2})	114,394	208,640	308,523	7
Indiana	Indianapolis	1825	361.5 mi^{2} (936 km^{2})	887,642	2,111,040	2,492,514	1
Iowa	Des Moines	1857	75.8 mi^{2} (196 km^{2})	214,133	709,466	890,322	1
Kansas	Topeka	1856	56.0 mi^{2} (145 km^{2})	126,587	233,152		5
Kentucky	Frankfort	1792	14.7 mi^{2} (38 km^{2})	28,602	75,393	746,045	15
Louisiana	Baton Rouge	1880	76.8 mi^{2} (199 km^{2})	227,470	870,569		2
Maine	Augusta	1832	55.4 mi^{2} (143 km^{2})	18,899	123,642		12
Maryland	Annapolis	1694	6.73 mi^{2} (17 km^{2})	40,812	2,844,510	9,973,383	7
Massachusetts	Boston	1630	89.6 mi^{2} (232 km^{2})	675,647	4,941,632	8,466,186	1
Michigan	Lansing	1847	35.0 mi^{2} (91 km^{2})	112,644	541,297		5
Minnesota	Saint Paul	1849	52.8 mi^{2} (137 km^{2})	311,527	3,690,261	4,078,788	2
Mississippi	Jackson	1864	104.9 mi^{2} (272 km^{2})	153,701	591,978	671,607	1
Missouri	Jefferson City	1826	27.3 mi^{2} (71 km^{2})	43,228	150,309		15
Montana	Helena	1875	14.0 mi^{2} (36 km^{2})	32,091	83,058		6
Nebraska	Lincoln	1867	74.6 mi^{2} (193 km^{2})	291,082	340,217	361,921	2
Nevada	Carson City	1861	143.4 mi^{2} (371 km^{2})	58,639	58,639	657,958	6
New Hampshire	Concord	1808	64.3 mi^{2} (167 km^{2})	43,976	153,808	8,466,186	3
New Jersey	Trenton	1784	7.66 mi^{2} (20 km^{2})	90,871	387,340	23,582,649	10
New Mexico	Santa Fe	1610	37.3 mi^{2} (97 km^{2})	87,505	154,823	1,162,523	4
(New York (state)) New York	Albany	1797	21.4 mi^{2} (55 km^{2})	99,224	899,262	1,190,727	6
North Carolina	Raleigh	1792	114.6 mi^{2} (297 km^{2})	467,665	1,413,982	2,106,463	2
North Dakota	Bismarck	1883	26.9 mi^{2} (70 km^{2})	73,622	133,626		2
Ohio	Columbus	1816	210.3 mi^{2} (545 km^{2})	905,748	2,138,926	2,544,048	1
Oklahoma	Oklahoma City	1910	620.3 mi^{2} (1,607 km^{2})	681,054	1,425,695	1,498,149	1
Oregon	Salem	1855	45.7 mi^{2} (118 km^{2})	175,535	433,353	3,280,736	3
Pennsylvania	Harrisburg	1812	8.11 mi^{2} (21 km^{2})	50,099	591,712	1,295,259	9
Rhode Island	Providence	1900	18.5 mi^{2} (48 km^{2})	190,934	1,676,579	8,466,186	1
South Carolina	Columbia	1786	125.2 mi^{2} (324 km^{2})	136,632	829,470	951,412	2
South Dakota	Pierre	1889	13.0 mi^{2} (34 km^{2})	14,091	20,745		9
Tennessee	Nashville	1826?	525.9 mi^{2} (1,362 km^{2})	689,447	1,989,519	2,118,233	1
Texas	Austin	1836	305.1 mi^{2} (790 km^{2})	961,855	2,283,371		4
Utah	Salt Lake City	1858	109.1 mi^{2} (283 km^{2})	199,723	1,257,936	2,701,129	1
Vermont	Montpelier	1805	10.2 mi^{2} (26 km^{2})	8,074	59,807	285,369	6
Virginia	Richmond	1780	60.1 mi^{2} (156 km^{2})	226,610	1,314,434		4
(Washington (state)) Washington	Olympia	1853	16.7 mi^{2} (43 km^{2})	55,605	294,793	4,953,421	23
West Virginia	Charleston	1885	31.6 mi^{2} (82 km^{2})	48,864	258,859	779,969	1
Wisconsin	Madison	1838	68.7 mi^{2} (178 km^{2})	269,840	680,796	910,246	2
Wyoming	Cheyenne	1869	21.1 mi^{2} (55 km^{2})	65,132	100,512		1

== Insular area capitals ==
An insular area is a United States territory that is neither a part of one of the fifty states nor a part of the District of Columbia, the nation's federal district. Those insular areas with territorial capitals are listed below.

Capitals of United States Insular Areas
Insular area	Capital	Since	Pop. (2010)	Notes
American Samoa	Pago Pago	1899	3,656	Pago Pago refers to both a village and a group of villages, one of which is Fagatogo, the official seat of government stated in the territory's constitution.
Guam	Hagåtña	1898	1,051	Dededo is the area's largest village.
Northern Mariana Islands	Saipan	1947	48,220	Since the entire island, of 46 sq mi (120 km^{2}), is organized as a single municipality, most publications designate the whole of Saipan as the Commonwealth's capital. Most government functions are based in the Capitol Hill village, except for the judicial branch which is located in Susupe.
Puerto Rico	San Juan	1898	395,326	The oldest continuously inhabited U.S. state or territorial capital, San Juan was originally called Puerto Rico while the island was called San Juan Bautista.
(United States Virgin Islands) U.S. Virgin Islands	Charlotte Amalie	1917	18,481	Like the rest of the U.S. Virgin Islands, Charlotte Amalie (located on the island of Saint Thomas) has no local government and is directly administered by the territorial government. However, it has boundaries defined by the Virgin Islands Code and is recognized as a town by the U.S. Census Bureau.

== Former national capitals ==
Four of the 50 U.S. states—Hawaii, Texas, California, and Vermont—were once de jure sovereign states with diplomatic recognition from the international community. California did not have a capital during its time as a sovereign nation.

=== Hawaii ===
During its history as a sovereign nation (Kingdom of Hawaii, 1795–1893; Republic of Hawaii, 1894–1898), five sites served as the capital of Hawaii:

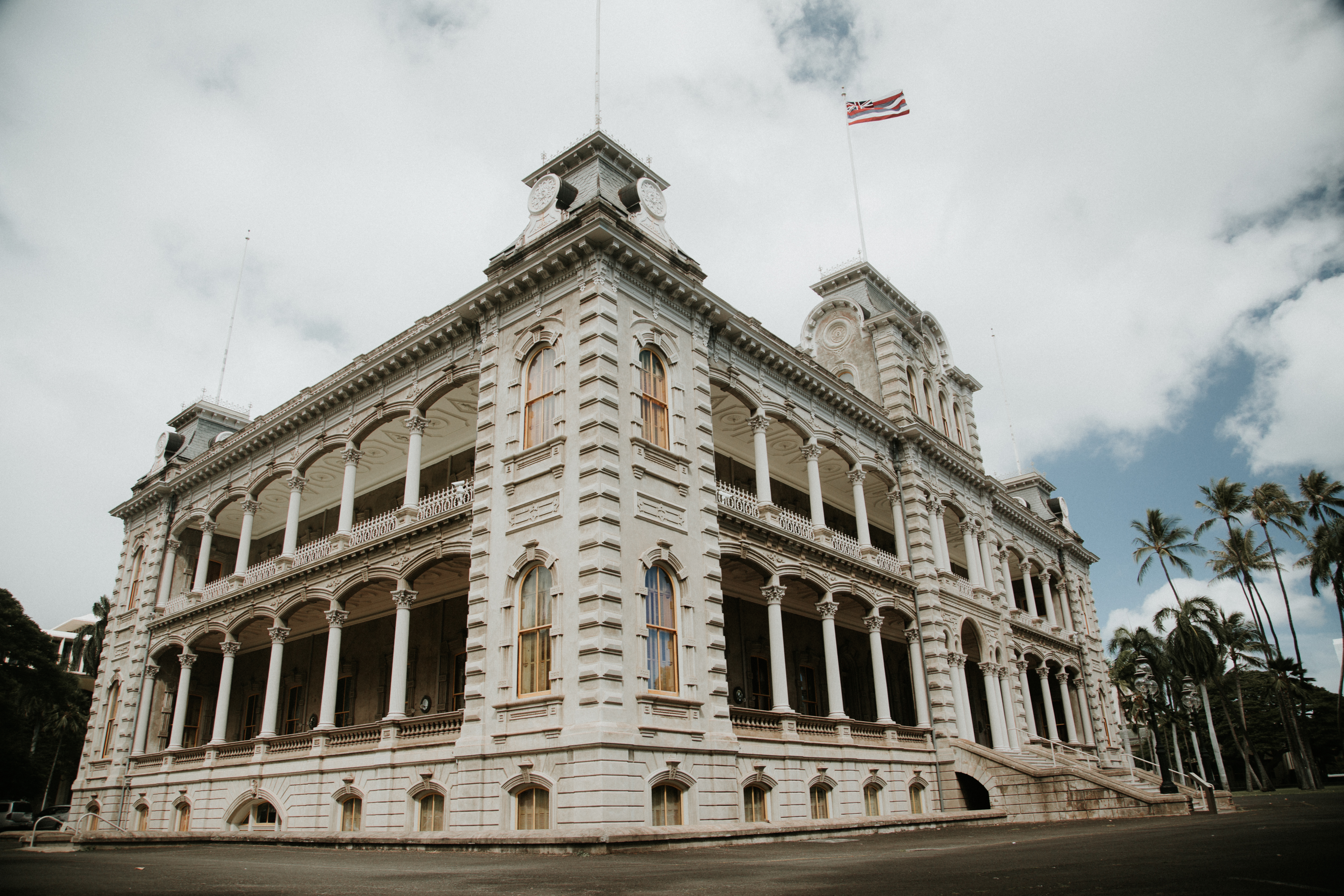
Honolulu has served as the capital of Hawaii since it was an independent kingdom. The Iolani Palace (pictured) served as the seat of government until 1969. Currently, the governor of Hawaii resides at Washington Place.

- Waikīkī, 1795–1796
- Hilo, 1796–1803
- Honolulu, 1803–1812
- Kailua-Kona, 1812–1820
- Lahaina, 1820–1845
- Honolulu, 1845–1898

Annexed by the United States in 1898, Honolulu remained the capital, first of the Territory of Hawaii (1900–1959), and then of the state (since 1959).

=== Texas ===
During its history as a sovereign nation (Republic of Texas, 1836–1845), seven sites served as the capital of Texas:

- Washington (now Washington-on-the-Brazos), 1836
- Harrisburg (now part of Houston), 1836
- Galveston, 1836
- Velasco, 1836
- West Columbia, 1836
- Houston, 1837–1839
- Austin, 1839–1845

Annexed by the United States in 1845, Austin remains the capital of the state of Texas.

=== Vermont ===
Three sites have served as the capital of the Vermont Republic:

- Westminster, 1777
- Windsor, 1777–1791
- Castleton, 1791

When the state was admitted to the Union in 1791, Burlington was chosen to be the capital and it remained as such until 1805, when it was changed to Montpelier, where it remains today.

== Native American capitals ==
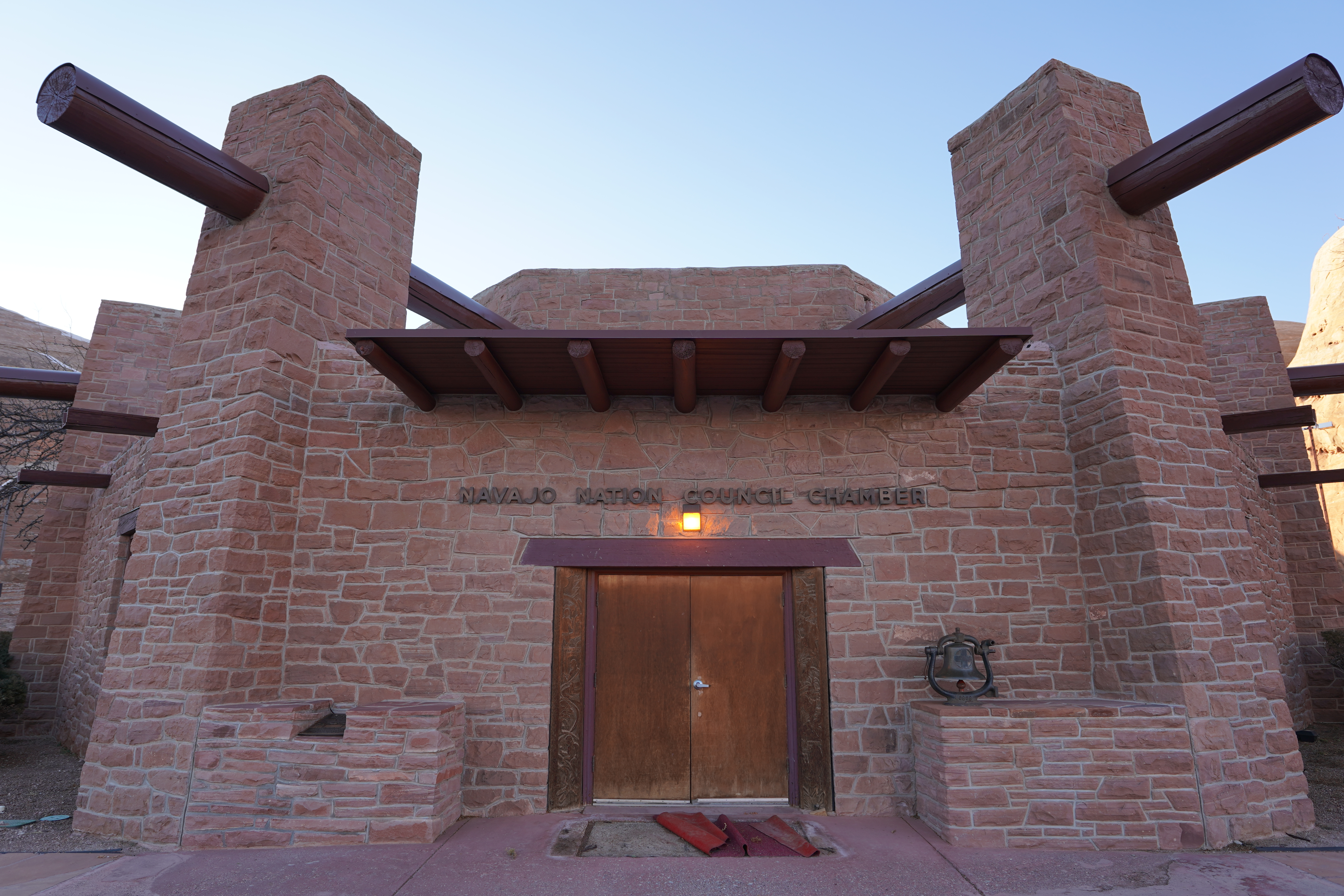
The Navajo Nation Council Chamber in Window Rock, Arizona is the center of government for the Navajo Nation

Some Native American tribes, in particular the Five Civilized Tribes, organized their states with constitutions and capitals in Western style. Others, like the Iroquois, had long-standing, pre-Columbian traditions of a 'capitol' longhouse where wampum and council fires were maintained with special status. Since they did business with the U.S. Federal Government, these capitals can be seen as officially recognized in some sense.

=== Cherokee Nation ===
- New Echota 1825–1832

New Echota, now near Calhoun, Georgia, was founded in 1825, realizing the dream and plans of Cherokee Chief Major Ridge. Major Ridge chose the site because of its centrality in the historic Cherokee Nation which spanned parts of Georgia, North Carolina, Tennessee and Alabama, and because it was near the confluence of the Conasauga and Coosawattee rivers. The town's layout was partly inspired by Ridge's many visits to Washington D.C. and to Baltimore, but also invoked traditional themes of the Southeastern ceremonial complex. Complete with the Council House, Supreme Court, Cherokee syllabary printing press, and the houses of several of the Nation's constitutional officers, New Echota served as the capital until 1832 when the state of Georgia outlawed Native American assembly in an attempt to undermine the Nation. Thousands of Cherokee would gather in New Echota for the annual National Councils, camping along the nearby rivers and holding long stomp dances in the park-like woods that were typical of many Southeastern Native American settlements.

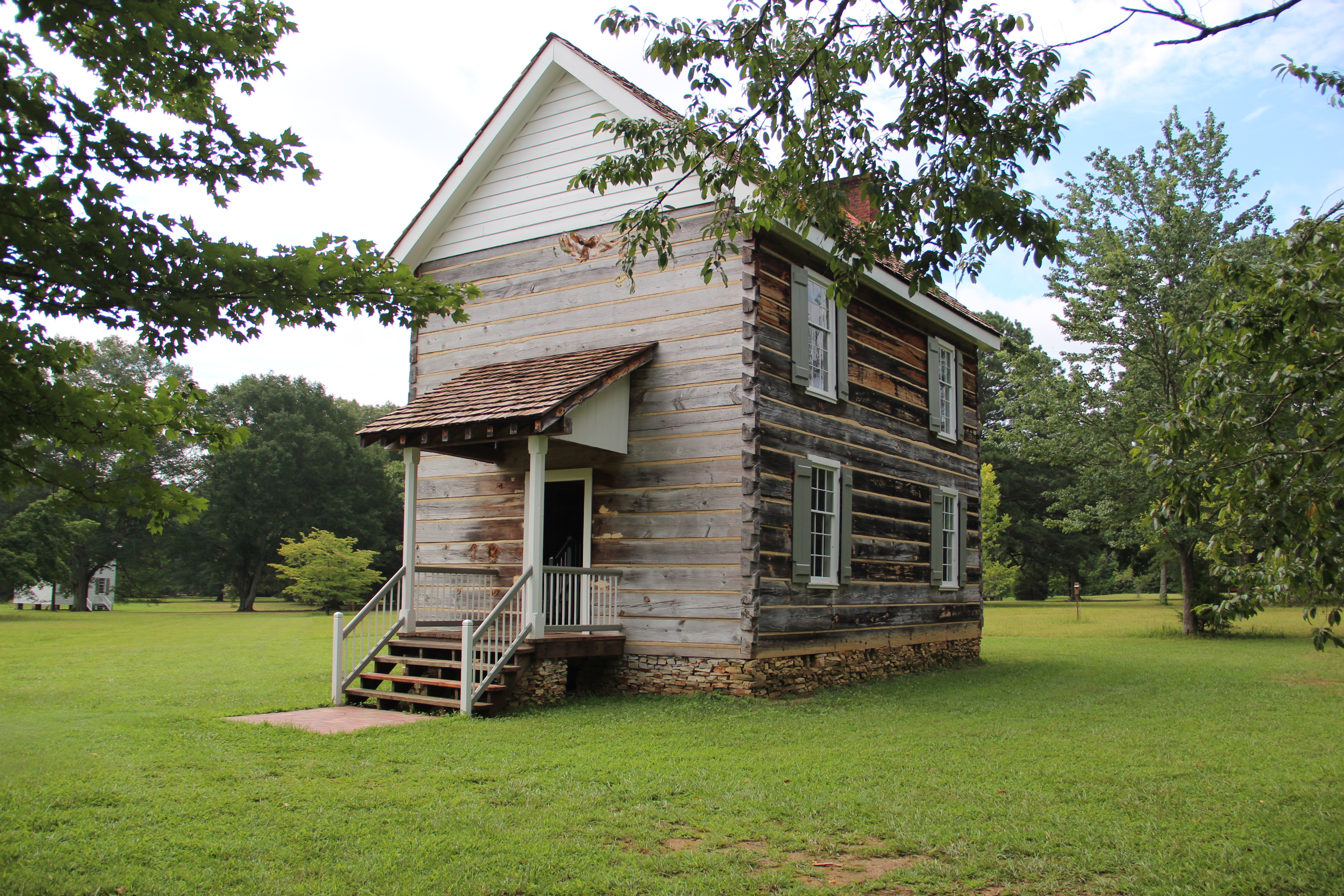
The New Echota Council House (since reconstructed)

- Red Clay 1832–1838

The Cherokee National council grounds were moved to Red Clay, Tennessee, on the Georgia state line, in order to evade the Georgia state militia. The log cabins, limestone springs, and park-like woods of Red Clay served as the capital until the Cherokee Nation was removed to Indian Territory (Oklahoma) on the Trail of Tears.

- Tahlequah 1839–1907, 1938–present

Tahlequah, in present-day Oklahoma, served as the capital of the original Cherokee Nation after Removal. After the Civil War, a turbulent period for the Nation which was involved in its own civil war resulting from pervasive anger and disagreements over removal from Georgia, the Cherokee Nation built a new National Capitol in Tahlequah out of brick. The building served as the capitol until 1907, when the Dawes Act finally dissolved the Cherokee Nation and Tahlequah became the county seat of Cherokee County, Oklahoma. The Cherokee National government was re-established in 1938 and Tahlequah remains the capital of the modern Cherokee Nation; it is also the capital of the United Keetoowah Band of Cherokee Indians.

- Cherokee 20th century–present (Eastern Band of Cherokee)

Approximately four to eight hundred Cherokees escaped removal because they lived on a separated tract, purchased later with the help of Confederate Colonel William Holland Thomas, along the Oconaluftee River deep in the Smoky Mountains of North Carolina. Some Cherokees fleeing the Federal Army, sent for the "round up", fled to the remote settlements separated from the rest of the Cherokee Territory in Georgia and North Carolina, in order to remain in their homeland. In the 20th century, their descendants organized as the Eastern Band of Cherokee Indians; its capital is at Cherokee, North Carolina, in the tribally-controlled Qualla Boundary.

=== Muscogee Creek Nation ===
- Hot Springs, Arkansas c. 1837–1866

After Removal from their Alabama-Georgia homeland, the Creek national government met near Hot Springs which was then part of their new territory as prescribed in the Treaty of Cusseta. Because some Creeks fought with the Confederacy in the American Civil War, the Union forced the Creeks to cede over 3,000,000-acre (1,200,000 ha) - half of their land in what is now Arkansas.

- Okmulgee 1867–1906

Served as the National capital after the American Civil War. It was probably named after Ocmulgee, on the Ocmulgee river in Macon, a principle Coosa and later Creek town built with mounds and functioning as part of the Southeastern ceremonial complex. However, there were other traditional Creek "mother-towns" before removal. The Ocmulgee mounds were ceded illegally in 1821 with the Treaty of Indian Springs.

=== Iroquois Confederacy ===
- Onondaga (Onondaga privilege c. 1450–present)

The Iroquois Confederacy or Haudenosaunee, which means "People of the Longhouse", was an alliance between the Five and later Six-Nations of Iroquoian language and culture of upstate New York. These include the Seneca, Cayuga, Onondaga, Oneida, Mohawk, and, after 1722, the Tuscarora Nations. Since the Confederacy's formation around 1450, the Onondaga Nation has held privilege of hosting the Iroquois Grand Council and the status of Keepers of the Fire and the Wampum —which they still do at the official Longhouse on the Onondaga Reservation. Now spread over reservations in New York, Ontario and Quebec the Six Nations of the Haudenosaunee preserve this arrangement to this day in what they claim to be the "world's oldest representative democracy."

==== Seneca Nation of Indians ====
- Jimerson Town (Allegany Reservation)
- Irving (Cattaraugus Reservation)

The Seneca Nation republic was founded in 1848 and has two capitals that rotate responsibilities every two years. Jimerson Town was founded in the 1960s following the formation of the Allegheny Reservoir. The Senecas also have an administrative longhouse in Steamburg but do not consider that location to be a capital.

=== Navajo Nation ===
- Window Rock

Window Rock (Navajo: Tségháhoodzání), Arizona, is a small city that serves as the seat of government and capital of the Navajo Nation (1936–present), the largest territory of a sovereign Native American nation in North America. It lies within the boundaries of the St. Michaels Chapter, adjacent to the Arizona and New Mexico state line. Window Rock hosts the Navajo Nation governmental campus which contains the Navajo Nation Council, Navajo Nation Supreme Court, the offices of the Navajo Nation President and Vice President, and many Navajo government buildings.

=== Pueblo Republic ===
- Taos Pueblo

Tiwa people settled in the Taos Valley around 900 CE. They constructed the oldest building still standing around 1000, with more ones built in the late 1200s and early 1300s. Taos was the most populous city-state of all the Pueblo peoples in the 1540s. It is the origin of the younger Tiwa Pueblos of Picuris, Sandia, Isleta, and Ysleta del Sur. Taos was the headquarters of the Pueblo Revolt in 1680 against the Spanish Empire. After this first successful anti-colonial revolution in the Americas, it became the capital city of the Pueblo republic. Taos Pueblo became the capital of Santa Fe de Nuevo México during the Río Arriba Rebellion of 1837.

== Unrecognized national capitals ==
There have been a handful of self-declared or undeclared nations within the current borders of the United States which were never officially recognized as legally independent sovereign entities; however, these nations did have de facto control over their respective regions during their existence.

=== Colonies of British America ===
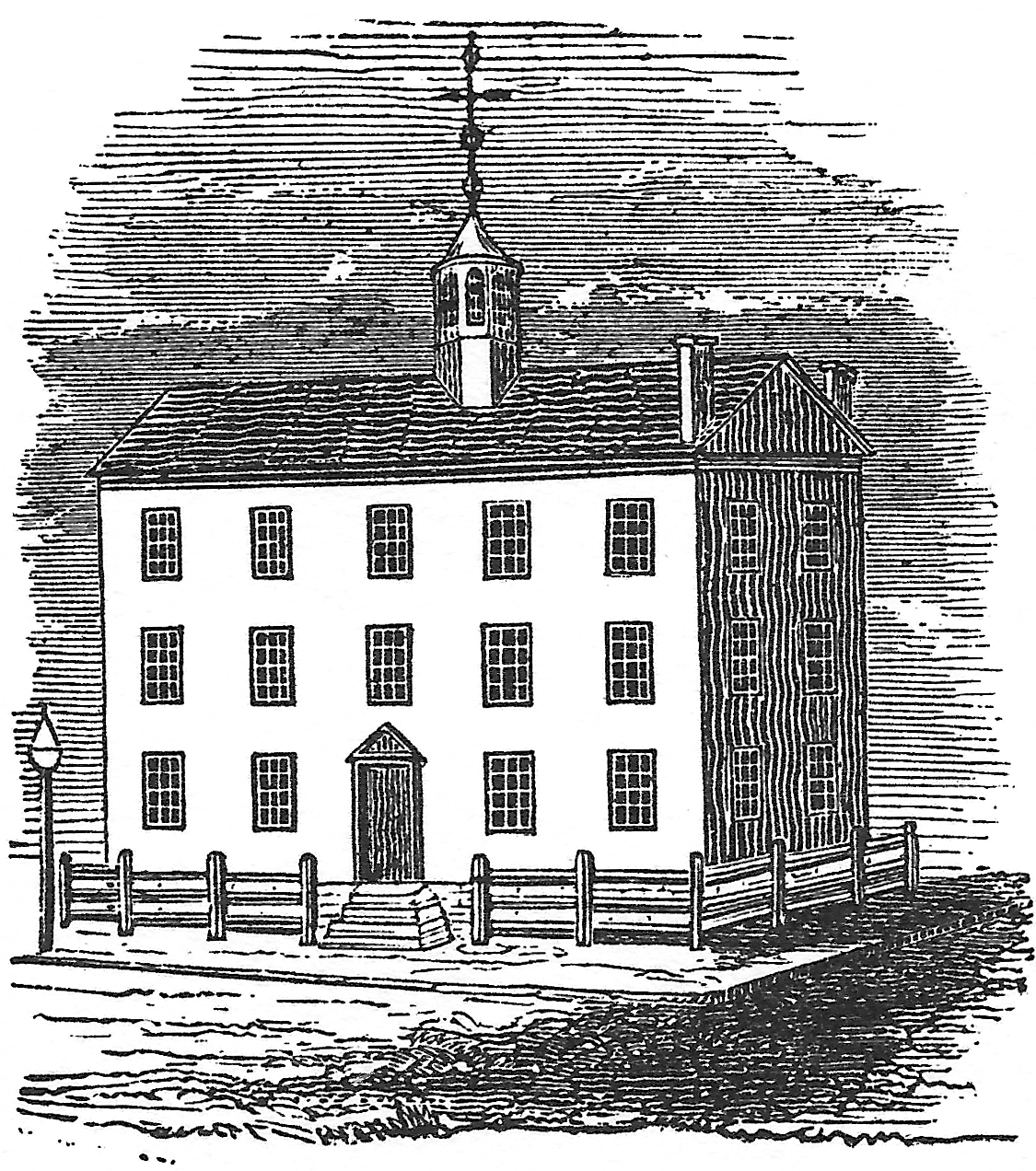
Stadt Huys, the original city hall of Albany, New York and meeting place of the Albany Congress in 1754.

Prior to the independence of the United States from Great Britain, declared July 4, 1776, in the Declaration of Independence and ultimately secured in the American Revolutionary War, several congresses were convened on behalf of some of the colonies of British America. However, these bodies did not address the question of independence from England, and therefore did not designate a national capital. The Second Continental Congress encompassed the period during which the United States declared independence but had not yet established a permanent national capital.

Congress	City	Building	Start date	End date	Duration	Ref
Albany Congress	Albany, New York	Stadt Huys	June 19, 1754	July 11, 1754	22 days	
Stamp Act Congress	New York, New York	City Hall	October 7, 1765	October 25, 1765	23 days	
First Continental Congress	Philadelphia, Pennsylvania	Carpenters' Hall	September 5, 1774	October 26, 1774	1 month and 21 days	
Second Continental Congress	Philadelphia, Pennsylvania	Independence Hall	May 10, 1775	July 4, 1776 ‡	1 year, 1 month and 24 days	

‡ (continuing after independence until December 12, 1776)

=== State of Franklin ===
The State of Franklin was an autonomous, secessionist United States territory created not long after the end of the American Revolution from territory that later was ceded by North Carolina to the federal government. Franklin's territory later became part of the state of Tennessee. Franklin was never officially admitted into the Union of the United States and existed for only four years.

- Jonesborough, Tennessee, 1784–1785
- Greeneville, Tennessee, 1785–1788

=== State of Muskogee ===
The State of Muskogee was a Native American state in Spanish Florida created by the Englishman William Augustus Bowles, who was its "Director General", author of its Constitution, and designer of its flag. It consisted of several tribes of Creeks and Seminoles. It existed from 1799 to 1803. It had one capital:

- Miccosukee, 1799–1803

=== Republic of West Florida ===
The Republic of West Florida was a short-lived nation that broke away from the territory of Spanish West Florida in 1810. It comprised the Florida Parishes of the modern state of Louisiana and the Mobile District of the modern states of Mississippi and Alabama. (The Republic of West Florida did not include any part of the modern state of Florida.) Ownership of the area had been in dispute between Spain and the United States, which claimed that it had been included in the Louisiana Purchase of 1803. Within two months of the settlers' rebellion and the declaration of an independent nation, President James Madison sent American forces to peaceably occupy the new republic. It was formally annexed by the United States in 1812 over the objections of Spain and the land was divided between the Territory of Orleans and Territory of Mississippi. During its brief existence, the capital of the Republic of West Florida was:

- St. Francisville, Louisiana, 1810

=== Republic of Indian Stream ===
The Republic of Indian Stream was an unrecognized independent nation within the present state of New Hampshire.

- The area that would become Pittsburg, New Hampshire, 1832–1835

=== California Republic ===
Before being annexed by the United States in 1848 (following the Mexican–American War), a small portion of north-central California declared itself the California Republic, in an act of independence from Mexico, in 1846 (see Bear Flag Revolt). The republic only existed a month before it disbanded itself to join the advancing American army; its claimed territory later became part of the United States as a result of the Mexican Cession.

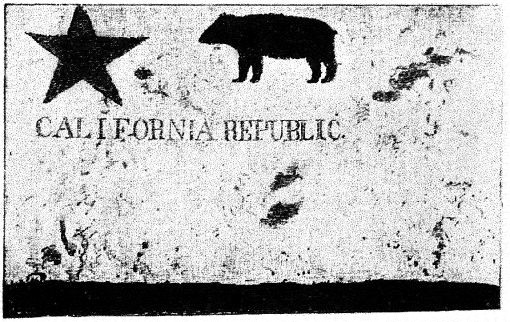
The original of Todd's Bear Flag, photographed in 1890

Modern flag of the State of California

The very short-lived California Republic was never recognized by the United States, Mexico or any other nation. The flag, featuring a silhouette of a California grizzly bear, a star, and the words "California Republic", became known as the Bear Flag and was later the basis for the official state flag of California.

There was one de facto capital of the California Republic:

- Sonoma, 1846

=== Confederate States ===
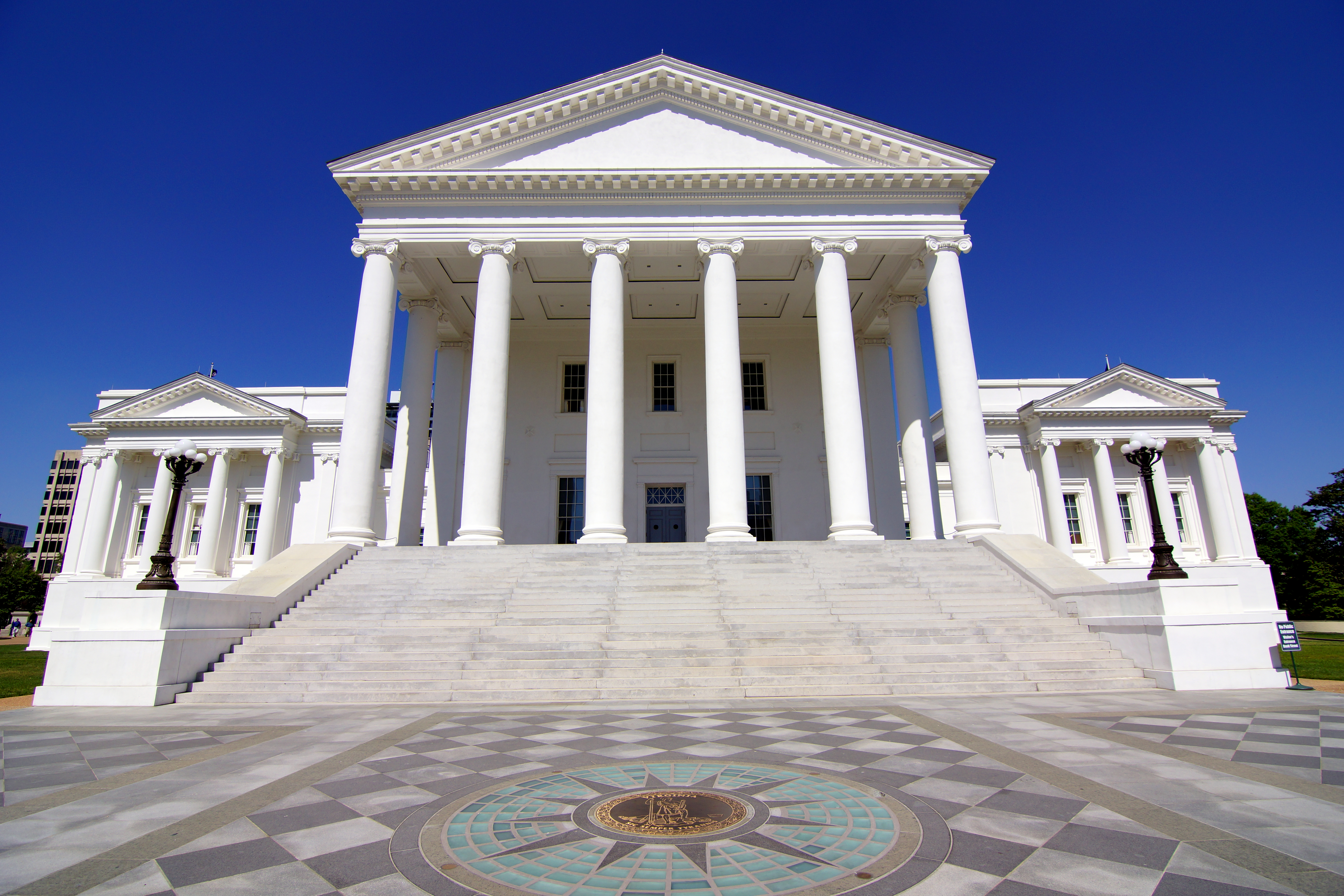
Richmond served as the second capital of the Confederate States of America. The city has been Virginia's capital since 1780.

The Confederate States of America (C.S.A.) had three capitals during its existence. The first capital was established February 4, 1861, in Montgomery, Alabama, and remained there until it was moved to Richmond, Virginia, on May 29, 1861, after Virginia seceded on May 23.

The individual state capitals remained the same in the Confederacy as they had been in the Union (U.S.A.), although as the advancing Union Army used those cities for military districts, some of the Confederate governments were relocated or moved out of state, traveling along with secessionist armies.

- Montgomery, Alabama, February 4 – May 29, 1861
- Richmond, Virginia, May 29, 1861 – April 3, 1865
- Danville, Virginia, April 2 – May 10, 1865

==== Free State of Jones ====
In 1863 and 1864, Jones County, Mississippi revolted against Confederate rule and became practically independent under the name Free State of Jones. The Free State fought a number of skirmishes with Confederate troops. By the spring of 1864 the Jones County rebels had taken effective control of the county from the Confederate government, raised an American flag over the courthouse in Ellisville, and sent a letter to Union General William T. Sherman declaring Jones County's independence from the Confederacy.

Scholars have disputed whether the county truly seceded, with some concluding it did not fully secede. Lack of documentation makes the situation difficult to assess. The rebellion in Jones County has been variously characterized as consisting of local skirmishes to being a full-fledged war of independence.

- Ellisville, Mississippi

== Historical state, colonial, and territorial capitals ==
Most of the original Thirteen Colonies had their capitals occupied or attacked by the British during the American Revolutionary War. State governments operated where and as they could. The City of New York was occupied by British troops from 1776 to 1783. A similar situation occurred during the War of 1812, during the American Civil War in many Confederate states, and during the Pueblo Revolt of 1680–1692 in New Mexico.

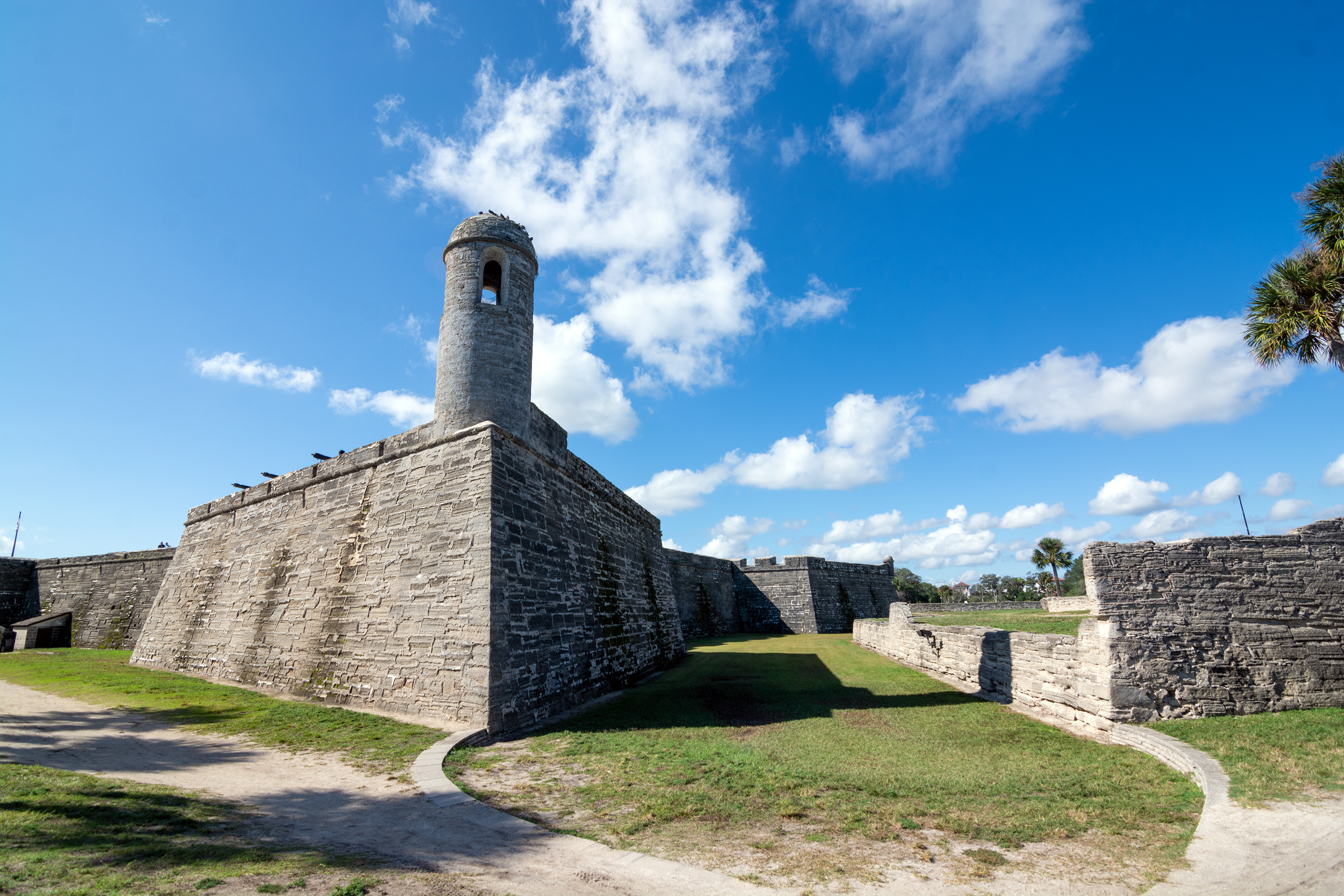
St. Augustine served as Florida's capital from 1565 until the 1820s.

Twenty-two state capitals have been a capital longer than their state has been a state, since they served as the capital of a predecessor territory, colony, or republic. Boston, Massachusetts, has been a capital city since 1630; it is the oldest continuously running capital in the United States. Santa Fe, New Mexico, is the oldest capital city, having become capital in 1610 and though interrupted by the Pueblo Revolt and Pueblo republic from 1680-1692 and the Rio Arriba Rebellion of 1837, when the capital was moved to Taos Pueblo, which was established around 1000 is the oldest city in the United States. The Spanish of St. Augustine, Florida was the first European settlement in the United States and served as a colonial capital from 1565 until about 1820, more than 250 years.

The table below includes the following information:

1. The state, the year in which statehood was granted, and the state's capital are shown in **bold** type. NOTE: For the first thirteen states, formerly the Thirteen Colonies of Great Britain on the Atlantic seaboard, the year of statehood is shown as 1776 (United States Declaration of Independence) rather than the subsequent year each state ratified the 1787 United States Constitution. (See List of U.S. states by date of admission to the Union.)
2. The year listed for each capital is the starting date; the ending date is the starting date for the successor unless otherwise indicated.
3. In many cases, capital cities of historical jurisdictions were outside of a state's present borders. (Those cities are generally indicated with the two-letter abbreviation for the U.S. state in which the former administrative capital is now located.)

Historical capitals in the United States of America
State	Capital	Date	Notes
**Alabama**; Statehood in 1819	San Agustín (FL)	1565	Capital of the Spanish colony of La Florida. (Note: The Spanish name La Florida originally referred to all of the American continent north of Mexico. As other European nations colonized North America, the extent of La Florida shrank to encompass only the Spanish territorial claims in the southeastern portion of the present United States.)
**Alabama**; Statehood in 1819	Savannah (GA)	1733	Capital of the British proprietary Colony of Georgia.
**Alabama**; Statehood in 1819	Savannah (GA)	1755	Capital of the British Province of Georgia.
**Alabama**; Statehood in 1819	Savannah (GA)	1776	Capitals of the State of Georgia.
**Alabama**; Statehood in 1819	Augusta (GA)	1778	Capitals of the State of Georgia.
**Alabama**; Statehood in 1819	Heard's Fort (GA)	1780	Capitals of the State of Georgia.
**Alabama**; Statehood in 1819	Augusta (GA)	1781	Capitals of the State of Georgia.
**Alabama**; Statehood in 1819	Savannah (GA)	1782	Capitals of the State of Georgia.
**Alabama**; Statehood in 1819	Ebenezer (GA)	1782	Capitals of the State of Georgia.
**Alabama**; Statehood in 1819	Savannah (GA)	1784	Capitals of the State of Georgia.
**Alabama**; Statehood in 1819	Augusta (GA)	1786	Capitals of the State of Georgia.
**Alabama**; Statehood in 1819	Louisville (GA)	1796	Capitals of the State of Georgia.
**Alabama**; Statehood in 1819	Natchez (MS)	1798	Capitals of the Mississippi Territory.
**Alabama**; Statehood in 1819	Washington (MS)	1802	Capitals of the Mississippi Territory.
**Alabama**; Statehood in 1819	St. Stephens	1817	Capital of the Alabama Territory.
**Alabama**; Statehood in 1819	Huntsville	**1819**	Capitals of the State of Alabama.
**Alabama**; Statehood in 1819	Cahawba	1820	Capitals of the State of Alabama.
**Alabama**; Statehood in 1819	Tuscaloosa	1826	Capitals of the State of Alabama.
**Alabama**; Statehood in 1819	**Montgomery**	1846	**Capital of the State of Alabama**. (Capital of the Confederate States of America in 1861.)
**Alaska**; Statehood in 1959	Novo-Arkhangelsk; Sitka	1808	Capital of the Russian colony of Alaska.
**Alaska**; Statehood in 1959	Novo-Arkhangelsk; Sitka	1867	Capital of the Department of Alaska.
**Alaska**; Statehood in 1959	Novo-Arkhangelsk; Sitka	1900	Capitals of the District of Alaska.
**Alaska**; Statehood in 1959	**Juneau**	1906	Capitals of the District of Alaska.
**Alaska**; Statehood in 1959	**Juneau**	1912	Capital of the Territory of Alaska.
**Alaska**; Statehood in 1959	**Juneau**	**1959**	**Capital of the State of Alaska**.
**Arizona**; Statehood in 1912	Santa Fe (NM)	1848	Capital of the U.S. provisional government of New Mexico 1848–1850.
**Arizona**; Statehood in 1912	Santa Fe (NM)	1850	Capital of the U.S. Territory of New Mexico 1850–1912.
**Arizona**; Statehood in 1912	Mesilla (NM)	1862	Capital of the Confederate Territory of Arizona (southern New Mexico and Arizona 1862).
**Arizona**; Statehood in 1912	San Antonio (TX)	1862	Capital of the government-in-exile of the Confederate Territory of Arizona 1862–1865.
**Arizona**; Statehood in 1912	Fort Whipple	1864	Capitals of the U.S. Territory of Arizona.
**Arizona**; Statehood in 1912	Prescott	1864	Capitals of the U.S. Territory of Arizona.
**Arizona**; Statehood in 1912	Tucson	1867	Capitals of the U.S. Territory of Arizona.
**Arizona**; Statehood in 1912	Prescott	1877	Capitals of the U.S. Territory of Arizona.
**Arizona**; Statehood in 1912	**Phoenix**	1889	Capitals of the U.S. Territory of Arizona.
**Arizona**; Statehood in 1912	**Phoenix**	**1912**	**Capital of the State of Arizona**.
**Arkansas**; Statehood in 1836	Saint-Louis; San Luis; St. Louis (MO)	1765	Capital of the Spanish (though predominantly Francophone) district of Alta Louisiana.
**Arkansas**; Statehood in 1836	Saint-Louis; San Luis; St. Louis (MO)	1800	Capital of the French district of La Haute-Louisiane.
**Arkansas**; Statehood in 1836	Saint-Louis; San Luis; St. Louis (MO)	1804	Capital of the District of Louisiana (under the authority of the Indiana Territory).
**Arkansas**; Statehood in 1836	Saint-Louis; San Luis; St. Louis (MO)	1805	Capital of the Louisiana Territory.
**Arkansas**; Statehood in 1836	Saint-Louis; San Luis; St. Louis (MO)	1812	Capital of the Missouri Territory.
**Arkansas**; Statehood in 1836	Arkansas Post	1819	Capitals of the Arkansaw Territory. (Note: The name Arkansas has been pronounced and spelled in a variety of fashions. The region was organized as the Territory of Arkansaw on July 4, 1819, but the territory was admitted to the Union as the State of Arkansas on June 15, 1836. The name was historically pronounced /ˈɑːrkənsɔː/, /ɑːrˈkænzəs/, and several other variants. In 1881, the Arkansas General Assembly passed the following concurrent resolution (Arkansas Statutes, Title 1, Chapter 4, Section 105): Whereas, confusion of practice has arisen in the pronunciation of the name of our state and it is deemed important that the true pronunciation should be determined for use in oral official proceedings. And, whereas, the matter has been thoroughly investigated by the State Historical Society and the Eclectic Society of Little Rock, which have agreed upon the correct pronunciation as derived from history, and the early usage of the American immigrants. Be it therefore resolved by both houses of the General Assembly, that the only true pronunciation of the name of the state, in the opinion of this body, is that received by the French from the Native Americans and committed to writing in the French word representing the sound. It should be pronounced in three (3) syllables, with the final "s" silent, the "a" in each syllable with the Italian sound, and the accent on the first and last syllables. The pronunciation with the accent on the second syllable with the sound of "a" in "man" and the sounding of the terminal "s" is an innovation to be discouraged. Citizens of the State of Kansas often pronounce the Arkansas River /ɑːrˈkænzəs/ in a manner similar to the common pronunciation of the name of their state.)
**Arkansas**; Statehood in 1836	**Little Rock**	1821	Capitals of the Arkansaw Territory.
**Arkansas**; Statehood in 1836	**Little Rock**	**1836**	**Capital of the State of Arkansas**. (Washington was the Confederate state capital 1863–1865.)
**California**; Statehood in 1850	Loreto (BCS)	1770	Capitals of the Spanish Virreinato de la Nueva España colonies of las Californias.
**California**; Statehood in 1850	Presidio Reál de San Carlos de Monterey Monterey	1777	Capitals of the Spanish Virreinato de la Nueva España colonies of las Californias.
**California**; Statehood in 1850	Presidio Reál de San Carlos de Monterey Monterey	1804	Capital of the Spanish Virreinato de la Nueva España province of Alta California.
**California**; Statehood in 1850	Presidio Reál de San Carlos de Monterey Monterey	1821	Capital of the Mexican province of Alta California.
**California**; Statehood in 1850	Presidio Reál de San Carlos de Monterey Monterey	1846	Capital of the U.S. military government of California.
**California**; Statehood in 1850	Presidio Reál de San Carlos de Monterey Monterey	1849	Capital of the Provisional Government of California.
**California**; Statehood in 1850	Pueblo de San José de Guadalupe	**1850**	**Capitals of the State of California**.
**California**; Statehood in 1850	Vallejo	1852	**Capitals of the State of California**.
**California**; Statehood in 1850	Benicia	1853	**Capitals of the State of California**.
**California**; Statehood in 1850	**Sacramento** (Note: Due to flooding in Sacramento, San Francisco served as a temporary capital from January 24, 1862 to May 15, 1862. See "California's State Capitols 1850–present" (PDF). Archived from the original (PDF) on August 19, 2010.)	1854	**Capitals of the State of California**.
**Colorado**; Statehood in 1876	Denver City (Note: From December 3, 1859, to December 3, 1861, Denver City was formally the City of Denver, Auraria, and Highland.)	1859	Capitals of the extralegal Territory of Jefferson.
**Colorado**; Statehood in 1876	Golden City	1860	Capitals of the extralegal Territory of Jefferson.
**Colorado**; Statehood in 1876	Denver City	1861	Capitals of the Territory of Colorado.
**Colorado**; Statehood in 1876	Colorado City	1862	Capitals of the Territory of Colorado.
**Colorado**; Statehood in 1876	Golden City	1862	Capitals of the Territory of Colorado.
**Colorado**; Statehood in 1876	**Denver** (Note: On November 15, 1902, the City of Denver became the City and County of Denver.)	1867	Capitals of the Territory of Colorado.
**Colorado**; Statehood in 1876	**Denver**	**1876**	**Capital of the State of Colorado**.
**Connecticut**; Statehood in 1776	Fort Amsterdam (NY)	1625	Capital of the Dutch colony of Nieuw-Nederland.
**Connecticut**; Statehood in 1776	Hartford	1639	Capital of the English Colony of Connecticut 1639–1686.
**Connecticut**; Statehood in 1776	New-Haven	1640	Capital of the English Colony of New-Haven until its merger into the Connecticut Colony in 1662.
**Connecticut**; Statehood in 1776	Boston (MA)	1686	Capital of the English Dominion of New-England in America.
**Connecticut**; Statehood in 1776	Hartford	1689	Capital of the English Colony of Connecticut.
**Connecticut**; Statehood in 1776	joint capitals	1701	Hartford and New-Haven served as the "co-capitals" of the English Colony of Connecticut, with the Assembly holding its May session in Hartford and its October session in New-Haven.
**Connecticut**; Statehood in 1776	joint capitals	1707	Hartford and New-Haven joint capitals of the British Colony of Connecticut.
**Connecticut**; Statehood in 1776	joint capitals	**1776**	Hartford and New Haven joint capitals of the State of Connecticut.
**Connecticut**; Statehood in 1776	**Hartford**	1875	**Capital of the State of Connecticut**.
**Delaware**; Statehood in 1776	Fort Christina	1638	Capital of the Swedish colony of Nya Sverige.
**Delaware**; Statehood in 1776	Fort Amsterdam; Nieuw-Amsterdam; New-York; Nieuw-Oranje; New-York (NY)	1655	Capital of the Dutch province of Nieuw-Nederland.
**Delaware**; Statehood in 1776	Fort Amsterdam; Nieuw-Amsterdam; New-York; Nieuw-Oranje; New-York (NY)	1664	Capital of the English Colony of New-York.
**Delaware**; Statehood in 1776	Fort Amsterdam; Nieuw-Amsterdam; New-York; Nieuw-Oranje; New-York (NY)	1673	Capital of the Dutch military government of Nieuw-Nederland.
**Delaware**; Statehood in 1776	Fort Amsterdam; Nieuw-Amsterdam; New-York; Nieuw-Oranje; New-York (NY)	1674	Capital of the English Colony of New-York.
**Delaware**; Statehood in 1776	Philadelphia (PA)	1682	Capital of the English Colony of Pennsylvania.
**Delaware**; Statehood in 1776	New Castle	1704	Capital of the English Lower Counties on the Delaware.
**Delaware**; Statehood in 1776	New Castle	1707	Capital of the British Lower Counties on the Delaware.
**Delaware**; Statehood in 1776	New Castle	**1776**	**Capitals of the State of Delaware**.
**Delaware**; Statehood in 1776	**Dover**	1777	**Capitals of the State of Delaware**.
**Florida**; Statehood in 1845	Fort de la Caroline	1564	Capital of the French colony of La Caroline 1564–1565.
**Florida**; Statehood in 1845	San Agustín; St. Augustine	1565	Capital of the Spanish province of La Florida 1565–1763.
**Florida**; Statehood in 1845	San Agustín; St. Augustine	1763	Capital of the British province of East Florida 1763–1783.
**Florida**; Statehood in 1845	San Agustín; St. Augustine	1783	Capital of the Spanish province of Florida Oriental 1783–1821.
**Florida**; Statehood in 1845	Santa María de Ochuse; Pensacola	1763	Capital of the British province of British West Florida 1763–1783.
**Florida**; Statehood in 1845	Santa María de Ochuse; Pensacola	1783	Capital of the Spanish province of Florida Occidental 1783–1821.
**Florida**; Statehood in 1845	**Tallahassee**	1824	Capital of the Florida Territory.
**Florida**; Statehood in 1845	**Tallahassee**	**1845**	**Capital of the State of Florida**.
**Georgia**; Statehood in 1776	Fort de la Caroline	1564	Capital of the French colony of La Caroline 1564–1565.
**Georgia**; Statehood in 1776	San Agustín (FL)	1565	Capital of the Spanish province of La Florida.
**Georgia**; Statehood in 1776	Savannah	1733	Capital of the British proprietary Colony of Georgia.
**Georgia**; Statehood in 1776	Savannah	1755	Capital of the British Province of Georgia.
**Georgia**; Statehood in 1776	Savannah	**1776**	**Capitals of the State of Georgia**.
**Georgia**; Statehood in 1776	Augusta	1778	**Capitals of the State of Georgia**.
**Georgia**; Statehood in 1776	Heard's Fort	1780	**Capitals of the State of Georgia**.
**Georgia**; Statehood in 1776	Augusta	1781	**Capitals of the State of Georgia**.
**Georgia**; Statehood in 1776	Savannah	1782	**Capitals of the State of Georgia**.
**Georgia**; Statehood in 1776	Ebenezer	1782	**Capitals of the State of Georgia**.
**Georgia**; Statehood in 1776	Savannah	1784	**Capitals of the State of Georgia**.
**Georgia**; Statehood in 1776	Augusta	1786	**Capitals of the State of Georgia**.
**Georgia**; Statehood in 1776	Louisville	1796	**Capitals of the State of Georgia**.
**Georgia**; Statehood in 1776	Milledgeville	1807	**Capitals of the State of Georgia**.
**Georgia**; Statehood in 1776	Macon	1864	**Capitals of the State of Georgia**.
**Georgia**; Statehood in 1776	Milledgeville	1865	**Capitals of the State of Georgia**.
**Georgia**; Statehood in 1776	**Atlanta**	1868	**Capitals of the State of Georgia**.
**Hawaii**; Statehood in 1959	Lahaina	1820	Capitals of the Kingdom of Hawaii.
**Hawaii**; Statehood in 1959	**Honolulu**	1845	Capitals of the Kingdom of Hawaii.
**Hawaii**; Statehood in 1959	**Honolulu**	1894	Capital of the Republic of Hawaii.
**Hawaii**; Statehood in 1959	**Honolulu**	1898	Capital of the Territory of Hawaii.
**Hawaii**; Statehood in 1959	**Honolulu**	**1959**	**Capital of the State of Hawaiʻi**.
**Idaho**; Statehood in 1890	Oregon City (OR)	1843	Capital of the Provisional Government of Oregon in the Oregon Country.
**Idaho**; Statehood in 1890	Oregon City (OR)	1848	Capitals of the Territory of Oregon (all of Idaho 1848–1853, southern Idaho 1853–1859).
**Idaho**; Statehood in 1890	Salem (OR)	1851	Capitals of the Territory of Oregon (all of Idaho 1848–1853, southern Idaho 1853–1859).
**Idaho**; Statehood in 1890	Olympia (WA)	1853	Capital of the Territory of Washington (northern Idaho 1853–1859, all of Idaho 1859–1863).
**Idaho**; Statehood in 1890	Lewiston	1863	Capitals of the Territory of Idaho.
**Idaho**; Statehood in 1890	**Boise**	1865	Capitals of the Territory of Idaho.
**Idaho**; Statehood in 1890	**Boise**	**1890**	**Capital of the State of Idaho**.
**Illinois**; Statehood in 1818	Marietta (OH)	1788	Capital of the Territory Northwest of the River Ohio.
**Illinois**; Statehood in 1818	Vincennes (IN)	1800	Capital of the Territory of Indiana.
**Illinois**; Statehood in 1818	Kaskaskia	1809	Capital of the Territory of Illinois.
**Illinois**; Statehood in 1818	Kaskaskia	**1818**	**Capitals of the State of Illinois**.
**Illinois**; Statehood in 1818	Vandalia	1820	**Capitals of the State of Illinois**.
**Illinois**; Statehood in 1818	**Springfield**	1839	**Capitals of the State of Illinois**.
**Indiana**; Statehood in 1816	Marietta (OH)	1788	Capital of the Territory Northwest of the River Ohio.
**Indiana**; Statehood in 1816	Vincennes	1800	Capitals of the Territory of Indiana.
**Indiana**; Statehood in 1816	Corydon	1813	Capitals of the Territory of Indiana.
**Indiana**; Statehood in 1816	Corydon	**1816**	**Capitals of the State of Indiana**.
**Indiana**; Statehood in 1816	**Indianapolis**	1825	**Capitals of the State of Indiana**.
**Iowa**; Statehood in 1846	Saint-Louis; San Luis; St. Louis (MO)	1765	Capital of the Spanish (though predominantly Francophone) district of Alta Louisiana.
**Iowa**; Statehood in 1846	Saint-Louis; San Luis; St. Louis (MO)	1800	Capital of the French district of La Haute-Louisiane.
**Iowa**; Statehood in 1846	Saint-Louis; San Luis; St. Louis (MO)	1804	Capital of the District of Louisiana (under the authority of the Indiana Territory).
**Iowa**; Statehood in 1846	Saint-Louis; San Luis; St. Louis (MO)	1805	Capital of the Louisiana Territory.
**Iowa**; Statehood in 1846	Saint-Louis; San Luis; St. Louis (MO)	1812	Capital of the Missouri Territory (1812–1821).
**Iowa**; Statehood in 1846	Detroit (MI)	1834	Capital of the Territory of Michigan.
**Iowa**; Statehood in 1846	Belmont (WI)	1836	Capitals of the Territory of Wisconsin.
**Iowa**; Statehood in 1846	Burlington	1837	Capitals of the Territory of Wisconsin.
**Iowa**; Statehood in 1846	Burlington	1838	Capitals of the Territory of Iowa.
**Iowa**; Statehood in 1846	Iowa City	1841	Capitals of the Territory of Iowa.
**Iowa**; Statehood in 1846	Iowa City	**1846**	**Capitals of the State of Iowa**.
**Iowa**; Statehood in 1846	**Des Moines**	1857	**Capitals of the State of Iowa**.
**Kansas**; Statehood in 1861	Saint-Louis; San Luis; St. Louis (MO)	1765	Capital of the Spanish (though predominantly Francophone) district of Alta Louisiana.
**Kansas**; Statehood in 1861	Saint-Louis; San Luis; St. Louis (MO)	1800	Capital of the French district of La Haute-Louisiane.
**Kansas**; Statehood in 1861	Saint-Louis; San Luis; St. Louis (MO)	1804	Capital of the District of Louisiana (under the authority of the Indiana Territory).
**Kansas**; Statehood in 1861	Saint-Louis; San Luis; St. Louis (MO)	1805	Capital of the Louisiana Territory.
**Kansas**; Statehood in 1861	Saint-Louis; San Luis; St. Louis (MO)	1812	Capital of the Missouri Territory (1812–1821).
**Kansas**; Statehood in 1861	Pawnee	1855	Capital of the Kansas Territory (July 2 – 6).
**Kansas**; Statehood in 1861	Shawnee Mission	1855	Capital of the Kansas Territory.
**Kansas**; Statehood in 1861	Lecompton	1856	Capital de jure (pro-slavery) of the Territory of Kansas.
**Kansas**; Statehood in 1861	Topeka	1856	Capital de facto (anti-slavery) of the Territory of Kansas.
**Kansas**; Statehood in 1861	Minneola	1858	Declared capital by territorial legislature, although this action was later declared void.
**Kansas**; Statehood in 1861	**Topeka**	**1861**	**Capital of the State of Kansas**.
**Kentucky**; Statehood in 1792	Williamsburg (VA)	1699	Capital of the English Colony of Virginia.
**Kentucky**; Statehood in 1792	Williamsburg (VA)	1707	Capital of the British Colony of Virginia.
**Kentucky**; Statehood in 1792	Williamsburg (VA)	1776	Capital of the Commonwealth of Virginia.
**Kentucky**; Statehood in 1792	Richmond (VA)	1780	Capital of the Commonwealth of Virginia.
**Kentucky**; Statehood in 1792	**Frankfort**	**1792**	**Capital of the Commonwealth of Kentucky**. (The government initially met at Lexington but Frankfort was quickly named the capital. Bowling Green was the rival Confederate state capital 1861–62).
**Louisiana** (Note: Note: The Louisiana Capitals information may be incorrect or incomplete. See "Louisiana History". Archived from the original on June 15, 2006. and elsewhere.); Statehood in 1812	San Agustín (FL)	1565	Capital of the Spanish province of La Florida.
**Louisiana**; Statehood in 1812	La Mobile (AL)	1702	Capitals of the French colony of La Louisiane.
**Louisiana**; Statehood in 1812	Bilocci (MS)	1720	Capitals of the French colony of La Louisiane.
**Louisiana**; Statehood in 1812	La Nouvelle-Orléans; Nueva Orleans; New Orleans	1722	Capitals of the French colony of La Louisiane.
**Louisiana**; Statehood in 1812	La Nouvelle-Orléans; Nueva Orleans; New Orleans	1763	Capital of the Spanish district of Baja Louisiana.
**Louisiana**; Statehood in 1812	La Nouvelle-Orléans; Nueva Orleans; New Orleans	1800	Capital of the French district of La Basse-Louisiane.
**Louisiana**; Statehood in 1812	La Nouvelle-Orléans; Nueva Orleans; New Orleans	1804	Capital of the Territory of Orleans.
**Louisiana**; Statehood in 1812	La Nouvelle-Orléans; Nueva Orleans; New Orleans	**1812**	**Capitals of the State of Louisiana**. (After the Union captured New Orleans in 1862, the Confederate seat of government relocated to Opelousas in 1862 and then to Shreveport in 1863.)
**Louisiana**; Statehood in 1812	Donaldsonville	1830	**Capitals of the State of Louisiana**. (After the Union captured New Orleans in 1862, the Confederate seat of government relocated to Opelousas in 1862 and then to Shreveport in 1863.)
**Louisiana**; Statehood in 1812	New Orleans	1831	**Capitals of the State of Louisiana**. (After the Union captured New Orleans in 1862, the Confederate seat of government relocated to Opelousas in 1862 and then to Shreveport in 1863.)
**Louisiana**; Statehood in 1812	Baton Rouge	1849	**Capitals of the State of Louisiana**. (After the Union captured New Orleans in 1862, the Confederate seat of government relocated to Opelousas in 1862 and then to Shreveport in 1863.)
**Louisiana**; Statehood in 1812	New Orleans	1864	**Capitals of the State of Louisiana**. (After the Union captured New Orleans in 1862, the Confederate seat of government relocated to Opelousas in 1862 and then to Shreveport in 1863.)
**Louisiana**; Statehood in 1812	**Baton Rouge**	1882	**Capitals of the State of Louisiana**. (After the Union captured New Orleans in 1862, the Confederate seat of government relocated to Opelousas in 1862 and then to Shreveport in 1863.)
**Maine**; Statehood in 1820	Île Sainte-Croix	1604	Capitals of the French colony of l'Acadie.
**Maine**; Statehood in 1820	Port-Royal (NS)	1605	Capitals of the French colony of l'Acadie.
**Maine**; Statehood in 1820	Boston (MA)	1630	Capital of the English Colony of Massachusetts Bay.
**Maine**; Statehood in 1820	Boston (MA)	1686	Capital of the English Dominion of New-England in America.
**Maine**; Statehood in 1820	Boston (MA)	1689	Capital of the dissident Colony of Massachusetts Bay.
**Maine**; Statehood in 1820	Boston (MA)	1691	Capital of the English Province of Massachusetts Bay.
**Maine**; Statehood in 1820	Boston (MA)	1707	Capital of the British Province of Massachusetts Bay.
**Maine**; Statehood in 1820	Boston (MA)	1774	Capital of the dissident Province of Massachusetts Bay.
**Maine**; Statehood in 1820	Boston (MA)	1776	Capital of the State of Massachusetts Bay.
**Maine**; Statehood in 1820	Boston (MA)	1780	Capital of the Commonwealth of Massachusetts.
**Maine**; Statehood in 1820	Portland	**1820**	Capital of the State of Maine.
**Maine**; Statehood in 1820	Portland	1827	Capital de facto of the State of Maine.
**Maine**; Statehood in 1820	**Augusta**	1827	Capital de jure of the State of Maine.
**Maine**; Statehood in 1820	**Augusta**	1832	**Capital of the State of Maine**.
**Maryland**; Statehood in 1776	St. Mary's City	1634	Capital of the English proprietary Colony of Maryland.
**Maryland**; Statehood in 1776	Anne Arundel's Towne; **Annapolis**	1694	Capital of the English Province of Maryland.
**Maryland**; Statehood in 1776	Anne Arundel's Towne; **Annapolis**	1707	Capital of the British Province of Maryland.
**Maryland**; Statehood in 1776	Anne Arundel's Towne; **Annapolis**	**1776**	**Capital of the State of Maryland**. (Capital of the United States of America 1783–1784.)
**Massachusetts**; Statehood in 1776	Plimouth	1620	Capital of the English Colony of New-Plimouth 1620–1686.
**Massachusetts**; Statehood in 1776	Boston	1630	Capital of the English Colony of Massachusetts Bay 1630–1686.
**Massachusetts**; Statehood in 1776	Boston	1686	Capital of the English Dominion of New-England in America 1686–1689.
**Massachusetts**; Statehood in 1776	Plimouth	1688	Capital of the dissident Colony of New-Plimouth 1688–1692.
**Massachusetts**; Statehood in 1776	**Boston**	1689	Capital of the dissident Colony of Massachusetts Bay 1689–1692.
**Massachusetts**; Statehood in 1776	**Boston**	1692	Capital of the English Province of Massachusetts Bay.
**Massachusetts**; Statehood in 1776	**Boston**	1707	Capital of the British Province of Massachusetts Bay.
**Massachusetts**; Statehood in 1776	**Boston**	1774	Capital of the dissident Province of Massachusetts Bay.
**Massachusetts**; Statehood in 1776	**Boston**	**1776**	Capital of the State of Massachusetts Bay.
**Massachusetts**; Statehood in 1776	**Boston**	1780	**Capital of the Commonwealth of Massachusetts**.
**Michigan**; Statehood in 1837	Marietta (OH)	1788	Capitals of the Territory Northwest of the River Ohio (all of Michigan 1788–1800, eastern Michigan 1800–1803).
**Michigan**; Statehood in 1837	Chillicothe (OH)	1800	Capitals of the Territory Northwest of the River Ohio (all of Michigan 1788–1800, eastern Michigan 1800–1803).
**Michigan**; Statehood in 1837	Vincennes (IN)	1800	Capitals of the Territory of Indiana (western Michigan 1800–1803; all of Michigan 1803–1805, a portion of the Upper Peninsula 1805–1816).
**Michigan**; Statehood in 1837	Corydon (IN)	1813	Capitals of the Territory of Indiana (western Michigan 1800–1803; all of Michigan 1803–1805, a portion of the Upper Peninsula 1805–1816).
**Michigan**; Statehood in 1837	Detroit	1805	Capital of the Territory of Michigan (Lower Peninsula 1805–1818, all of Michigan 1818–1837). (Detroit was occupied by British Armed Forces 1812–1813).
**Michigan**; Statehood in 1837	Detroit	**1837**	**Capitals of the State of Michigan**.
**Michigan**; Statehood in 1837	**Lansing**	1847	**Capitals of the State of Michigan**.
**Minnesota**; Statehood in 1858	Saint-Louis; San Luis; St. Louis (MO)	1765	Capital of the Spanish (though predominantly Francophone) district of Alta Louisiana 1765–1800.
**Minnesota**; Statehood in 1858	Saint-Louis; San Luis; St. Louis (MO)	1800	Capital of the French district of la Haute-Louisiane (west of Mississippi River 1800–1804).
**Minnesota**; Statehood in 1858	Saint-Louis; San Luis; St. Louis (MO)	1804	Capital of the District of Louisiana (west of Mississippi River under the authority of the Indiana Territory 1804–1805).
**Minnesota**; Statehood in 1858	Saint-Louis; San Luis; St. Louis (MO)	1805	Capital of the Territory of Louisiana (west of Mississippi River 1805–1812).
**Minnesota**; Statehood in 1858	Saint-Louis; San Luis; St. Louis (MO)	1812	Capital of the Territory of Missouri (west of Mississippi River 1812–1821).
**Minnesota**; Statehood in 1858	Marietta (OH)	1788	Capital of the Territory Northwest of the River Ohio (east of Mississippi River 1788–1800).
**Minnesota**; Statehood in 1858	Vincennes (IN)	1800	Capital of the Territory of Indiana (east of Mississippi River 1800–1809).
**Minnesota**; Statehood in 1858	Kaskaskia (IL)	1809	Capital of the Territory of Illinois (east of Mississippi River 1809–1818).
**Minnesota**; Statehood in 1858	Detroit (MI)	1818	Capital of the Territory of Michigan (east of Mississippi River 1818–1834, all of Minnesota 1834–1836).
**Minnesota**; Statehood in 1858	Belmont (WI)	1836	Capitals of the Territory of Wisconsin.
**Minnesota**; Statehood in 1858	Burlington (IA)	1837	Capitals of the Territory of Wisconsin.
**Minnesota**; Statehood in 1858	Burlington (IA)	1838	Capital of the Territory of Iowa (west of Mississippi River 1838–1841).
**Minnesota**; Statehood in 1858	Madison (WI)	1838	Capital of the Territory of Wisconsin (east of Mississippi River 1838–1848).
**Minnesota**; Statehood in 1858	Iowa City (IA)	1841	Capital of the Territory of Iowa (west of Mississippi River 1841–1846).
**Minnesota**; Statehood in 1858	**Saint Paul**	1849	Capital of the Territory of Minnesota.
**Minnesota**; Statehood in 1858	**Saint Paul**	**1858**	**Capital of the State of Minnesota**.
**Mississippi**; Statehood in 1817	San Agustín (FL)	1565	Capital of the Spanish province of La Florida.
**Mississippi**; Statehood in 1817	Savannah (GA)	1733	Capital of the British proprietary Colony of Georgia.
**Mississippi**; Statehood in 1817	Savannah (GA)	1755	Capital of the British Province of Georgia.
**Mississippi**; Statehood in 1817	Savannah (GA)	1776	Capitals of the State of Georgia.
**Mississippi**; Statehood in 1817	Augusta (GA)	1778	Capitals of the State of Georgia.
**Mississippi**; Statehood in 1817	Heard's Fort (GA)	1780	Capitals of the State of Georgia.
**Mississippi**; Statehood in 1817	Augusta (GA)	1781	Capitals of the State of Georgia.
**Mississippi**; Statehood in 1817	Savannah (GA)	1782	Capitals of the State of Georgia.
**Mississippi**; Statehood in 1817	Ebenezer (GA)	1782	Capitals of the State of Georgia.
**Mississippi**; Statehood in 1817	Savannah (GA)	1784	Capitals of the State of Georgia.
**Mississippi**; Statehood in 1817	Augusta (GA)	1786	Capitals of the State of Georgia.
**Mississippi**; Statehood in 1817	Louisville (GA)	1796	Capitals of the State of Georgia.
**Mississippi**; Statehood in 1817	Natchez	1798	Capitals of the Territory of Mississippi.
**Mississippi**; Statehood in 1817	Washington	1802	Capitals of the Territory of Mississippi.
**Mississippi**; Statehood in 1817	Natchez	**1817**	**Capitals of the State of Mississippi**.
**Mississippi**; Statehood in 1817	**Jackson**	1821	**Capitals of the State of Mississippi**.
**Missouri**; Statehood in 1821	Saint-Louis; San Luis; St. Louis	1765	Capital of the Spanish (though predominantly Francophone) district of Alta Louisiana.
**Missouri**; Statehood in 1821	Saint-Louis; San Luis; St. Louis	1800	Capital of the French district of La Haute-Louisiane.
**Missouri**; Statehood in 1821	Saint-Louis; San Luis; St. Louis	1804	Capital of the District of Louisiana (under the authority of the Indiana Territory).
**Missouri**; Statehood in 1821	Saint-Louis; San Luis; St. Louis	1805	Capital of the Louisiana Territory.
**Missouri**; Statehood in 1821	Saint-Louis; San Luis; St. Louis	1812	Capital of the Missouri Territory.
**Missouri**; Statehood in 1821	Saint Charles	**1821**	**Capitals of the State of Missouri**. (A Confederate state government in exile operated from Neosho 1861–1863, and from Marshall, Texas, 1863–1865).
**Missouri**; Statehood in 1821	**Jefferson City**	1826	**Capitals of the State of Missouri**. (A Confederate state government in exile operated from Neosho 1861–1863, and from Marshall, Texas, 1863–1865).
**Montana**; Statehood in 1889	Saint-Louis; San Luis; St. Louis (MO)	1765	Capital of the Spanish (though predominantly Francophone) district of Alta Louisiana (east of Continental Divide 1763–1800.)
**Montana**; Statehood in 1889	Saint-Louis; San Luis; St. Louis (MO)	1800	Capital of the French district of la Haute-Louisiane (east of Continental Divide 1800–1804).
**Montana**; Statehood in 1889	Saint-Louis; San Luis; St. Louis (MO)	1804	Capital of the District of Louisiana (east of Continental Divide under the authority of the Indiana Territory 1804–1805).
**Montana**; Statehood in 1889	Saint-Louis; San Luis; St. Louis (MO)	1805	Capital of the Territory of Louisiana (east of Continental Divide 1805–1812).
**Montana**; Statehood in 1889	Saint-Louis; San Luis; St. Louis (MO)	1812	Capital of the Territory of Missouri (east of Continental Divide 1812–1821).
**Montana**; Statehood in 1889	Fort Vancouver (WA)	1825	Capital de facto of the Oregon Country (west of Continental Divide 1818–1843).
**Montana**; Statehood in 1889	Oregon City (OR)	1843	Capital of the Provisional Government of Oregon (west of Continental Divide 1843–1848).
**Montana**; Statehood in 1889	Oregon City (OR)	1848	Capitals of the Territory of Oregon (west of Continental Divide 1848–1853).
**Montana**; Statehood in 1889	Salem (OR)	1851	Capitals of the Territory of Oregon (west of Continental Divide 1848–1853).
**Montana**; Statehood in 1889	Olympia (WA)	1853	Capital of the Territory of Washington (west of Continental Divide 1853–1863).
**Montana**; Statehood in 1889	Omaha (NE)	1854	Capital of the Territory of Nebraska (east of Continental Divide 1854–1861).
**Montana**; Statehood in 1889	Yankton (SD)	1861	Capital of the Territory of Dakota (east of Continental Divide 1861–1863).
**Montana**; Statehood in 1889	Lewiston (ID)	1863	Capital of the Territory of Idaho.
**Montana**; Statehood in 1889	Bannack	1864	Capitals of the Territory of Montana.
**Montana**; Statehood in 1889	Virginia City	1865	Capitals of the Territory of Montana.
**Montana**; Statehood in 1889	**Helena**	1875	Capitals of the Territory of Montana.
**Montana**; Statehood in 1889	**Helena**	**1889**	**Capital of the State of Montana**.
**Nebraska**; Statehood in 1867	Saint-Louis; San Luis; St. Louis (MO)	1765	Capital of the Spanish (though predominantly Francophone) district of Alta Louisiana.
**Nebraska**; Statehood in 1867	Saint-Louis; San Luis; St. Louis (MO)	1800	Capital of the French district of la Haute-Louisiane.
**Nebraska**; Statehood in 1867	Saint-Louis; San Luis; St. Louis (MO)	1804	Capital of the District of Louisiana (under the authority of the Indiana Territory).
**Nebraska**; Statehood in 1867	Saint-Louis; San Luis; St. Louis (MO)	1805	Capital of the Territory of Louisiana.
**Nebraska**; Statehood in 1867	Saint-Louis; San Luis; St. Louis (MO)	1812	Capital of the Territory of Missouri (1812–1821).
**Nebraska**; Statehood in 1867	Omaha	1854	Capitals of the Territory of Nebraska.
**Nebraska**; Statehood in 1867	Lancaster; **Lincoln**	1867	Capitals of the Territory of Nebraska.
**Nebraska**; Statehood in 1867	Lancaster; **Lincoln**	**1867**	**Capital of the State of Nebraska**.
**Nevada**; Statehood in 1864	Fillmore (UT)	1850	Capitals of the Territory of Utah.
**Nevada**; Statehood in 1864	Salt Lake City (UT)	1858	Capitals of the Territory of Utah.
**Nevada**; Statehood in 1864	**Genoa**	1861	Capital of the Territory of Nevada.
**Nevada**; Statehood in 1864	**Carson City**	1861	Capital of the Territory of Nevada.
**Nevada**; Statehood in 1864	**Carson City**	**1864**	**Capital of the State of Nevada**.
**New Hampshire**; Statehood in 1776	Boston (MA)	1630	Capital of the English Colony of Massachusetts Bay.
**New Hampshire**; Statehood in 1776	Portsmouth	1680	Capital of the English Province of New Hampshire.
**New Hampshire**; Statehood in 1776	Boston (MA)	1686	Capital of the English Dominion of New-England in America.
**New Hampshire**; Statehood in 1776	Portsmouth	1689	Capital of the dissident Province of New Hampshire.
**New Hampshire**; Statehood in 1776	Portsmouth	1691	Capital of the English Province of New Hampshire.
**New Hampshire**; Statehood in 1776	Portsmouth	1698	Capital of the English Province of New Hampshire under jurisdiction of the Royal Governor of the Province of Massachusetts Bay.
**New Hampshire**; Statehood in 1776	Portsmouth	1707	Capital of the British Province of New Hampshire under jurisdiction of the Royal Governor of the Province of Massachusetts Bay.
**New Hampshire**; Statehood in 1776	Portsmouth	1741	Capital of the British Province of New Hampshire.
**New Hampshire**; Statehood in 1776	Exeter	1775	Capital of the Revolutionary War government of New Hampshire.
**New Hampshire**; Statehood in 1776	Exeter	**1776**	**Capitals of the State of New Hampshire**.
**New Hampshire**; Statehood in 1776	**Concord**	1808	**Capitals of the State of New Hampshire**.
**New Jersey**; Statehood in 1776	Fort Amsterdam (NY) New-York (NY)	1625	Capital of the Dutch colony of Nieuw-Nederland.
**New Jersey**; Statehood in 1776	Fort Amsterdam (NY) New-York (NY)	1652	Capital of the Dutch province of Nieuw-Nederland.
**New Jersey**; Statehood in 1776	Fort Amsterdam (NY) New-York (NY)	1664	Capital of the English Province of New York.
**New Jersey**; Statehood in 1776	Elizabethtown (now Elizabeth)	1665	Capital of the English Province of New Jersey.
**New Jersey**; Statehood in 1776	Perth Amboy	1673	Capital of the English Province of East Jersey 1673–1688.
**New Jersey**; Statehood in 1776	Burlington	1673	Capital of the English Province of West Jersey 1673–1688.
**New Jersey**; Statehood in 1776	Boston (MA)	1688	Capital of the English Dominion of New-England in America 1688–1689.
**New Jersey**; Statehood in 1776	Perth Amboy	1689	Capital of the English Province of East Jersey 1689–1702.
**New Jersey**; Statehood in 1776	Burlington	1689	Capital of the English Province of West Jersey 1689–1702.
**New Jersey**; Statehood in 1776	joint capitals	1702	East Jersey and West Jersey were re-united as the English Province of New Jersey in 1702. Perth Amboy and Burlington served jointly as the capital until 1784.
**New Jersey**; Statehood in 1776	joint capitals	1707	Joint capitals of the British Province of New Jersey.
**New Jersey**; Statehood in 1776	joint capitals	**1776**	Joint capitals of the State of New Jersey.
**New Jersey**; Statehood in 1776	**Trenton**	1784	**Capital of the State of New Jersey**. (Capital of the United States of America in 1784).
**New Mexico**; Statehood in 1912	San Juan de los Caballeros	1598	Capitals of the Spanish Virreinato de la Nueva España province of Santa Fe de Nuevo México.
**New Mexico**; Statehood in 1912	La Villa Real de la Santa Fe de San Francisco de Asís	1610	Capitals of the Spanish Virreinato de la Nueva España province of Santa Fe de Nuevo México.
**New Mexico**; Statehood in 1912	Taos Pueblo	1680	Capital of the Pueblo Republic (1680-1692).
**New Mexico**; Statehood in 1912	El Paso del Norte (now Ciudad Juárez, Mexico)	1680	Capital of the Spanish Virreinato de la Nueva España province-in-exile of Santa Fe de Nuevo México (Pueblo Revolt 1680–1692).
**New Mexico**; Statehood in 1912	La Villa Real de la Santa Fé de San Francisco de Asís	1692	Capital of the Spanish Virreinato de la Nueva España province of Santa Fe de Nuevo México.
**New Mexico**; Statehood in 1912	La Villa Real de la Santa Fé de San Francisco de Asís	1821	Capital of the First Mexican Empire province of Santa Fe de Nuevo México.
**New Mexico**; Statehood in 1912	La Villa Real de la Santa Fé de San Francisco de Asís	1824	Capital of the First Mexican Republic territory of Santa Fe de Nuevo México.
**New Mexico**; Statehood in 1912	La Villa Real de la Santa Fé de San Francisco de Asís	1835	Capital of the Centralist Republic of Mexico department of Santa Fe de Nuevo México.
**New Mexico**; Statehood in 1912	Taos Pueblo	1837	Capital of New Mexico during the Rio Arriba Rebellion against the Centralist Republic of Mexico.
**New Mexico**; Statehood in 1912	La Villa Real de la Santa Fé de San Francisco de Asís **Santa Fe**	1837	Capital of the Centralist Republic of Mexico department of Santa Fe de Nuevo México.
**New Mexico**; Statehood in 1912	La Villa Real de la Santa Fé de San Francisco de Asís **Santa Fe**	1846	Capital of the Second Federal Republic of Mexico territory of Santa Fe de Nuevo México.
**New Mexico**; Statehood in 1912	La Villa Real de la Santa Fé de San Francisco de Asís **Santa Fe**	1846	Capital of the U.S. military government of New Mexico 1846.
**New Mexico**; Statehood in 1912	La Villa Real de la Santa Fé de San Francisco de Asís **Santa Fe**	1846	Capital of the U.S. provisional government of New Mexico 1846–1850.
**New Mexico**; Statehood in 1912	La Villa Real de la Santa Fé de San Francisco de Asís **Santa Fe**	1850	Capital of the U.S. Territory of New Mexico 1850–1912.
**New Mexico**; Statehood in 1912	La Villa Real de la Santa Fé de San Francisco de Asís **Santa Fe**	**1912**	**Capital of the State of New Mexico**.
**New York**; Statehood in 1776	Fort Amsterdam; Nieuw-Amsterdam; New-York; Nieuw-Oranje; New-York	1625	Capital of the Dutch colony of Nieuw-Nederland (Novum Belgium).
**New York**; Statehood in 1776	Fort Amsterdam; Nieuw-Amsterdam; New-York; Nieuw-Oranje; New-York	1652	Capital of the Dutch province of Nieuw-Nederland.
**New York**; Statehood in 1776	Fort Amsterdam; Nieuw-Amsterdam; New-York; Nieuw-Oranje; New-York	1664	Capital of the English Province of New York.
**New York**; Statehood in 1776	Fort Amsterdam; Nieuw-Amsterdam; New-York; Nieuw-Oranje; New-York	1673	Capital of the Dutch military government of Nieuw-Nederland.
**New York**; Statehood in 1776	Fort Amsterdam; Nieuw-Amsterdam; New-York; Nieuw-Oranje; New-York	1674	Capital of the English Province of New York.
**New York**; Statehood in 1776	Boston (MA)	1688	Capital of the English Dominion of New-England in America.
**New York**; Statehood in 1776	New-York	1689	Capital of the dissident government of New-York.
**New York**; Statehood in 1776	New-York	1691	Capital of the English Province of New York.
**New York**; Statehood in 1776	New-York	1707	Capital of the British Province of New York.
**New York**; Statehood in 1776	New-York	**1776**	Capitals of the State of New York.
**New York**; Statehood in 1776	Kingston	1777	Capitals of the State of New York.
**New York**; Statehood in 1776	Hurley	1777	Capitals of the State of New York.
**New York**; Statehood in 1776	Poughkeepsie	1777	Capitals of the State of New York.
**New York**; Statehood in 1776	New York	1788	Capital of the State of New York. (Capital of the United States of America 1785–1788 and 1789–1790).
**New York**; Statehood in 1776	**Albany**	1797	**Capital of the State of New York**.
**North Carolina**; Statehood in 1776	San Agustín (FL)	1565	Capital of the Spanish province of La Florida.
**North Carolina**; Statehood in 1776	Charlestown (SC) (Note: The modern spelling of 'Charleston' did not take hold until the 1780s.)	1670	Capital of the English Province of Carolina.
**North Carolina**; Statehood in 1776	Charlestown (SC)	1707	Capital of the British Province of Carolina.
**North Carolina**; Statehood in 1776	New Bern	1712	Capital of the British Province of North Carolina.
**North Carolina**; Statehood in 1776	New Bern	**1776**	**Capitals of the State of North Carolina**.
**North Carolina**; Statehood in 1776	Fayetteville	1789	**Capitals of the State of North Carolina**.
**North Carolina**; Statehood in 1776	**Raleigh**	1794	**Capitals of the State of North Carolina**.
**North Dakota**; Statehood in 1889	Saint-Louis; San Luis; St. Louis (MO)	1765	Capital of the Spanish (though predominantly Francophone) district of Alta Louisiana.
**North Dakota**; Statehood in 1889	Saint-Louis; San Luis; St. Louis (MO)	1800	Capital of the French district of la Haute-Louisiane.
**North Dakota**; Statehood in 1889	Saint-Louis; San Luis; St. Louis (MO)	1804	Capital of the District of Louisiana (under the authority of the Indiana Territory).
**North Dakota**; Statehood in 1889	Saint-Louis; San Luis; St. Louis (MO)	1805	Capital of the Territory of Louisiana.
**North Dakota**; Statehood in 1889	Saint-Louis; San Luis; St. Louis (MO)	1812	Capital of the Territory of Missouri (1812–1821).
**North Dakota**; Statehood in 1889	Detroit (MI)	1834	Capital of the Territory of Michigan (east of Missouri River and White Earth River 1834–1836).
**North Dakota**; Statehood in 1889	Belmont (WI)	1836	Capitals of the Territory of Wisconsin (east of Missouri River and White Earth River 1836–1838).
**North Dakota**; Statehood in 1889	Burlington (IA)	1837	Capitals of the Territory of Wisconsin (east of Missouri River and White Earth River 1836–1838).
**North Dakota**; Statehood in 1889	Burlington (IA)	1838	Capitals of the Territory of Iowa (east of Missouri River and White Earth River 1838–1846).
**North Dakota**; Statehood in 1889	Iowa City (IA)	1841	Capitals of the Territory of Iowa (east of Missouri River and White Earth River 1838–1846).
**North Dakota**; Statehood in 1889	Saint Paul (MN)	1849	Capital of the Territory of Minnesota (east of Missouri River and White Earth River 1849–1858).
**North Dakota**; Statehood in 1889	Omaha (NE)	1854	Capital of the Territory of Nebraska (west of Missouri River or White Earth River 1854–1861).
**North Dakota**; Statehood in 1889	Yankton (SD)	1861	Capitals of the Territory of Dakota.
**North Dakota**; Statehood in 1889	**Bismarck**	1883	Capitals of the Territory of Dakota.
**North Dakota**; Statehood in 1889	**Bismarck**	**1889**	**Capital of the State of North Dakota**.
**Ohio**; Statehood in 1803	Marietta	1788	Capitals of the Territory Northwest of the River Ohio.
**Ohio**; Statehood in 1803	Chillicothe	1800	Capitals of the Territory Northwest of the River Ohio.
**Ohio**; Statehood in 1803	Chillicothe	**1803**	**Capitals of the State of Ohio**.
**Ohio**; Statehood in 1803	Zanesville	1810	**Capitals of the State of Ohio**.
**Ohio**; Statehood in 1803	Chillicothe	1812	**Capitals of the State of Ohio**.
**Ohio**; Statehood in 1803	**Columbus**	1816	**Capitals of the State of Ohio**.
**Oklahoma**; Statehood in 1907	Saint-Louis; San Luis; St. Louis (MO)	1765	Capital of the Spanish (though predominantly Francophone) district of Alta Louisiana.
**Oklahoma**; Statehood in 1907	Saint-Louis; San Luis; St. Louis (MO)	1800	Capital of the French district of la Haute-Louisiane.
**Oklahoma**; Statehood in 1907	Saint-Louis; San Luis; St. Louis (MO)	1804	Capital of the District of Louisiana (under the authority of the Indiana Territory).
**Oklahoma**; Statehood in 1907	Saint-Louis; San Luis; St. Louis (MO)	1805	Capital of the Territory of Louisiana.
**Oklahoma**; Statehood in 1907	Saint-Louis; San Luis; St. Louis (MO)	1812	Capital of the Territory of Missouri.
**Oklahoma**; Statehood in 1907	Arkansas Post (AR)	1819	Capitals of the Territory of Arkansaw (south of the parallel 36°30' north 1819–1824, southeastern Oklahoma 1824–1828).
**Oklahoma**; Statehood in 1907	Little Rock (AR)	1821	Capitals of the Territory of Arkansaw (south of the parallel 36°30' north 1819–1824, southeastern Oklahoma 1824–1828).
**Oklahoma**; Statehood in 1907	Fort Gibson	1824	De facto capital of the Indian Territory.
**Oklahoma**; Statehood in 1907	Tahlequah	1838	Capital of the Cherokee Nation.
**Oklahoma**; Statehood in 1907	Tuskahoma	1838	Capital of the Choctaw Nation.
**Oklahoma**; Statehood in 1907	Tishomingo	1855	Capital of the Chickasaw Nation.
**Oklahoma**; Statehood in 1907	Wewoka	1866	Capital of the Seminole Nation.
**Oklahoma**; Statehood in 1907	Okmulgee	1867	Capital of the Creek Nation.
**Oklahoma**; Statehood in 1907	Pawhuska	1872	Capital of the Osage Nation.
**Oklahoma**; Statehood in 1907	Guthrie	1889	Capital of the Territory of Oklahoma.
**Oklahoma**; Statehood in 1907	Guthrie	**1907**	**Capitals of the State of Oklahoma**.
**Oklahoma**; Statehood in 1907	**Oklahoma City**	1910	**Capitals of the State of Oklahoma**.
**Oregon**; Statehood in 1859	Champoeg	1843	Temporary capital of the disputed Oregon Country.
**Oregon**; Statehood in 1859	Oregon City	1843	Capital of the Provisional Government of Oregon in the Oregon Country.
**Oregon**; Statehood in 1859	Oregon City	1848	Capitals of the Territory of Oregon.
**Oregon**; Statehood in 1859	Salem	1851	Capitals of the Territory of Oregon.
**Oregon**; Statehood in 1859	Corvallis	1855	Capitals of the Territory of Oregon.
**Oregon**; Statehood in 1859	**Salem**	1855	Capitals of the Territory of Oregon.
**Oregon**; Statehood in 1859	**Salem**	**1859**	**Capital of the State of Oregon**.
**Pennsylvania**; Statehood in 1776	Fort Christina	1638	Capital of the Swedish colony of Nya Sverige.
**Pennsylvania**; Statehood in 1776	Philadelphia	1682	Capital of the English proprietary Colony of Pennsylvania.
**Pennsylvania**; Statehood in 1776	Philadelphia	1707	Capital of the British proprietary Colony of Pennsylvania.
**Pennsylvania**; Statehood in 1776	Philadelphia	**1776**	Capital of the Commonwealth of Pennsylvania. (Capital of the United States of America 1776, 1777, 1778–1783, and 1790–1800).
**Pennsylvania**; Statehood in 1776	Lancaster	1799	Capital of the Commonwealth of Pennsylvania. (Capital of the United States of America 1777).
**Pennsylvania**; Statehood in 1776	**Harrisburg**	1812	**Capital of the Commonwealth of Pennsylvania**.
**Rhode Island**; Statehood in 1776	Providence	1636	Capital of the English Colony of Providence 1636–1644.
**Rhode Island**; Statehood in 1776	Portsmouth	1639	Capital of the English Colony of Aquidneck Island 1639–1644.
**Rhode Island**; Statehood in 1776	Portsmouth	1644	Capital of the English Colony of Rhode Island.
**Rhode Island**; Statehood in 1776	Providence	1644	Capital of the English Colony of Rhode Island and Providence Plantations.
**Rhode Island**; Statehood in 1776	Boston (MA)	1686	Capital of the English Dominion of New-England in America.
**Rhode Island**; Statehood in 1776	Providence	1689	Capital of the English Colony of Rhode Island and Providence Plantations.
**Rhode Island**; Statehood in 1776	Providence	1707	Capital of the British Colony of Rhode Island and Providence Plantations.
**Rhode Island**; Statehood in 1776	five capitals	**1776**	From 1776 to 1853, the legislature of the State of Rhode Island and Providence Plantations rotated among the county seats of the state's five counties: Providence, Newport, East Greenwich, South Kingstown, and Bristol.
**Rhode Island**; Statehood in 1776	joint capitals	1854	From 1854 to 1899, the legislature of the State of Rhode Island and Providence Plantations alternated sessions between Providence and Newport.
**Rhode Island**; Statehood in 1776	**Providence**	1900	Capital of the State of Rhode Island and Providence Plantations.
**Rhode Island**; Statehood in 1776	**Providence**	2020	**Capital of the State of Rhode Island**.
**South Carolina**; Statehood in 1776	Charlesfort (SC)	1562	Capital of the French colony of Floride françoise.
**South Carolina**; Statehood in 1776	San Agustín (FL)	1565	Capital of the Spanish province of La Florida.
**South Carolina**; Statehood in 1776	Charlestown	1670	Capital of the English Province of Carolina.
**South Carolina**; Statehood in 1776	Charlestown	1707	Capital of the British Province of Carolina.
**South Carolina**; Statehood in 1776	Charlestown	1712	Capital of the British Province of South Carolina.
**South Carolina**; Statehood in 1776	Charlestown	**1776**	**Capitals of the State of South Carolina**.
**South Carolina**; Statehood in 1776	**Columbia**	1786	**Capitals of the State of South Carolina**.
**South Dakota**; Statehood in 1889	Saint-Louis; San Luis; St. Louis (MO)	1765	Capital of the Spanish (though predominantly Francophone) district of Alta Louisiana.
**South Dakota**; Statehood in 1889	Saint-Louis; San Luis; St. Louis (MO)	1800	Capital of the French district of la Haute-Louisiane.
**South Dakota**; Statehood in 1889	Saint-Louis; San Luis; St. Louis (MO)	1804	Capital of the District of Louisiana (under the authority of the Indiana Territory.)
**South Dakota**; Statehood in 1889	Saint-Louis; San Luis; St. Louis (MO)	1805	Capital of the Territory of Louisiana.
**South Dakota**; Statehood in 1889	Saint-Louis; San Luis; St. Louis (MO)	1812	Capital of the Territory of Missouri (1812–1821).
**South Dakota**; Statehood in 1889	Detroit (MI)	1834	Capital of the Territory of Michigan (east of Missouri River 1834–1836).
**South Dakota**; Statehood in 1889	Belmont (WI)	1836	Capitals of the Territory of Wisconsin (east of Missouri River 1836–1838).
**South Dakota**; Statehood in 1889	Burlington (IA)	1837	Capitals of the Territory of Wisconsin (east of Missouri River 1836–1838).
**South Dakota**; Statehood in 1889	Burlington (IA)	1838	Capitals of the Territory of Iowa (east of Missouri River 1838–1846).
**South Dakota**; Statehood in 1889	Iowa City (IA)	1841	Capitals of the Territory of Iowa (east of Missouri River 1838–1846).
**South Dakota**; Statehood in 1889	Saint Paul (MN)	1849	Capital of the Territory of Minnesota (east of Missouri River 1849–1858).
**South Dakota**; Statehood in 1889	Omaha (NE)	1854	Capital of the Territory of Nebraska (west of Missouri River 1854–1861).
**South Dakota**; Statehood in 1889	Yankton	1861	Capitals of the Territory of Dakota.
**South Dakota**; Statehood in 1889	Bismarck (ND)	1883	Capitals of the Territory of Dakota.
**South Dakota**; Statehood in 1889	**Pierre**	**1889**	**Capital of the State of South Dakota**.
**Tennessee**; Statehood in 1796	New Bern (NC)	1712	Capital of the British Province of North Carolina.
**Tennessee**; Statehood in 1796	New Bern (NC)	1776	Capital of the State of North Carolina.
**Tennessee**; Statehood in 1796	Rocky Mount	1790	Capitals of the Territory South of the River Ohio.
**Tennessee**; Statehood in 1796	White's Fort; Knoxville	1791	Capitals of the Territory South of the River Ohio.
**Tennessee**; Statehood in 1796	White's Fort; Knoxville	**1796**	Capital of the State of Tennessee.
**Tennessee**; Statehood in 1796	Kingston	1807	Capital of the State of Tennessee for one day in 1807 to fulfill treaty obligations with the Cherokee Nation.
**Tennessee**; Statehood in 1796	Knoxville	1807	**Capitals of the State of Tennessee**.
**Tennessee**; Statehood in 1796	Nashville	1812	**Capitals of the State of Tennessee**.
**Tennessee**; Statehood in 1796	Knoxville	1817	**Capitals of the State of Tennessee**.
**Tennessee**; Statehood in 1796	Murfreesboro	1818	**Capitals of the State of Tennessee**.
**Tennessee**; Statehood in 1796	**Nashville**	1826	**Capitals of the State of Tennessee**.
**Texas**; Statehood in 1845	Los Adaes (LA)	1729	Capitals of the Spanish province of Tejas.
**Texas**; Statehood in 1845	San Antonio de Béxar (now San Antonio)	1772	Capitals of the Spanish province of Tejas.
**Texas**; Statehood in 1845	Saltillo (COA)	1824	Capitals of the Mexican province of Coahuila y Tejas.
**Texas**; Statehood in 1845	Monclova (COA)	1833	Capitals of the Mexican province of Coahuila y Tejas.
**Texas**; Statehood in 1845	San Felipe de Austin	1835	Capital of the Provisional Government of Texas.
**Texas**; Statehood in 1845	Washington (now Washington-on-the-Brazos)	1836	Capitals of the Republic of Texas.
**Texas**; Statehood in 1845	Galveston	1836	Capitals of the Republic of Texas.
**Texas**; Statehood in 1845	Harrisburg	1836	Capitals of the Republic of Texas.
**Texas**; Statehood in 1845	Velasco	1836	Capitals of the Republic of Texas.
**Texas**; Statehood in 1845	Columbia	1836	Capitals of the Republic of Texas.
**Texas**; Statehood in 1845	Houston	1837	Capitals of the Republic of Texas.
**Texas**; Statehood in 1845	**Austin**	1839	Capitals of the Republic of Texas.
**Texas**; Statehood in 1845	**Austin**	**1845**	**Capital of the State of Texas**.
**Utah**; Statehood in 1896	Salt Lake City	1849	Capital of the extralegal State of Deseret.
**Utah**; Statehood in 1896	Fillmore	1850	Capitals of the Territory of Utah.
**Utah**; Statehood in 1896	**Salt Lake City**	1858	Capitals of the Territory of Utah.
**Utah**; Statehood in 1896	**Salt Lake City**	**1896**	**Capital of the State of Utah**.
**Vermont**; Statehood in 1791	Westminster	1777	Capitals of the Republic of New Connecticut.
**Vermont**; Statehood in 1791	Windsor	1777	Capitals of the Republic of New Connecticut.
**Vermont**; Statehood in 1791	Windsor	1777	Capital of the Vermont Republic.
**Vermont**; Statehood in 1791	Windsor	**1791**	**Capitals of the State of Vermont**.
**Vermont**; Statehood in 1791	**Montpelier**	1805	**Capitals of the State of Vermont**.
**Virginia**; Statehood in 1776	San Agustín (FL)	1565	Capital of the Spanish province of La Florida.
**Virginia**; Statehood in 1776	Jamestown	1607	Capitals of the English Colony of Virginia.
**Virginia**; Statehood in 1776	Middle Plantation; Williamsburg	1698	Capitals of the English Colony of Virginia.
**Virginia**; Statehood in 1776	Middle Plantation; Williamsburg	1707	Capital of the British Colony of Virginia.
**Virginia**; Statehood in 1776	Middle Plantation; Williamsburg	**1776**	Capital of the Commonwealth of Virginia.
**Virginia**; Statehood in 1776	**Richmond**	1780	**Capital of the Commonwealth of Virginia**. (Capital of the Confederate States of America 1861–1865.) (A rival pro-Union state government operated from Wheeling 1861–1863 and from Alexandria 1863–1865).
**Washington**; Statehood in 1889	Champoeg (OR)	1843	Temporary capital of the disputed Oregon Country.
**Washington**; Statehood in 1889	Oregon City (OR)	1843	Capital of the Provisional Government of Oregon in the Oregon Country.
**Washington**; Statehood in 1889	Oregon City (OR)	1848	Capitals of the Territory of Oregon.
**Washington**; Statehood in 1889	Salem (OR)	1851	Capitals of the Territory of Oregon.
**Washington**; Statehood in 1889	**Olympia**	1853	Capital of the Territory of Washington.
**Washington**; Statehood in 1889	**Olympia**	**1889**	**Capital of the State of Washington**.
**West Virginia**; Statehood in 1863	Jamestown (VA)	1619	Capitals of the English Colony of Virginia.
**West Virginia**; Statehood in 1863	Middle Plantation (VA); Williamsburg (VA)	1698	Capitals of the English Colony of Virginia.
**West Virginia**; Statehood in 1863	Middle Plantation (VA); Williamsburg (VA)	1707	Capital of the British Colony of Virginia.
**West Virginia**; Statehood in 1863	Middle Plantation (VA); Williamsburg (VA)	1776	Capitals of the Commonwealth of Virginia.
**West Virginia**; Statehood in 1863	Richmond (VA)	1780	Capitals of the Commonwealth of Virginia.
**West Virginia**; Statehood in 1863	Wheeling	1861	Capital of the rival pro-Union government of the Commonwealth of Virginia.
**West Virginia**; Statehood in 1863	Wheeling	**1863**	**Capitals of the State of West Virginia**.
**West Virginia**; Statehood in 1863	Charleston	1870	**Capitals of the State of West Virginia**.
**West Virginia**; Statehood in 1863	Wheeling	1875	**Capitals of the State of West Virginia**.
**West Virginia**; Statehood in 1863	**Charleston**	1885	**Capitals of the State of West Virginia**.
**Wisconsin**; Statehood in 1848	Marietta (OH)	1788	Capital of the Territory Northwest of the River Ohio.
**Wisconsin**; Statehood in 1848	Vincennes (IN)	1800	Capital of the Territory of Indiana.
**Wisconsin**; Statehood in 1848	Kaskaskia (IL)	1809	Capital of the Territory of Illinois.
**Wisconsin**; Statehood in 1848	Detroit (MI)	1818	Capital of the Territory of Michigan.
**Wisconsin**; Statehood in 1848	Belmont	1836	Capitals of the Territory of Wisconsin.
**Wisconsin**; Statehood in 1848	Burlington (IA)	1837	Capitals of the Territory of Wisconsin.
**Wisconsin**; Statehood in 1848	**Madison**	1838	Capitals of the Territory of Wisconsin.
**Wisconsin**; Statehood in 1848	**Madison**	**1848**	**Capital of the State of Wisconsin**.
**Wyoming**; Statehood in 1890	Lewiston (ID)	1863	Capital of the Territory of Idaho.
**Wyoming**; Statehood in 1890	Yankton (SD)	1864	Capital of the Territory of Dakota.
**Wyoming**; Statehood in 1890	**Cheyenne**	1869	Capital of the Territory of Wyoming.
**Wyoming**; Statehood in 1890	**Cheyenne**	**1890**	**Capital of the State of Wyoming**.

== See also ==
- History of the United States
- List of largest cities of U.S. states and territories by population
- List of state and territorial capitols in the United States
- List of states and territories of the United States
- Lists of capitals
- Outline of United States history
- Relocation of the United States Government to Trenton (1799)
- Territorial evolution of the United States
- Territories of the United States
- Timeline of geopolitical changes
