= Relocation of the United States Government to Trenton =

1799 evacuation of the federal government due to a yellow fever outbreak

- Date: August 24, 1799
- Location: Philadelphia, Pennsylvania, and Trenton, New Jersey
- Type: Emergency evacuation
- Cause: Yellow fever epidemic
- Outcome: U.S. Government abandons Philadelphia, temporarily reestablishes itself in Trenton; the federal government is restored to Philadelphia in November 1799

The relocation of the United States Government to Trenton occurred in August 1799 due to a yellow fever epidemic in the capital of the United States, Philadelphia. The government was restored to Philadelphia by the following November.

== Background ==
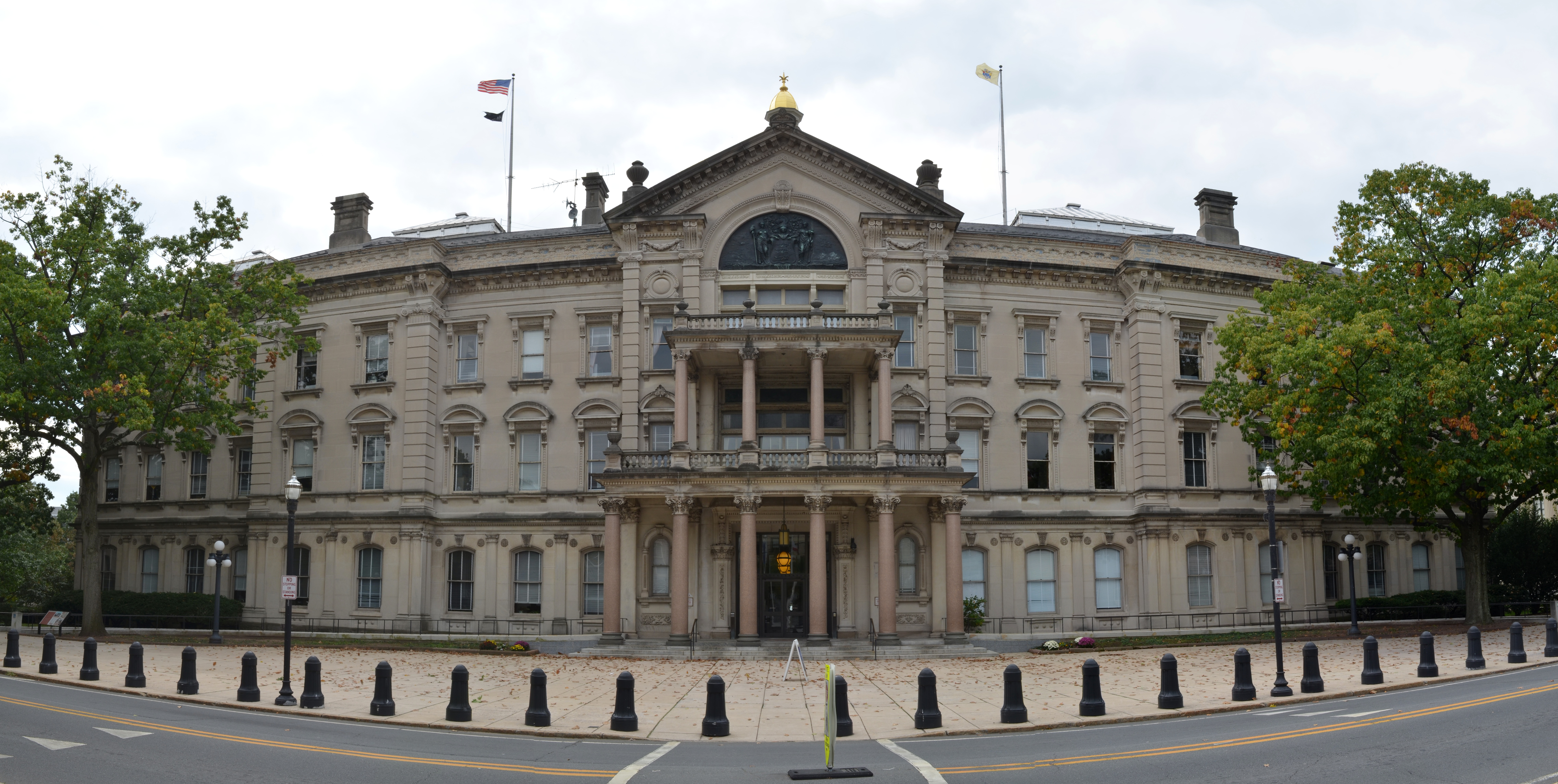
While in Trenton, the U.S. Department of State operated from the State House, pictured here in 2014.

"Sir ... I am moving this day my office to Trenton — seeing neither courage, wisdom nor duty in remaining longer at Philadelphia — which I believe could not be done without very great and unnecessary danger. I have the honor to be, with the highest respect and esteem, sir, your most obedient servant."

— Secretary of the Navy Benjamin Stoddert's letter to John Adams of 24 August 1799, informing the president of the Navy's withdrawal from Philadelphia.

Until 1800, Philadelphia served as the capital city of the United States and the seat of its federal government. In 1799, an outbreak of yellow fever spread rapidly through Philadelphia, the fourth such outbreak of the decade.

Incorporated in 1792, the city of Trenton, New Jersey, had developed into a thriving trade town by 1799. According to a contemporary account by François Alexandre Frédéric, duc de La Rochefoucauld-Liancourt, the city was "but very modest in appearance," though there were a "number of handsome villas which greatly enrich the landscape".

== Relocation ==
=== Evacuation of the government ===
As a continuity of government measure, on 26 August 1799, several of the principal offices of the United States Government evacuated Philadelphia for Trenton. Two days prior, the Navy had started its withdrawal from the city.

The Department of State completed its evacuation on 29 August 1799. The department's important documents, records, and furniture were sent by barge via the Delaware River from Philadelphia to Lamberton, New Jersey, and, from there, overland to Trenton. The Department of State's temporary quarters during this period were in the New Jersey State House.

Approval for evacuation of the United States Department of War was issued by President John Adams via post on 30 August 1799 from his personal residence in Quincy, Massachusetts.

=== Adams arrives in Trenton ===
Adams initially expressed reluctance at the prospect of joining the rest of the government in Trenton due to the disagreeable accommodations available in the city, instead remaining in Quincy from where he ran the government via correspondence. However, after word reached the United States of the deteriorating situation in France and the Coup of 30 Prairial VII, the Cabinet of the United States insisted Adams join them. In a 13 September letter to Adams, Secretary of the Navy Stoddert advanced his apologies for the lack of amenities in Trenton but expressed his strong desire that Adams join the Cabinet in the city.

I ... cannot but lament that the accommodations to be obtained here are very far inferior to such as would be suitable for the President of the United States. Indeed, I am afraid none could be obtained which would not be extremely inconvenient and disagreeable to both Mrs. Adams and yourself. Yet having no motive unconnected with your honor and that of the government, I hope you will pardon my freedom in adhering to my wish that you would join the officers here ...

Adams capitulated and departed Quincy for Trenton with a small staff, though First Lady Abigail Adams remained in Massachusetts. Adams and his entourage entered Trenton on 10 October 1799. His arrival was celebrated with a fireworks display.

=== Repatriation to Philadelphia and aftermath ===
The United States Government restored itself to Philadelphia in the middle of November, after the epidemic had been brought under control. Six months later, on 15 May 1800, Adams ordered the government's relocation to the new capital city of Washington, D.C.
