= White Earth River (North Dakota) =

Coordinates: 48°08′49″N 102°44′06″W

Location
- Country: United States
- State: North Dakota

Physical characteristics
- Length: 80 km (50 mi)

The White Earth River is a tributary of the Missouri River, approximately 50 mi (80 km) long, in northwestern North Dakota in the United States. It rises in the plains of southwestern Burke County, approximately 25 mi (40 km) east of Wildrose. It flows south through Mountrail County and joins the Missouri in Lake Sakakawea.

The White Earth River was included as part of the western boundary of the Minnesota Territory (1849-1858). The law establishing the Minnesota Territory stated the boundary would follow the White Earth River to the Canadian Border. However, it was unknown at that time that the river's source was not north of the international border.

== See also ==
- List of North Dakota rivers
- Territorial evolution of the United States
