= Trenton City Hall =

- U.S. National Register of Historic Places
- New Jersey Register of Historic Places
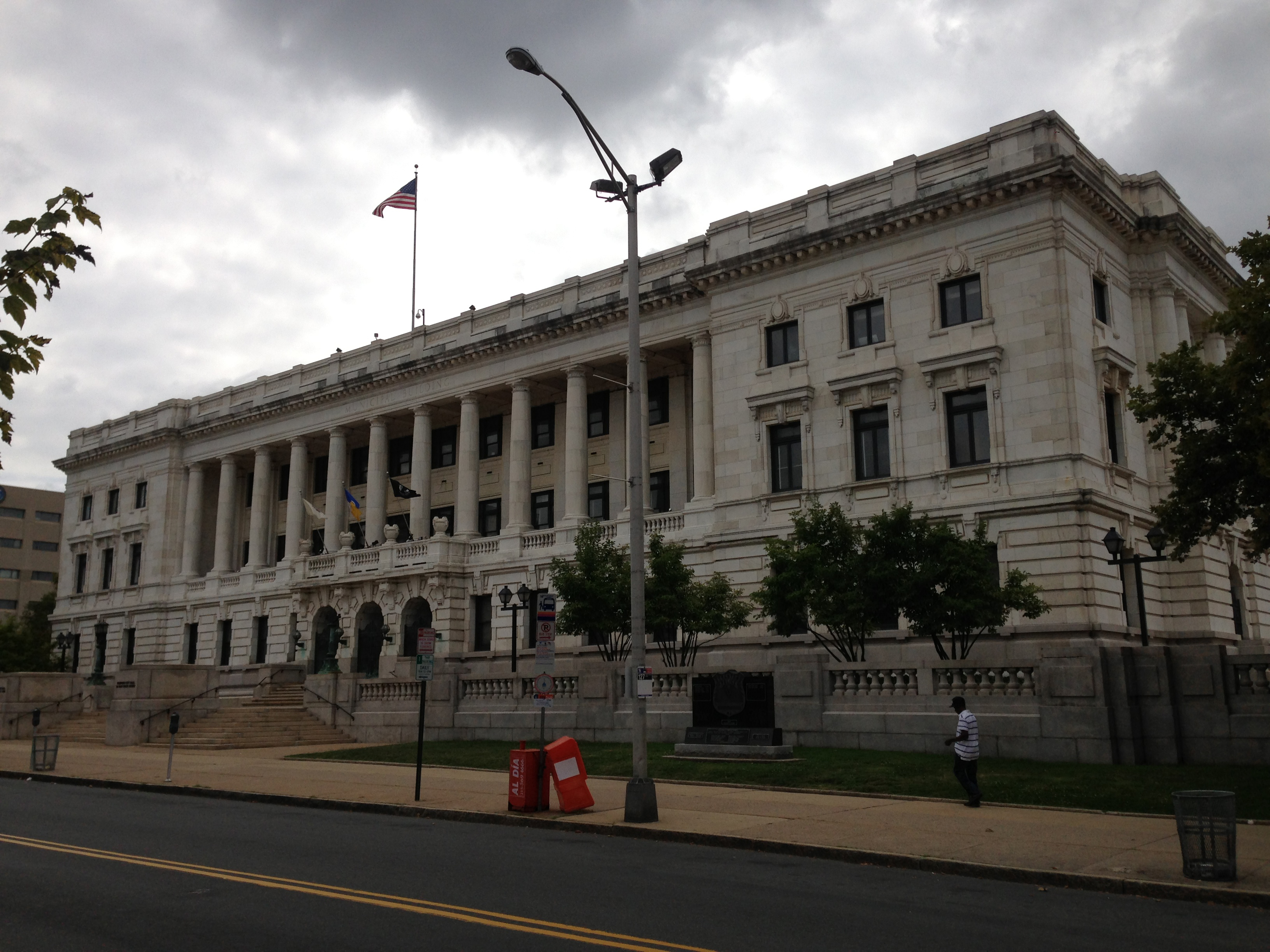

- Location within Mercer County, New Jersey Location within New Jersey Location within the United States
- Location: 309 State Street, Trenton, New Jersey
- Coordinates: 40°13′12″N 74°45′34″W
- Area: less than one acre
- Built: 1907
- Architect: Roberts, Spencer
- Architectural style: Renaissance
- NRHP reference No.: 78001771
- NJRHP No.: 1802

Significant dates
- Added to NRHP: January 30, 1978
- Designated NJRHP: April 15, 1977

Trenton City Hall is located in Trenton, Mercer County, New Jersey, United States. The white marble building was built in 1907 and added to the National Register of Historic Places on January 30, 1978. The building contains murals by American painter Everett Shinn.

== See also ==
- National Register of Historic Places listings in Mercer County, New Jersey
