= Trenton, New Jersey =

Capital city of New Jersey, United States

- State capital
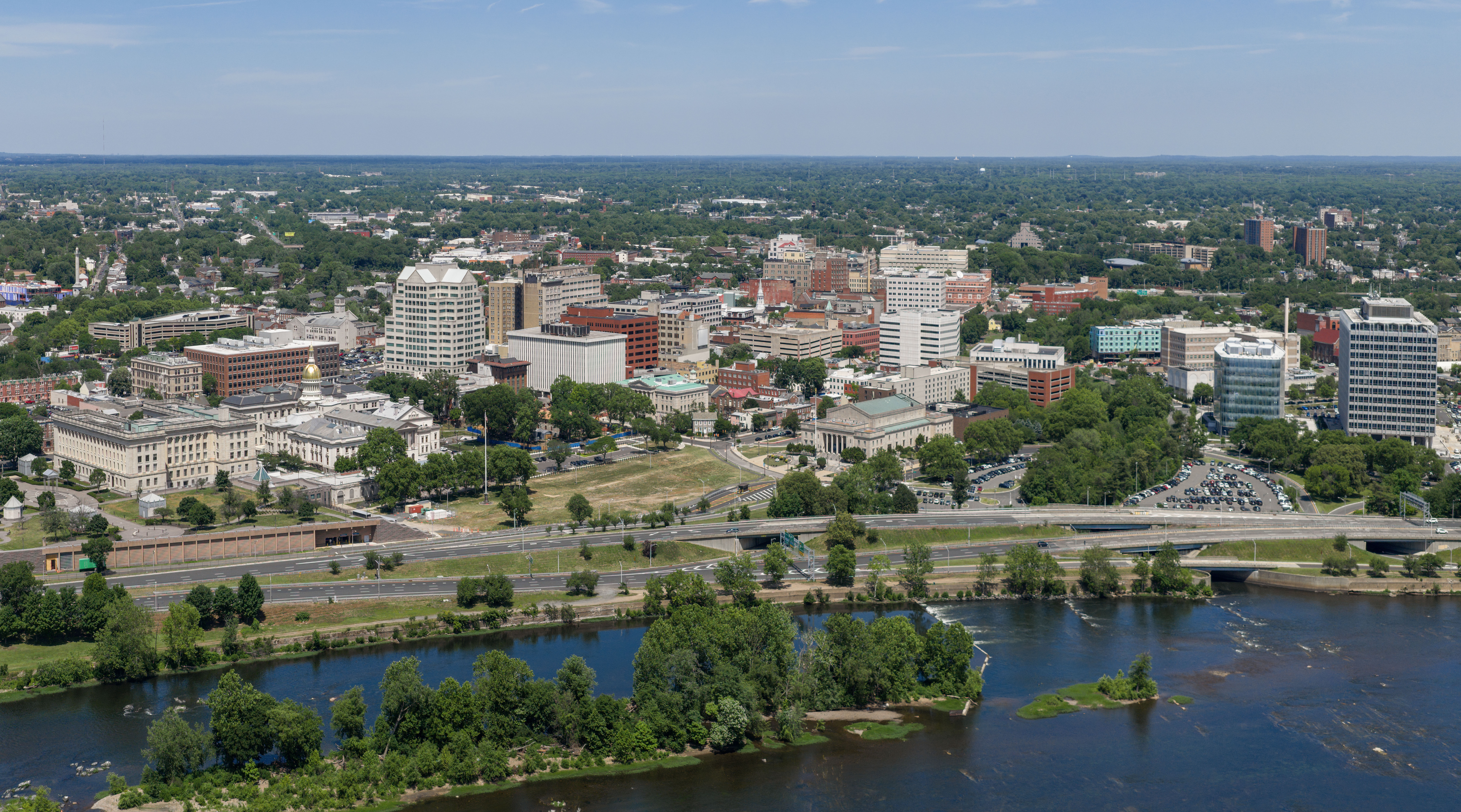
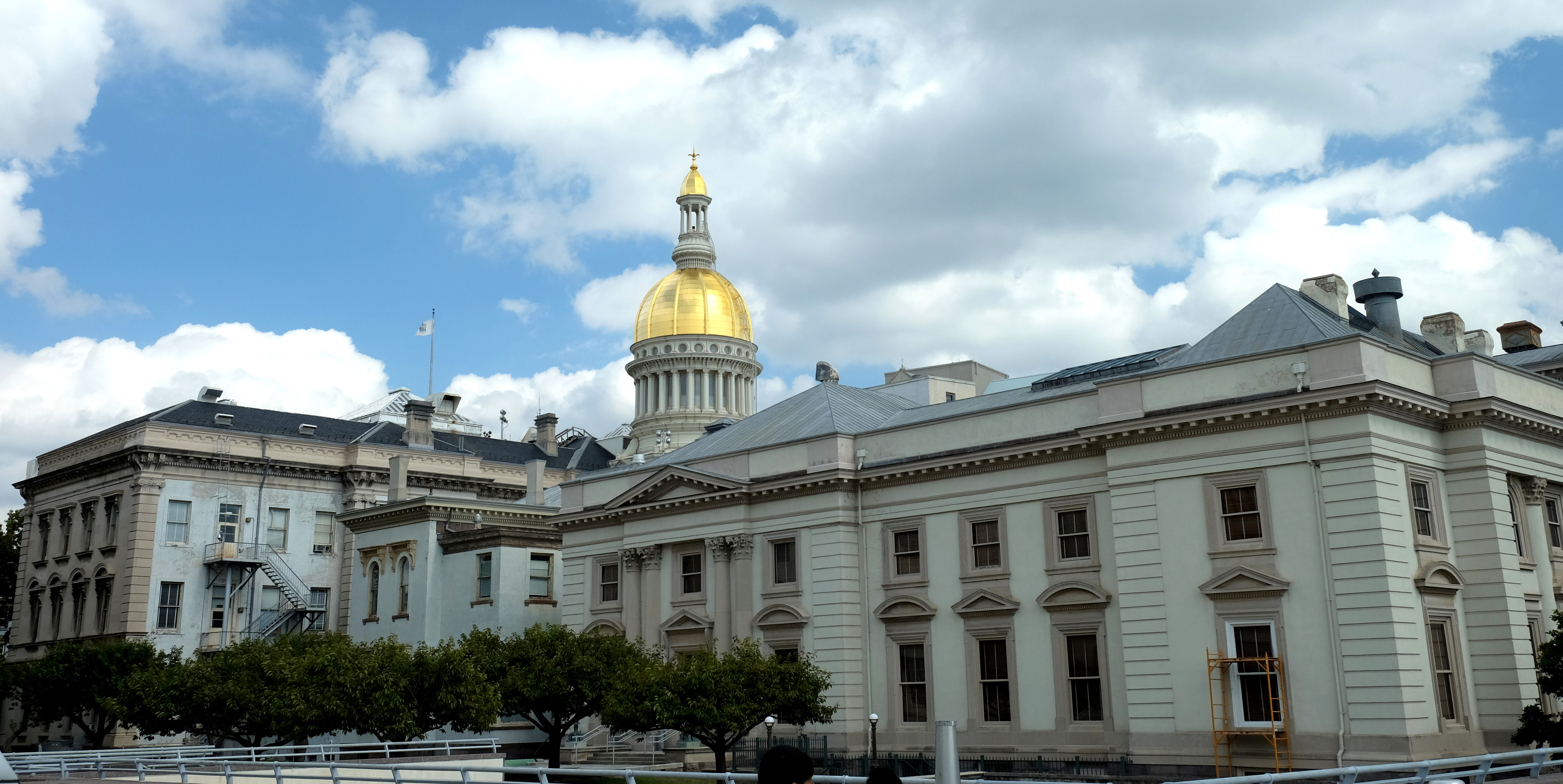
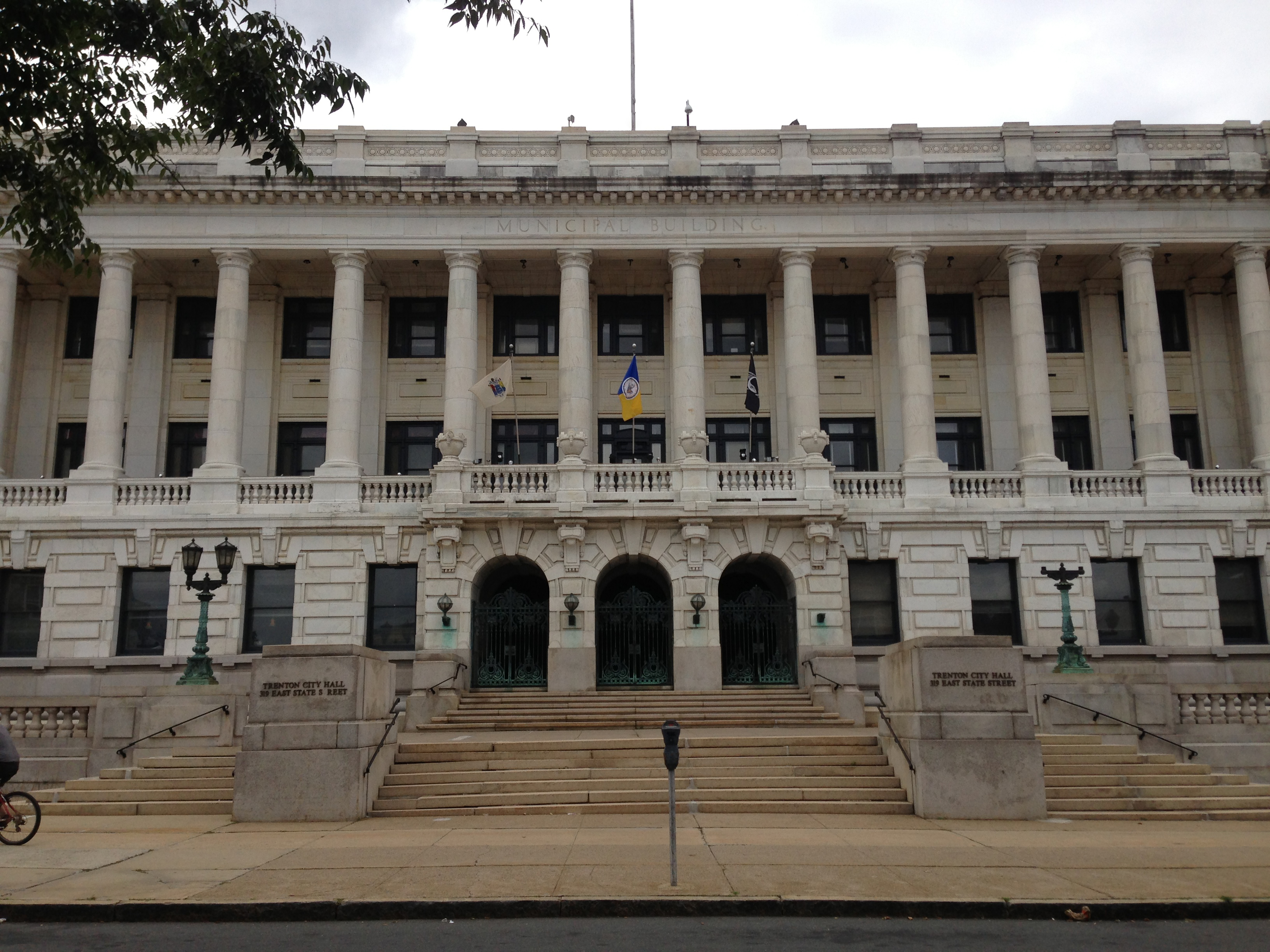
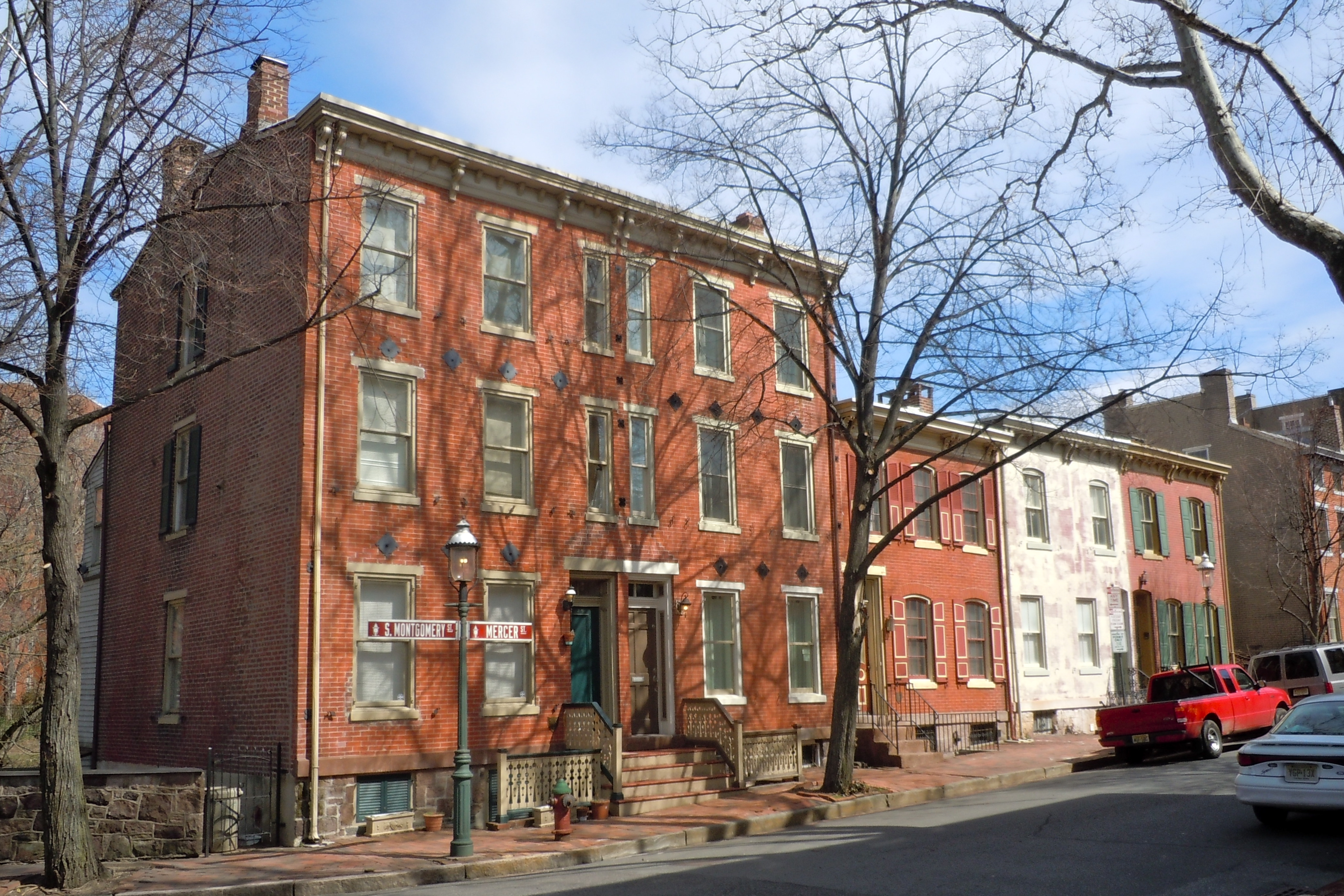
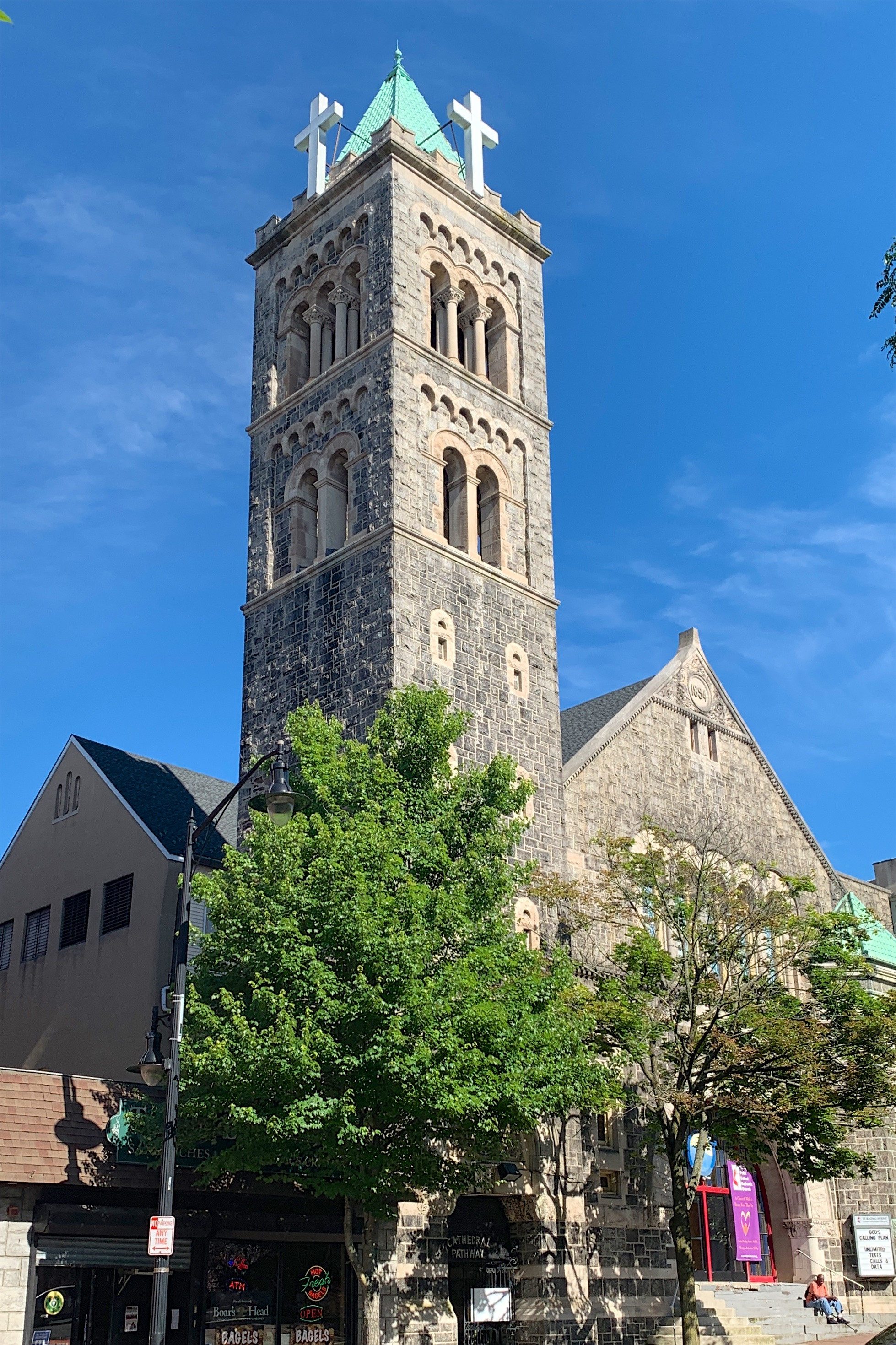
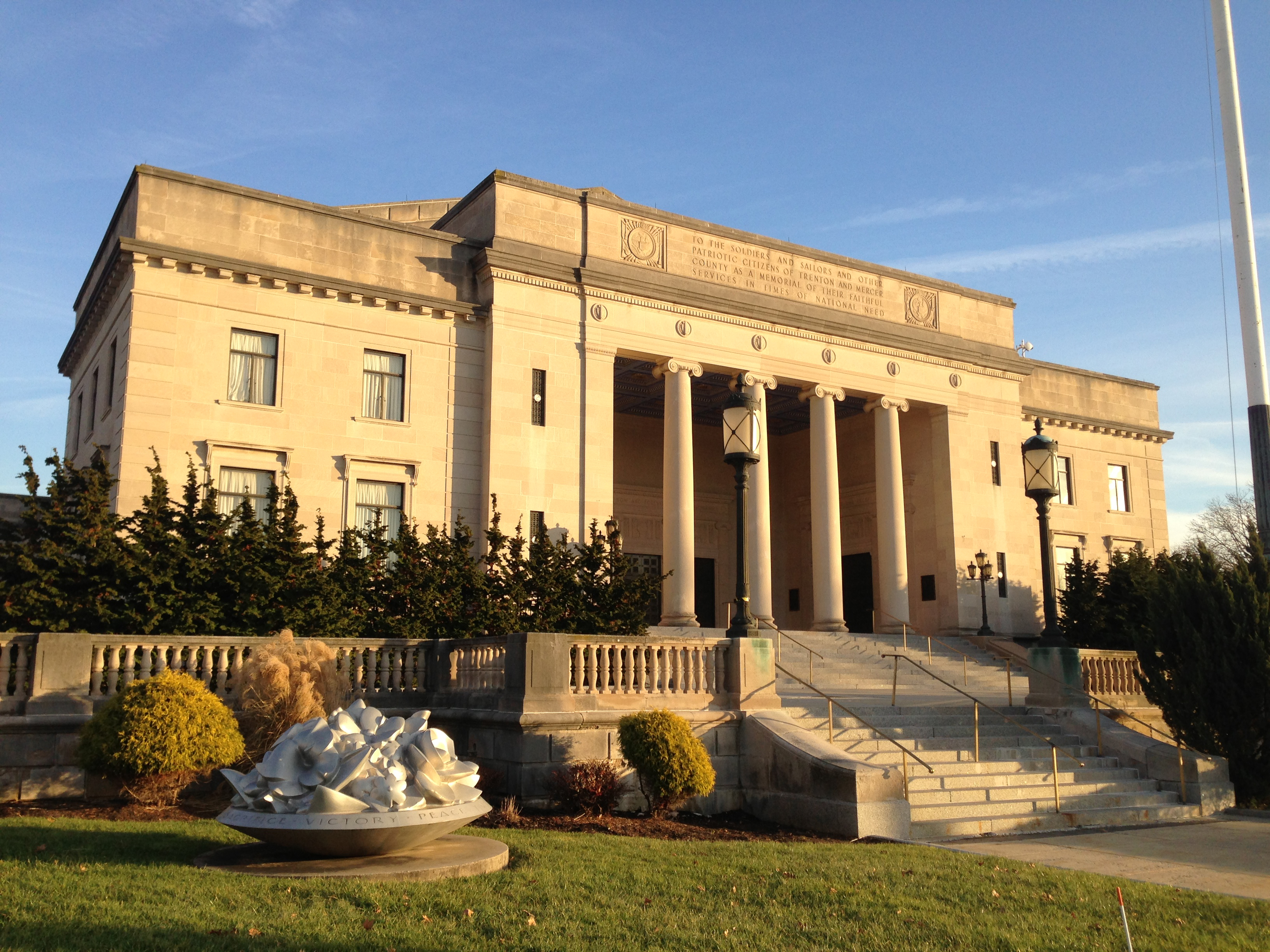
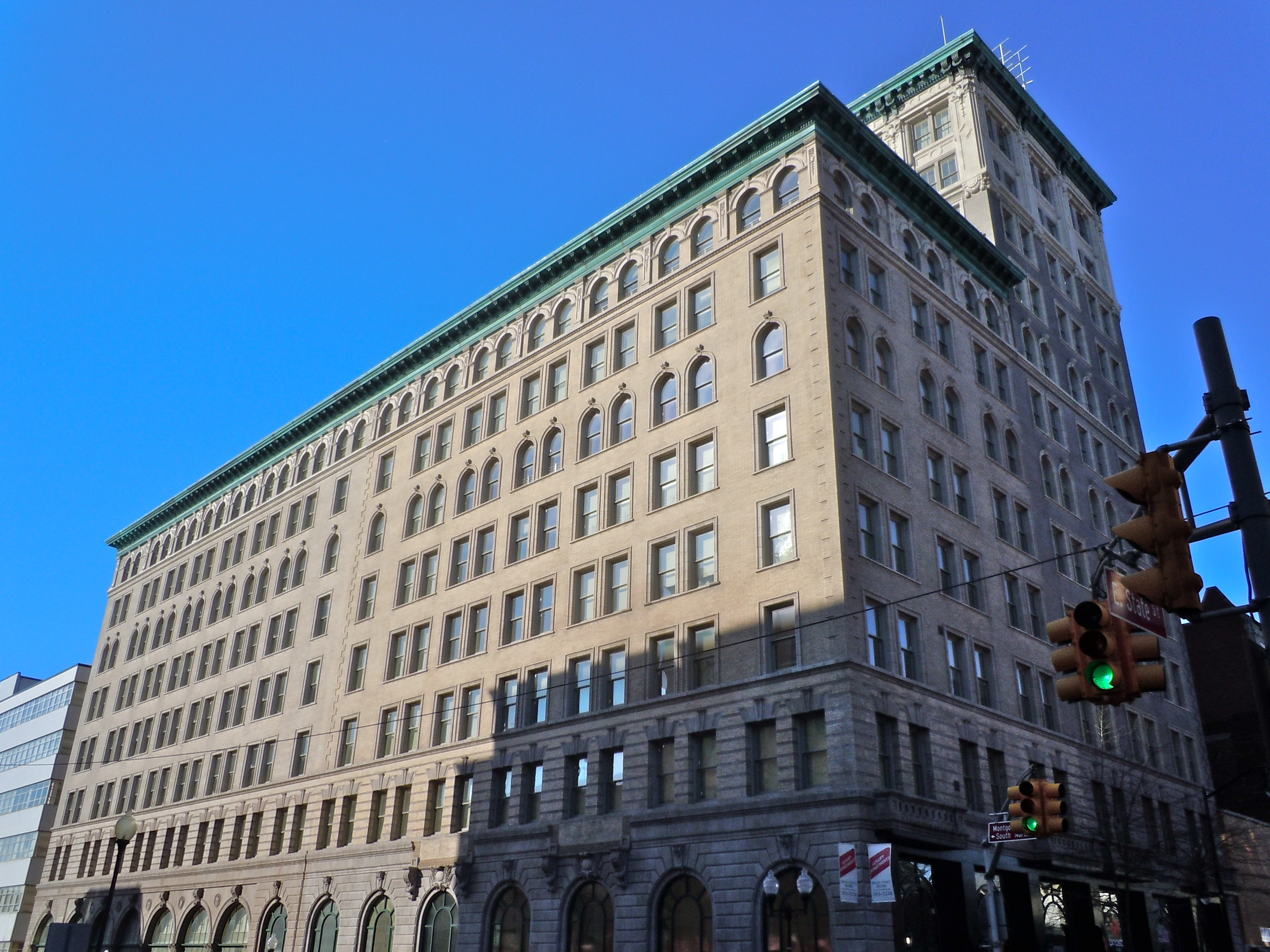
- Downtown Trenton along the Delaware River New Jersey State House Trenton City Hall Mill Hill Historic District Turning Point Church Trenton War Memorial Broad Street National Bank

- Flag Seal
- Nicknames: The Capital City, Turning Point of the Revolution
- Motto: "Trenton Makes, The World Takes"
- Interactive map of Trenton, New Jersey
- Location within Mercer County, New Jersey Location within New Jersey Location within the United States
- Coordinates: 40°13′13″N 74°45′57″W
- Country: United States
- State: New Jersey
- County: Mercer
- Founded: June 3, 1719
- Incorporated: November 13, 1792
- Named for: William Trent

Government
  - Type: Faulkner Act
  - Body: City Council
  - Mayor: Reed Gusciora (term ends December 31, 2026)
  - Administrator: Adam E. Cruz
  - Municipal clerk: Brandon Garcia

Area
  - State capital: 8.20 sq mi (21.25 km^{2})
  - Land: 7.61 sq mi (19.70 km^{2})
  - Water: 0.60 sq mi (1.55 km^{2}) 7.62%
  - Rank: 229th of 565 in state 9th of 12 in county
- Elevation: 59 ft (18 m)

Population (2020)
  - State capital: 90,871
  - Estimate (2025): 91,506
  - Rank: 383rd in country (as of 2025); 10th of 565 in state 2nd of 12 in county
  - Density: 11,989.8/sq mi (4,629.3/km^{2})
  - Rank: 25th of 565 in state 1st of 12 in county
  - Urban: 370,422 (US: 112th)
  - Urban density: 2,782/sq mi (1,074.3/km^{2})
  - Metro: 387,340 (US: 143rd)
- Time zone: UTC−05:00 (Eastern (EST))
  - Summer (DST): UTC−04:00 (Eastern (EDT))
- ZIP Codes: 08608–08611, 08618–08620, 08625, 08628, 08629, 08638
- Area code: 609/640
- FIPS code: 3402174000
- GNIS feature ID: 0885421
- Website: www.trentonnj.org

Trenton is the capital city of the U.S. state of New Jersey and the county seat of Mercer County. It was the capital of the United States from November 1 until December 24, 1784. Trenton and Princeton are the two principal cities of the Trenton–Princeton metropolitan statistical area, which encompasses those cities and all of Mercer County for statistical purposes and constitutes part of the New York combined statistical area by the U.S. Census Bureau. However, Trenton directly borders the Philadelphia metropolitan area to its west, and the city was part of the Philadelphia combined statistical area from 1990 until 2000.

In the 2020 United States census, Trenton was the fifth largest city in Central Jersey and the 10th-most-populous municipality statewide, with a population of 90,871, an increase of 5,958 (+7.0%) from the 2010 census count of 84,913, which in turn had reflected a decline of 490 (−0.6%) from the 85,403 counted in the 2000 census. The Census Bureau's Population Estimates Program calculated that the city's population was 91,506 in 2025, ranking the city the 383rd-most-populous in the country. Trenton is the only city in New Jersey that is served by three commuter rail transit systems (Amtrak, NJ Transit, and SEPTA), and the city has encouraged a spate of transit-oriented development.

Trenton dates back at least to June 3, 1719, when mention was made of a constable being appointed for Trenton while the area was still part of Hunterdon County. Boundaries were recorded for Trenton Township as of March 2, 1720. A courthouse and jail were constructed in Trenton around 1720, and the Freeholders of Hunterdon County met annually in Trenton.

On November 25, 1790, Trenton became New Jersey's capital, and by November 13, 1792, the City of Trenton was formed within Trenton Township. Trenton Township was incorporated as one of New Jersey's initial group of 104 townships by an act of the New Jersey Legislature on February 21, 1798.

The city historically had a major manufacturing industry, with factories producing iron, steel, rubber, pottery, and other products that served the nation. Today Trenton's economy is dominated by the Government of New Jersey.

== History ==
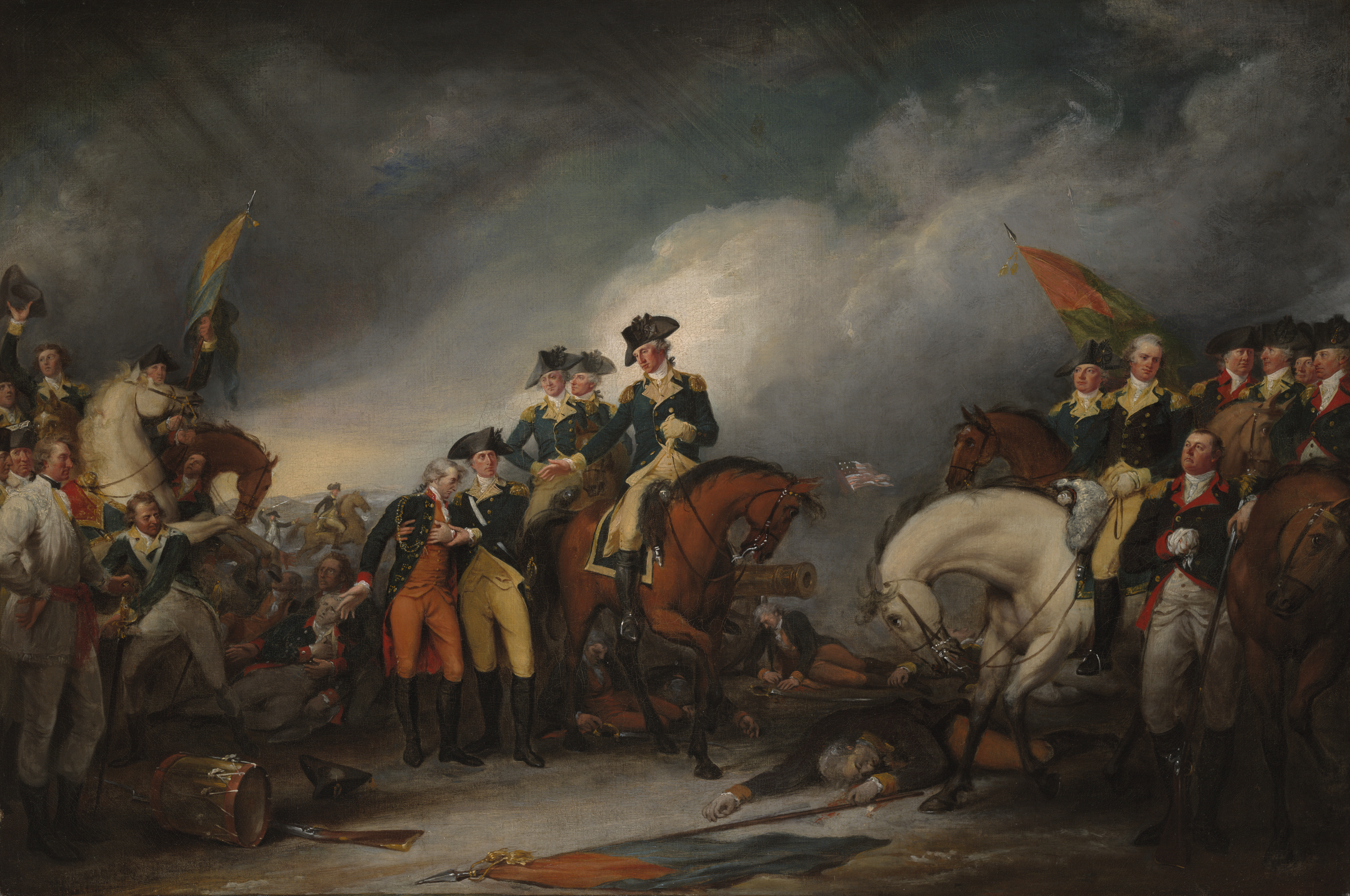
The Capture of the Hessians at Trenton, December 26, 1776, a painting by John Trumbull

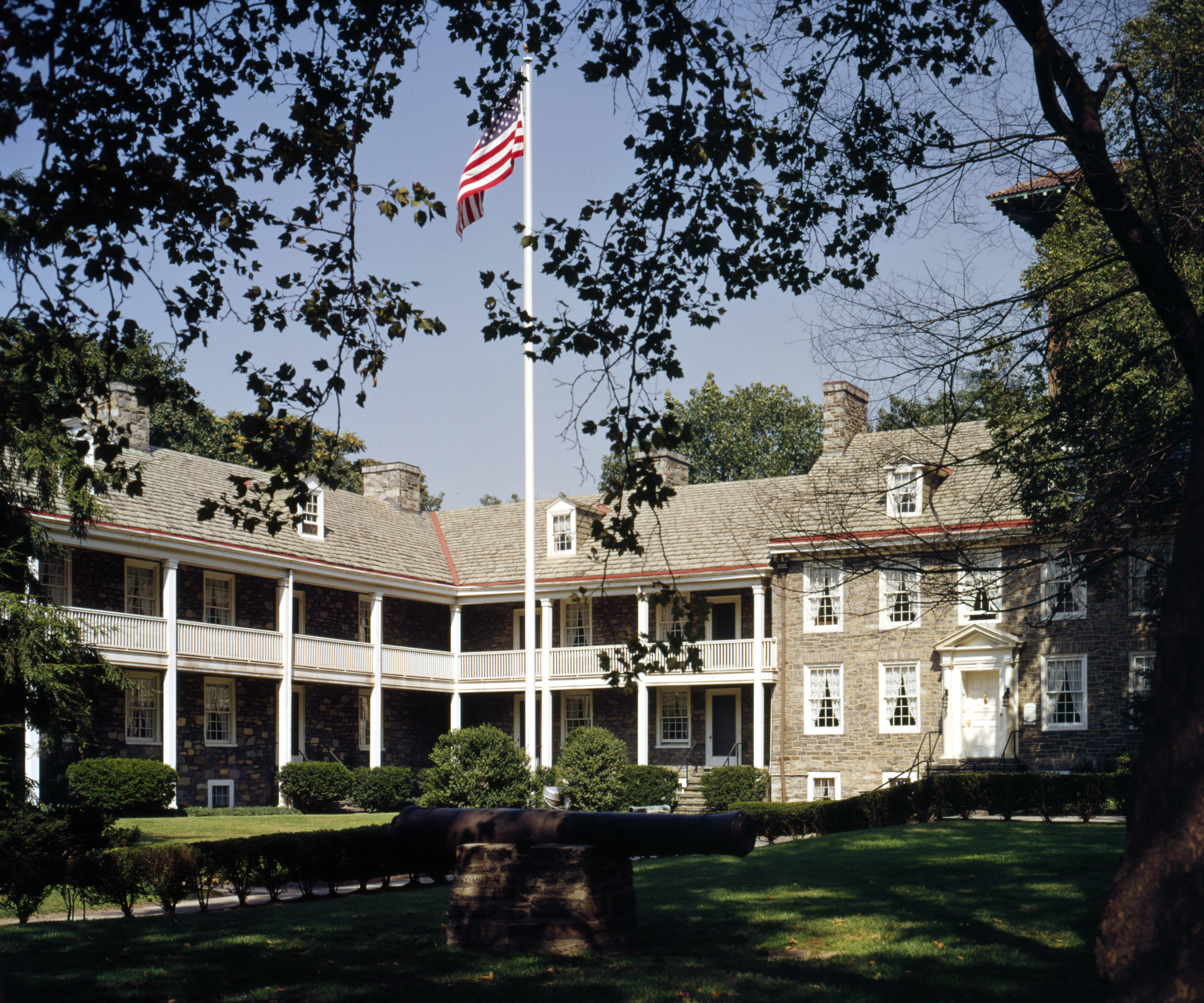
The Old Barracks in Trenton

The earliest known inhabitants of the area that is today Trenton were the Lenape Native Americans, specifically the Axion band who were the largest tribe on the Delaware River in the mid-17th century.

The first European settlement in what would become Trenton was established by Quakers in 1679, in the region then called the Falls of the Delaware, led by Mahlon Stacy from Handsworth, Sheffield, England. Quakers were being persecuted in England at this time, and North America provided an opportunity to exercise their religious freedom.

By 1719, the town adopted the name "Trent-towne", after William Trent, one of its leading landholders who purchased much of the surrounding land from Stacy's family. This name was later shortened to "Trenton".

The first municipal boundaries were recorded on March 2, 1720, and a courthouse and jail were constructed around the same time.

In 1758, the Old Barracks were built to house British soldiers during the French and Indian War. On January 19, 1764, Benjamin Franklin, Postmaster General of the colonies, appointed Abraham Hunt, a Lieutenant Colonel in the New Jersey Hunterdon County militia and prominent merchant in Trenton, as the city's first postmaster. Hunt was again appointed Trenton's postmaster on October 13, 1775, shortly after the American Revolutionary War broke out.

During the American Revolutionary War, Trenton was the site of the Battle of Trenton. On December 25–26, 1776, George Washington and his army crossed the icy Delaware River to Trenton, where they defeated Hessian troops garrisoned there. The second battle of Trenton, Battle of the Assunpink Creek, was fought here on January 2, 1777. After the war, the Congress of the Confederation met for two months at the French Arms Tavern from November 1, 1784, to December 24, 1784. While the city was preferred by New England and other northern states as a permanent capital for the new country, the southern states ultimately prevailed in their choice of a location south of the Mason–Dixon line. On April 21, 1789, the city hosted a reception for George Washington on his journey to New York City for his first inauguration. The Trenton Battle Monument, a 150-foot (46 m) granite column topped with a statue of George Washington, was built in 1893 to commemorate the battle.

Trenton became the state capital in 1790, but prior to that year the New Jersey Legislature often met in the city. The city was incorporated on November 13, 1792. In 1792, the New Jersey State House was built, making it the third-oldest state house in the country. In 1799, the federal government relocated its offices to Trenton for a period of several months, following an outbreak of yellow fever in the then-capital of Philadelphia.

During the War of 1812, the United States Army's primary hospital was at a site on Broad Street.

Trenton had maintained an iron industry since the 1730s and a pottery industry since at least 1723. The completion of both the Delaware and Raritan Canal and the Camden and Amboy Railroad in the 1830s spurred industrial development in Trenton. In 1845, industrialist Peter Cooper opened a rolling mill. In 1848, engineer John Roebling moved his wire rope mill to the city, where suspension cables for bridges were manufactured, including the Brooklyn Bridge. Throughout the 19th century, Trenton grew steadily, as European immigrants came to work in its pottery and wire rope mills. Trenton became known as an industrial hub for railroads, trucking, rubber, plastics, metalworking, electrical, automobile parts, glass, and textiles industries.

The city's largest and most long-standing industry was ceramics. From the 1850s to the 1950s, scores of pottery companies called the city home and Trenton became known as the "Staffordshire of America." In the late 19th century, Walter Scott Lenox founded the Ceramic Art Company, which eventually became Lenox, Inc., a nationally known producer of fine china. Lenox designed and manufactured White House china for multiple Presidents of the United States.

On February 22, 1834, portions of Trenton Township were taken to form Ewing Township. The remaining portion of Trenton Township was absorbed by the city on April 10, 1837. In 1837, with the population now too large for government by council, a new mayoral government was adopted, with by-laws that remain in operation to this day. During the latter half of the century, Trenton annexed multiple municipalities: South Trenton Borough on April 14, 1851, portions of Nottingham Township on April 14, 1856, Chambersburg and Millham Township on March 30, 1888, and Wilbur borough on February 28, 1898. Portions of Ewing Township and Hamilton Township were annexed to Trenton on March 23, 1900.

In 1855, the College of New Jersey was founded in Trenton. In 1865, Rider University was also founded in Trenton. Mercer Community College began in Trenton in 1966.

The Trenton Six were a group of black men arrested for the alleged murder of an elderly white shopkeeper in January 1948 with a soda bottle. They were arrested without warrants, denied lawyers and sentenced to death based on what were described as coerced confessions. With the involvement of the Communist Party and the NAACP, there were several appeals, resulting in a total of four trials. Eventually the accused men (with the exception of one who died in prison) were released. The incident was the subject of the book Jersey Justice: The Story of the Trenton Six, written by Cathy Knepper.

In the 1950s, the State of New Jersey purchased a large portion of what was then Stacy Park, a large riverfront park located next to downtown that contained large open lawns, landscaping, and promenades. Much of the park was demolished to make way for the construction of Route 29, despite the protests toward its construction. After it was built, the area was then mostly filled with parking lots and scattered state office buildings, disconnecting the city from the riverfront.

=== Riots of 1968 ===
The Trenton Riots of 1968 were a major civil disturbance that took place during the week following the assassination of civil rights leader Martin Luther King Jr. in Memphis on April 4. Race riots broke out nationwide following the murder of the civil rights activist. More than 200 Trenton businesses, mostly in Downtown, were ransacked and burned. More than 300 people, most of them young Black men, were arrested on charges ranging from assault and arson to looting and violating the mayor's emergency curfew. In addition to 16 injured policemen, 15 firefighters were treated at city hospitals for injuries suffered while fighting raging blazes or inflicted by rioters. Area residents pulled false alarms and would then throw bricks at firefighters responding to the alarm boxes. This experience, along with similar experiences in other major cities, effectively ended the use of open-cab fire engines. As an interim measure, the Trenton Fire Department fabricated temporary cab enclosures from steel deck plating until new equipment could be obtained. The losses incurred by downtown businesses were initially estimated by the city to be $7 million, but the total of insurance claims and settlements came to $2.5 million.

Trenton's Battle Monument neighborhood was hardest hit. Since the 1950s, North Trenton had witnessed a steady exodus of middle-class residents, and the riots spelled white flight for North Trenton. By the 1970s, the region had the reputation as one of the most blighted and crime-ridden in the city.

== Geography ==
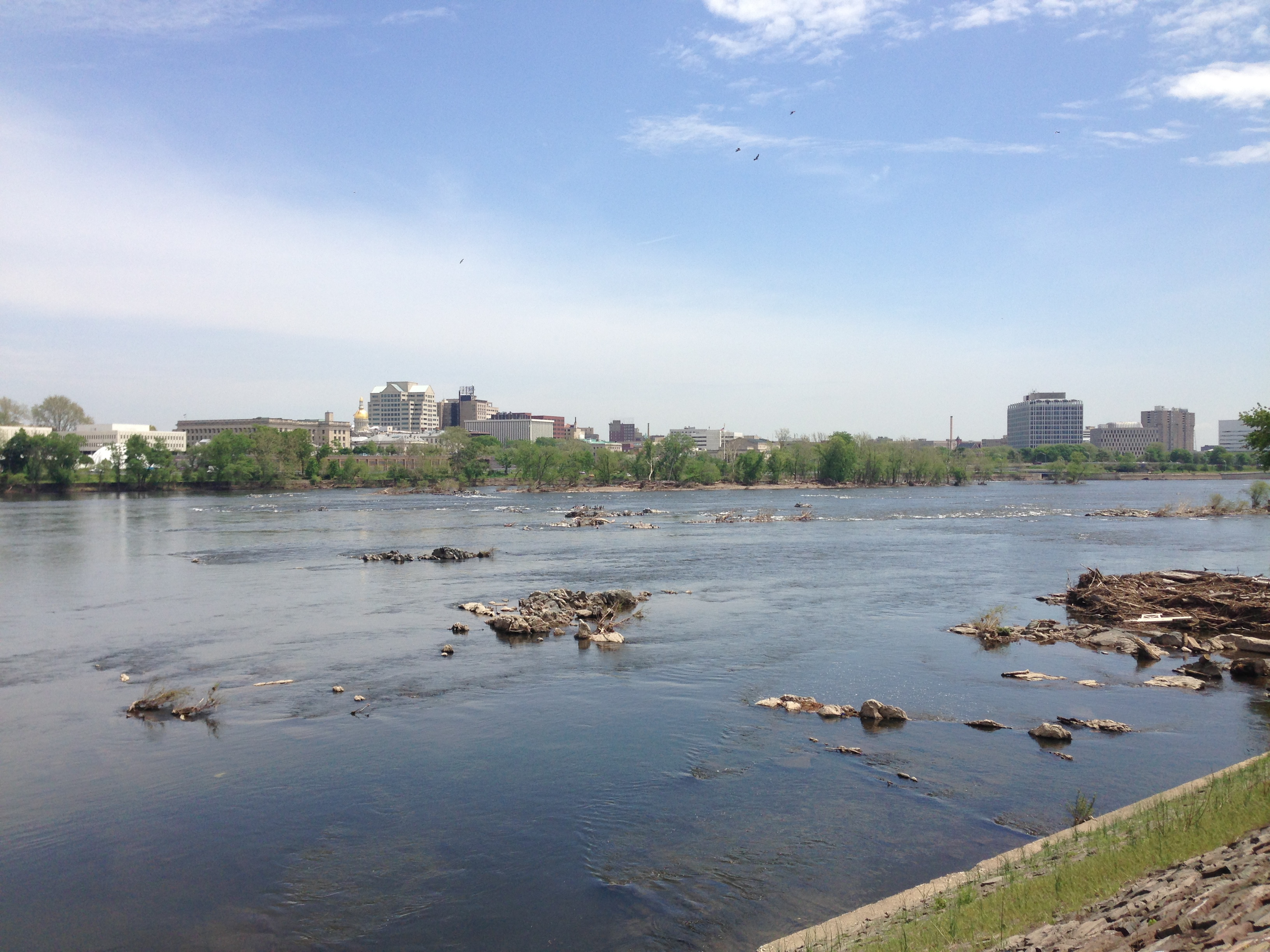
The "Falls of the Delaware," part of the Delaware River in Trenton

According to the U.S. Census Bureau, the city had a total area of 8.21 square miles (21.25 km^{2}), including 7.58 square miles (19.63 km^{2}) of land and 0.63 square miles (1.62 km^{2}) of water (7.62%). In terms of land area, Trenton is also the second-smallest of the United States capital cities, behind Annapolis, Maryland. Although it is the largest city by population in Mercer County.

Trenton is located near the geographic center of the state, which is located 5 miles (8.0 km) southeast of the city.

Mercer County constitutes its own metropolitan statistical area, the Trenton-Princeton MSA, which is part of the Tri-State Region. Locals consider Trenton to be a part of Central Jersey, and thus part of neither North Jersey nor South Jersey though sometimes included in both. They are generally split as to whether they are within New York or Philadelphia's sphere of influence. While it is closer to Philadelphia, many people commute to New York City and have moved to Trenton to escape the New York region's high housing costs.

Trenton is one of two state capitals that border another state—the other being Carson City, Nevada.

Trenton borders Ewing Township, Hamilton Township and Lawrence Township in Mercer County; and Falls Township, Lower Makefield Township and Morrisville in Bucks County, Pennsylvania, across the Delaware River in Pennsylvania.

The Northeast Corridor goes through Trenton. A straight line drawn between Center City, Philadelphia and Downtown Manhattan would pass within 2000 feet of the New Jersey State House.

Several bridges across the Delaware River connect Trenton to Morrisville, Pennsylvania, all of which are operated by the Delaware River Joint Toll Bridge Commission. The Trenton–Morrisville Toll Bridge, originally constructed in 1952, stretches 1,324 feet (404 m), carrying U.S. Route 1. The Lower Trenton Bridge, bearing the legend "TRENTON MAKES THE WORLD TAKES", is a 1,022-foot (312 m) span that was constructed in 1928 on the site of a bridge that dates back to 1804. The Calhoun Street Bridge, dating back to 1884, is 1,274 feet (388 m) long.

=== Neighborhoods ===
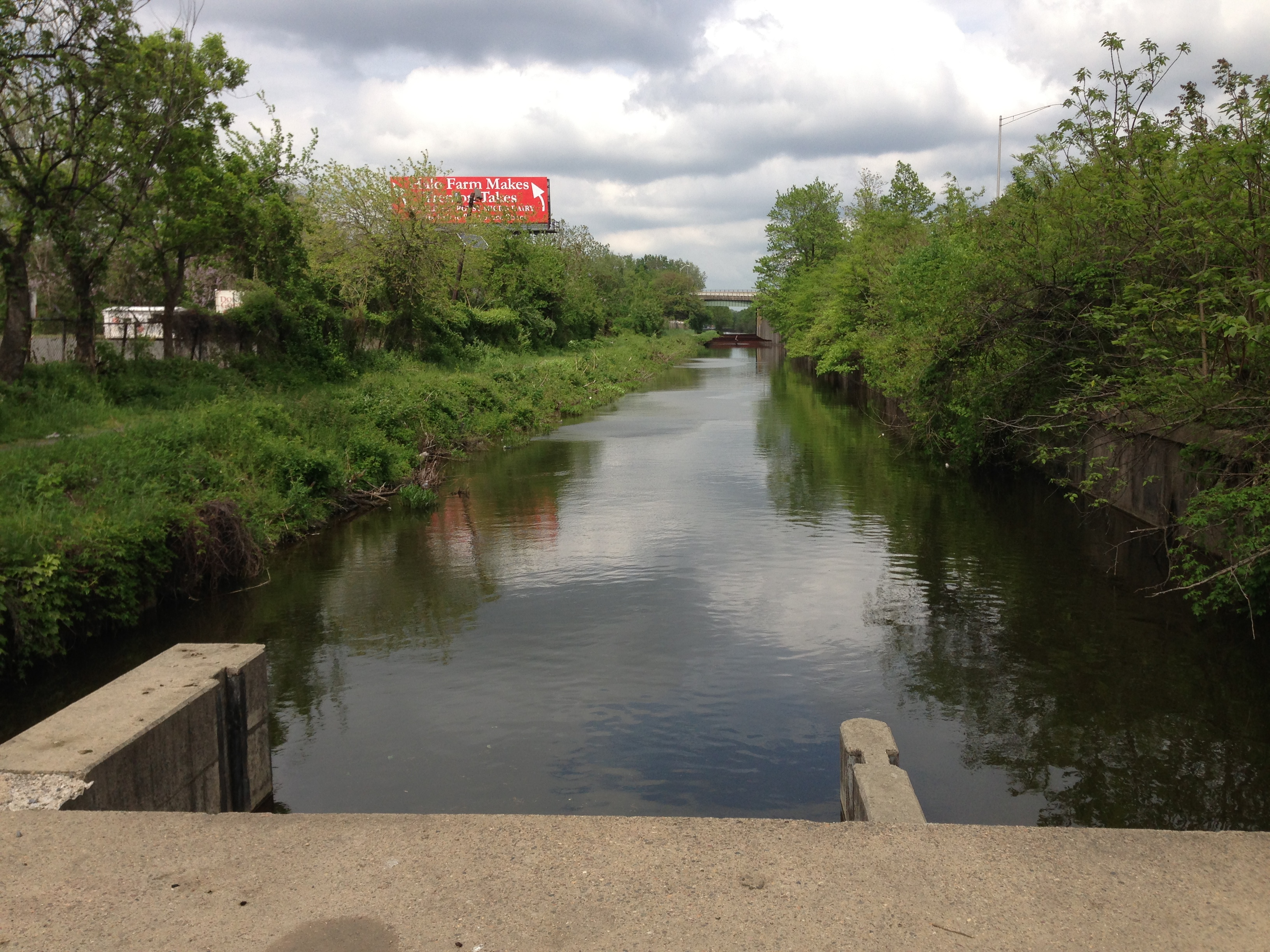
Delaware and Raritan Canal flowing under Mulberry St.

Trenton is home to numerous neighborhoods and sub-neighborhoods. The main neighborhoods are taken from the four cardinal directions. Trenton was once home to large Italian, Hungarian, and Jewish communities, but, since the 1950s, demographic shifts have changed the city into a relatively segregated urban enclave of middle and lower income African Americans and newer immigrants, many of whom arrive from Latin America. Italians are scattered throughout the city, but a distinct Italian community is centered in the Chambersburg neighborhood, in South Trenton. This community has been in decline since the 1970s, largely due to economic and social shifts to the suburbs surrounding the city. Today Chambersburg has a large Latino community. Many of the Latino immigrants are from Mexico, Guatemala and Nicaragua. There is also a significant and growing Asian community in the Chambersburg neighborhood primarily made up of Burmese and Bhutanese/Nepali refugees.

The North Ward, once a mecca for the city's middle class, is now one of the most economically distressed, torn apart by race riots following the assassination of Martin Luther King Jr. in 1968. Nonetheless, the area still retains many important architectural and historic sites. North Trenton still has a large Polish-American neighborhood that borders Lawrence Township, many of whom attend St. Hedwig's Roman Catholic Church on Brunswick Avenue. St. Hedwig's church was built in 1904 by Polish immigrants, many of whose families still attend the church. North Trenton is also home to the historic Shiloh Baptist Church—one of the largest houses of worship in Trenton and the oldest African American church in the city, founded in 1888. The church is currently pastored by Rev. Darrell L. Armstrong, who carried the Olympic torch in 2002 for the Winter Olympics in Salt Lake City. Also located just at the southern tip of North Trenton is the city's Battle Monument, also known as "Five Points". It is a 150 ft (46 m) structure that marks the spot where George Washington's Continental Army launched the Battle of Trenton during the American Revolutionary War. It faces downtown Trenton and is a symbol of the city's historic past.

South Ward is a diverse neighborhood, home to many Latin American, Italian-American, and African American residents. The Chambersburg neighborhood was once noted in the region as a destination for its many Italian restaurants and pizzerias. With changing demographics, many of these businesses have either closed or relocated to suburban locations.

East Ward is the smallest neighborhood in Trenton and is home to the Trenton Transit Center and Trenton Central High School.

West Ward is the home of Trenton's more suburban neighborhoods.

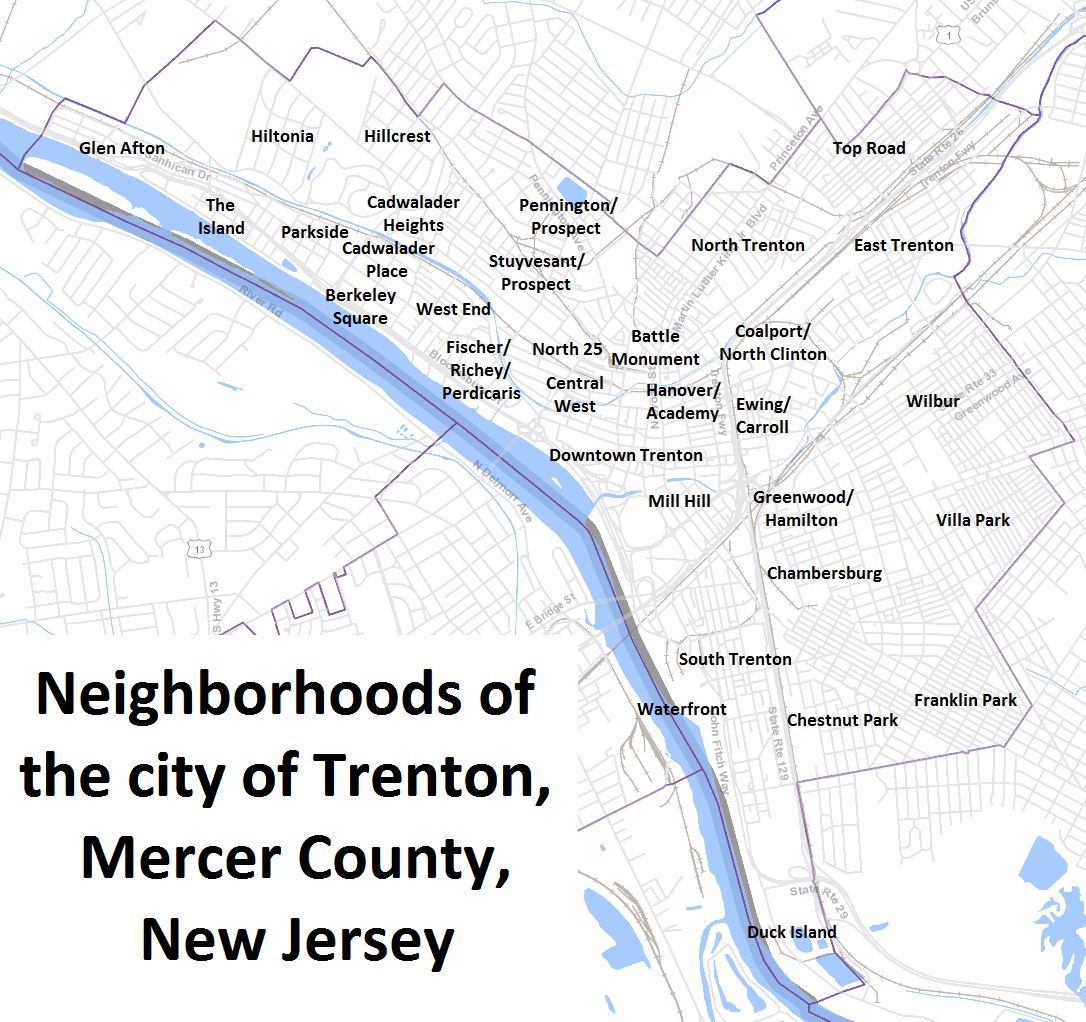
Map of neighborhoods in Trenton

Neighborhoods in the city include:

- Downtown Trenton
  - Hanover/Academy
  - Mill Hill
- East Trenton
  - Coalport/North Clinton
  - Ewing/Carroll
  - Greenwood/Hamilton
  - Villa Park
  - Wilbur
- Western Trenton (not the same as West Trenton, which is outside the city limits in Ewing)
  - Berkeley Square
  - Cadwalader Heights
  - Central West
  - Fisher/Richey/Perdicaris
  - Glen Afton
  - Hillcrest
  - Hiltonia
  - Parkside
  - Pennington/Prospect
  - Stuyvesant/Prospect
  - The Island
  - West End
- South Trenton
  - Chambersburg
  - Chestnut Park
  - Duck Island
  - Franklin Park
  - Lamberton/Waterfront
- North Trenton
  - Battle Monument (Five Points)
  - North 25
  - Top Road

== Climate ==
According to the Köppen climate classification, Trenton lies in the northern range of the humid subtropical (Cfa) zone, and precipitation fairly evenly distributed through the year. The Cfa climate is the result of adiabatic warming of the Appalachians, low altitude and proximity to the coast without being on the immediate edge for moderate temperatures.

Summers are hot and humid, with a July daily average of 76.3 °F (24.6 °C); temperatures reaching or exceeding 90 °F (32 °C) occur on 21.8 days. Episodes of extreme heat and humidity can occur with heat index values reaching 100 °F (38 °C). Extremes in air temperature have ranged from −14 °F (−26 °C) on February 9, 1934, up to 106 °F (41 °C) as recently as July 22, 2011. However, air temperatures reaching 0 °F (−18 °C) or 100 °F (38 °C) are uncommon.

Winters are cold and damp: the daily average temperature in January is 32.0 °F (0.0 °C), and temperatures at or below 10 °F (−12 °C) occur on 3.9 nights annually, while there are 17 days where the temperature fails to rise above freezing. Episodes of extreme cold and wind can occur with wind chill values below 0 °F (−18 °C), every few years. The plant hardiness zone at the Trenton Municipal Court is 7a with an average annual extreme minimum air temperature of 1.2 °F (−17.1 °C).

The average precipitation is 45.47 inches (115 cm) per year, which is fairly evenly distributed through the year. The driest month on average is February, with 2.63 in (67 mm) of precipitation on average, while the wettest month is July with 4.39 in (11 cm) of rainfall on average which corresponds with the annual peak in thunderstorm activity. The all-time single-day rainfall record is 7.25 in (18.4 cm) on September 16, 1999, during the passage of Hurricane Floyd. The all-time monthly rainfall record is 14.55 in (37.0 cm) in August 1955, due to the passage of Hurricane Connie and Hurricane Diane. The wettest year on record was 1996, when 67.90 in (172 cm) of precipitation fell. On the flip side, the driest month on record was October 1963, when only 0.05 in (0.1 cm) of rain was recorded. The 28.79 in (73 cm) of precipitation recorded in 1957 were the lowest ever for the city.

Snowfall can vary even more from year to year. The average seasonal (November–April) snowfall total is 24 to 30 inches (61 to 76 cm), but has ranged from as low as 2 in (5.1 cm) in the winter of 1918–1919 to as high as 76.5 in (194.3 cm) in 1995–1996, which included the greatest single-storm snowfall, the Blizzard of January 7–8, 1996, when 24.2 inches (61.5 cm) of snow fell. The average snowiest month is February which corresponds with the annual peak in nor'easter activity.

Climate data for Trenton, New Jersey (Trenton–Mercer Airport) 1991–2020 normals, extremes 1865–present
Month	Jan	Feb	Mar	Apr	May	Jun	Jul	Aug	Sep	Oct	Nov	Dec	Year
Record high °F (°C)	73 (23)	78 (26)	87 (31)	93 (34)	99 (37)	100 (38)	106 (41)	105 (41)	101 (38)	94 (34)	83 (28)	76 (24)	106 (41)
Mean maximum °F (°C)	62.7 (17.1)	62.7 (17.1)	74.2 (23.4)	83.0 (28.3)	88.6 (31.4)	93.4 (34.1)	96.3 (35.7)	94.3 (34.6)	89.7 (32.1)	81.4 (27.4)	72.0 (22.2)	64.2 (17.9)	97.2 (36.2)
Mean daily maximum °F (°C)	39.7 (4.3)	42.8 (6.0)	50.8 (10.4)	62.9 (17.2)	72.4 (22.4)	81.0 (27.2)	86.0 (30.0)	84.0 (28.9)	77.1 (25.1)	65.5 (18.6)	54.5 (12.5)	44.4 (6.9)	63.4 (17.4)
Daily mean °F (°C)	32.0 (0.0)	34.3 (1.3)	41.7 (5.4)	52.5 (11.4)	62.0 (16.7)	71.0 (21.7)	76.3 (24.6)	74.4 (23.6)	67.4 (19.7)	55.7 (13.2)	45.4 (7.4)	36.8 (2.7)	54.1 (12.3)
Mean daily minimum °F (°C)	24.3 (−4.3)	25.9 (−3.4)	32.7 (0.4)	42.1 (5.6)	51.6 (10.9)	60.9 (16.1)	66.6 (19.2)	64.8 (18.2)	57.7 (14.3)	45.9 (7.7)	36.3 (2.4)	29.3 (−1.5)	44.8 (7.1)
Mean minimum °F (°C)	7.2 (−13.8)	10.0 (−12.2)	17.9 (−7.8)	29.0 (−1.7)	37.7 (3.2)	48.3 (9.1)	57.0 (13.9)	54.4 (12.4)	43.2 (6.2)	31.6 (−0.2)	21.8 (−5.7)	14.8 (−9.6)	5.1 (−14.9)
Record low °F (°C)	−16 (−27)	−14 (−26)	0 (−18)	11 (−12)	31 (−1)	39 (4)	46 (8)	39 (4)	34 (1)	21 (−6)	9 (−13)	−8 (−22)	−16 (−27)
Average precipitation inches (mm)	3.29 (84)	2.63 (67)	3.97 (101)	3.63 (92)	3.99 (101)	4.25 (108)	4.39 (112)	4.22 (107)	4.09 (104)	3.79 (96)	3.18 (81)	4.04 (103)	45.47 (1,155)
Average snowfall inches (cm)	7.9 (20)	8.6 (22)	4.9 (12)	0.5 (1.3)	0.0 (0.0)	0.0 (0.0)	0.0 (0.0)	0.0 (0.0)	0.0 (0.0)	0.1 (0.25)	0.5 (1.3)	4.3 (11)	26.8 (67.85)
Average precipitation days (≥ 0.01 in)	10.1	10.1	11.0	11.5	12.0	11.9	10.8	10.0	8.6	10.0	8.5	11.0	125.5
Average snowy days (≥ 0.1 in)	4.6	4.3	2.6	0.3	0.0	0.0	0.0	0.0	0.0	0.0	0.3	2.3	14.4
Average relative humidity (%)	65.4	61.7	58.0	57.0	62.1	66.1	66.2	68.8	69.8	68.8	66.9	66.5	64.8
Average dew point °F (°C)	21.7 (−5.7)	22.8 (−5.1)	28.1 (−2.2)	37.7 (3.2)	48.7 (9.3)	59.4 (15.2)	63.9 (17.7)	63.5 (17.5)	57.0 (13.9)	45.6 (7.6)	35.9 (2.2)	26.5 (−3.1)	42.7 (5.9)
Mean monthly sunshine hours	163.1	169.7	207.4	227.2	248.1	262.8	269.2	252.5	215.0	201.5	149.3	140.1	2,505.9
Percentage possible sunshine	54	57	56	57	56	58	59	59	57	58	50	48	56
Source 1: NOAA (sun 1961–1981)
Source 2: PRISM Climate Group (humidity and dew point)

== Demographics ==
Historical population
Census	Pop.	Note	%±
1790	1,946		—
1810	3,000		—
1820	3,942		31.4%
1830	3,925		−0.4%
1840	4,035	*	2.8%
1850	6,461		60.1%
1860	17,228	*	166.6%
1870	22,874		32.8%
1880	29,910		30.8%
1890	57,458	*	92.1%
1900	73,307		27.6%
1910	96,815		32.1%
1920	119,289		23.2%
1930	123,356		3.4%
1940	124,697		1.1%
1950	128,009		2.7%
1960	114,167		−10.8%
1970	104,638		−8.3%
1980	92,124		−12.0%
1990	88,675		−3.7%
2000	85,403		−3.7%
2010	84,913		−0.6%
2020	90,871		7.0%
2025 (est.)	91,506		0.7%
Population sources: 1790–1920; 1840 1850–1870 1850; 1870 1880–1890 1910–1930; 1940–2000 2000; 2010 2020 * = Territory change in previous decade.

=== Racial and ethnic composition ===
Trenton, New Jersey – Racial and ethnic composition Note: the US Census treats Hispanic/Latino as an ethnic category. This table excludes Latinos from the racial categories and assigns them to a separate category. Hispanics/Latinos may be of any race.
Race / Ethnicity (NH = Non-Hispanic)	Pop 1990	Pop 2000	Pop 2010	Pop 2020	% 1990	% 2000	% 2010	% 2020
White alone (NH)	33,247	21,022	11,442	8,510	37.49%	24.62%	13.47%	9.36%
Black or African American alone (NH)	42,089	43,497	42,286	38,386	47.46%	50.93%	49.80%	42.24%
Native American or Alaska Native alone (NH)	189	164	219	144	0.21%	0.19%	0.26%	0.16%
Asian alone (NH)	474	684	923	592	0.53%	0.80%	1.09%	0.65%
Native Hawaiian or Pacific Islander alone (NH)	N/A	65	30	24	N/A	0.08%	0.04%	0.03%
Other Race alone (NH)	146	127	106	440	0.16%	0.15%	0.12%	0.48%
Mixed race or Multiracial (NH)	N/A	1,453	1,286	1,870	N/A	1.70%	1.51%	2.06%
Hispanic or Latino (any race)	12,530	18,391	28,621	40,905	14.13%	21.53%	33.71%	45.01%
Total	88,675	85,403	84,913	90,871	100.00%	100.00%	100.00%	100.00%

=== 2020 census ===
As of the 2020 census, Trenton had a population of 90,871. The median age was 33.3 years. 26.2% of residents were under the age of 18 and 9.8% of residents were 65 years of age or older. For every 100 females there were 104.9 males, and for every 100 females age 18 and over there were 105.6 males age 18 and over.

100.0% of residents lived in urban areas, while 0.0% lived in rural areas.

There were 30,139 households in Trenton, of which 38.4% had children under the age of 18 living in them. Of all households, 25.7% were married-couple households, 25.5% were households with a male householder and no spouse or partner present, and 39.9% were households with a female householder and no spouse or partner present. About 29.7% of all households were made up of individuals and 9.6% had someone living alone who was 65 years of age or older.

There were 34,322 housing units, of which 12.2% were vacant. The homeowner vacancy rate was 2.2% and the rental vacancy rate was 8.8%.

Racial composition as of the 2020 census
Race	Number	Percent
White	12,004	13.2%
Black or African American	39,703	43.7%
American Indian and Alaska Native	1,330	1.5%
Asian	630	0.7%
Native Hawaiian and Other Pacific Islander	92	0.1%
Some other race	27,228	30.0%
Two or more races	9,884	10.9%
Hispanic or Latino (of any race)	40,905	45.0%

==== Hispanic or Latino population ====
The Hispanic or Latino population in Trenton has grown significantly over the past few decades and now represents a substantial portion of the city's residents. According to the 2020 U.S. census, 45.01% of Trenton's population identified as Hispanic or Latino, up from 33.71% in 2010, 21.53% in 2000, and 14.13% in 1990. This demographic shift reflects a broader trend of increasing diversity in the city. The largest Hispanic or Latino ancestry group in Trenton is Guatemalan, accounting for 14.66% of the total Trenton population, followed by Puerto Rican (10.09%), Dominican (4.80%), and other Hispanic groups including Mexican, Honduran, and Ecuadorian communities. This growing population has had a notable cultural, social, and economic impact on the city, contributing to its identity. In recent years, for example, the annual festival celebrating Guatemala's independence on September 15 has attracted crowds in the thousands.

Hispanic or Latino Ancestry	Pop 2020	% 2020
Guatemalan	13,323	14.66%
Puerto Rican	9,167	10.09%
Other Hispanic, Latino, or Spanish	5,456	6.00%
Dominican	4,364	4.80%
Mexican	2,455	2.70%
Honduran	2,429	2.67%
Costa Rican	968	1.06%
Ecuadorian	948	1.04%
Other (less than 1%)	2,019	2.22%
Total Hispanic or Latino population	40,905	45.01%

=== 2010 census ===
The 2010 United States census counted 84,913 people, 28,578 households, and 17,747 families in the city. The population density was 11,101.9 per square mile (4,286.5/km^{2}). There were 33,035 housing units at an average density of 4,319.2 per square mile (1,667.7/km^{2}). The racial makeup was 26.56% (22,549) White, 52.01% (44,160) Black or African American, 0.70% (598) Native American, 1.19% (1,013) Asian, 0.13% (110) Pacific Islander, 15.31% (13,003) from other races, and 4.10% (3,480) from two or more races. Hispanic or Latino of any race were 33.71% (28,621) of the population.

Of the 28,578 households, 32.0% had children under the age of 18; 25.1% were married couples living together; 28.1% had a female householder with no husband present and 37.9% were non-families. Of all households, 30.8% were made up of individuals and 9.1% had someone living alone who was 65 years of age or older. The average household size was 2.79 and the average family size was 3.40.

25.1% of the population were under the age of 18, 11.0% from 18 to 24, 32.5% from 25 to 44, 22.6% from 45 to 64, and 8.8% who were 65 years of age or older. The median age was 32.6 years. For every 100 females, the population had 106.5 males. For every 100 females ages 18 and older there were 107.2 males.

The Census Bureau's 2006–2010 American Community Survey showed that (in 2010 inflation-adjusted dollars) median household income was $36,601 (with a margin of error of +/− $1,485) and the median family income was $41,491 (+/− $2,778). Males had a median income of $29,884 (+/− $1,715) versus $31,319 (+/− $2,398) for females. The per capita income for the city was $17,400 (+/− $571). About 22.4% of families and 24.5% of the population were below the poverty line, including 36.3% of those under age 18 and 17.5% of those age 65 or over.

== Economy ==
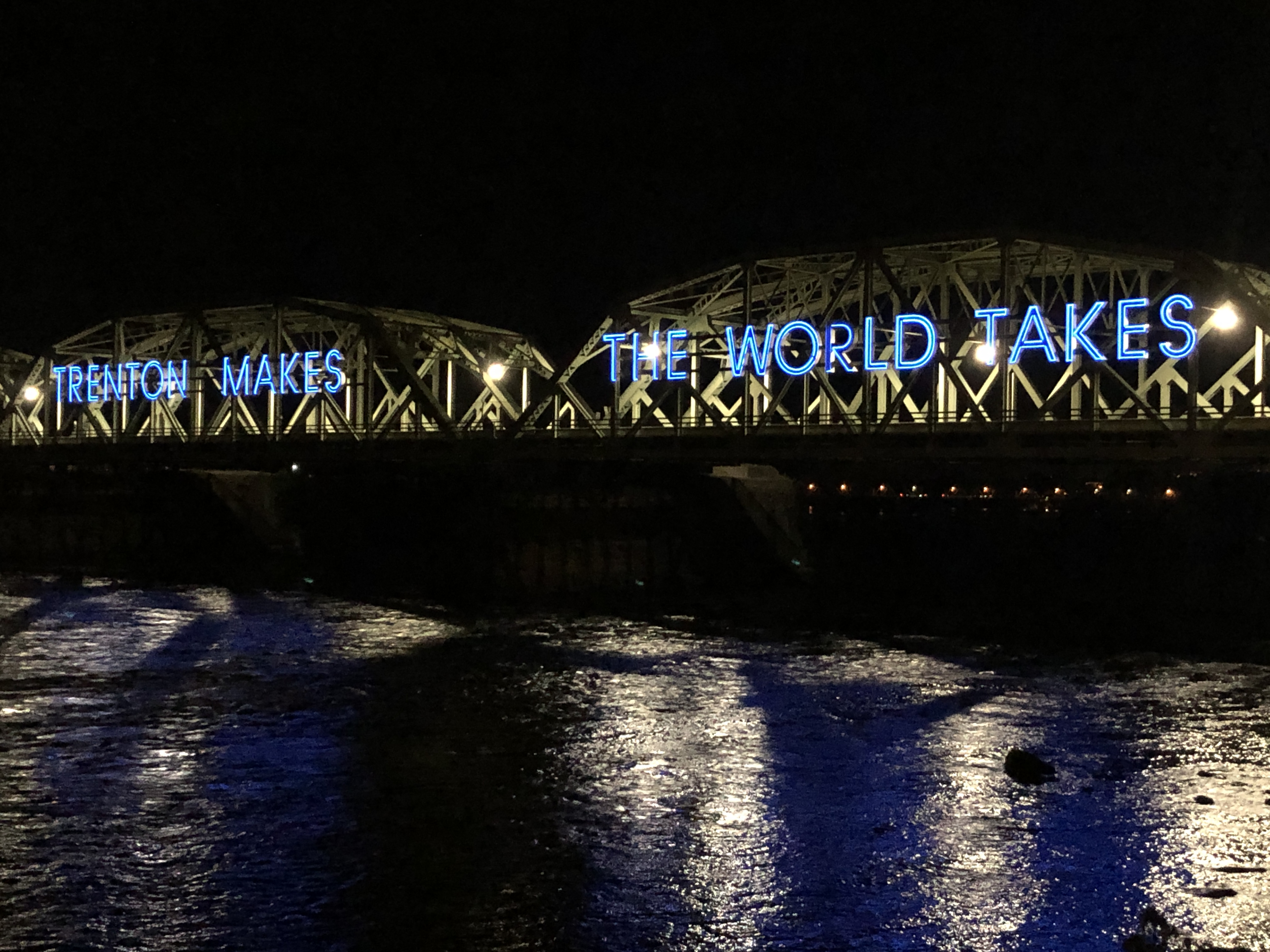
The Lower Trenton Bridge, often referred to as the "Trenton Makes Bridge" by locals

Trenton was a major manufacturing center in the late 19th and early 20th centuries. One relic of that era is the slogan "Trenton Makes, The World Takes", which is displayed on the Lower Free Bridge (just north of the Trenton–Morrisville Toll Bridge). The city adopted the slogan in 1917 to represent Trenton's then-leading role as a major manufacturing center for rubber, wire rope, ceramics and cigars. It was home to American Standard's largest plumbing fixture manufacturing facility.

Along with many other United States cities in the 1970s, Trenton fell on hard times when manufacturing and industrial jobs declined. Concurrently, state government agencies began leasing office space in the surrounding suburbs. State government leaders (particularly governors William Cahill and Brendan Byrne) attempted to revitalize the downtown area by making it the center of state government. Between 1982 and 1992, more than a dozen office buildings were constructed primarily by the state to house state offices. Today, Trenton's biggest employer is still the state of New Jersey. Each weekday, 20,000 state workers commute into the city from the surrounding suburbs.

Notable businesses of the thousands based in Trenton include Italian Peoples Bakery, a wholesale and retail bakery established in 1936. De Lorenzo's Tomato Pies and Papa's Tomato Pies were also fixtures of the city for many years, though both have since relocated.

=== Urban Enterprise Zone ===
Portions of Trenton are part of an Urban Enterprise Zone. The city was selected in 1983 as one of the initial group of 10 zones chosen to participate in the program. In addition to other benefits to encourage employment within the Zone, shoppers can take advantage of a reduced 3.3125% sales tax rate (half of the 6 5/8% rate charged statewide) at eligible merchants. Established in January 1986, the city's Urban Enterprise Zone status expires in December 2023.

The UEZ program in Trenton and four other original UEZ cities had been allowed to lapse as of January 1, 2017, after Governor Chris Christie, who called the program an "abject failure", vetoed a compromise bill that would have extended the status for two years. In May 2018, Governor Phil Murphy signed a law that reinstated the program in these five cities and extended the expiration date in other zones.

In 2018, the city had an average property tax bill of $3,274, the lowest in the county, compared to an average bill of $8,292 in Mercer County and $8,767 statewide. The city had the sixth-highest property tax rate in New Jersey, with an equalized rate of 5.264% in 2020, compared to 2.760% in the county as a whole and a statewide average of 2.279%.

== Landmarks ==
- New Jersey State Museum – Combines a collection of archaeology and ethnography, fine art, cultural history and natural history.
- New Jersey State House was originally constructed by Jonathan Doane in 1792, with major additions made in 1845, 1865 and 1871.
- New Jersey State Library serves as a central resource for libraries across the state as well as serving the state legislature and government.
- Trenton City Museum – Housed in the Italianate-style 1848 Ellarslie Mansion since 1978, the museum features artworks and other materials related to the city's history.
- Trenton War Memorial – Completed in 1932 as a memorial to the war dead from Mercer County during World War I and owned and operated by the State of New Jersey, the building is home to a theater with 1,800 seats that reopened in 1999 after an extensive, five-year-long renovation project.
- Old Barracks – Dating back to 1758 and the French and Indian War, the Barracks were constructed as a place to house British troops in lieu of housing the soldiers in the homes of area residents. The site was used by both the Continental Army and British forces during the Revolutionary War and stands as the last remaining colonial barracks in the state.
- Trenton Battle Monument – Located in the heart of the Five Points neighborhood, the monument was built to commemorate the Continental Army's victory in the December 26, 1776, Battle of Trenton. The monument was designed by John H. Duncan and features a statue of George Washington atop a pedestal that stands on a granite column 148 feet (45 m) in height.
- Trenton City Hall – The building was constructed based on a 1907 design by architect Spencer Roberts and opened to the public in 1910. The council chambers stand two stories high and features a mural by Everett Shinn that highlights Trenton's industrial history.
- William Trent House – Constructed in 1719 by William Trent, who the following year laid out what would become the city of Trenton, the house was owned by Governor Lewis Morris, who used the house as his official residence in the 1740s. Governor Philemon Dickerson used the home as his official residence in the 1830s, as did Rodman M. Price in the 1850s.
- Adams and Sickles Building (added January 31, 1980, as #80002498) is a focal point for West End neighborhood, and is remembered for its soda fountain and corner druggist.
- Friends Burying Ground, adjacent to the Trenton Friends Meeting House, is the burial site of several national and state political figures prominent in the city's early history.
- Trenton Friends Meeting House (added April 30, 2008, as #08000362), dating back to 1739, it was occupied by the British Dragoons in 1776 and by the Continental Army later in the Revolutionary War.
- Carver Center – formerly the Sunlight Elks Lodge, it was named after George Washington Carver, African-American agricultural scientist and inventor. The building was added to the National Register of Historic Places for its significance in ethnic heritage - Black, from 1922 to 1975.
- Old Masonic Temple - 1793 historic building put on the National Register of Historic Places as a contributing property to the State House Historic District.
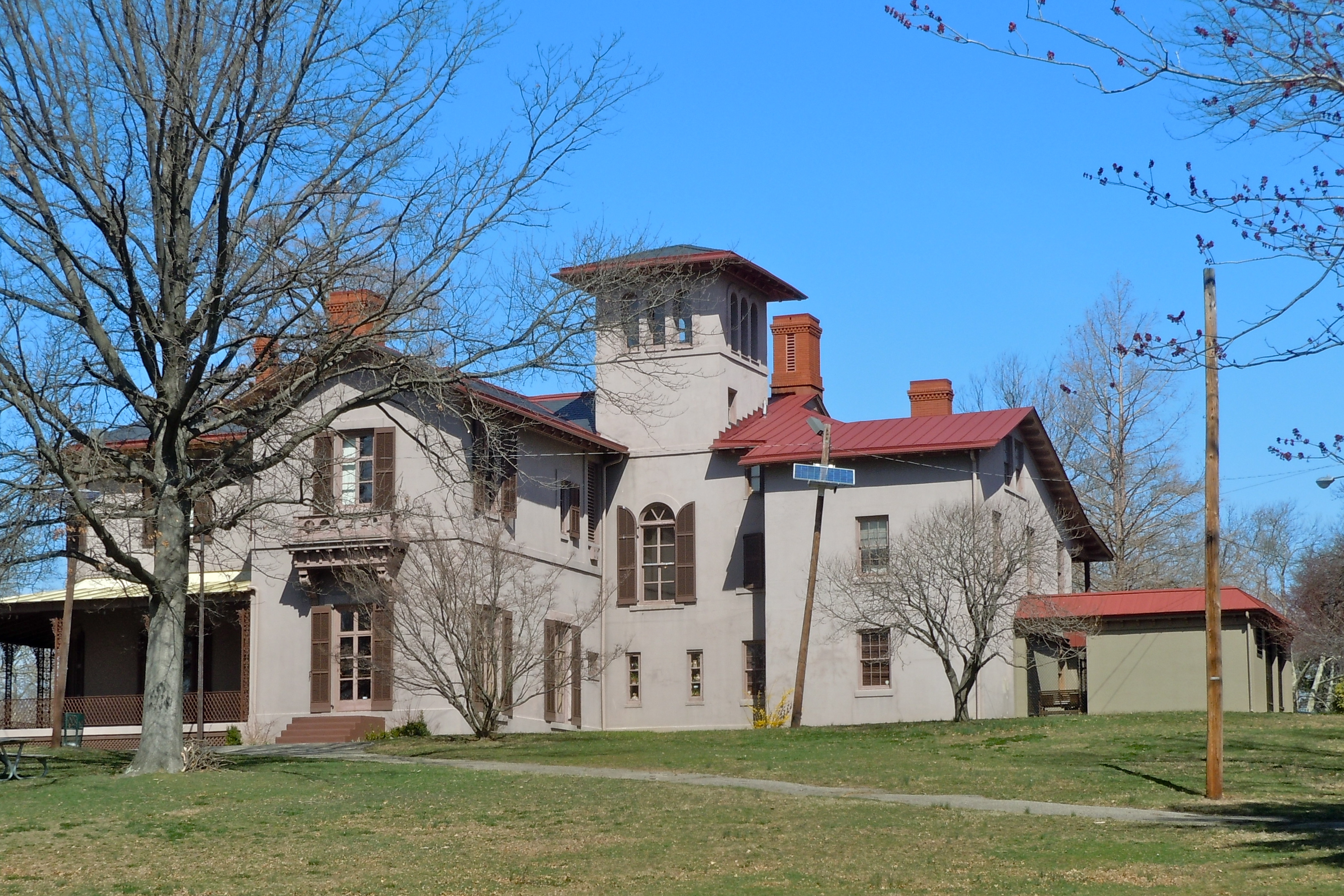
The Trenton City Museum, located at the Ellarslie Mansion in Cadwalader Park

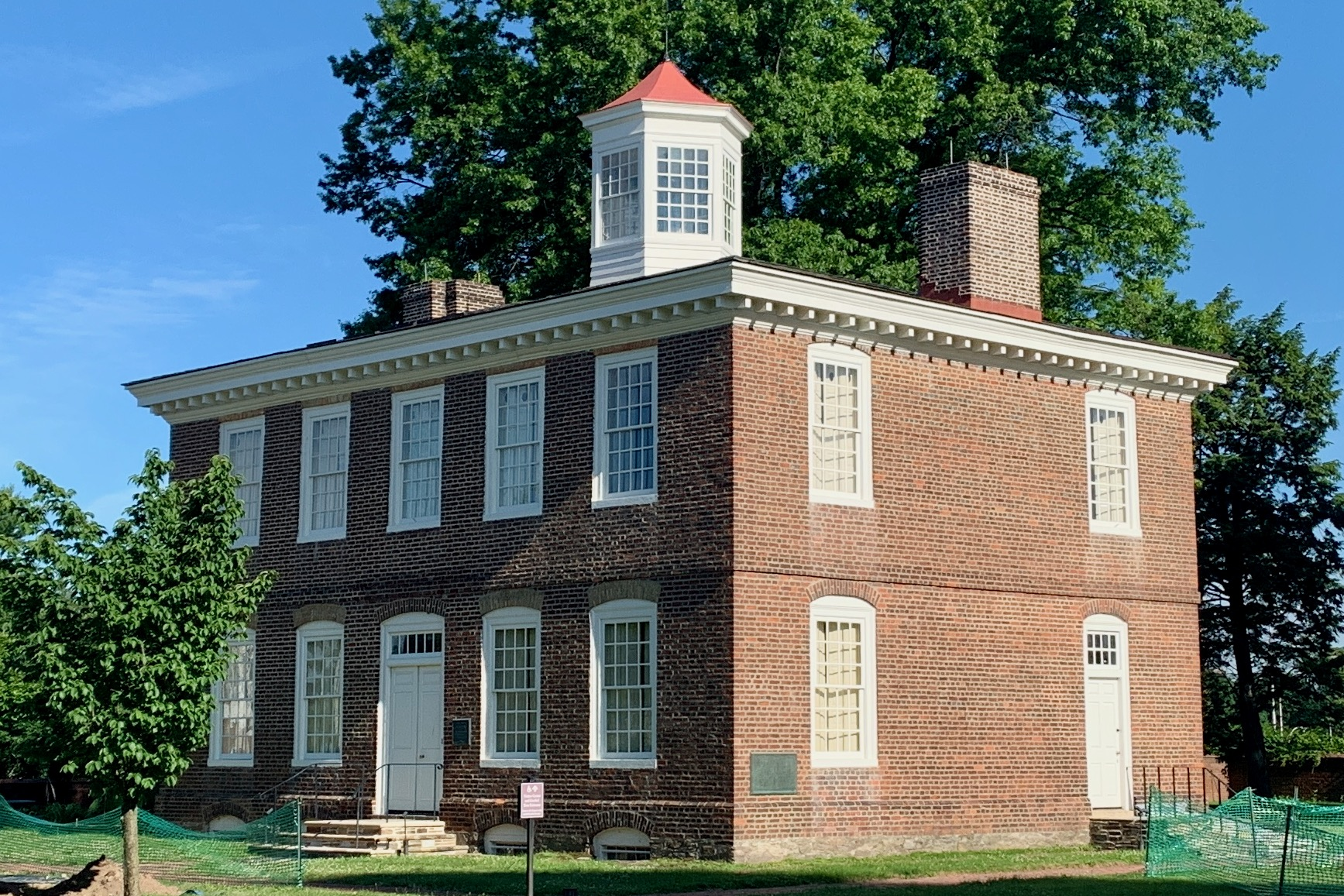
William Trent House

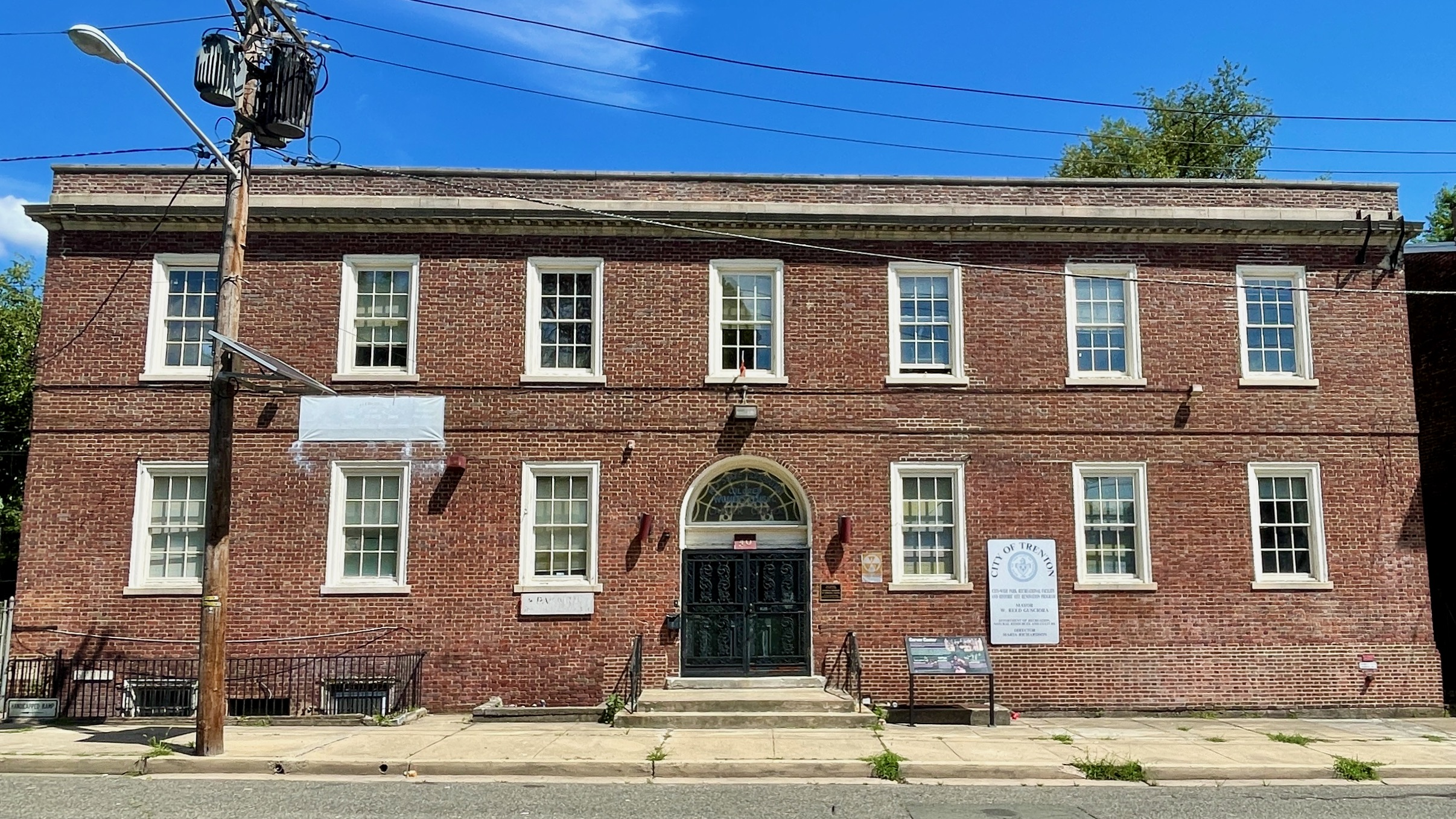
Carver Center

== Sports ==
Because of Trenton's nearly equal distance between New York City and Philadelphia, two of the nation's largest cities, and because most homes in Mercer County receive network broadcasts from both cities, locals are sharply divided in fan loyalty between both cities. It is common to find fans of the Philadelphia Phillies, Eagles, 76ers, Union, and/or Flyers cheering (and arguing) alongside fans of the New York Yankees, Mets, Nets, Knicks, Rangers, Islanders, Jets, Red Bulls, Giants, and/or the New Jersey Devils.

Between 1948 and 1979, Trenton Speedway, located in adjacent Hamilton Township, hosted world class auto racing. Drivers such as Jim Clark, A. J. Foyt, Mario Andretti, Al Unser, Bobby Unser, Richard Petty and Bobby Allison raced on the 1-mile (1.6 km) asphalt oval and then reconfigured 1 1/2-mile (2.4 km) race track. The speedway, which closed in 1980, was part of the larger New Jersey State Fairgrounds complex, which also closed in 1983. The former site of the speedway and fairgrounds is now the Grounds for Sculpture.

=== Teams ===
==== Current ====
Team	League	Venue	Established
Trenton Thunder	MLB Draft League	Trenton Thunder Ballpark	1994
Trenton Ironhawks	ECHL	CURE Insurance Arena	2026

The Trenton Thunder, a minor league team owned by Joe Plumeri, plays at 6,341-seat Trenton Thunder Ballpark, the stadium which Plumeri had previously named after his father in 1999. The team was previously affiliated with the New York Yankees, Boston Red Sox, Detroit Tigers, and, before moving to Trenton, the Chicago White Sox, but became an unaffiliated collegiate summer baseball team of the MLB Draft League beginning in 2021.

==== Former ====
Team	League	Venue	Years	Ref
Trentonians	Interstate Association (1883); Eastern League (1884–85)	Trenton Base Ball Grounds (1883); East State Street Grounds (1884–85)	1883–85	
Cuban Giants	Negro Leagues	[data missing]	1885–90	
Trenton Tigers	Tri-State League	[data missing]	1907–14	
Trenton Giants	New York–Penn League (1936–37); Eastern League (1938); Interstate League (1939–50)	[data missing]	1936–50	
Trenton Titans	ECHL	CURE Insurance Arena	1999–2013	
Trenton Lightning	IPFL	CURE Insurance Arena	2000–01	
Trenton Steel	SIFL	CURE Insurance Arena	2010–11	
Trenton Freedom	PIFL	CURE Insurance Arena	2013–15	

== Parks and recreation ==
- Cadwalader Park – Trenton's largest city park, covering 109.5 acres (44.3 ha), was designed by landscape architect Frederick Law Olmsted, who is most famous for designing New York City's Central Park.

== Government ==
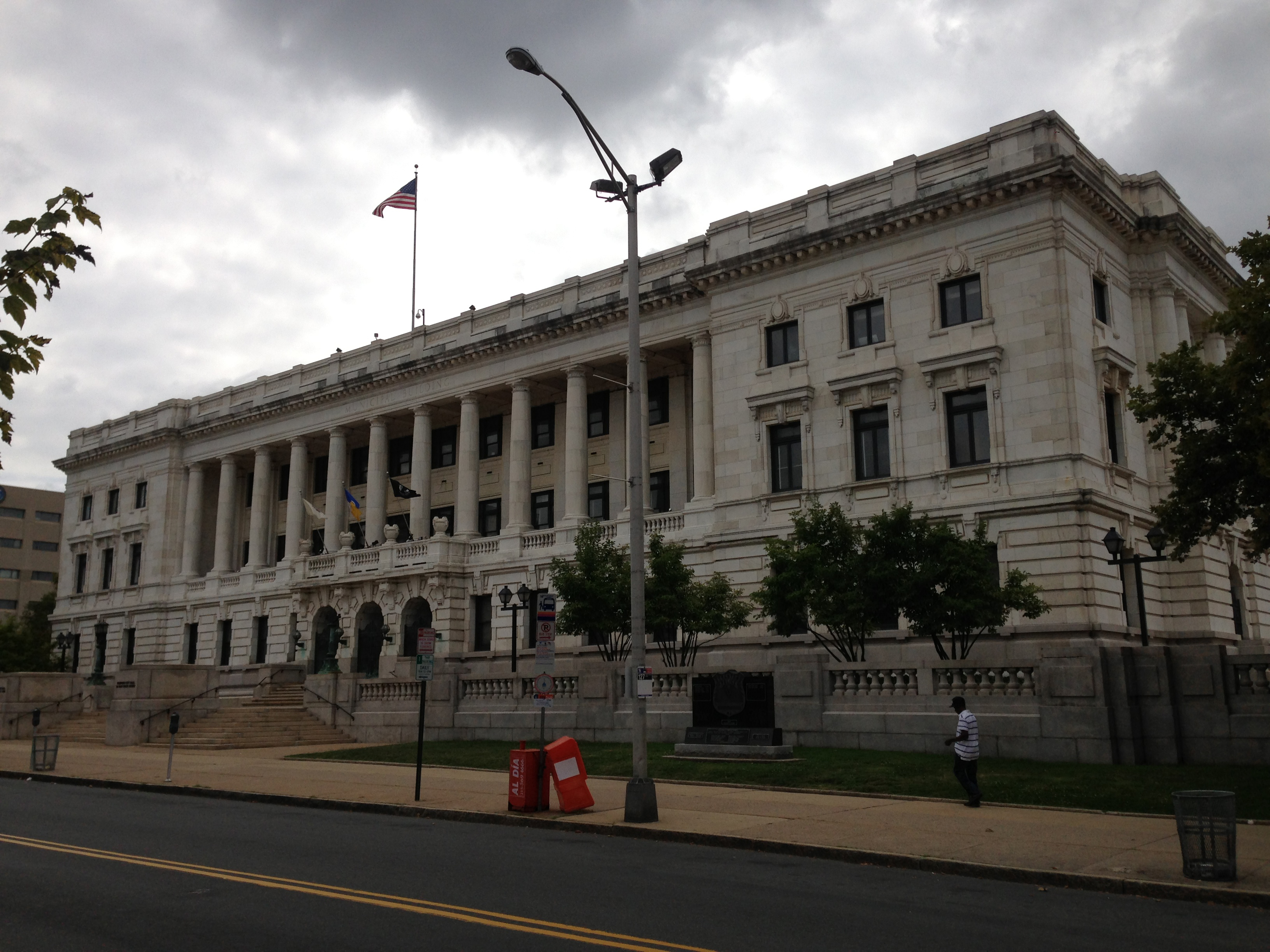
Trenton City Hall, the seat of local government

=== Local government ===
Trenton is governed within the Faulkner Act, formally known as the Optional Municipal Charter Law, under the Mayor-Council system of municipal government, one of 79 municipalities (of the 564) statewide that use this form of government. The governing body is comprised of a mayor and a seven-member city council. Three city council members are elected at-large, and four come from each of four wards. The mayor and council members are elected concurrently on a non-partisan basis to four-year terms of office as part of the November general election.

In April 1887, The New York Times identified alderman-elect Alexander Weber as the first person of color to hold public office in the city of Trenton.

In October 2020, the city council overrode a mayoral veto and shifted municipal elections from May to November, with proponents citing the increased turnout and savings to the city of $180,000 in each election cycle. The mayor and members of council all had their term-end dates extended by six months and moved to December 31 from June 30, 2022. The city retained a provision that would have a December runoff in the event that the candidate with the most votes does not obtain a majority.

As of 2023, the mayor of Trenton is Reed Gusciora, whose term of office ends December 31, 2026. Members of the city council are Jasi Edwards (at-large), Crystal Feliciano (at-large), Teska Frisby (West Ward), Yazminelly Gonzalez (at-large), Joseph A. Harrison (East Ward), Jenna Figueroa Kettenburg (South Ward) and Jennifer Williams (North Ward).

As they had not exceeded the minimum of 50 percent in the November 2022 general election, a runoff was held in December for the seats in the North and South Wards. Jennifer Williams won the North seat by a single vote against Algernon Ward, which made Williams the first transgender individual to be elected to a city council position in New Jersey history as well as being the first LGBTQ+ city council member in Trenton history. Jenna Figueroa Kettenburg won the South ward seat, defeating Damian G. Malave who had been ahead on Election Day but short of the cutoff, while a January 2023 runoff had Jasi Edwards, Crystal Feliciano and Yazminelly Gonzalez winning the three at-large seats.

In February 2023, Judge William Anklowitz of the New Jersey Superior Court heard a case for election challenges in the North Ward runoff election for both candidates Algernon Ward and Jennifer Williams. Three of the ballots Ward contested were all rejected because they were mail-in ballots that were returned without the required inner envelope. The other rejection Ward challenged was a case involving a cure letter that a voter sent to the wrong place, leading to it being not counted. Williams contested one ballot that was not counted due to it having both a vote for Ward and for Williams. Judge Anklowitz determined that the slash through Ward's vote signaled the voter's intention to vote for Williams and thus determined the vote should have been counted. These election challenges were heard following a recount that was held that did not change the outcome of the vote. Jennifer Williams thus remained to hold her seat on Trenton City Council for the North Ward seat.

==== Mayor's conviction and removal from office ====
On February 7, 2014, Tony F. Mack and his brother, Raphiel, were convicted by a federal jury of bribery, fraud and extortion, based on the details of their participation in a scheme to take money in exchange for helping get approvals to develop a downtown parking garage as part of a sting operation by law enforcement. Days after the conviction, the office of the New Jersey Attorney General filed motions to have Mack removed from office, as state law requires the removal of elected officials after convictions for corruption. Initially, Mack fought the removal of him from the office but on February 26, a superior court judge ordered his removal and any actions taken by Mack between February 7 and February 26 could have been reversed by Muschal. Previously, Mack's housing director quit after it was learned he had a theft conviction. His chief of staff was arrested trying to buy heroin. His half-brother, whose authority he elevated at the city water plant, was arrested on charges of stealing. His law director resigned after arguing with Mack over complying with open-records laws and potential violations of laws prohibiting city contracts to big campaign donors.

From February 7 to July 1, 2014, the acting mayor was George Muschal who retroactively assumed the office on that date due to Mack's felony conviction, who had taken office on July 1, 2010. Muschal, who was council president, was selected by the city council to serve as the interim mayor to finish the term.

=== Federal, state, and county representation ===
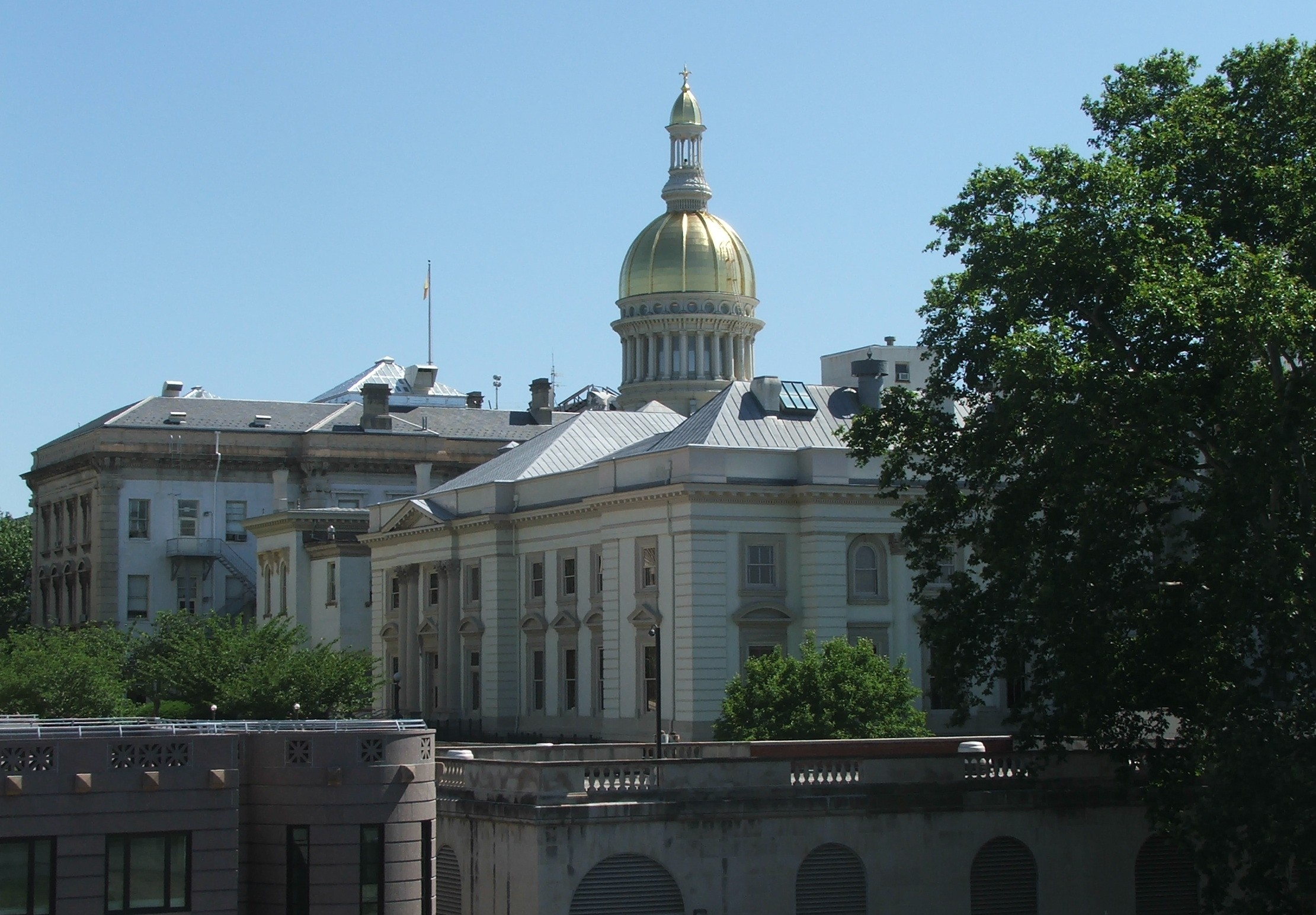
The New Jersey State House in Trenton

Trenton is located in the 12th Congressional District and is part of New Jersey's 15th state legislative district.

For the 119th United States Congress, New Jersey's 12th congressional district is represented by Bonnie Watson Coleman (D, Ewing Township). New Jersey is represented in the United States Senate by Democrats Cory Booker (Newark, term ends 2027) and Andy Kim (Moorestown, term ends 2031).

For the 2026–2027 session, the 15th legislative district of the New Jersey Legislature is represented in the State Senate by Shirley Turner (D, Lawrence Township) and in the General Assembly by Verlina Reynolds-Jackson (D, Trenton) and Anthony Verrelli (D, Hopewell Township).

Mercer County is governed by a County Executive who oversees the day-to-day operations of the county and by a seven-member Board of County Commissioners that acts in a legislative capacity, setting policy. All officials are chosen at-large in partisan elections, with the executive serving a four-year term of office while the commissioners serve three-year terms of office on a staggered basis, with either two or three seats up for election each year as part of the November general election. As of 2025, the County Executive is Daniel R. Benson (D, Hamilton Township) whose term of office ends December 31, 2027. Mercer County's Commissioners are:

Lucylle R. S. Walter (D, Ewing Township, 2026), Chair John A. Cimino (D, Hamilton Township, 2026), Samuel T. Frisby Sr. (D, Trenton, 2027), Cathleen M. Lewis (D, Lawrence Township, 2025), Vice Chair Kristin L. McLaughlin (D, Hopewell Township, 2027), Nina D. Melker (D, Hamilton Township, 2025) and Terrance Stokes (D, Ewing Township, 2027).

Mercer County's constitutional officers are: Clerk Paula Sollami-Covello (D, Lawrence Township, 2025), Sheriff John A. Kemler (D, Hamilton Township, 2026) and Surrogate Diane Gerofsky (D, Lawrence Township, 2026).

=== Politics ===
As of March 2011, there were a total of 37,407 registered voters in Trenton, of which 16,819 (45.0%) were registered as Democrats, 1,328 (3.6%) were registered as Republicans and 19,248 (51.5%) were registered as Unaffiliated. There were 12 voters registered to other parties.

United States presidential election results for Trenton
Year	Republican		Democratic		Third party(ies)	
Year	No.	%	No.	%	No.	%
2024	3,117	16.66%	15,372	82.19%	215	1.15%
2020	2,443	11.16%	19,304	88.17%	146	0.67%
2016	1,715	7.72%	20,131	90.58%	379	1.71%
2012	1,528	6.17%	23,125	93.43%	97	0.39%
2008	2,157	8.34%	23,577	91.12%	141	0.54%
2004	3,791	16.87%	18,539	82.48%	146	0.65%

In the 2012 presidential election, Democrat Barack Obama received 93.4% of the vote (23,125 cast), ahead of Republican Mitt Romney with 6.2% (1,528 votes), and other candidates with 0.4% (97 votes), among the 27,831 ballots cast by the city's 40,362 registered voters (3,081 ballots were spoiled), for a turnout of 69.0%. In the 2008 presidential election, Democrat Barack Obama received 89.9% of the vote here (23,577 cast), ahead of Republican John McCain with 8.2% (2,157 votes) and other candidates with 0.5% (141 votes), among the 26,229 ballots cast by the city's 41,005 registered voters, for a turnout of 64.0%. The 2004, 2020, and 2024 presidential elections were the only elections where the Republican nominee obtained over 10.0% of the vote since at least 2004. Since at least the same year, George W. Bush in 2004 presidential election and Donald Trump in 2024 presidential election were the only Republicans to receive over 15.0% of the vote in Trenton.

Gubernatorial election results for Trenton
Year	Republican		Democratic		Third party(ies)	
Year	No.	%	No.	%	No.	%
2025	1,152	8.71%	11,963	90.44%	113	0.85%
2021	987	10.77%	8,120	88.59%	59	0.64%
2017	872	8.58%	9,128	89.76%	169	1.66%
2013	3,035	24.69%	9,179	74.68%	77	0.63%
2009	1,560	12.75%	10,235	83.65%	440	3.60%
2005	1,982	15.32%	10,484	81.04%	471	3.64%

In the 2013 gubernatorial election, Democrat Barbara Buono received 74.7% of the vote (9,179 cast), ahead of Republican Chris Christie with 24.7% (3,035 votes), and other candidates with 0.6% (77 votes), among the 11,884 ballots cast by the city's 38,452 registered voters (407 ballots were spoiled), for a turnout of 30.9%. In the 2009 gubernatorial election, Democrat Jon Corzine received 81.6% of the vote here (10,235 ballots cast), ahead of Republican Chris Christie with 12.4% (1,560 votes), Independent Chris Daggett with 2.4% (305 votes) and other candidates with 1.1% (135 votes), among the 12,537 ballots cast by the city's 38,345 registered voters, yielding a 32.7% turnout.

United States Senate election results for Trenton1
Year	Republican		Democratic		Third party(ies)	
Year	No.	%	No.	%	No.	%
2024	2,282	13.64%	13,844	82.75%	603	3.60%
2018	1,108	8.42%	11,608	88.21%	443	3.37%
2012	1,302	5.75%	21,040	92.95%	294	1.30%
2006	1,492	14.15%	8,770	83.18%	282	2.67%

United States Senate election results for Trenton2
Year	Republican		Democratic		Third party(ies)	
Year	No.	%	No.	%	No.	%
2020	2,008	9.45%	18,872	88.84%	362	1.70%
2014	694	6.48%	9,870	92.11%	152	1.42%
2013	561	6.88%	7,484	91.81%	107	1.31%
2008	1,972	9.16%	19,034	88.39%	528	2.45%

== Fire department ==
The city of Trenton is protected on a full-time basis by the city of Trenton Fire and Emergency Services Department (TFD), which has been a paid department since 1892 after having been originally established in 1747 as a volunteer fire department. The TFD operates out of seven fire stations and operates a fire apparatus fleet of 7 engine companies, 3 ladder companies and one rescue company, along with one HAZMAT unit, an air cascade unit, a mobile command unit, a foam unit, one fireboat, and numerous special, support and reserve units, under the command of two battalion chiefs and a deputy chief/tour commander each shift.

== Education ==
=== Colleges and universities ===
Trenton is the home of two post-secondary institutions: Thomas Edison State University, serving adult students around the nation and worldwide and Mercer County Community College's James Kerney Campus.

The College of New Jersey, formerly named Trenton State College, was founded in Trenton in 1855 and is now located in nearby Ewing Township. Rider University was founded in Trenton in 1865 as The Trenton Business College. In 1959, Rider moved to its current location in nearby Lawrence Township.

=== Public schools ===
The Trenton Public Schools serve students in pre-kindergarten through twelfth grade. The district is one of 31 former Abbott districts statewide that were established pursuant to the decision by the New Jersey Supreme Court in Abbott v. Burke which are now referred to as "SDA Districts" based on the requirement for the state to cover all costs for school building and renovation projects in these districts under the supervision of the New Jersey Schools Development Authority. The district's board of education, comprised of seven members, sets policy and oversees the fiscal and educational operation of the district through its superintendent administration. As a Type I school district, the board's trustees are appointed by the mayor to serve three-year terms of office on a staggered basis, with either two or three seats up for re-appointment each year. The board appoints a superintendent to oversee the district's day-to-day operations and a business administrator to supervise the business functions of the district. The school district has undergone a 'construction' renaissance throughout the district.

As of the 2022–23 school year, the district, comprised of 25 schools, had an enrollment of 14,852 students and 966.4 classroom teachers (on an FTE basis), for a student–teacher ratio of 15.4:1. The district includes 13 elementary schools, six intermediate schools, three middle schools, and three high schools. They are as follows:

Name	Grade(s)	Enrollment (2022–23)
Early Childhood Learning Center	Pre-Kindergarten	N/A
Benjamin C. Gregory Elementary School	K–3rd	269
Benjamin Franklin Elementary School	K–3rd	349
Cadwalader Elementary School	K–3rd	163
Carroll Robbins Elementary School	K–3rd	413
Darlene C. McKnight Elementary School	K–3rd	361
Dr. Crosby Copeland Elementary School	K–3rd	296
George Washington Elementary School	K–3rd	289
Gershom Mott Elementary School	K–3rd	357
Joseph Stokes Elementary School	K–3rd	306
Luis Muñoz-Rivera Elementary School	K–3rd	366
Patton J. Hill Elementary School	K–3rd	502
Paul Robeson Elementary School	K–3rd	341
William Harrison Elementary School	K–3rd	239
Battle Monument Intermediate School	4th–6th	460
Clara Parker Intermediate School	4th–6th	515
Hedgepeth-Williams Intermediate School	4th–6th	582
Joyce Kilmer Intermediate School	4th–6th	498
Thomas Jefferson Intermediate School	4th–6th	354
Ulysses S. Grant Intermediate School	4th–6th	542
Arthur J. Holland Middle School	7th–8th	513
Dr. MLK Jr. Middle School	7th–8th	568
Grace A. Dunn Middle School	7th–8th	670
Daylight/Twilight High School	7th–12th	479
Trenton's Ninth Grade Academy	9th	796
Trenton Central High School	9th–12th	2,255

Eighth-grade students from all of Mercer County are eligible to apply to attend the high school programs offered by the Mercer County Technical Schools, a county-wide vocational school district that offers full-time career and technical education at its Health Sciences Academy, STEM Academy and Academy of Culinary Arts, with no tuition charged to students for attendance.

Marie H. Katzenbach School for the Deaf (previously New Jersey School for the Deaf and New Jersey State Institution for the Deaf and Dumb), the statewide school for the deaf, opened in Trenton in 1883 and was there until 1923, when it moved to West Trenton.

==== Charter schools ====
Trenton is home to several charter schools, including Capital Preparatory Charter High School, Emily Fisher Charter School, Foundation Academy Charter School, International Charter School, Paul Robeson Charter School and Village Charter School.

The International Academy of Trenton, owned and monitored by the SABIS school network, became a charter school in 2014. On February 22, 2017, Trenton's mayor, Eric Jackson, visited the school when it opened its doors in the former Trenton Times building on 500 Perry Street, after completion of a $17 million renovation project. After receiving notice from the New Jersey Department of Education that the school's charter would not be renewed due to issues with academic performance and school management, the school closed its doors on June 30, 2018.

=== Private schools ===
Trenton Catholic Academy high school serves students in grades 9–12, while Trenton Catholic Academy grammar school serves students in Pre-K through 8th grade; both schools operate under the auspices of the Roman Catholic Diocese of Trenton.

Trenton is home to Al-Bayaan Academy, which opened for preschool students in September 2001 and added grades in subsequent years.

Trenton Community Music School is a not-for-profit community school of the arts. The school was founded by executive director Marcia Wood in 1997. The school operates at Blessed Sacrament Catholic Church and the Copeland Center for the Performing Arts.

== Crime ==
The Trenton Police Department was founded in 1792, when the city was incorporated. It works in conjunction with the Mercer County Sheriff's Office.

In 2005, there were 31 homicides in Trenton, which at that time was the largest number in a single year in the city's history. The city was named the 4th "Most Dangerous" in 2005 out of 129 cities with a population of 75,000 to 99,999 ranked nationwide in the 12th annual Morgan Quitno survey. In the 2006 survey, Trenton was ranked as the 14th most dangerous city overall out of 371 cities included nationwide in the Morgan Quitno survey, and was again named as the fourth most dangerous municipality of 126 cities in the 75,000–99,999 population range.

In September 2011, the city laid off 108 police officers due to budget cuts; this constituted almost one-third of the Trenton Police Department and required 30 senior officers to be sent out on patrols in lieu of supervisory duties.

In 2013, the city set a new record with 37 homicides. In 2014, there were 23 murders through the end of July and the city's homicide rate was on track to break the record set the previous year until an 81-day period when there were no murders in Trenton; the city ended the year with 34 murders. In 2020, the city surpassed the 2013 homicide number with a record 40 homicides. Recently Trenton has gone years without homicides like in 2022 recording 0 homicides. And recently Trenton has seen significant declines in crime and lots of reinvestment recently and the demolition or redevelopment of abandoned buildings has accelerated recently.

The New Jersey State Prison (formerly Trenton State Prison) has two maximum security units. It houses some of the state's most dangerous individuals, which included New Jersey's death row population until the state banned capital punishment in 2007.

In 2024, the City of Trenton and the Trenton Police Department were investigated by the United States Department of Justice and the NJ State Attorney’s Office. These agencies found that both entities “engage in a pattern or practice of misconduct that deprives people of their rights under the fourth amendment.”

== Transportation ==
=== Roads and highways ===
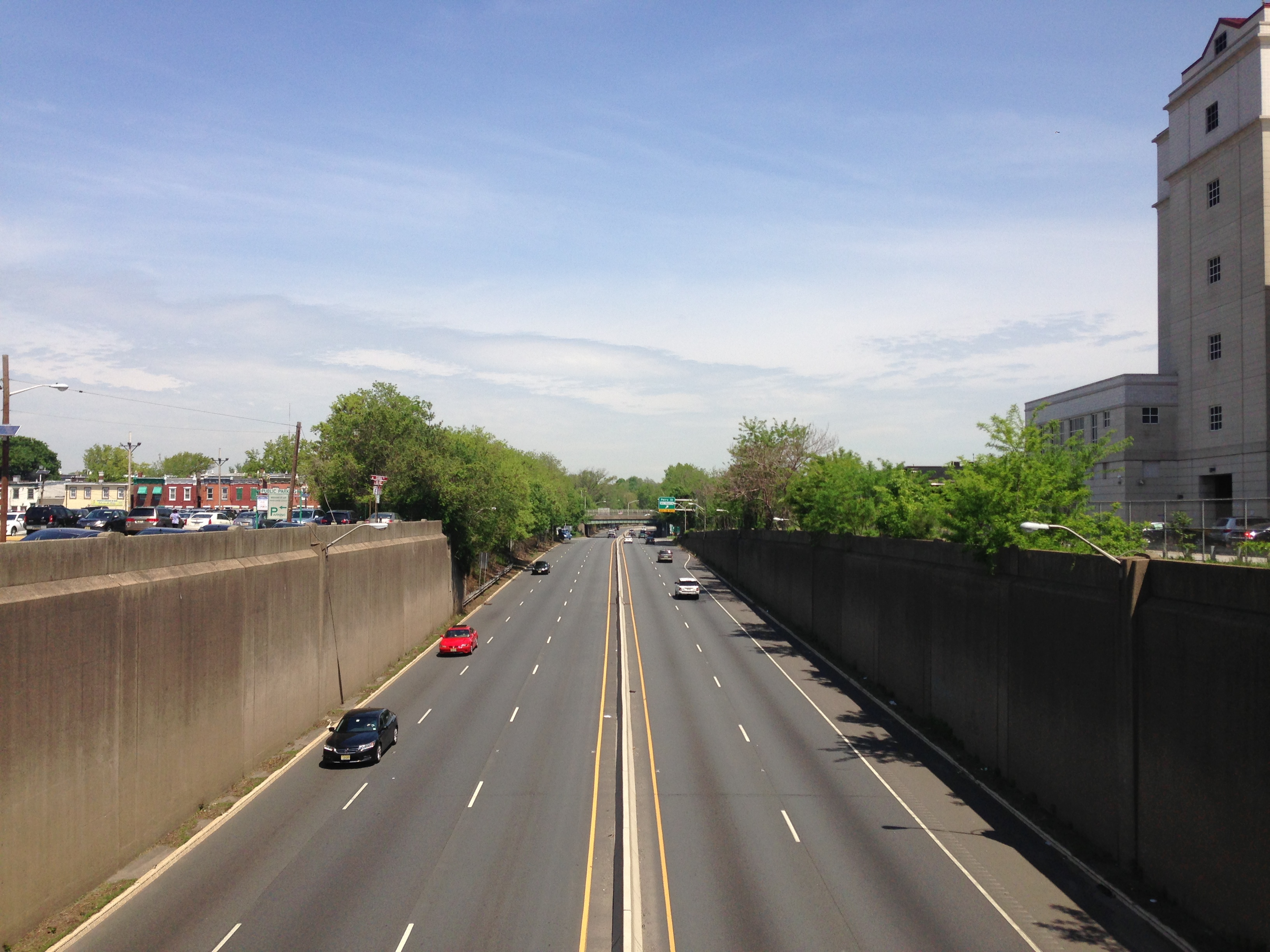
U.S. Route 1 through downtown Trenton, looking north from the East State Street overpass

As of May 2010, the city had a total of 168.80 miles (271.66 km) of roadways, of which 145.57 miles (234.27 km) were maintained by the municipality, 11.33 miles (18.23 km) by Mercer County, 10.92 miles (17.57 km) by the New Jersey Department of Transportation and 0.99 miles (1.59 km) by the Delaware River Joint Toll Bridge Commission.

Several highways pass through the city. These include the Trenton Freeway (part of U.S. Route 1) and the John Fitch Parkway, which is part of Route 29. Canal Boulevard, more commonly known as Route 129, connects U.S. Route 1 and Route 29 in South Trenton. U.S. Route 206, Route 31 and Route 33 also pass through the city via regular city streets (Broad Street/Brunswick Avenue/Princeton Avenue, Pennington Avenue, and Greenwood Avenue, respectively).

Route 29 connects the city to Interstate 295 and Interstate 195, the latter providing a connection to the New Jersey Turnpike (Interstate 95) at Exit 7A in Robbinsville Township, although the section near downtown is planned to be converted to an urban boulevard.

=== Public transportation ===
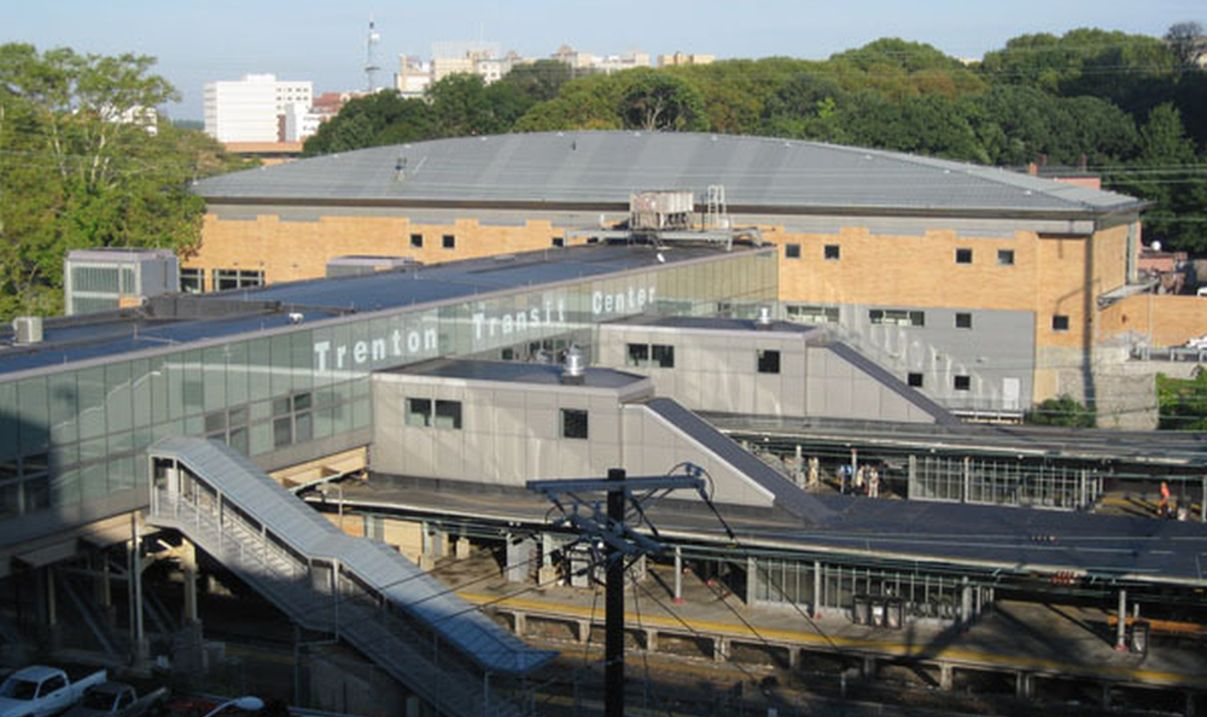
The Trenton Transit Center, which serves Amtrak, NJ Transit, and SEPTA

Public transportation within the city and its nearby suburbs is provided in the form of local bus routes run by NJ Transit. SEPTA provides bus service to adjacent Bucks County, Pennsylvania.

The Trenton Transit Center, located on the heavily traveled Northeast Corridor, serves as the northbound terminus for SEPTA's Trenton Line (local train service to Philadelphia) and southbound terminus for NJ Transit Rail's Northeast Corridor Line (local train service to New York Penn Station). The train station also serves as the northbound terminus for the River Line, a diesel light rail line that runs to Camden. Two additional River Line stops, Cass Street and Hamilton Avenue, are located within the city. Long-distance transportation is provided by Amtrak train service along the Northeast Corridor.

The closest commercial airport is Trenton–Mercer Airport in Ewing Township, about 8 miles (13 km) from the center of Trenton, which is served by Frontier Airlines. Nearby major airports are Newark Liberty International Airport and Philadelphia International Airport, located 55.2 miles (88.8 km) and 43.4 miles (69.8 km) away, respectively, and reachable by direct New Jersey Transit or Amtrak rail (to Newark) and by SEPTA Regional Rail (to Philadelphia).

NJ Transit Bus Operations provides bus service between Trenton and Philadelphia on the 409 route, with service to surrounding communities on the 600, 601, 603, 606, 607, 608, 609, 611 and 624 routes.

The Greater Mercer Transportation Management Association offers service on the Route 130 Connection between the Trenton Transit Center and the South Brunswick warehouse district with stops along the route including Hamilton train station, Hamilton Marketplace, Hightstown and East Windsor Town Center Plaza.

== Media ==
Trenton is served by two daily newspapers, The Times and The Trentonian, and a monthly advertising magazine, "The City" Trenton N.E.W.S.. Radio station WKXW and Top 40 WPST are also licensed to Trenton. Defunct periodicals include the Trenton True American. A local television station, WPHY-CD TV-25, serves the Trenton area.

Trenton is part of the Philadelphia television market but some local TV operators also carry stations serving the New York City market. While it is its own radio market, many Philadelphia and New York stations are easily receivable.

Trenton was the site of the studios of the former public television station New Jersey Network.

== Sister cities ==
- Jundiaí, Brazil
- Huế, Vietnam
- St Helier, Jersey, United Kingdom

== See also ==
- Relocation of the United States Government to Trenton
- USS Trenton, 4 ships

== Sources ==
- Franklin, Benjamin (January 10, 1764). "Post Office Commissions to Abraham Hunt, 10 January 1764 (and 13 October 1775)". Letter to "All to whom these Presents shall come". National Archives: Founders Online.
- Schuyler, Hamilton (1929). A History of Trenton, 1679–1929. Princeton, New Jersey: The Trenton Historical Society and Princeton University Press. OCLC 1435588192.

Preceded by Annapolis, Maryland	Capital of the United States of America; 1784–1785	Succeeded by New York City
