= Carver Center (Trenton, New Jersey) =

- U.S. National Register of Historic Places
- New Jersey Register of Historic Places
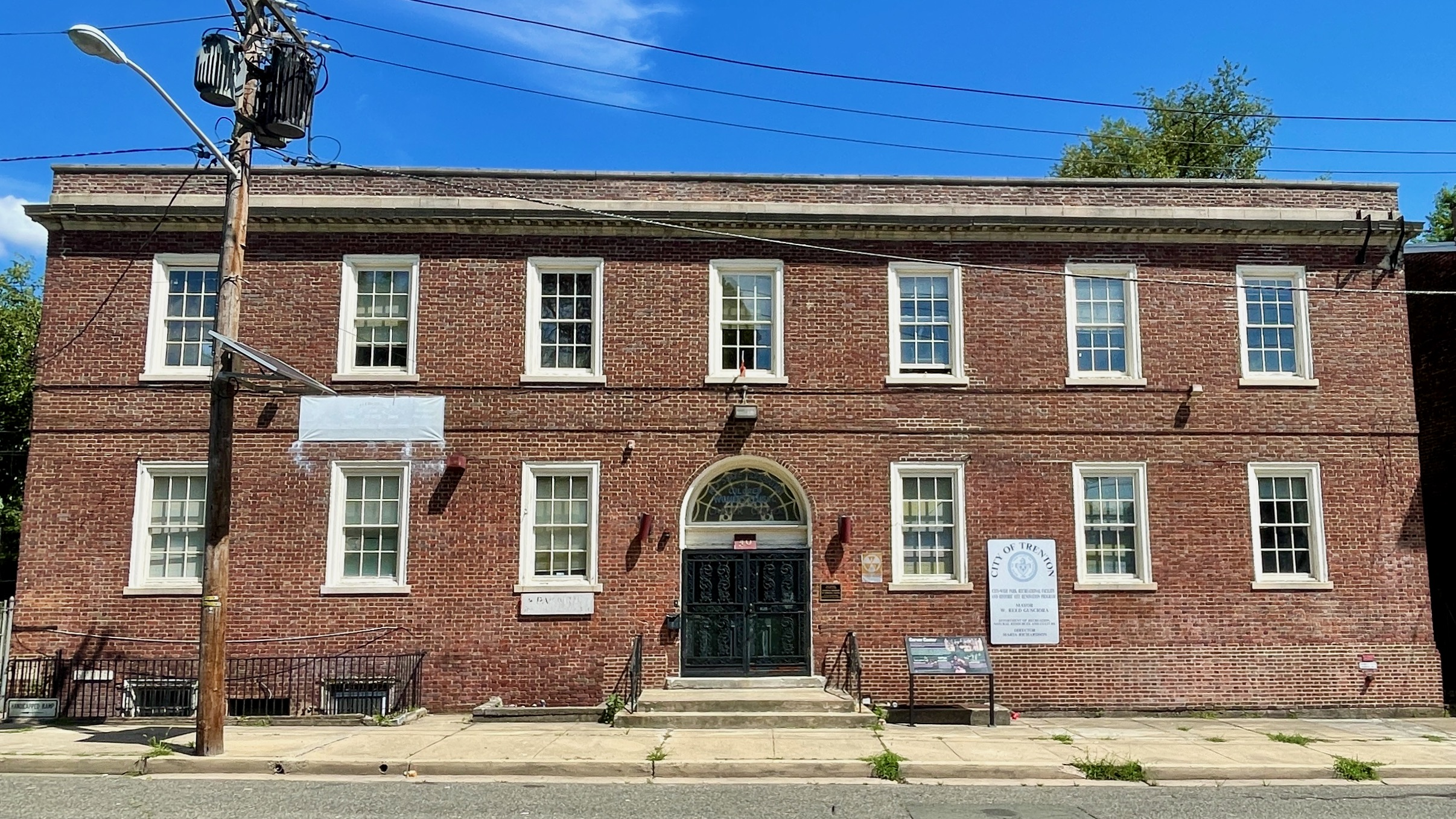

- Location within Mercer County, New Jersey Location within New Jersey Location within the United States
- Location: 40 Fowler Street; Trenton, New Jersey
- Coordinates: 40°13′29″N 74°46′7″W
- Architect: J. Osborne Hunt
- Architectural style: Colonial Revival
- NRHP reference No.: 100007871
- NJRHP No.: 1767

Significant dates
- Added to NRHP: July 7, 2022
- Designated NJRHP: May 18, 2022

The Carver Center, formerly known as the Sunlight Elks Lodge, is a historic Colonial Revival style brick building located at 40 Fowler Street in the City of Trenton in Mercer County, New Jersey. It was named after George Washington Carver, African-American agricultural scientist and inventor. The building was added to the National Register of Historic Places on July 7, 2022, for its significance in ethnic heritage.

== History and description ==
A brick auditorium, designed by Trenton architect J. Osborne Hunt, was built here first, from 1922 to 1923. Later, from 1927 to 1928, a two-story brick building, also designed by Hunt, was built here connected to the auditorium and facing Fowler Street. Both were funded by the local Sunlight Elks Lodge of the Improved Benevolent and Protective Order of Elks of the World, an African-American fraternal organization. The building was dedicated in February 1928 and described in a newspaper: "Trenton Sunlight Elks Have Finest Home in America." From 1941 to 1943, it was known as the Colonel Charles Young Soldiers Club, a recreation center for Black troops from Fort Dix. It was named after Charles Young, the first African-American to earn the rank of colonel in the Army. From 1943 to 1975, it was owned by the Trenton Y.M.C.A. and known as the Carver Center, named after George Washington Carver. The building was sold to the New Jersey State Federation of Colored Women's Clubs in 1975. They established the Carver Youth and Family Center in 1981. The city bought the building in 2021.

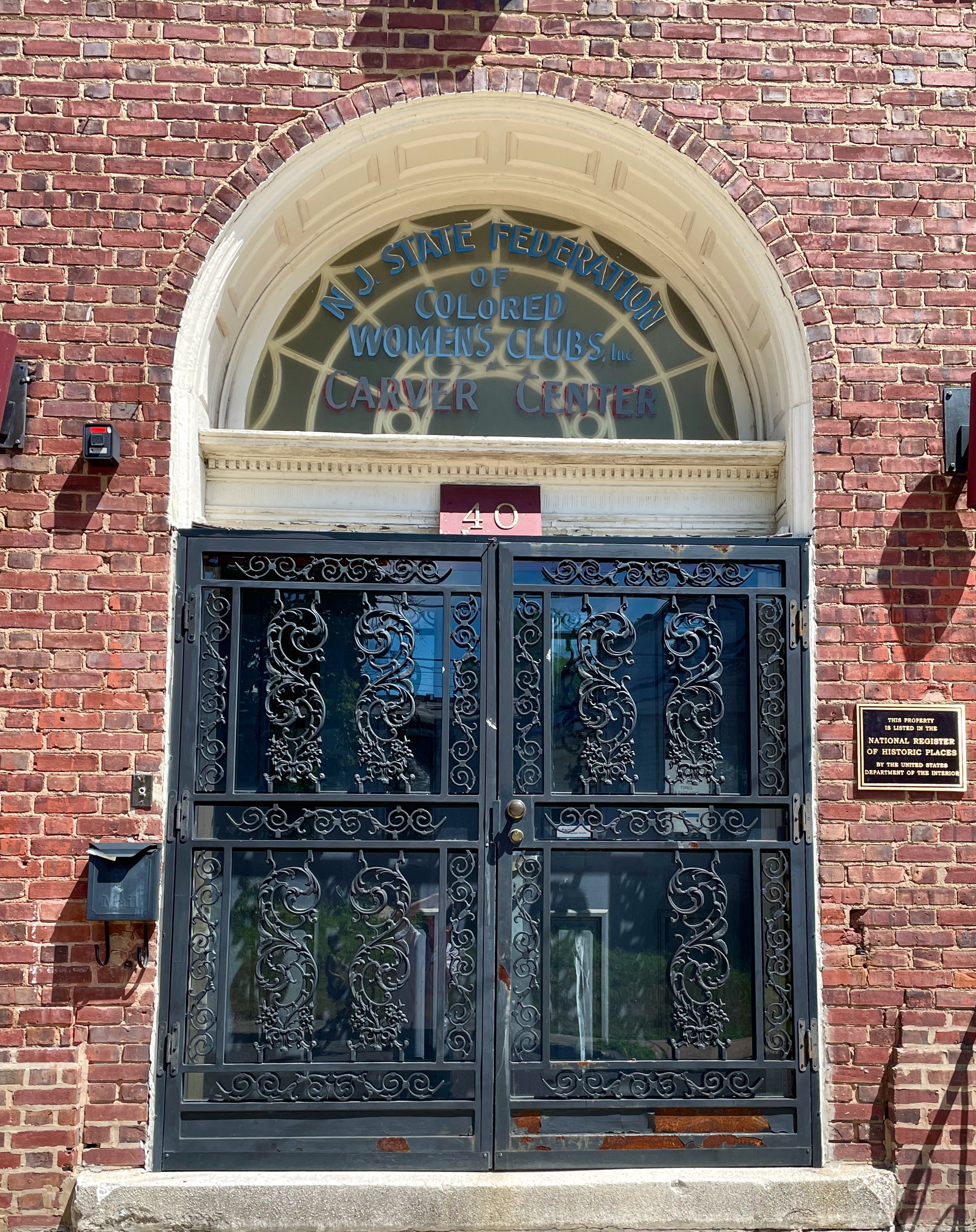
Entrance with NJ State Federation of Colored Women's Clubs signage and NRHP plaque

== See also ==
- National Register of Historic Places listings in Mercer County, New Jersey
