= Wilbur, Trenton, New Jersey =

Populated place in Mercer County, New Jersey, US

Wilbur
- Neighborhood of Trenton
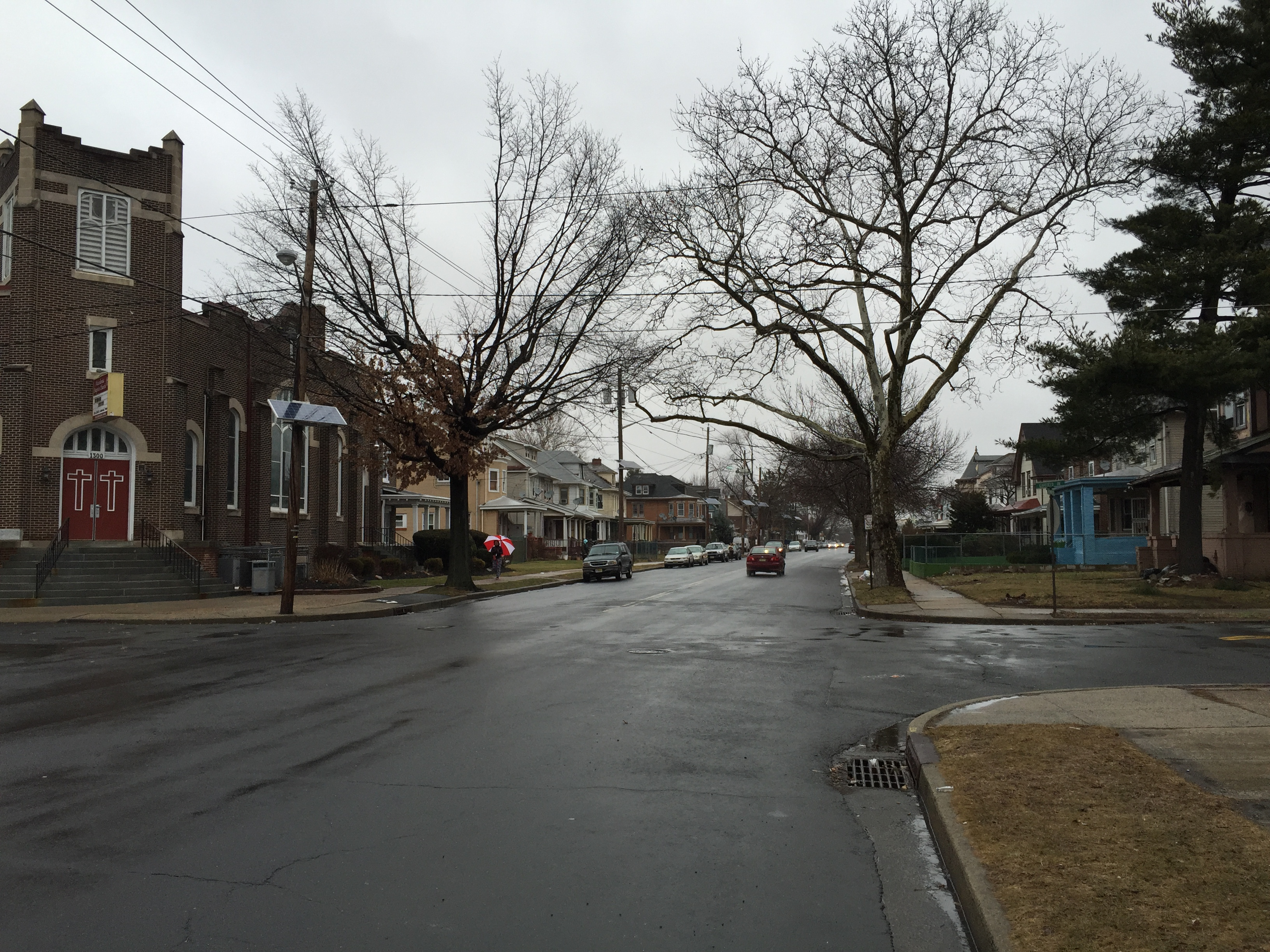
- Greenwood Avenue (New Jersey Route 33) in Wilbur

- Location of Wilbur in Mercer County Inset: Location of county within the state of New Jersey Wilbur (New Jersey) Wilbur (the United States)
- Coordinates: 40°13′31″N 74°44′28″W
- Country: United States
- State: New Jersey
- County: Mercer
- City: Trenton

Wilbur is a neighborhood located within the city of Trenton in Mercer County, in the U.S. state of New Jersey. It was an independent borough from 1891 to 1898.

Wilbur was incorporated as a borough by an act of the New Jersey Legislature on April 24, 1891, from portions of Hamilton Township, based on the results of a referendum held six days earlier. On February 28, 1898, the borough was annexed by Trenton as the 12th Ward.
