= George Washington's reception at Trenton =

Event on April 21, 1789

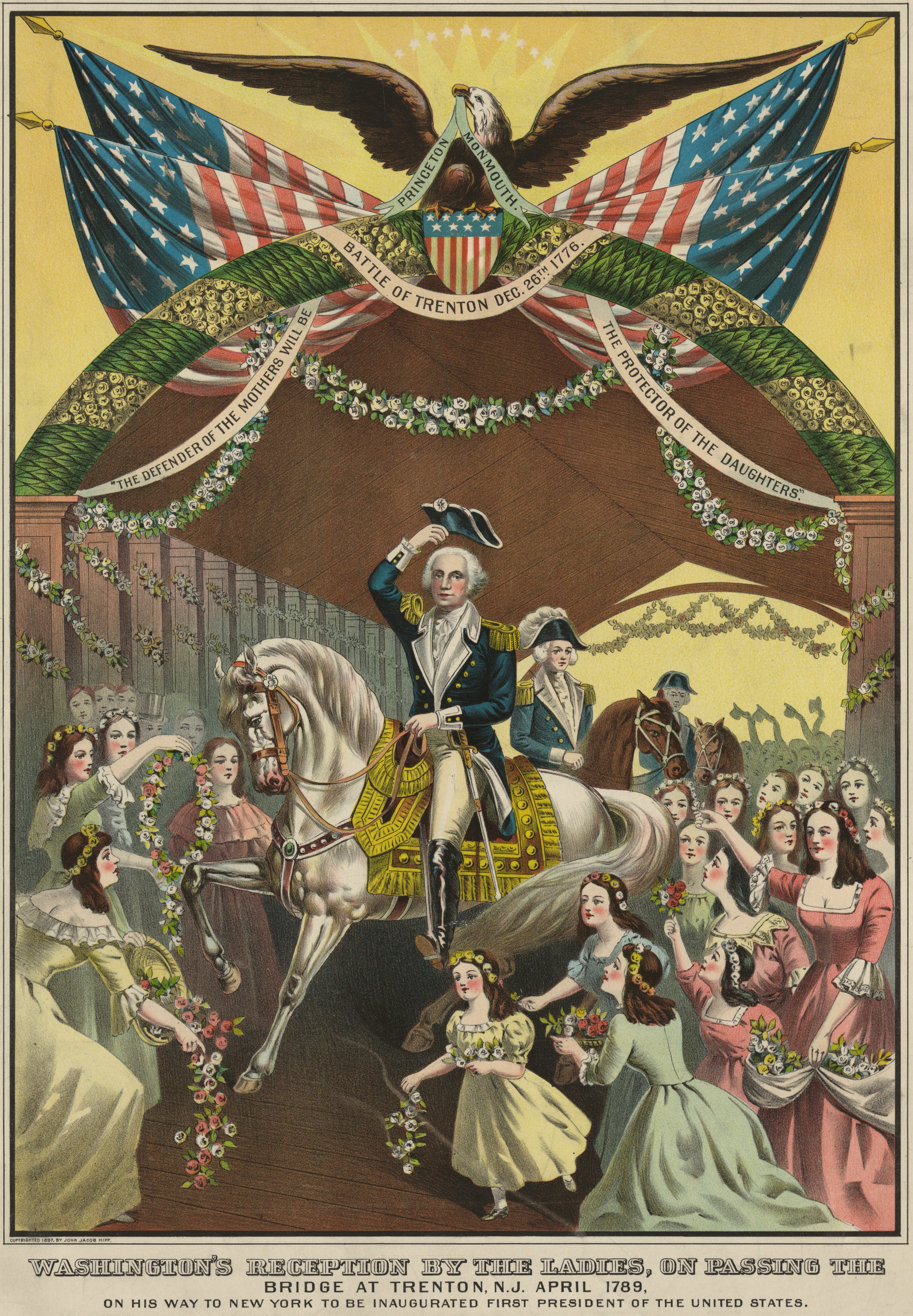
- Washington's Reception by the Ladies, on Passing the Bridge at Trenton, N.J. April 1789, on His Way to New York to be Inaugurated First President of the United States by John Jacob Hipp, 1897
- Date: April 21, 1789
- Venue: Bridge over the Assunpink Creek; City Tavern
- Location: Trenton, New Jersey; 40°13′06″N 74°45′51″W

George Washington's reception at Trenton was a celebration hosted by the Ladies of Trenton social club on April 21, 1789, in Trenton, New Jersey, as George Washington, then president-elect, journeyed from his home at Mount Vernon to his first inauguration in the then capital of the United States, New York City. A ceremonial triumphal arch was erected on the bridge over the Assunpink Creek to commemorate his two victories here, the Battle of Trenton on December 26, 1776 and the Battle of the Assunpink Creek on January 2, 1777.

== History ==
On April 6, 1789, after the 1788–89 United States presidential election, a joint session of Congress counted the votes of the Electoral College and reported that George Washington had been elected president. The president-elect then left Mount Vernon on April 16 for his journey to the capital. By April 20, he had reached Philadelphia and was greeted by a large crowd and a decorated arch at Gray's Ferry Bridge.

The next day, by about 2 pm, he crossed the Delaware River to the Trenton Ferry landing and entered the city riding on a white horse. He then proceeded to the Eagle Tavern, where he was met by General Philemon Dickinson, Major Richard Howell, Rev. James Francis Armstrong, Chief Justice David Brearley, Dr. Isaac Smith, and other dignitaries. The reception in Trenton was described contemporaneously in a letter to the editor dated April 25, 1789 and published in the May 1789 issue of the Columbian Magazine. Washington next advanced to the bridge over the Assunpink Creek where a large triumphal arch had been erected. On the arch were two dates referring to his victories at Trenton: the Battle of Trenton on December 26, 1776 and the Battle of the Assunpink Creek on January 2, 1777. The arch had thirteen pillars, wrapped with laurel greenery and flowers. A banner at the top of the arch had "The Defender of the Mothers Will Also Protect Their Daughters" written in gold letters. The ladies of Trenton and their daughters, dressed in white, were positioned past the arch, along the way into town. As Washington passed by, the daughters sang a special sonata, starting with "Welcome, mighty Chief!" and spread flowers before him.

Later, there was a dinner and reception at Samuel Henry's City Tavern. During the day, a new tune was played, "The President's March", composed by Philip Phile for the inauguration. As he departed Trenton, Washington thanked the Ladies of Trenton with a handwritten note:

General Washington cannot leave this place without expressing his acknowledgments, to the Matrons and Young Ladies who received him in so novel & grateful a manner at the Triumphal Arch in Trenton, for the exquisite sensation he experienced in that affecting moment. The astonishing contrast between his former and actual situation at the same spot—The elegant taste with which it was adorned for the present occasion—and the innocent appearance of the white-robed Choir who met him with the gratulatory song, have made such impressions on his remembrance, as, he assures them, will never be effaced.

Next, he went to the celebration at Princeton, site of his victory at the Battle of Princeton on January 3, 1777.

== Gallery ==
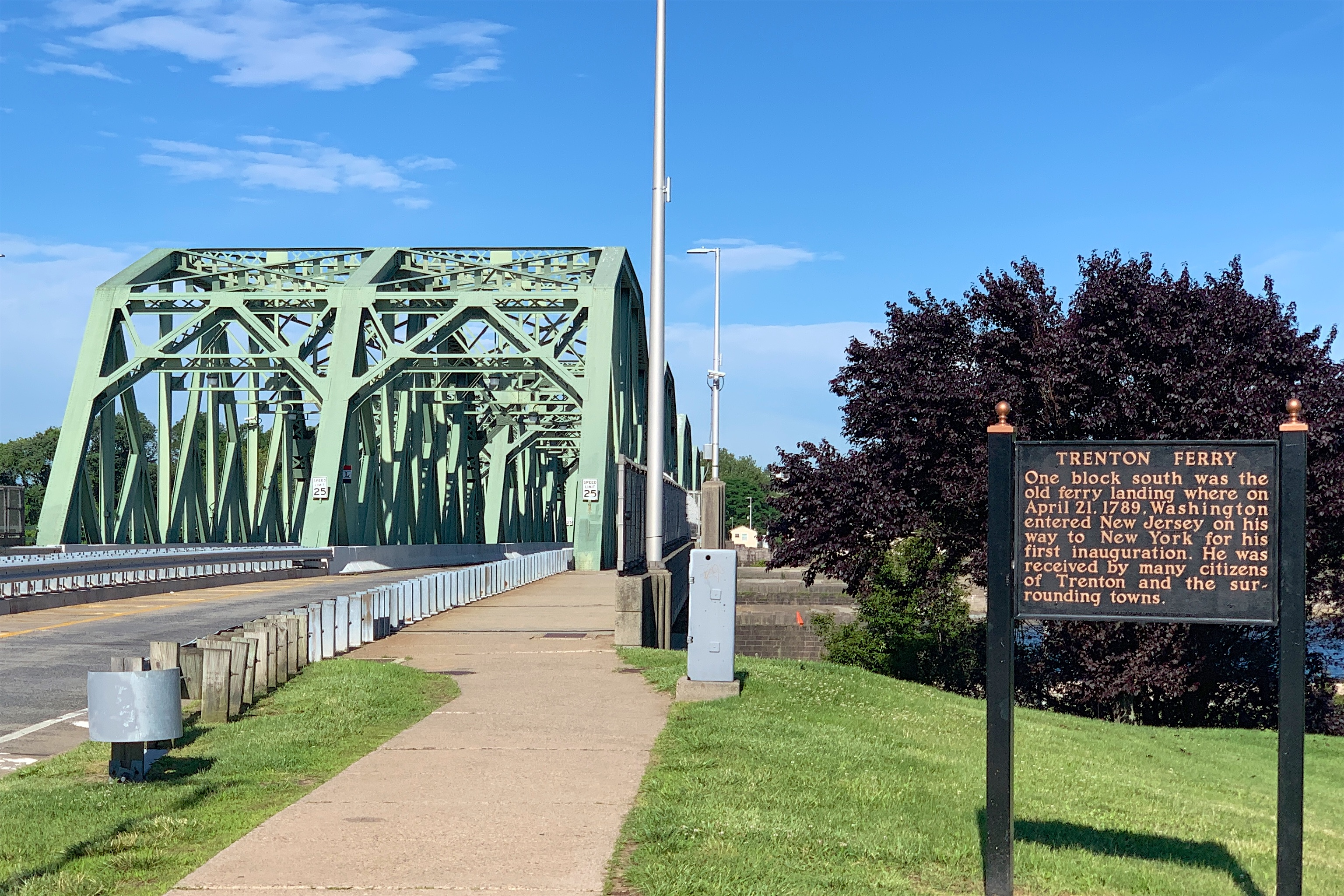
Old Trenton Ferry historic information sign

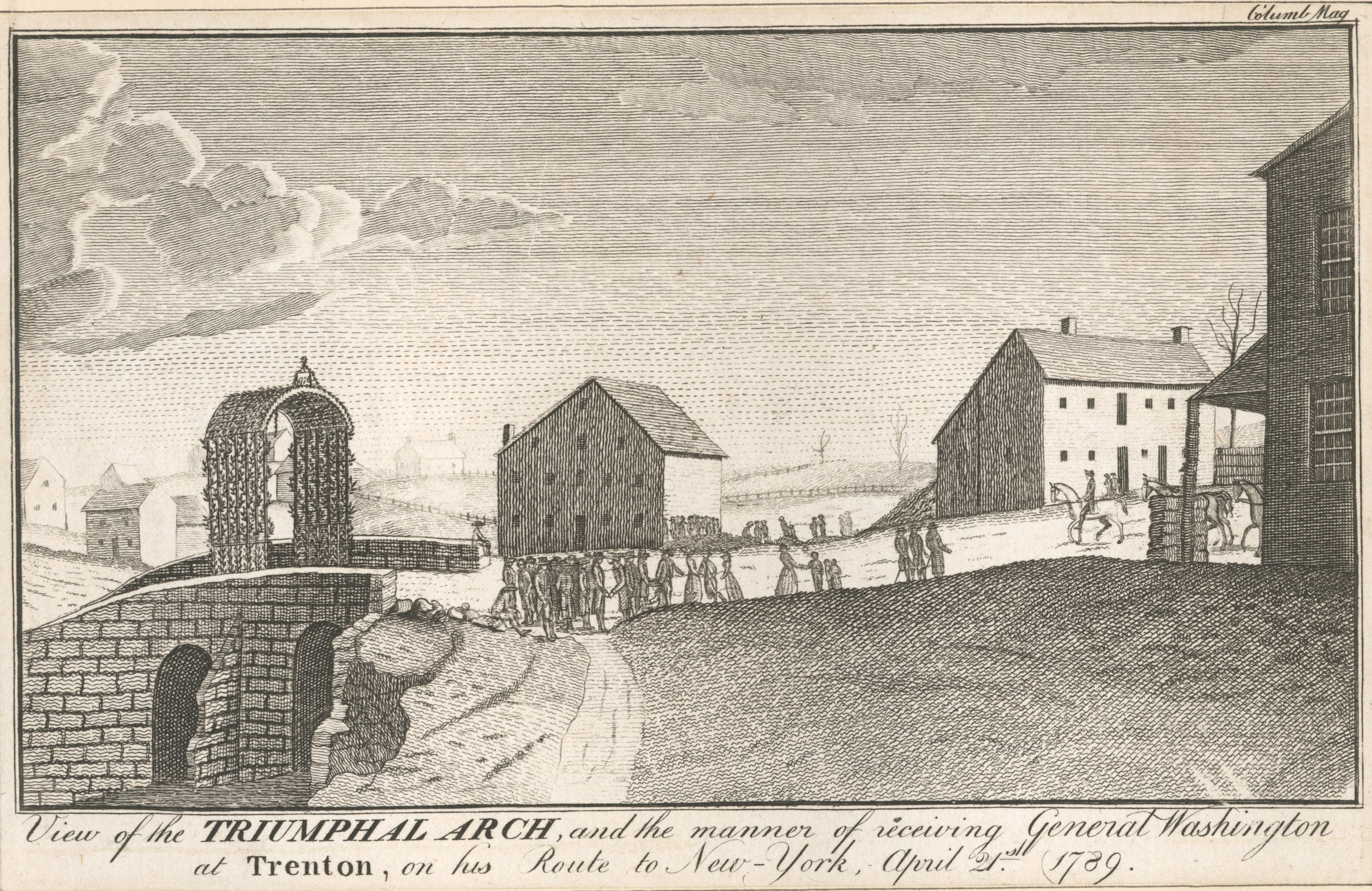
View of the Triumphal Arch, engraving attributed to James Trenchard, 1789

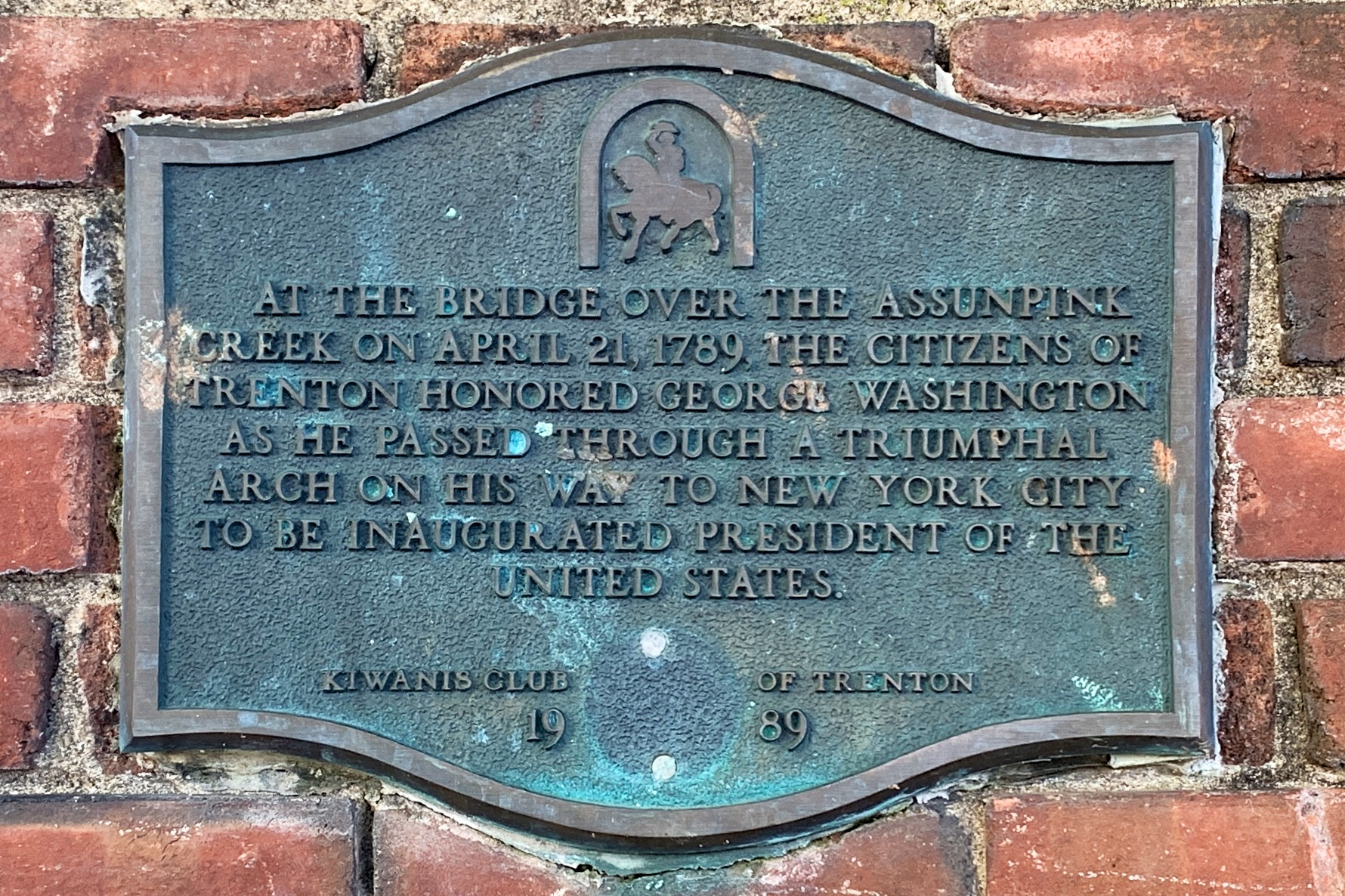
Triumphal Arch site information sign

== Legacy ==
The Triumphal Arch was used at the entrance to the New Jersey State House to honor the Marquis de Lafayette during his 1824 tour of the country.

The celebration was re-enacted in 1989, the bicentennial of Washington's reception at Trenton.

In 2018, a historic information sign, made over fifty years ago, was erected near the site of the old Trenton Ferry, now by the Lower Trenton Bridge, to celebrate this reception.

== Artistic depictions ==
Washington's reception at Trenton has been depicted by many artists since Trenchard. In 1792, John Trumbull created a charcoal sketch, Bridge and Arch at Trenton. Between 1823 and 1835, Thomas Kelly created the engraving Washington's reception on the Bridge at Trenton in 1789 on his way to be Inaugurated 1st President of the U.S.. In 1840, plans were announced to create a pedestal for the statue of Washington by Ferdinand Pettrich. One panel was to display the Ladies of Trenton greeting Washington. However, these plans were not executed. In 1845, Currier and Ives printed the lithograph Washington's Reception by the Ladies, on Passing the Bridge at Trenton, N.J. April 1789, on His Way to be Inaugurated First President of the United States. In 1897, John Jacob Hipp produced a chromolithograph with the same title. In the 1850s, Thomas Crawford designed a pair of bronze doors for the Senate, which included a panel depicting the reception. Louis Kurz's painting of the reception was printed as a lithograph George Washington entering Trenton 1789 in 1907 by Kurz and Allison. In 1930, the American artist N. C. Wyeth painted the large-scale work, Reception to Washington on April 21, 1789, at Trenton on his way to New York to Assume the Duties of the Presidency of the United States, now on display at Thomas Edison State University. In 2019, the painting was donated by Wells Fargo to the university, the most expensive gift ever given to the university, valued by Sotheby's at $4 million.

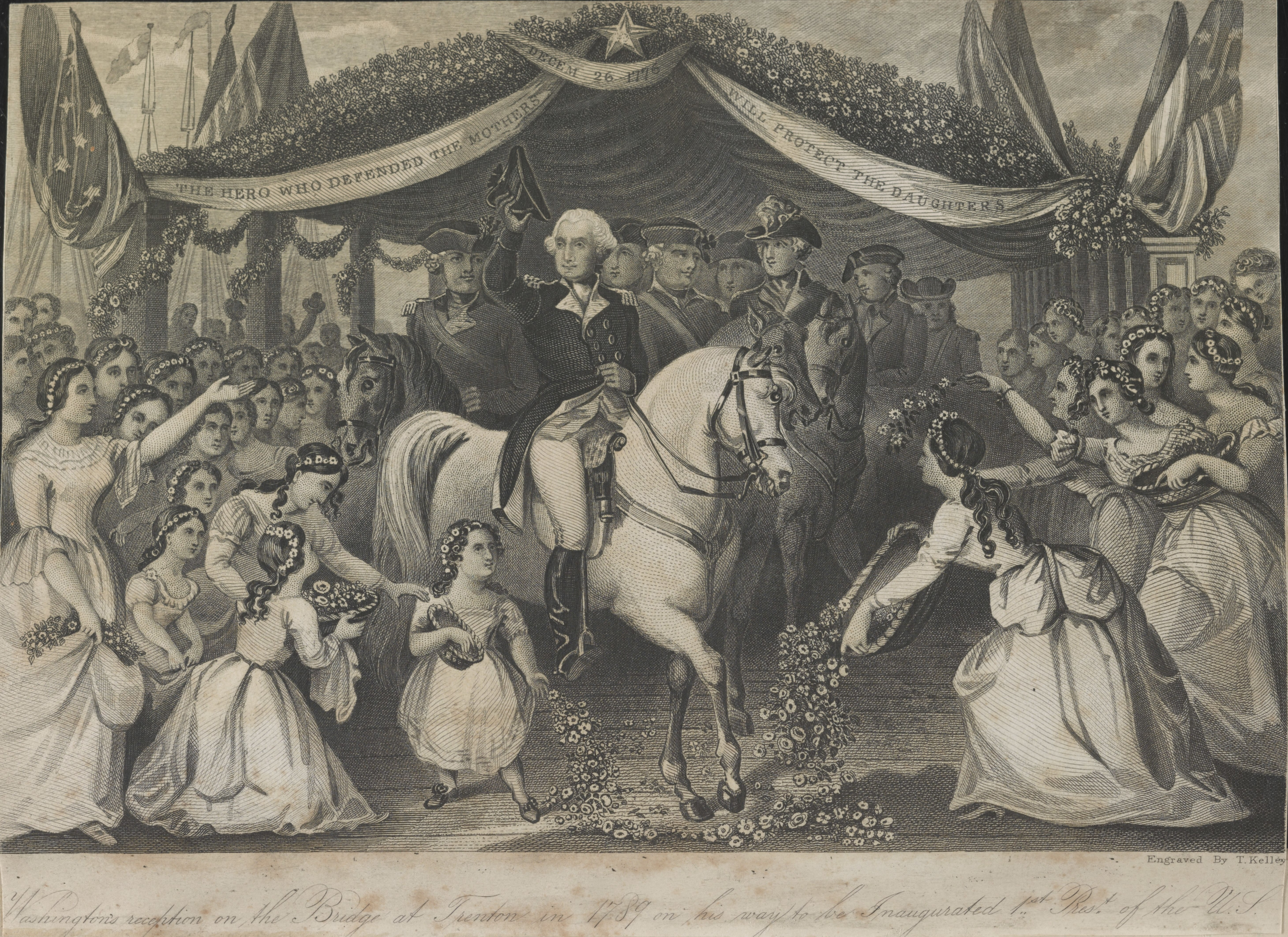
Engraving by Thomas Kelly, 1823–1835

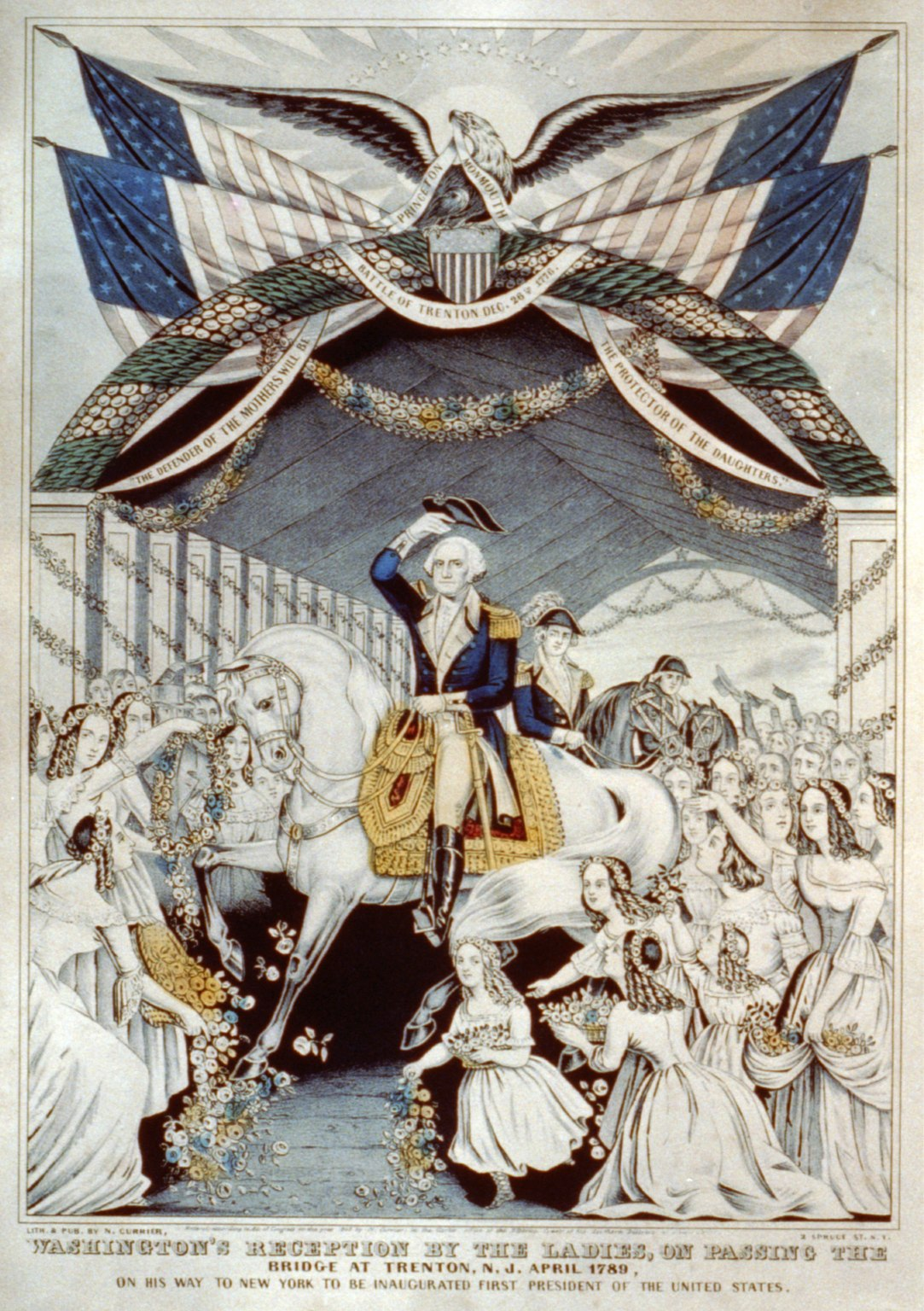
Lithograph by Currier and Ives, 1845

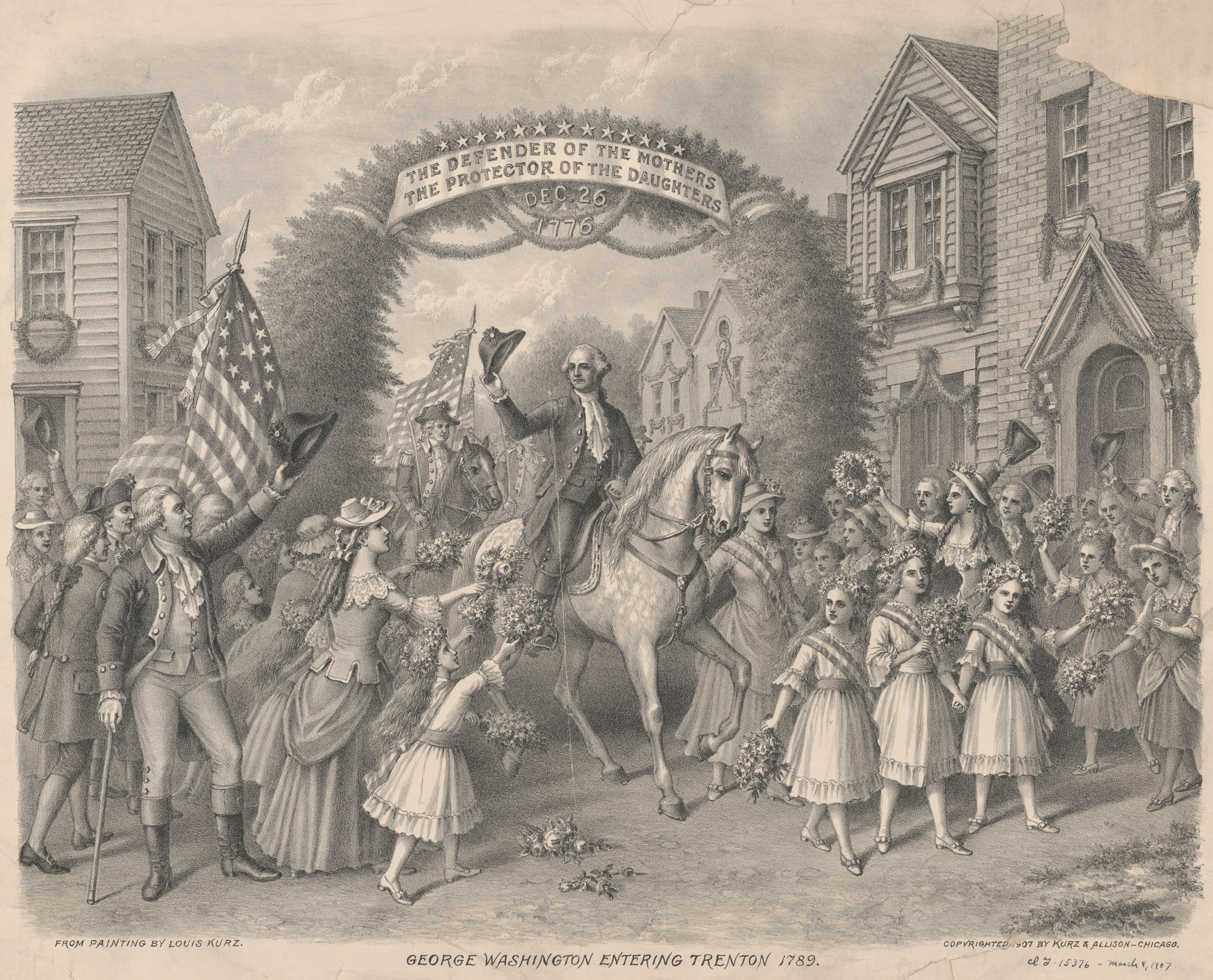
Lithograph by Kurz and Allison, 1907

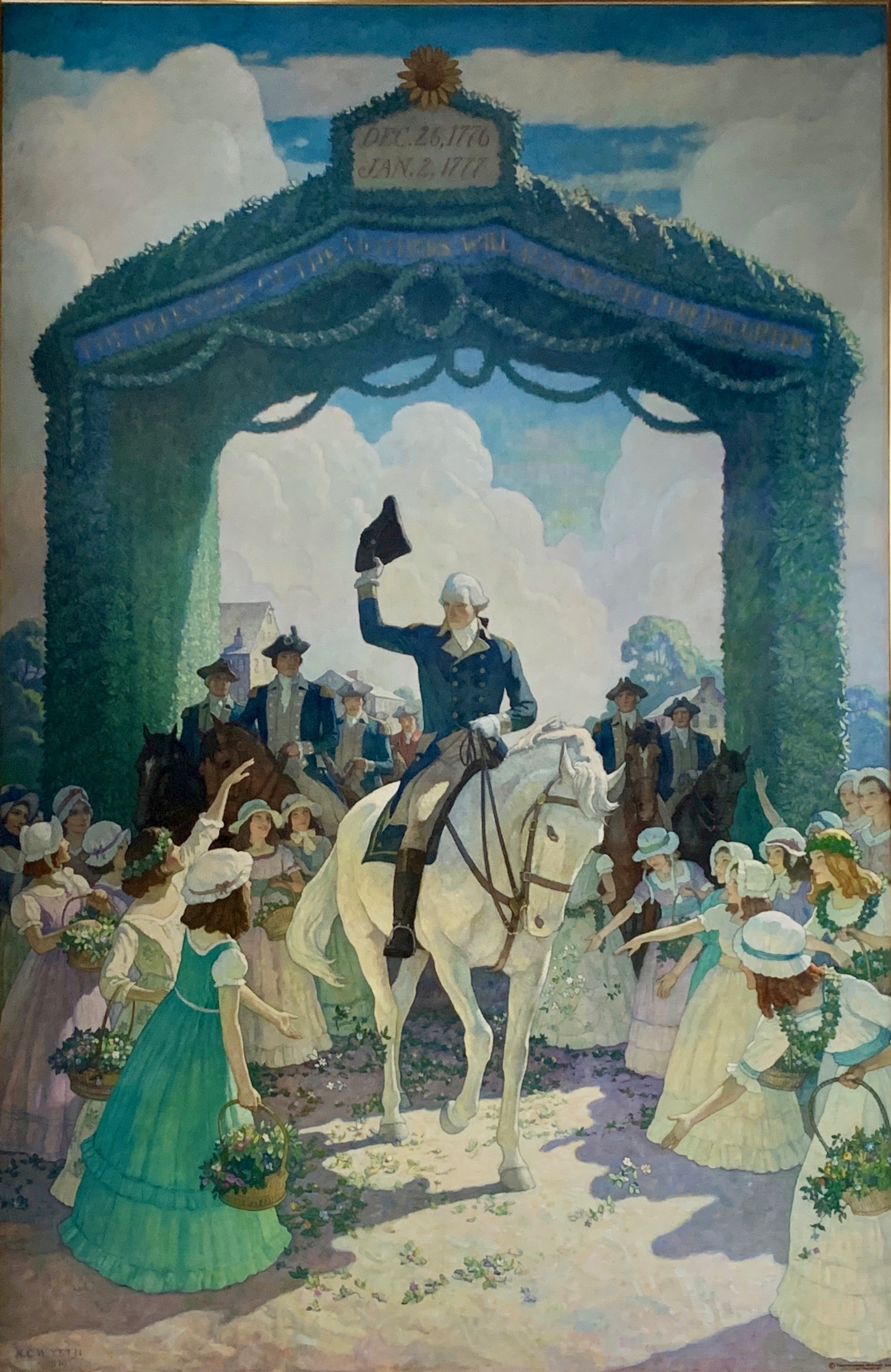
Painting by N. C. Wyeth, 1930

== See also ==
- 1789 in the United States
