= French Arms Tavern =

Former historic building in New Jersey

Coordinates: 40.2203°N 74.7658°W

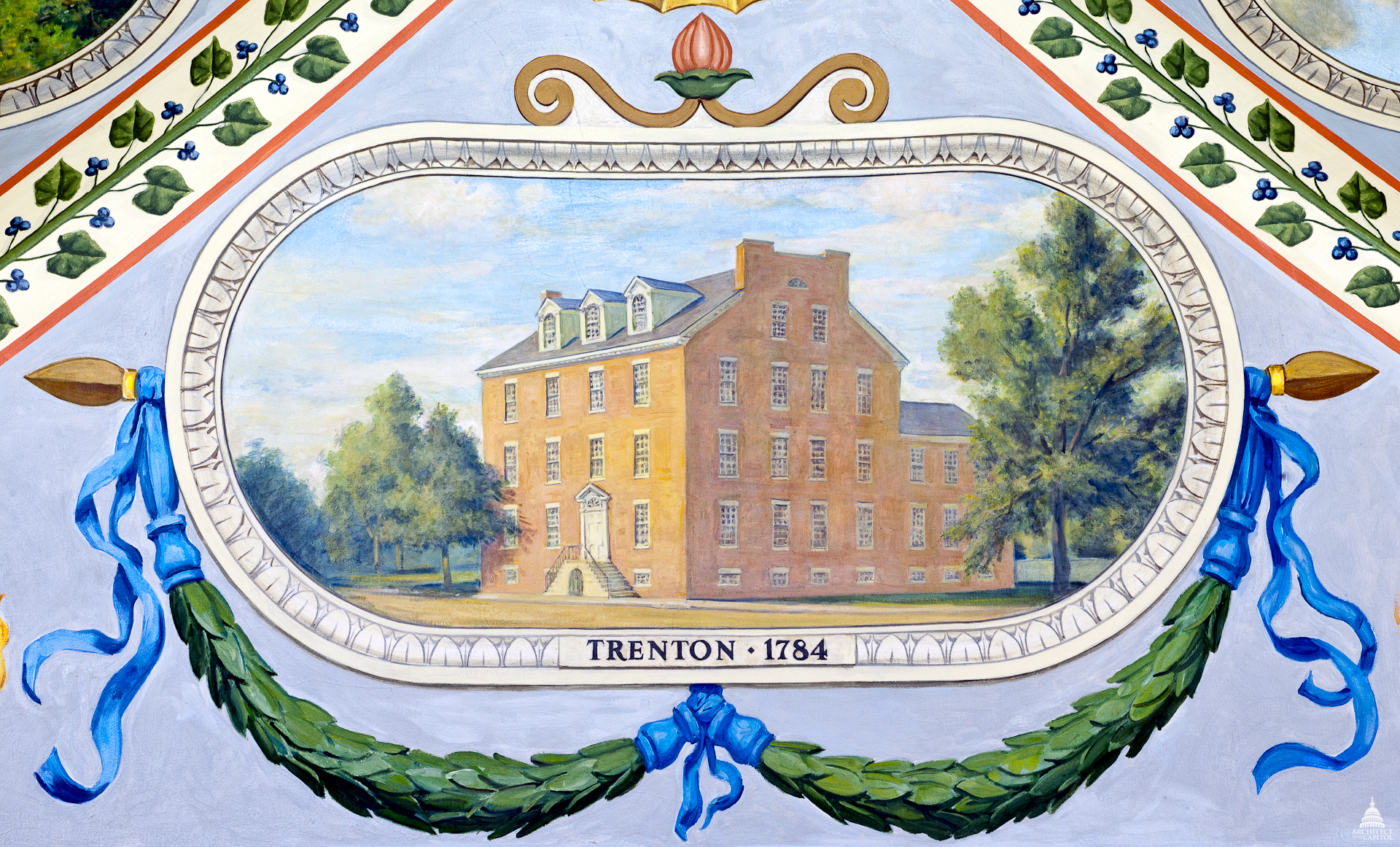
Allyn Cox painting of the French Arms Tavern

The French Arms Tavern (also known as the Thirteen Stars, Blazing Star Tavern, City Tavern and City Hotel) was a structure in Trenton, New Jersey, that served as the capitol of the United States and meeting place of the Congress of the Confederation from November 1, 1784, to December 24, 1784. The building was located at the southwest corner of King (now Warren) and Second (now State) Streets from 1730 until 1837 when it was torn down.

== History ==
Historian William Backes described the original building as "a stone house two stories high with gable roof. The building measured 45 feet front by 53 feet in depth, with a kitchen in the rear containing rooms for servants on the second floor. It was the handsomest and most commodious house in Trenton in its day." From 1740 until 1742 it was the official residence of Royal Governor Lewis Morris.

During the Second Battle of Trenton, it was involved in "one of the most brutal military murders" of the New Jersey campaign when Reverend John Rosburgh was bayonetted to death by Hessian troops.

From April 1, 1780, until February 1781 it was known as the Thirteen Stars and run by Jacob Bergen. In 1781, John Cape, upon becoming the proprietor, changed the name to the French and Indian Arms, commonly referred to as the French Arms Tavern. In 1783, Jacob Bergen returned to operate the tavern again. It was extensively renovated in 1784, combining the rooms on the first floor into one room known as the Long Room. Moore Furman, James Ewing, and Conrad Knotts signed a lease with Bergen for annual payment of 150 pounds for "the use and purpose of Congress of the United States to set in."

It continued to be known as the French Arms Tavern until being leased to Francis Witt on January 4, 1785 and renamed the Blazing Star.

From December 11 to December 18, 1787, it served as the meeting location for the New Jersey ratification convention for the United States Constitution.

On April 1, 1789, Henry Drake took over the tavern and renamed it the City Tavern. It was here on April 21, 1789, that George Washington, journeying to New York for his inauguration, dined after being received by the citizens of Trenton at the Assunpink Creek Bridge.

In 1836, the First Mechanics and Manufacturers Bank purchased the property, tore down the tavern and constructed a new two-story building on the site. The building is currently occupied by a Wedding venue.

== Gallery ==
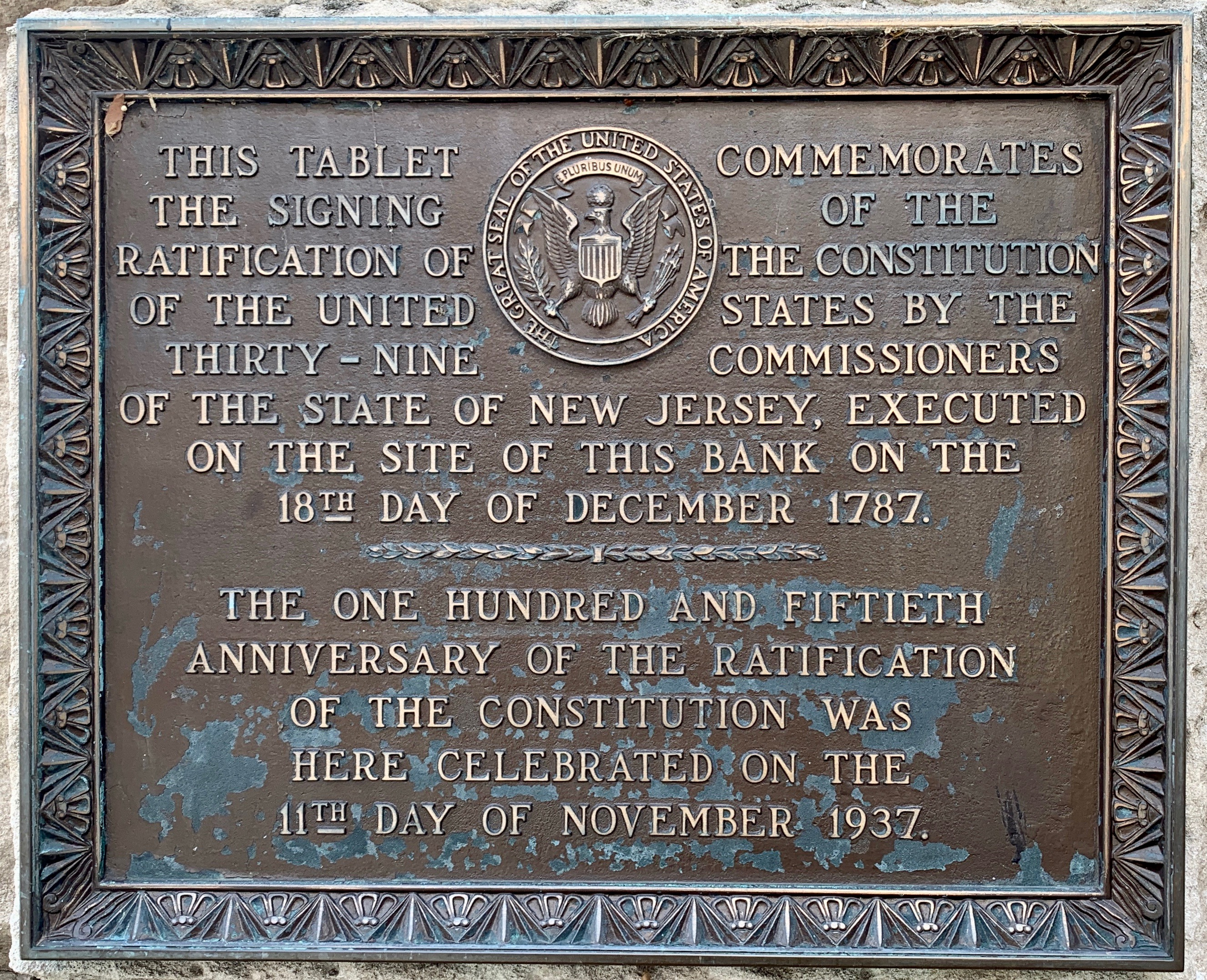
Plaque commemorating New Jersey's ratification of the United States Constitution on the One West State Street building now at this site

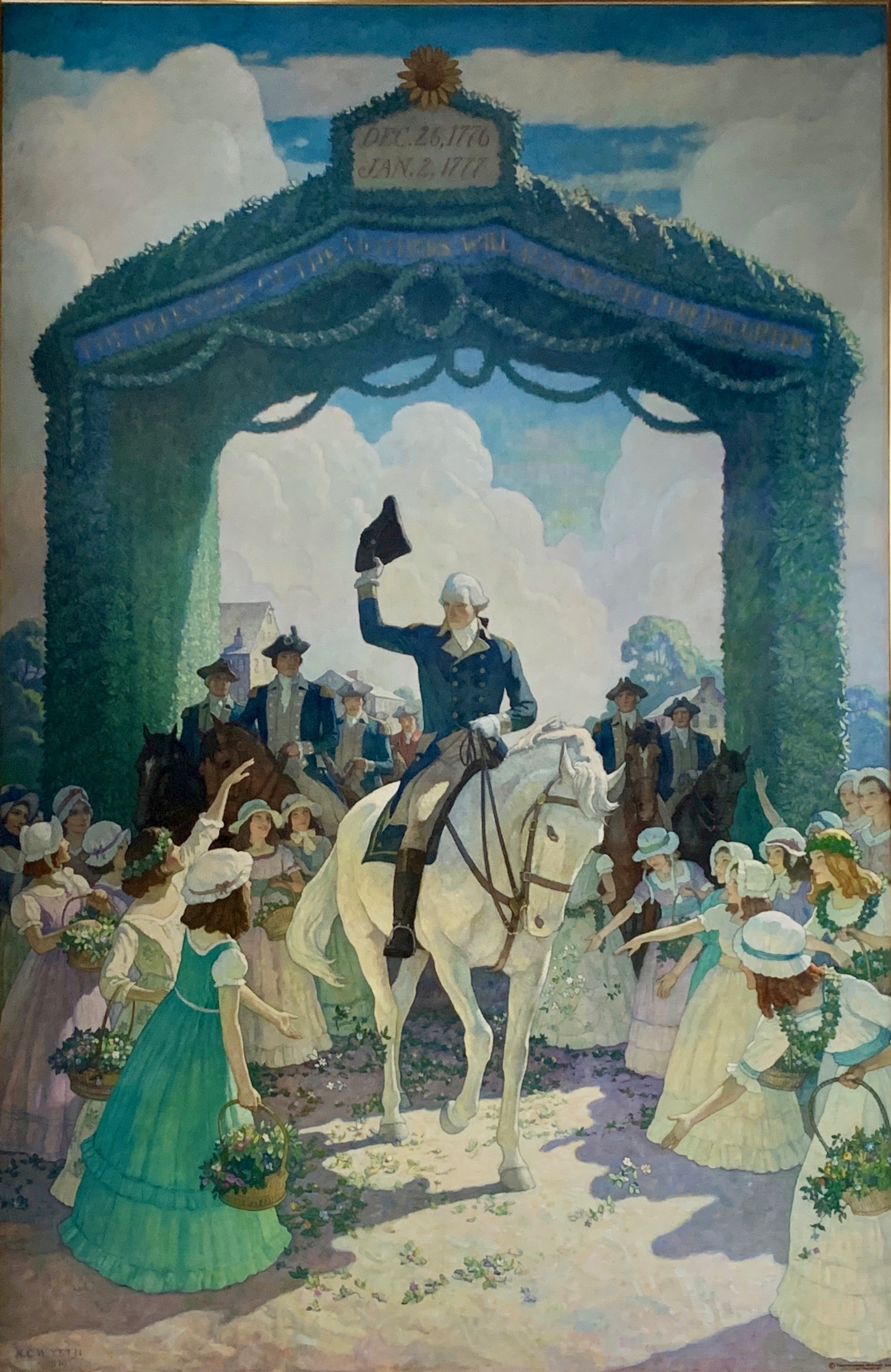
Reception to Washington on April 21, 1789, at Trenton on his way to New York to Assume the Duties of the Presidency of the United States, by N. C. Wyeth, 1930

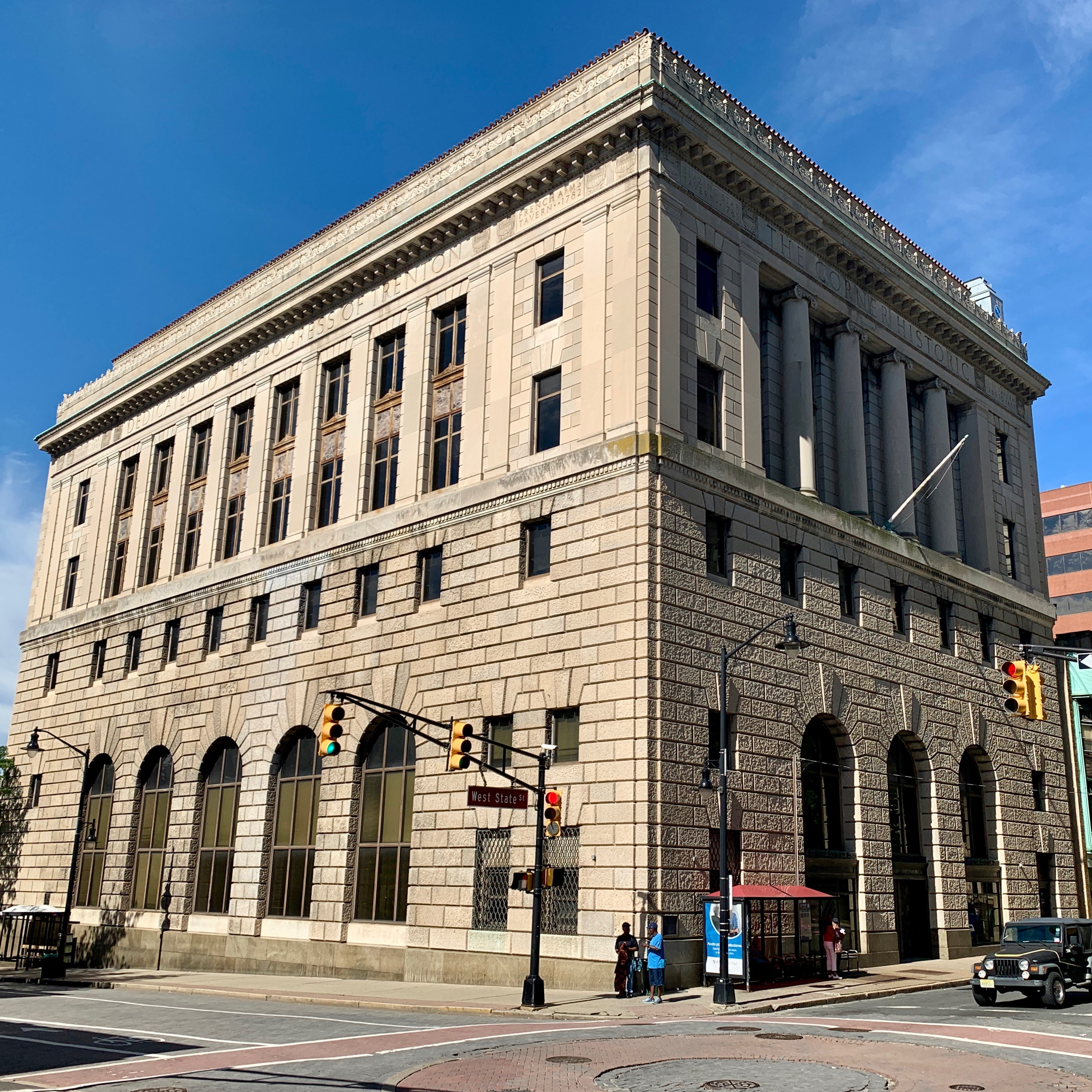
One West State Street building on this site

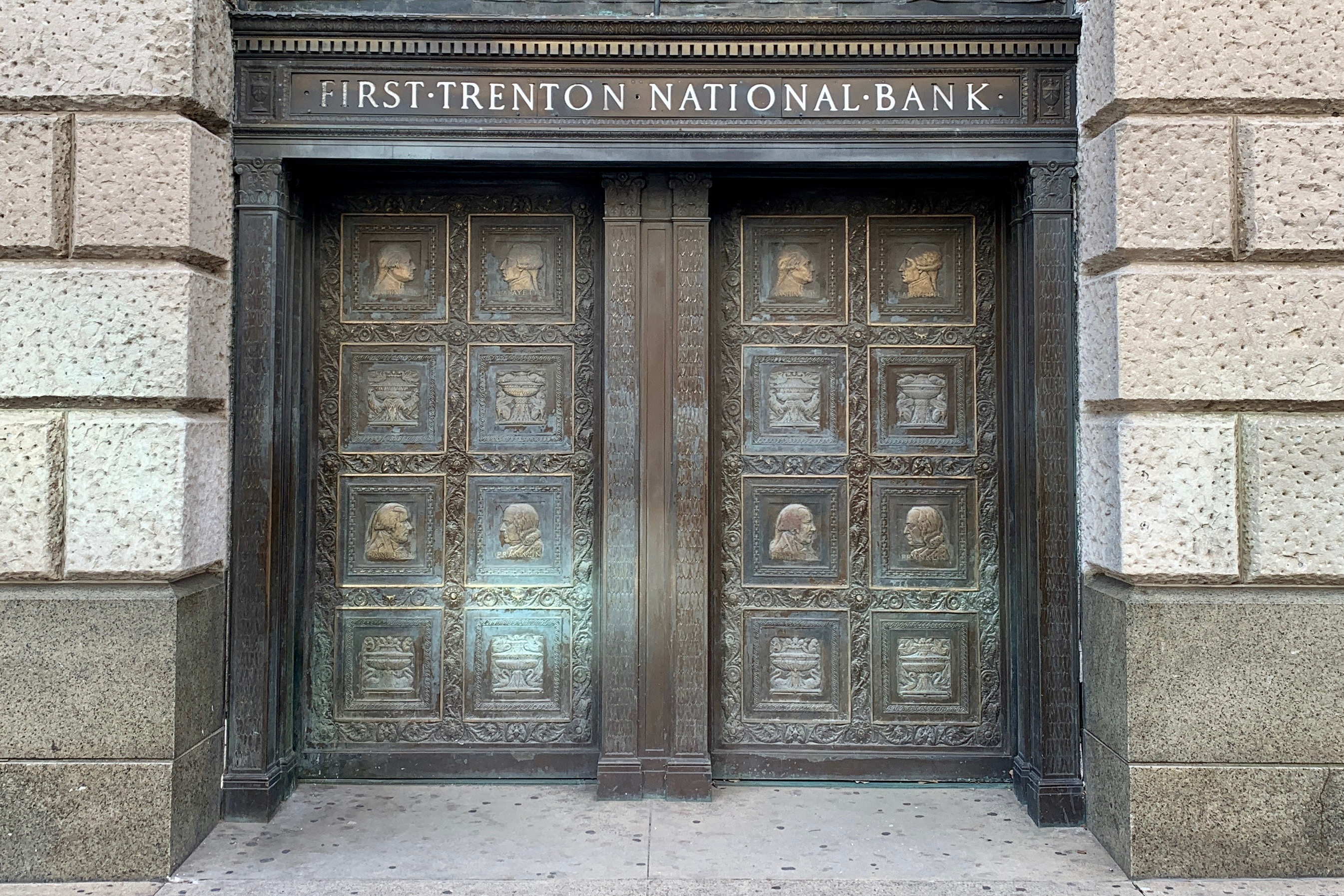
Bronze doors at One West State Street, featuring bas-relief portraits of George Washington, Marquis de Lafayette, Alexander Hamilton, and Benjamin Franklin.
