= Reception to Washington on April 21, 1789, at Trenton on His Way to New York to Assume the Duties of the Presidency of the United States =

1930 painting by N. C. Wyeth

Reception to Washington on April 21, 1789, at Trenton on his way to New York to Assume the Duties of the Presidency of the United States
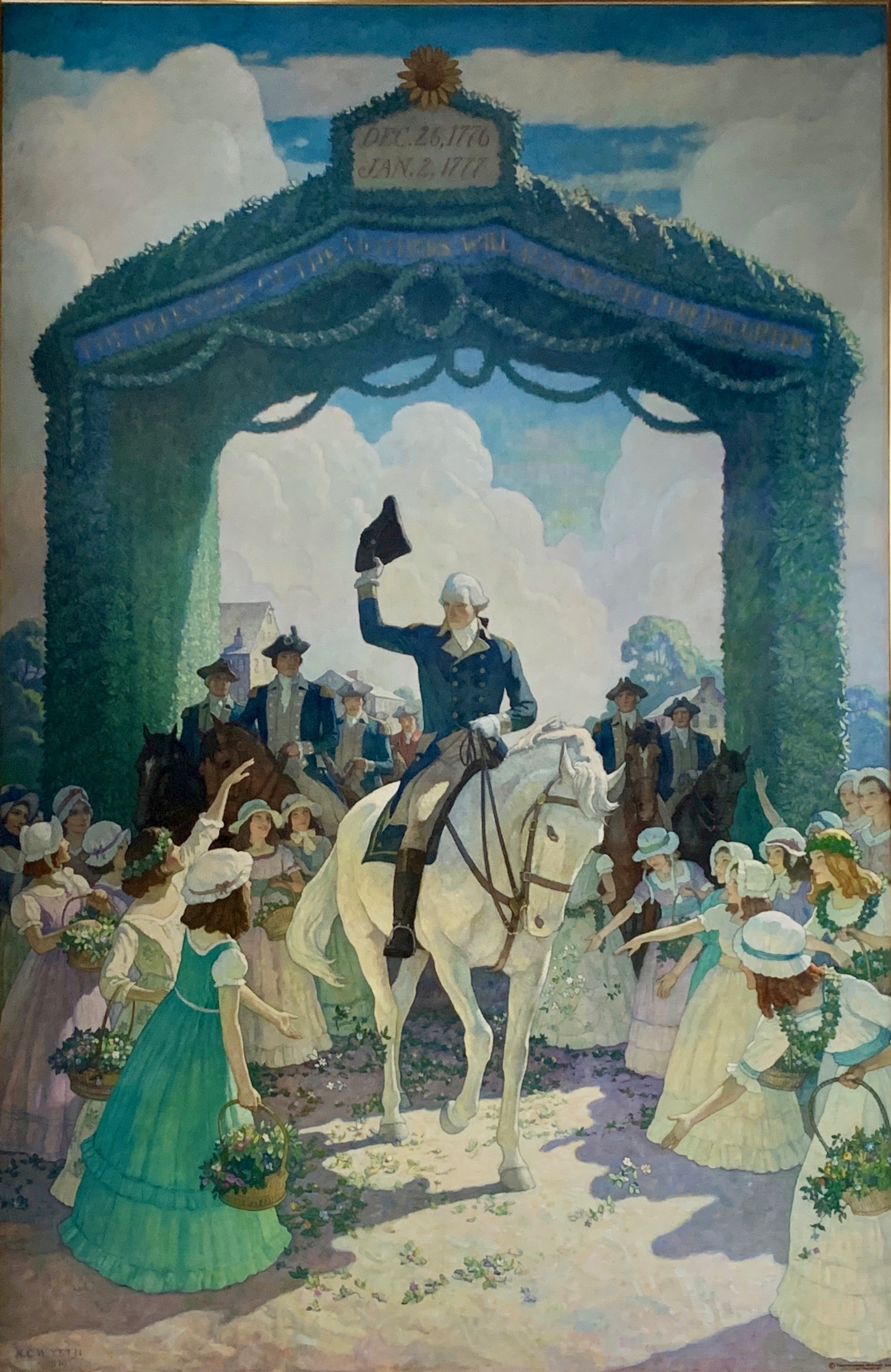
- Artist: N. C. Wyeth
- Year: 1930
- Medium: oil on canvas
- Dimensions: 5.2 m × 3.7 m (17 ft × 12 ft)
- Location: Thomas Edison State University, Trenton, New Jersey

Reception to Washington on April 21, 1789, at Trenton on his way to New York to Assume the Duties of the Presidency of the United States is a large-scale oil painting completed in 1930 by American artist N. C. Wyeth of president-elect George Washington at his reception in Trenton, New Jersey during his journey to the 1789 inauguration in New York City. The mural was commissioned by the First Mechanics National Bank of Trenton, now part of Wells Fargo. It has been on display in the lobby of Thomas Edison State University since 2013. Wells Fargo donated the painting to the university in 2019, the most expensive gift ever given to the university.

== History ==
N. C. Wyeth was an American artist, known for his illustrations in Treasure Island. His works are part of the collection at the Brandywine River Museum. The First Mechanics National Bank of Trenton commissioned the work in 1927, at a time when Trenton was planning to celebrate the 250th anniversary of its settlement, 1679–1929. Wyeth thought that George Washington's reception at Trenton on his journey to the first inauguration in New York City was an appropriate subject. As part of his research in 1928, Wyeth used a letter to the editor dated April 25, 1789 and published in the May 1789 issue of the Columbian Magazine to compose the mural. The letter describes the reception on April 21 in detail and included an illustration of the Triumphal Arch. Wyeth made a preparatory sketch using watercolor and gouache on paper in 1928. He then created and completed the oil painting by 1930 in his studio at Chadds Ford, Pennsylvania. The bank installed the mural in its new building at One West State Street in Trenton. The site was the location of the former City Tavern, where Washington had been for a formal dinner and reception on April 21. The painting was cleaned and restored from 1993 to 1994. Wells Fargo, subsequent bank to First Mechanics, loaned the painting to Thomas Edison State University in 2013, when the bank moved its branch to another location. In 2019, Wells Fargo donated the painting to the university. Valued by Sotheby's at $4 million, this was the highest-value gift ever given to the university.

== Description ==
In the center of the painting, George Washington, entering riding on a white horse and holding a tricorner hat, passes under a large decorated arch and is greeted by children holding baskets of flowers and spreading them in his path. He is escorted by several men on horseback in the background. At the top of the arch are two dates: Dec. 26, 1776 (First Battle of Trenton) and Jan. 2, 1777 (Second Battle of Trenton). The arch also has a banner that reads "The Defender of the Mothers Will Also Protect the Daughters" on a blue background. The arch is decorated with laurel greenery and a single, large sunflower at the top. The sunflower was said to represent the phrase, "To You Alone".

== Legacy ==
The mural is used as the book cover art of Crossroads of the Revolution: Trenton 1774–1783 by historian William L. Kidder.

== Gallery ==
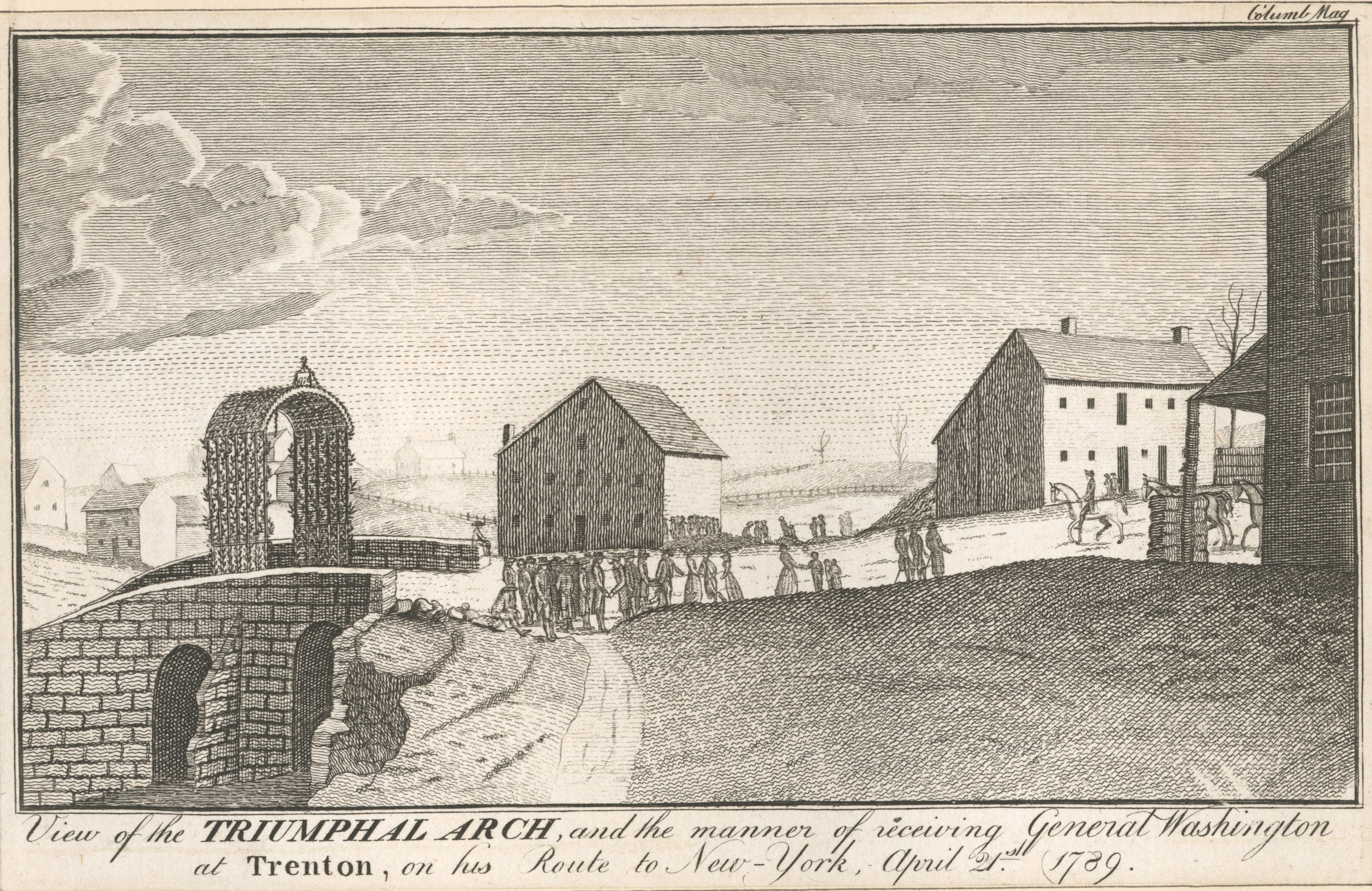
View of the Triumphal Arch, engraving attributed to James Trenchard, 1789

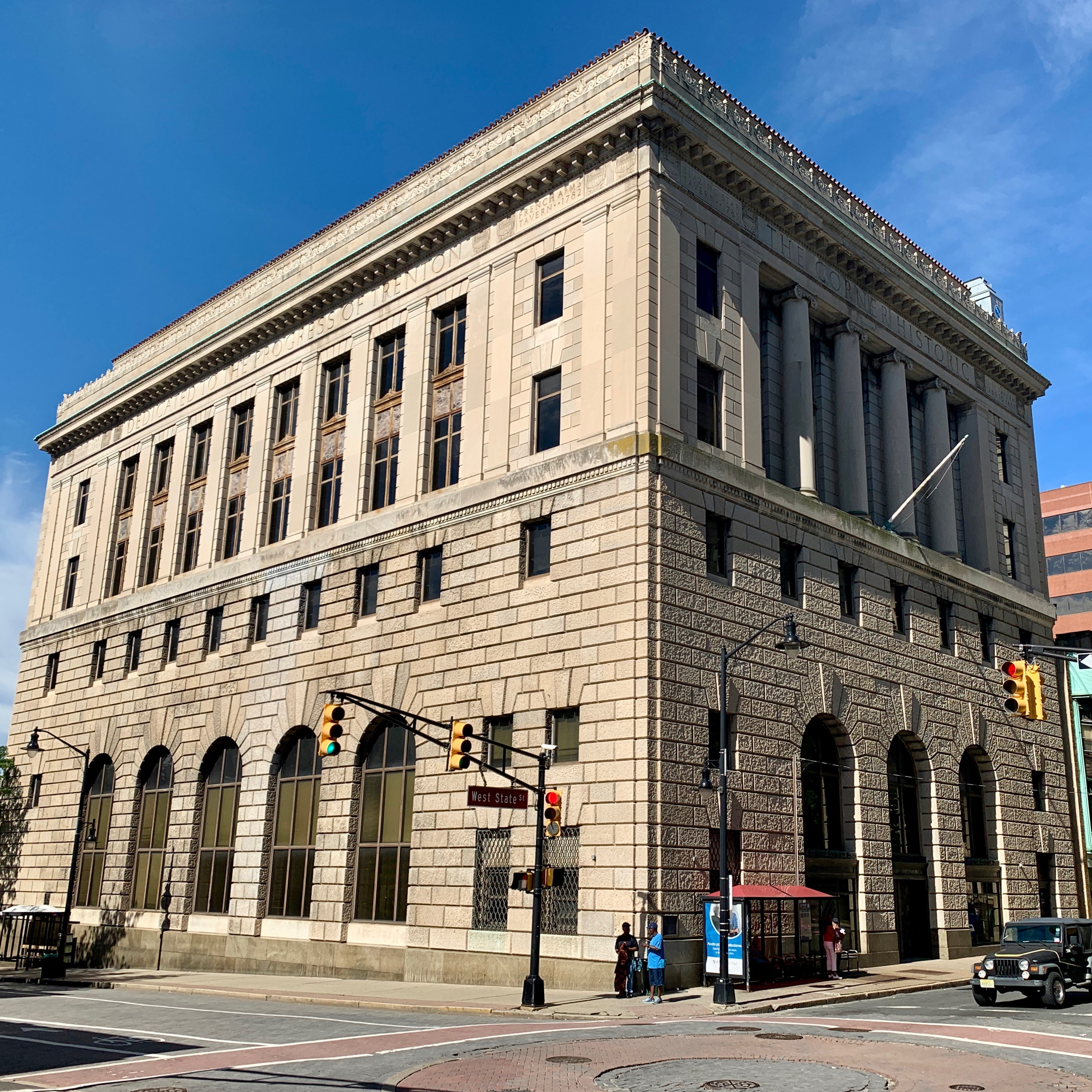
One West State Street, Trenton
former First Mechanics National Bank Building, site of former City Tavern

== See also ==
- George Washington's reception at Trenton – historical event on April 21, 1789
- 1930 in art
- List of paintings of George Washington
