= Kurz and Allison =

19th-century chromolithograph publisher

- Status: Defunct
- Founded: 1880
- Founder: Louis Kurz and Alexander Allison
- Country of origin: United States
- Headquarters location: Chicago, Illinois, U.S.
- Distribution: national
- Publication types: Prints

Kurz and Allison were a major publisher of chromolithographs in the late 19th century. Based at 267-269 Wabash Avenue in Chicago, they built their reputation on large prints published in the mid-1880s depicting battles of the American Civil War. A set of 36 battle scenes were published from designs by Louis Kurz (1835–1921), himself a veteran of the war. Kurz, a native of Salzburg, Austria, emigrated to the United States in 1848.

While the prints were highly inaccurate and considered naive fantasies like Currier and Ives prints, they were still sought after. They did not pretend to mirror the actual events but rather attempted to tap people's patriotic emotions. When the Spanish–American War broke out in 1898, the company created several large prints of the major battles and of the subsequent campaign of the Philippine–American War. Later conflicts such as the Russo-Japanese War were also illustrated by the company.

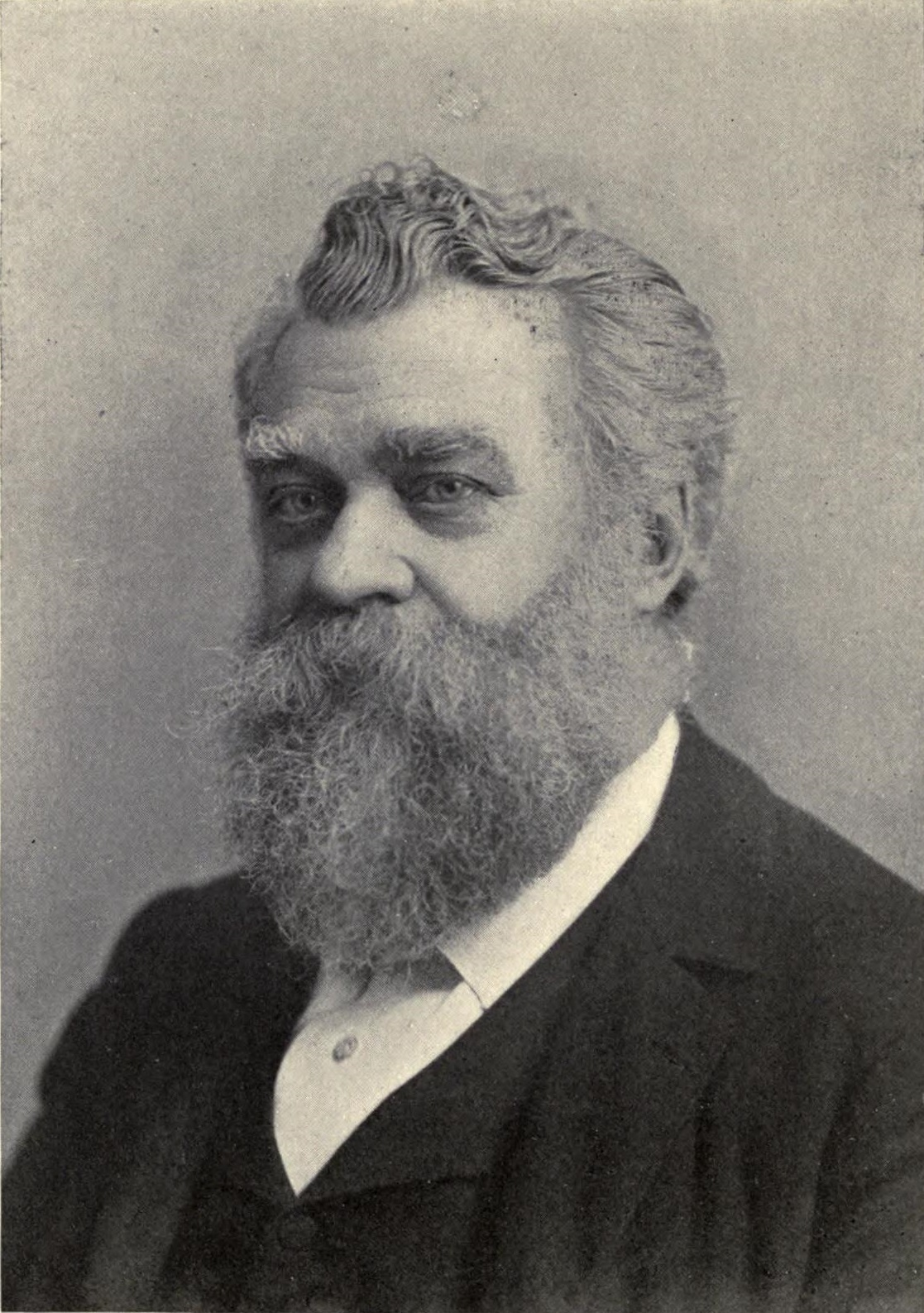
Louis Kurz (Ludwig Ferdinand Joseph Kurz von Goldenstein) by W. J. Root

== Formation of the firm ==
Louis Kurz first worked as a lithographer in Milwaukee, together with Henry Sifert. After the Civil War, he was one of the founders of the Chicago Lithographing Company. He worked there until the company was destroyed in the Great Chicago Fire of 1871. He then returned to Milwaukee, and started the American Oleograph Company. He moved back to Chicago in 1878, where in 1880 he became a partner in the newly founded firm of Kurz and Allison. Alexander Allison probably provided financial backing.

== Civil War print series ==
In 1884, Kurz and Allison published a single print of the battle of Gettysburg inspired by Paul Philippoteaux's popular cyclorama on the same subject, and probably intended to profit by the popularity of the cyclorama. The cyclorama was first exhibited in Chicago in 1883, where Kurz then was living.) According to Neely and Holzer (2000) "The influence of the Gettysburg cyclorama on the Kurz and Alison print is readily recognizable. … The print openly copied vignettes from the painting and in at least one instance perpetuated a historical error ..."

In June 1886, Louis Prang published a series of prints under the title Prang's War Pictures. (They may well have been available for purchase individually some months earlier.) Shortly thereafter Kurz and Allison reissued their print of the Battle of Gettysburg and designed and issued additional prints in the same format (28 by 22 inches). Three such prints were issued in 1886, three in 1887, seven in 1888, six in 1889, four in 1890, six in 1891, one in 1891, four in 1892, and one in 1893. According to Neely and Holzer (2000), Kurz and Alison, although inspired by Prang's work, did not imitate his artistic aspirations. "Kurz and Alison remained true to the popular tradition in lithography embodied in the work of Currier and Ives; Prang was aiming higher." Neely and Holzer (2000) emphasize Kurz and Allison's "antiphotographic" adherence to the traditions of popular lithography and the artistic styles of Civil War publications, in contrast to Prang's more modern style.

Several of the Kurz and Alison Civil War prints featured Black soldiers, including Storming Fort Wagner (1890) and The Fort Pillow Massacre (1893), which was unusual at the time.

== Other work ==
Kurz and Allison also issued a series of "family prints" which showed such Civil War figures as Jefferson Davis, Abraham Lincoln, Ulysses S. Grant, and James A Garfield in domestic settings, surrounded by their families. At least one lithograph entitled "George Washington at Mount Vernon" (1889) is known to exist depicting George Washington, Martha Washington and Martha's two children. The firm also produced lithographs of a number of natural US disasters which included The Great Conemaugh Valley Disaster -- Flood & Fire at Johnstown, Pa about the Johnstown Flood of 1889 as well as Galveston's awful calamity - Gulf tidal wave, September 8, 1900 based on the Great Galveston hurricane of 1900.

The firm also produced a sizable number of black and white lithographs on religious subjects. These were marketed to localized communities with ethnic identities, often separated from their compatriots, often in the West. Many of the firm's prints were reproduced in New Mexican tinwork.

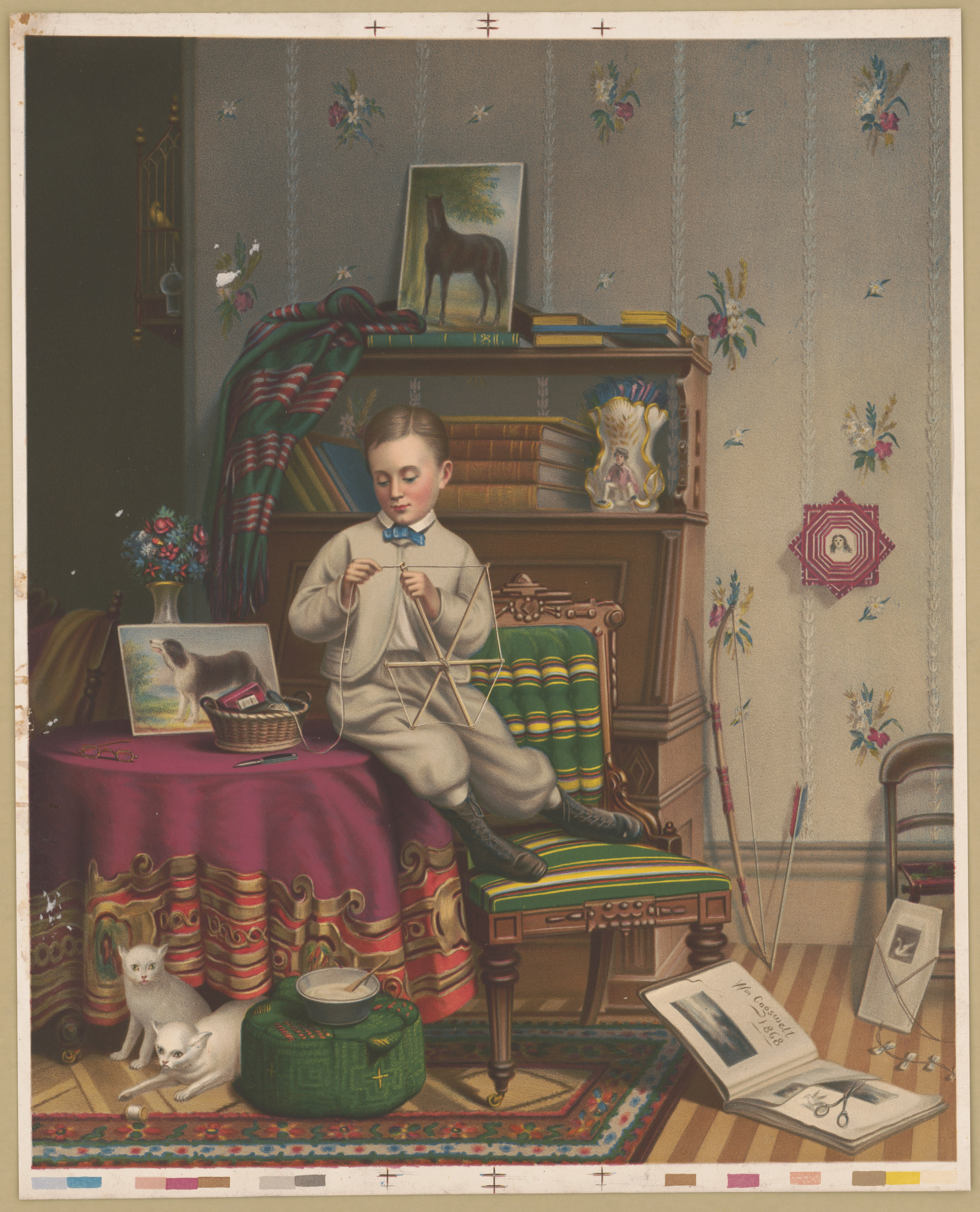
Making the kite copied by Louis Kurz, of the Chicago Lithographing Company, after Wm. Cogswell's painting

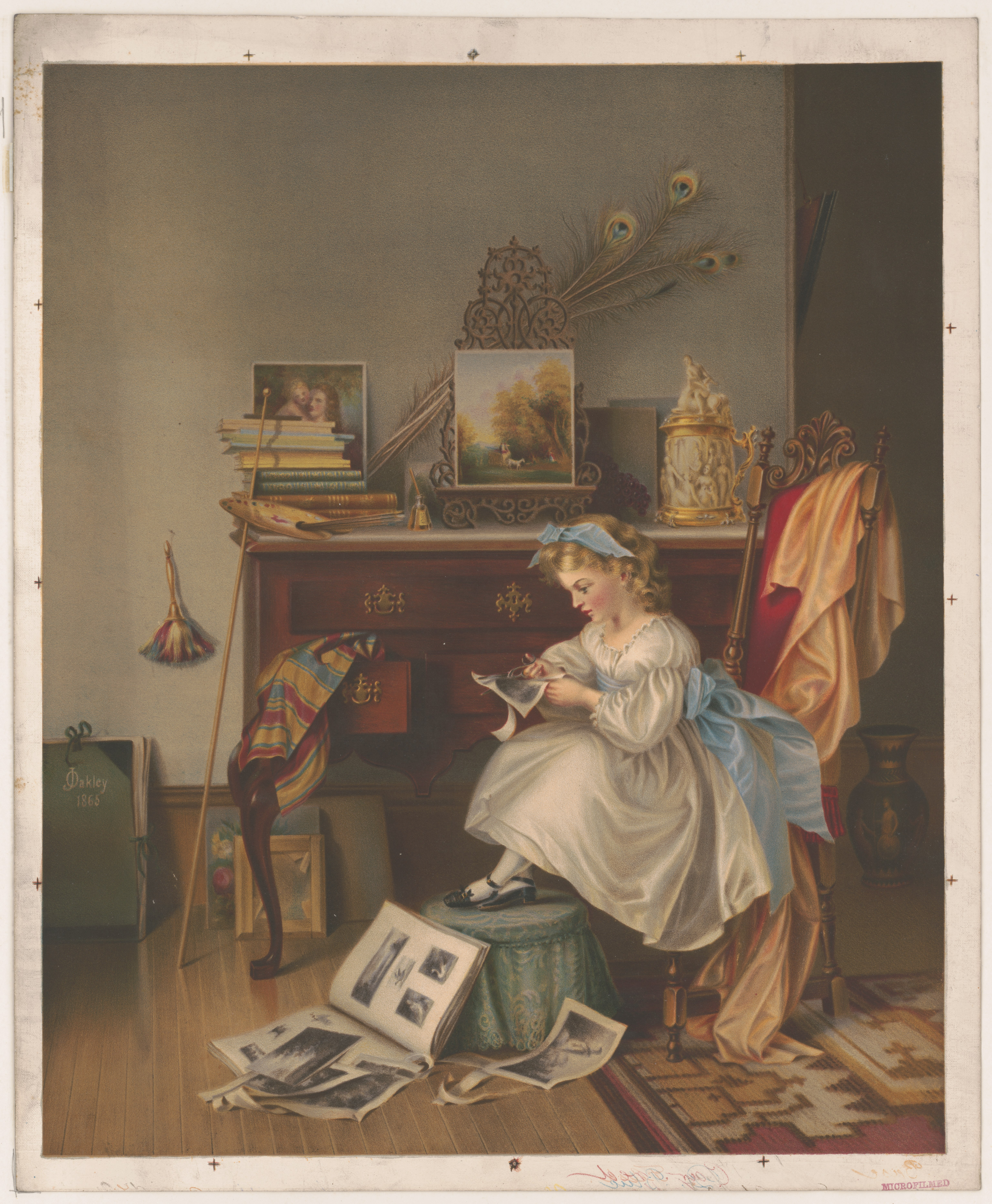
Making the scrap book

== Later reputation ==
"Prints depicting the Civil War battles by Kurz and Allison are among the most sought after collectibles of Civil War enthusiasts." according to the Martin Art Gallery, Muhlenberg College. In spite of their lack of historical accuracy, Kurz and Allison prints (or details from them) are still used as book covers and iconic images of the Civil War.

== Illustrations ==
Kurz & Allison images illustrate Grandest Century in the World's History by Henry Davenport Northrop

== Gallery ==
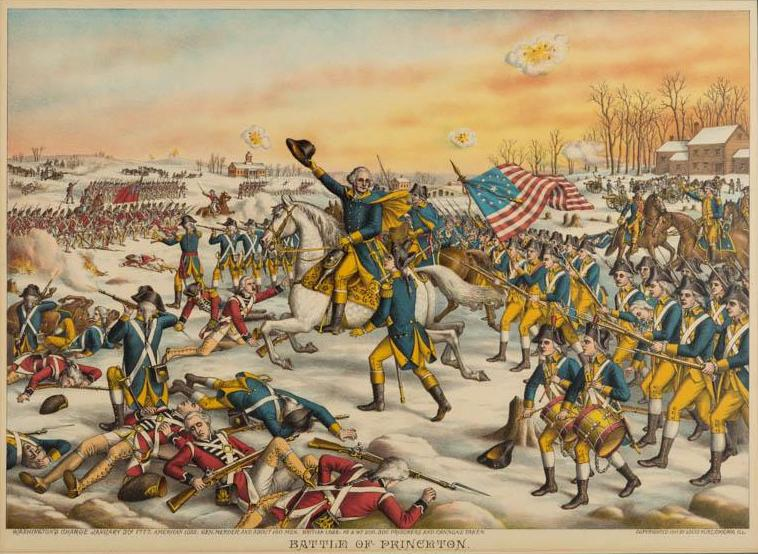
Battle of Princeton

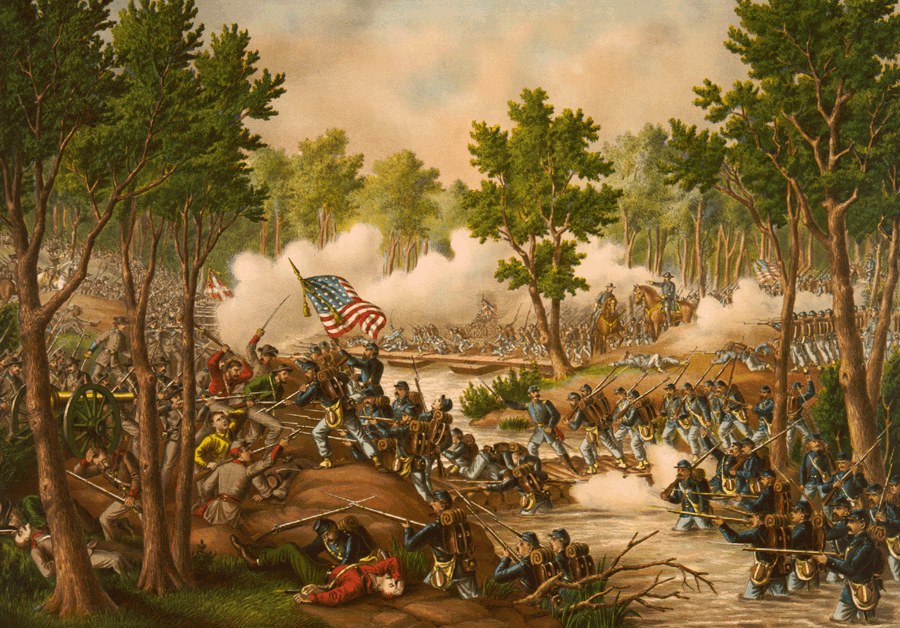
Battle of Spotsylvania

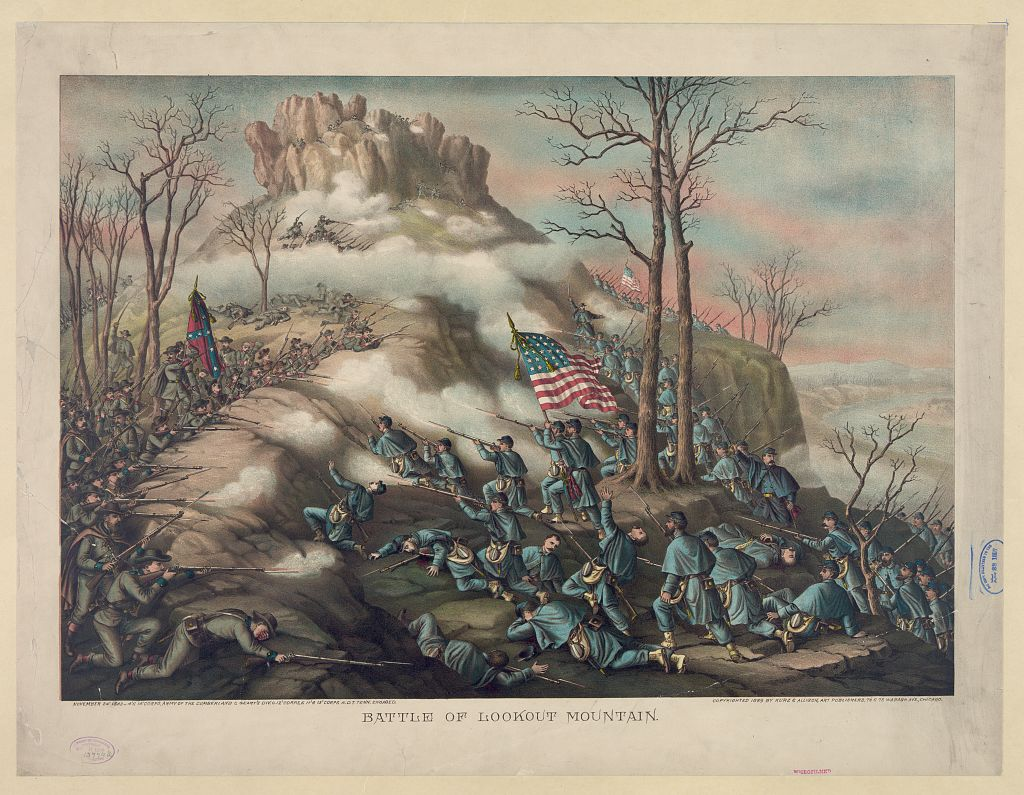
Battle of Lookout Mountain

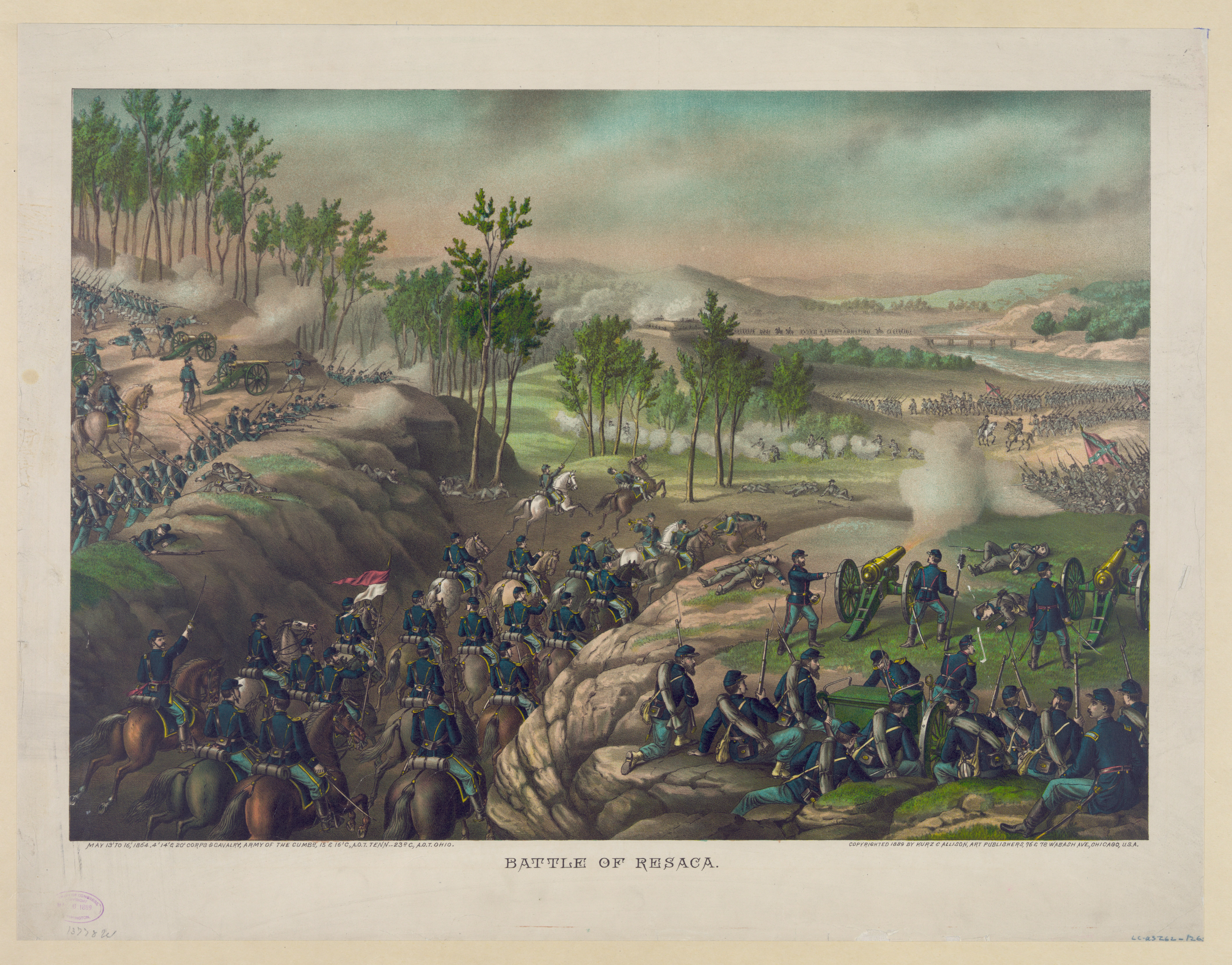
Battle of Resaca

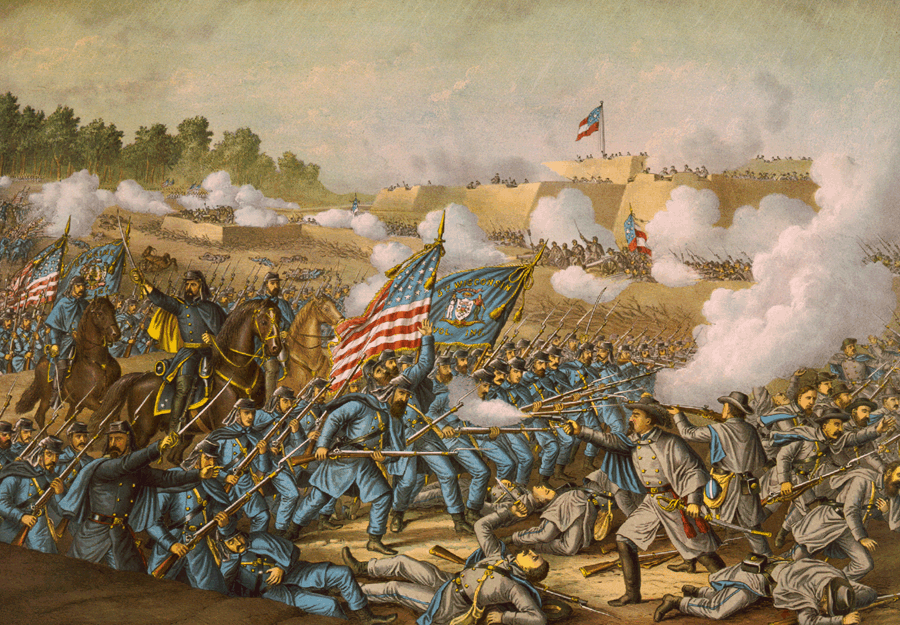
Battle of Williamsburg

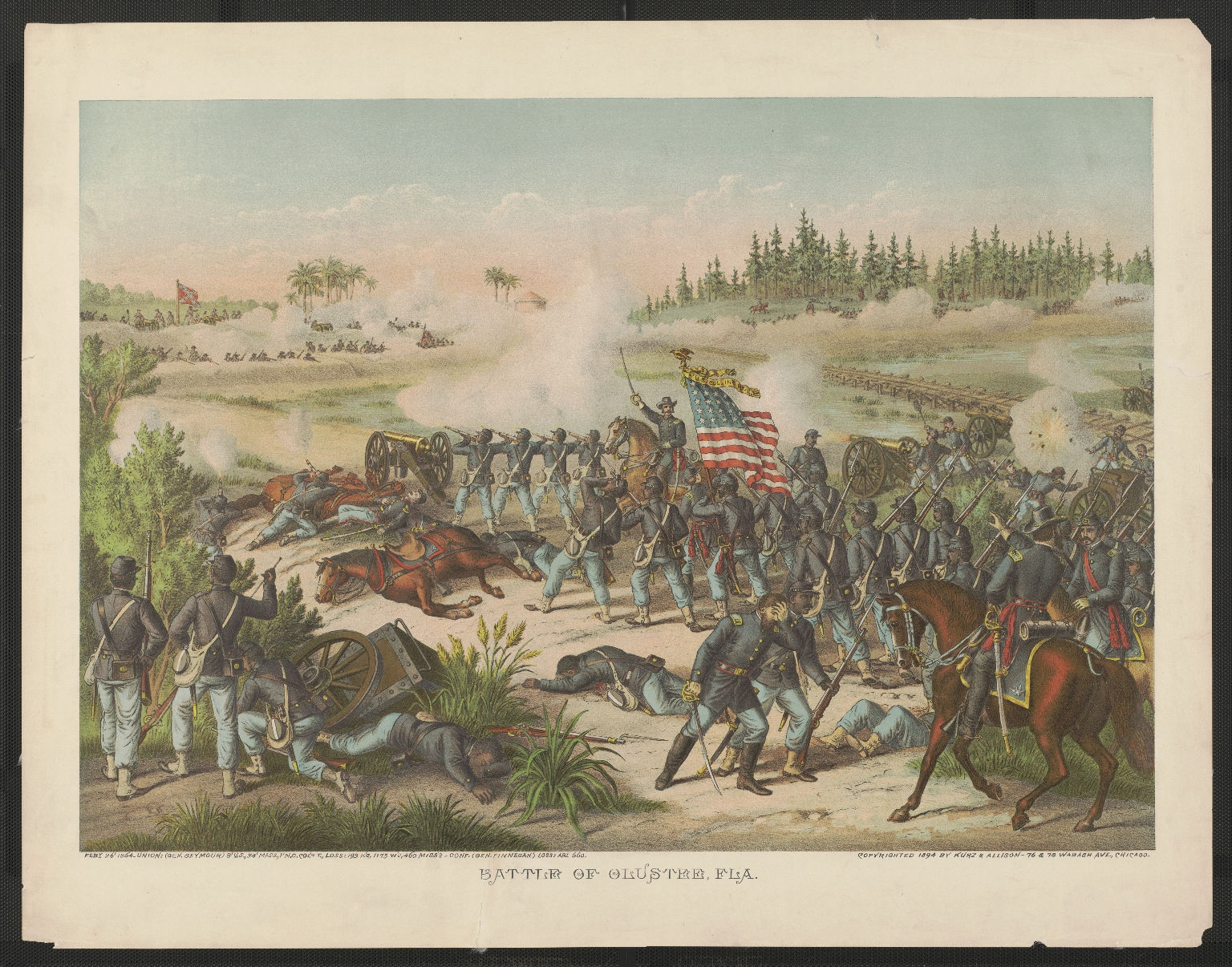
Battle of Olustee

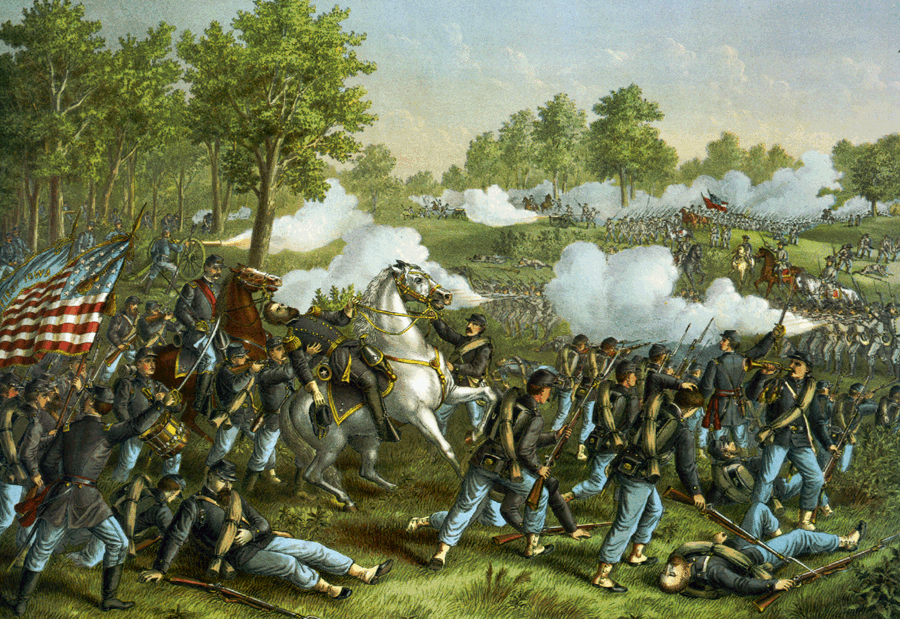
Battle of Wilson's Creek

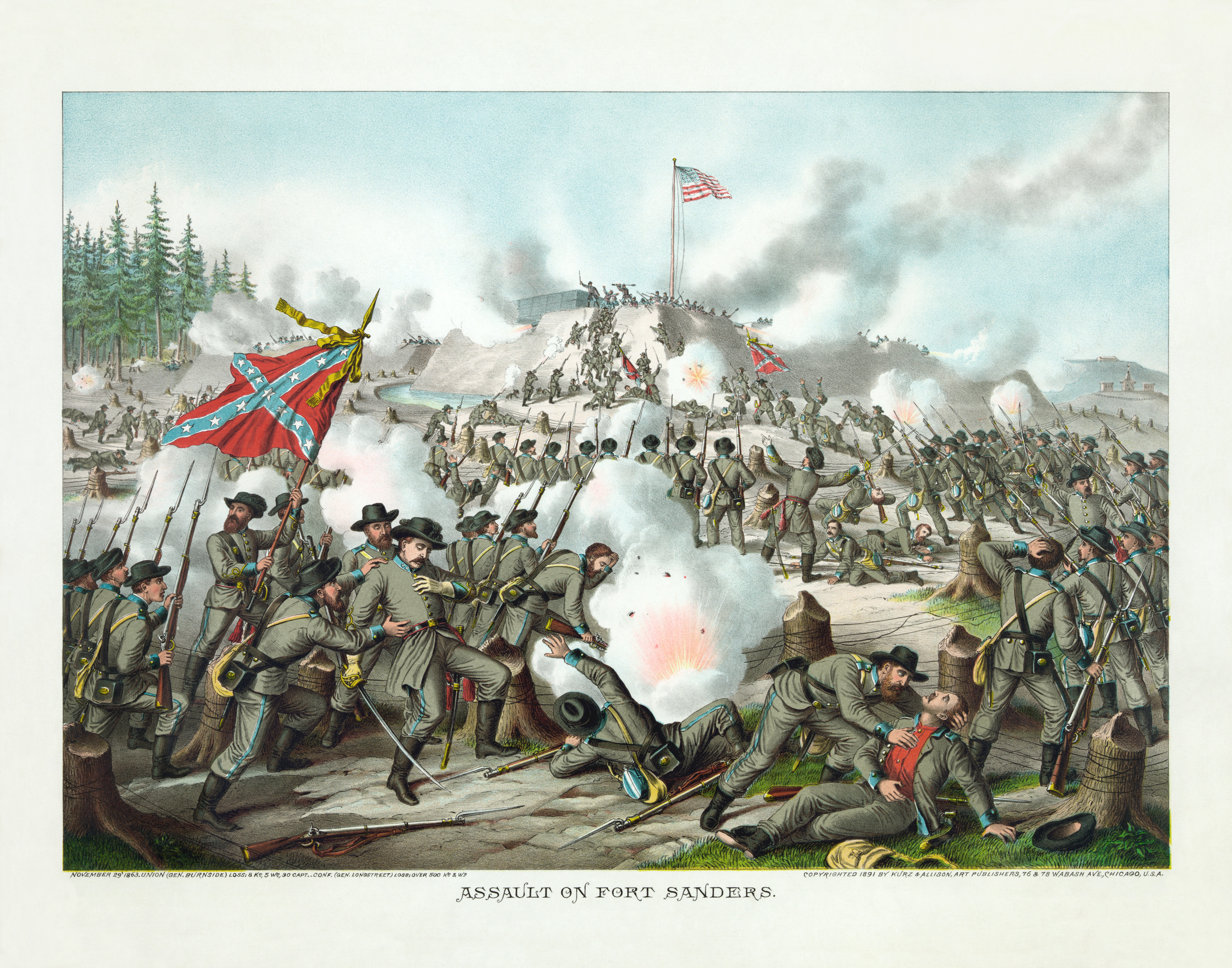
Battle of Fort Sanders

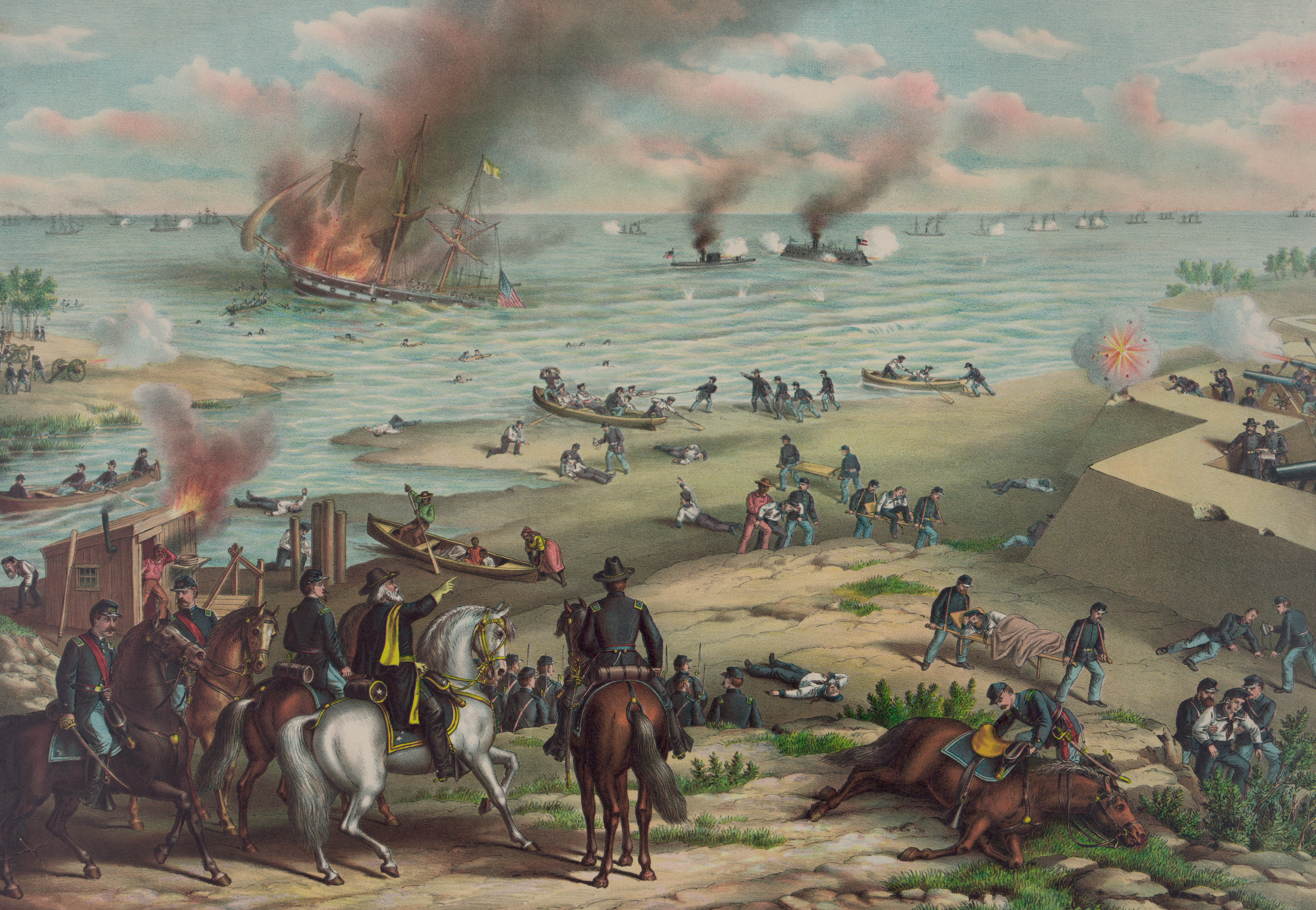
Battle of Hampton Roads

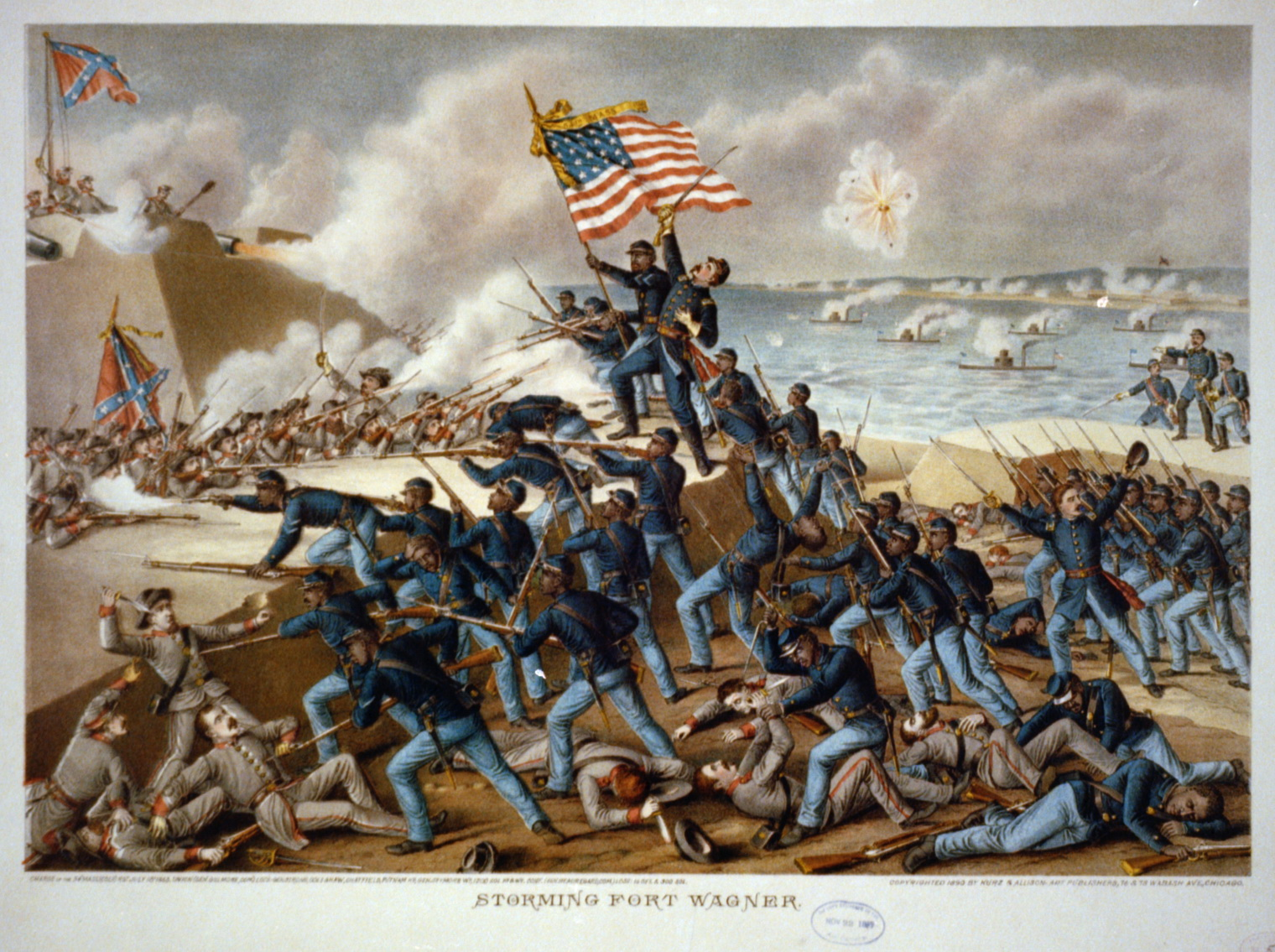
Storming Fort Wagner

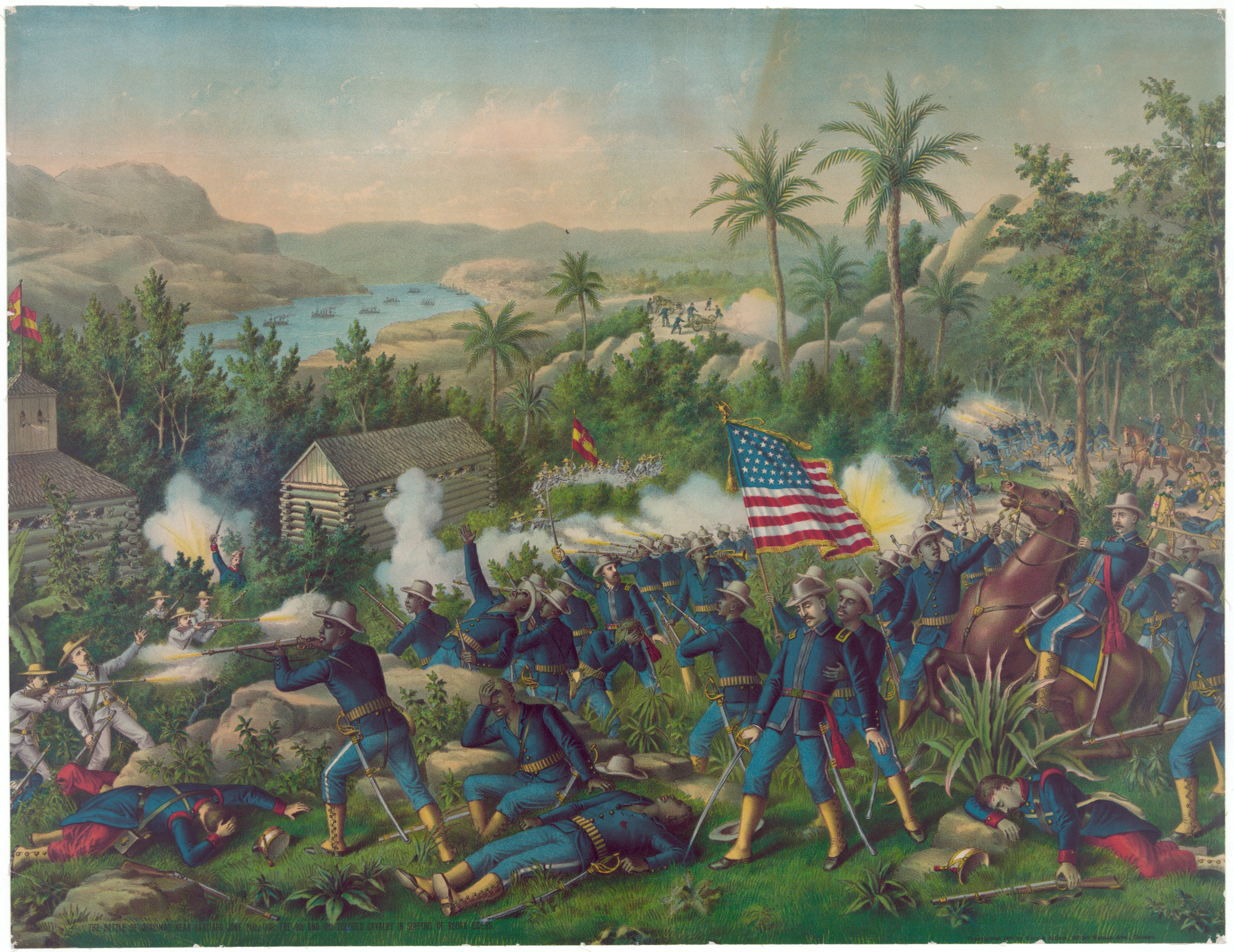
Battle of Las Guasimas

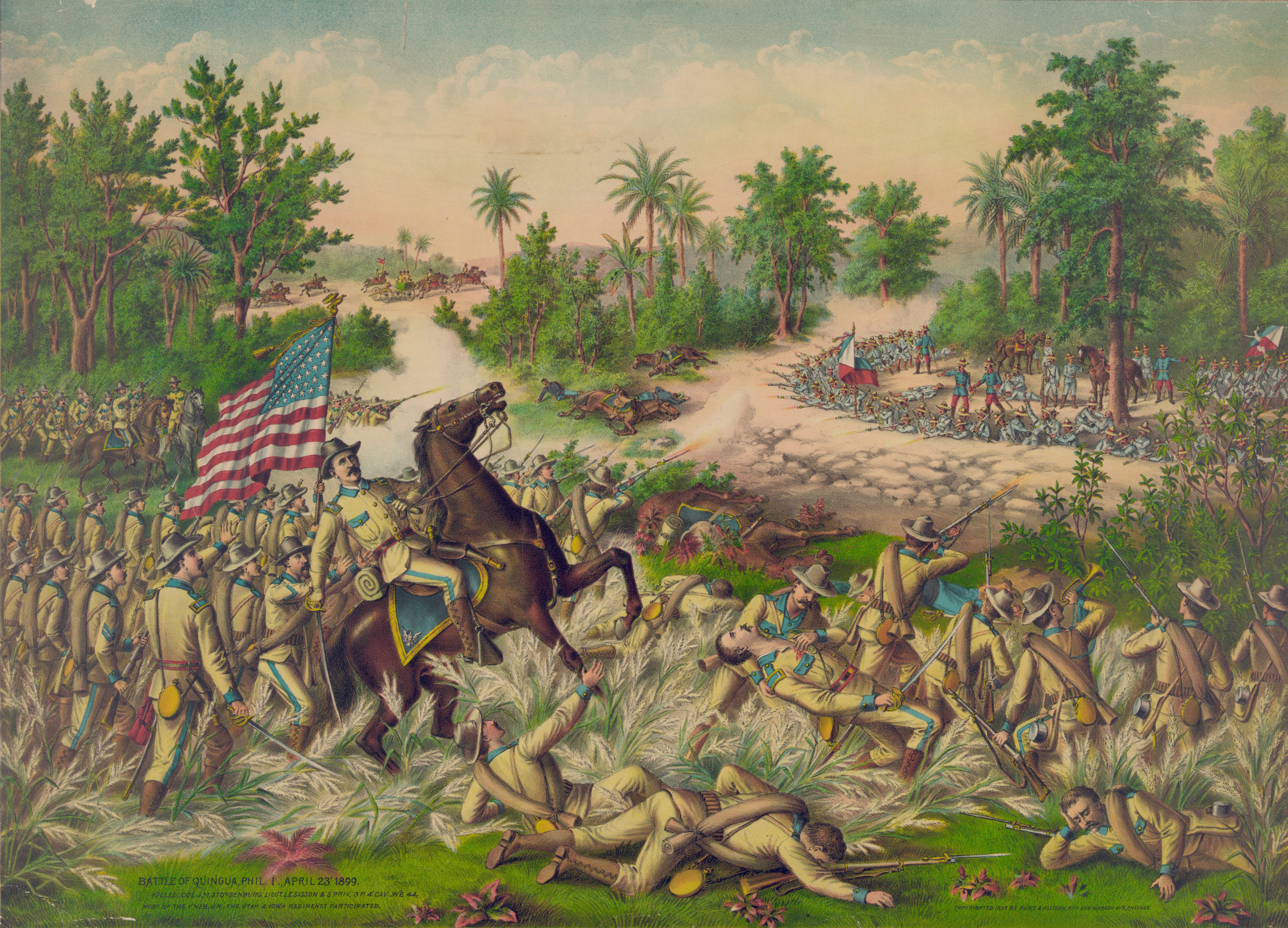
Battle of Quingua

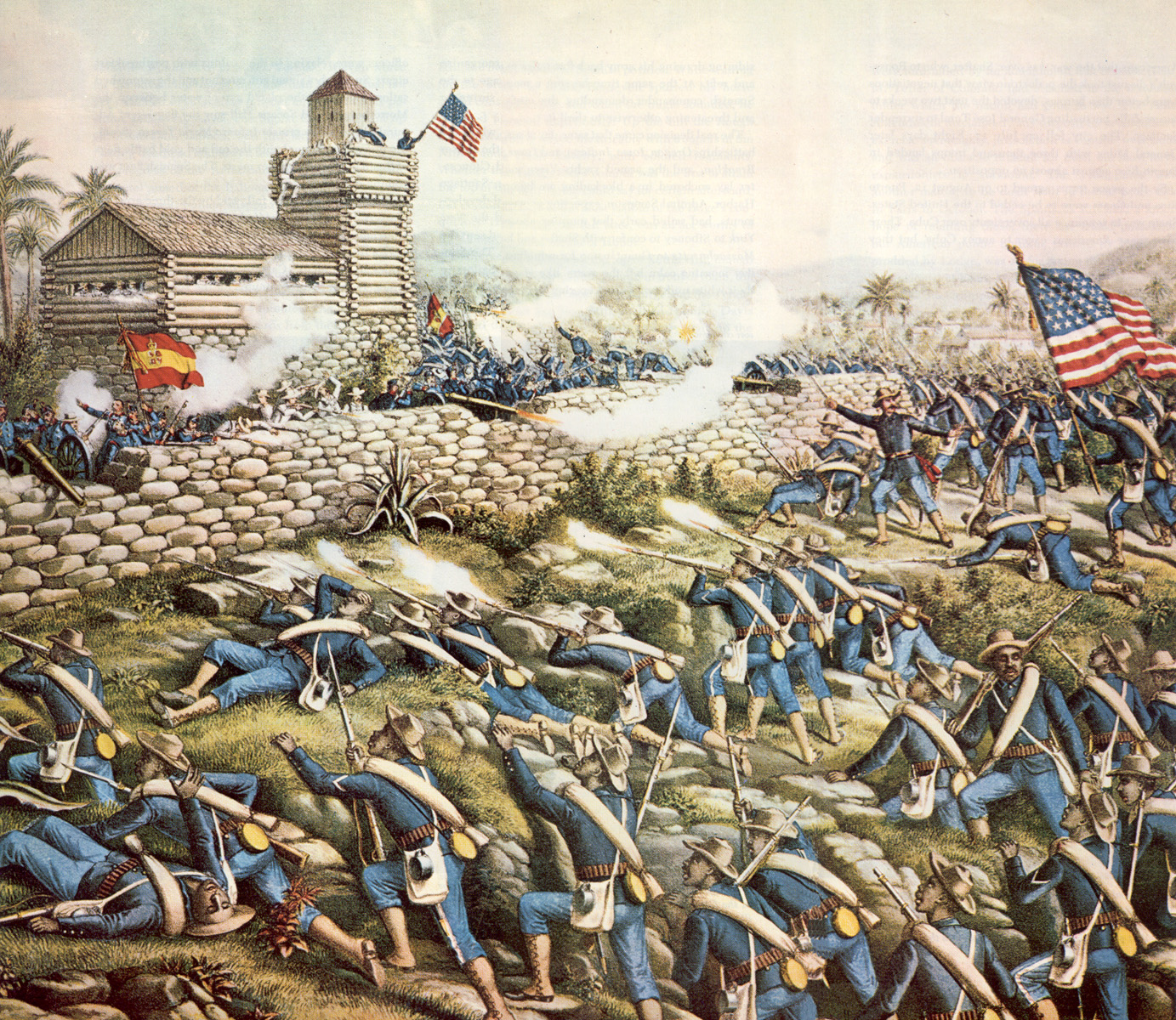
Battle of San Juan Hill

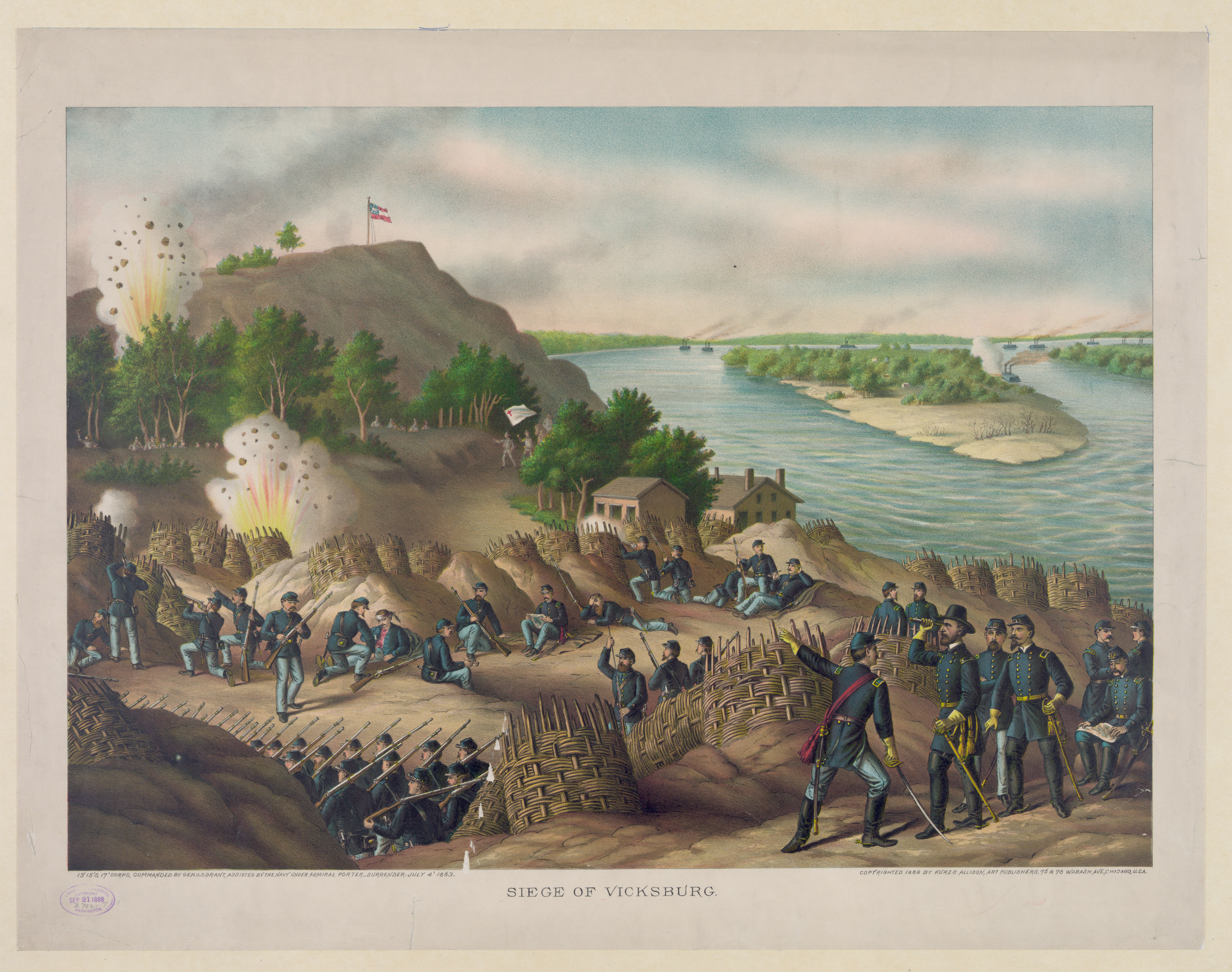
Siege of Vicksburg--13, 15, & 17 Corps, Commanded by Gen. U.S. Grant, assisted by the Navy under Admiral Porter--Surrender, July 4, 1863, by Kurz and Allison (circa 1888)

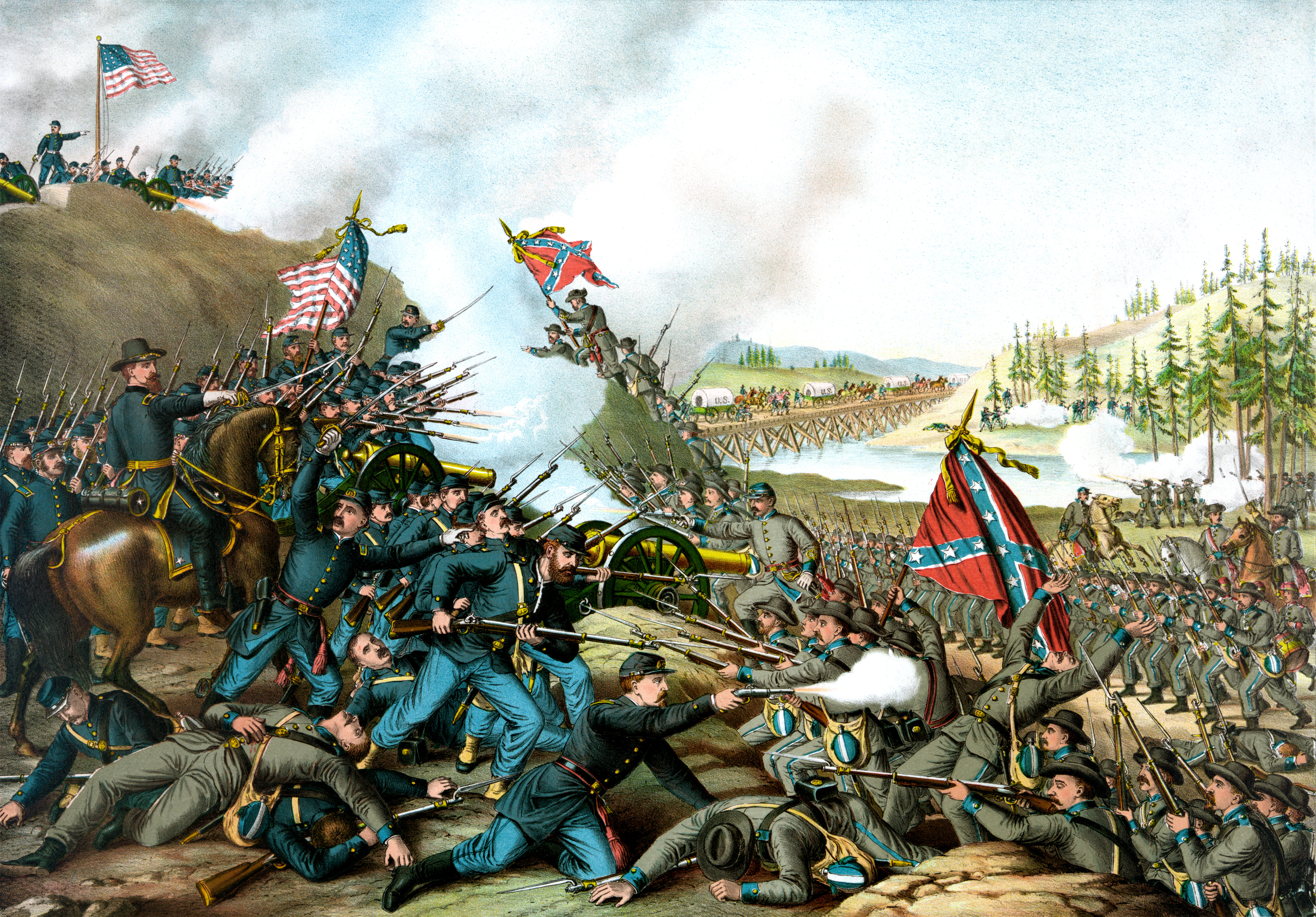
Battle of Franklin. November 30, 1864 (1891)

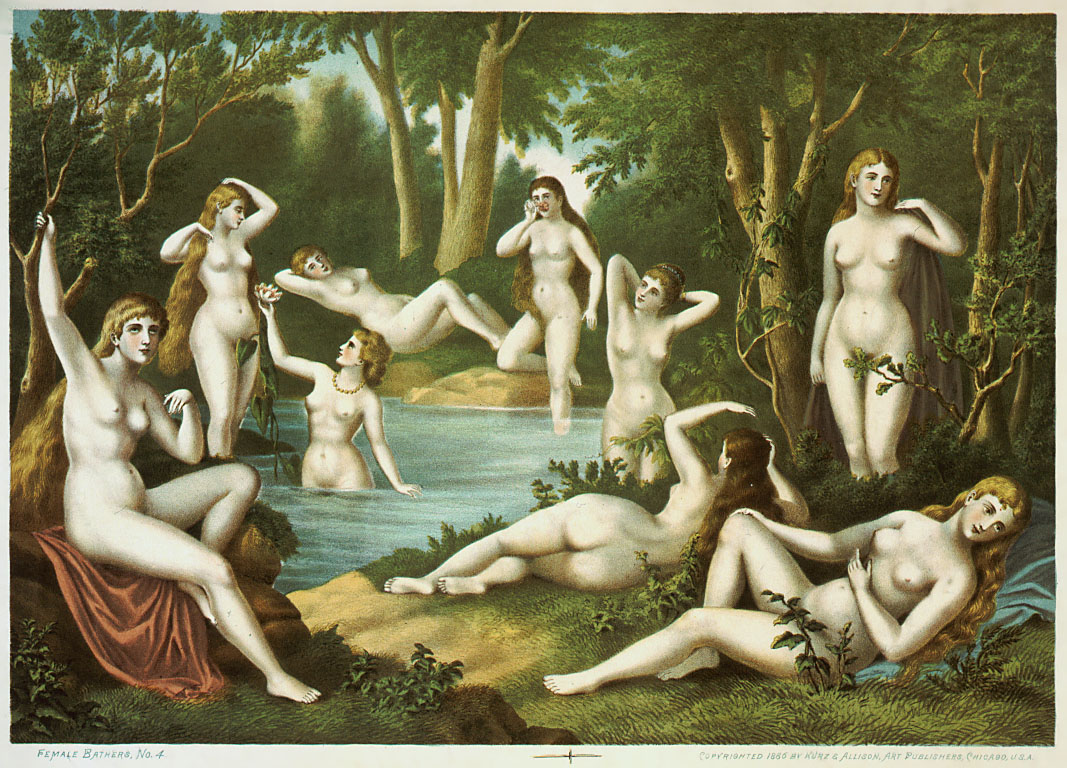
"Female Bathers No. 4" 1886

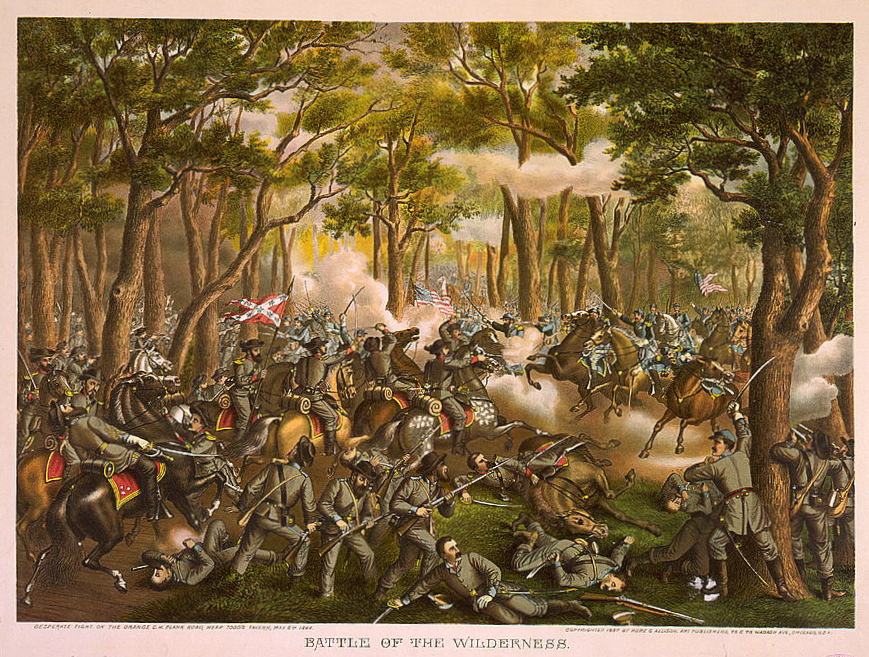
Battle of the Wilderness--Desperate fight on the Orange C.H. Plank Road, near Todd's Tavern, May 6th, 1864. Chromolithograph by Kurz & Allison. 1887

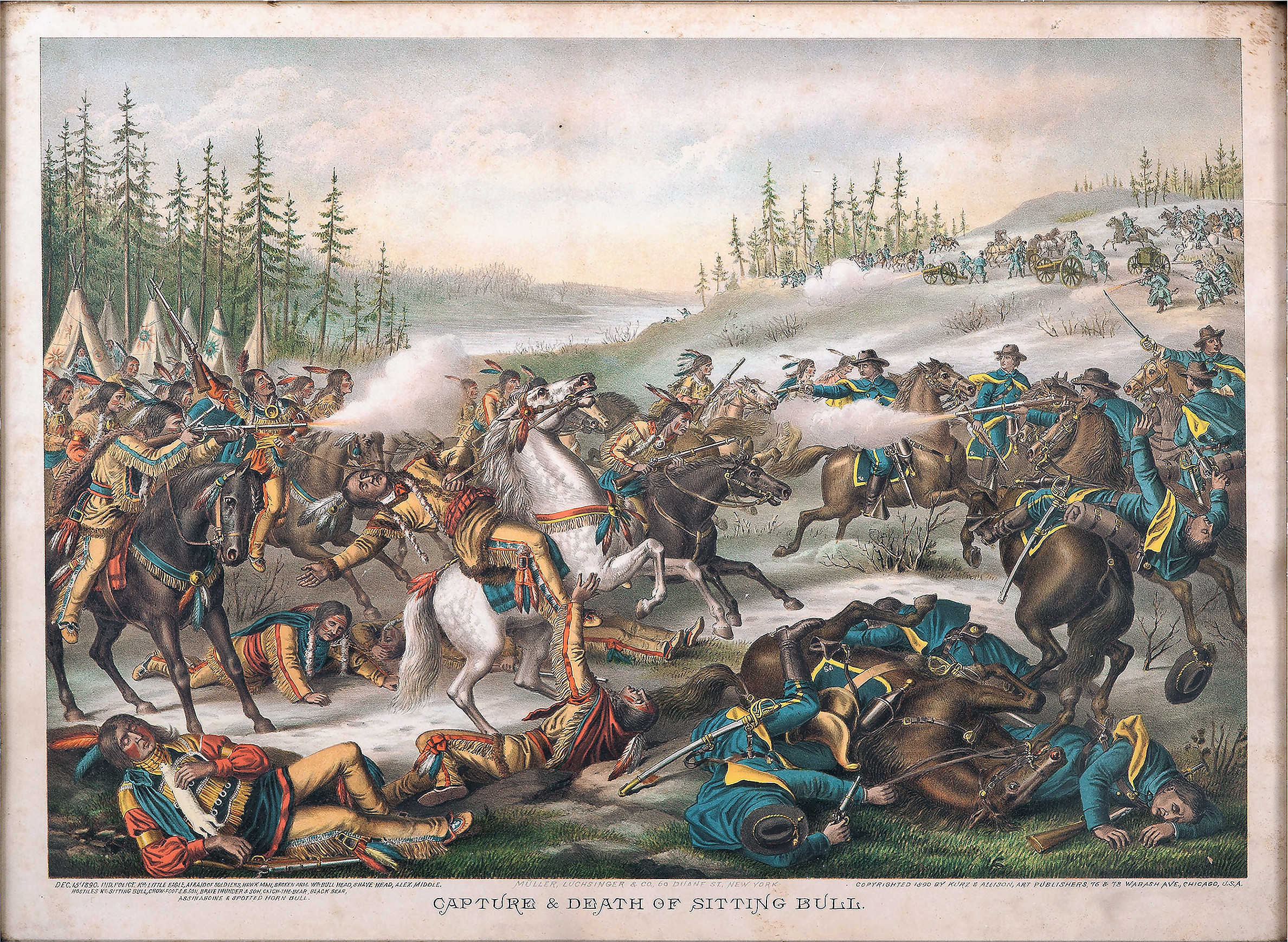
"Capture & Death of Sitting Bull" (1890)

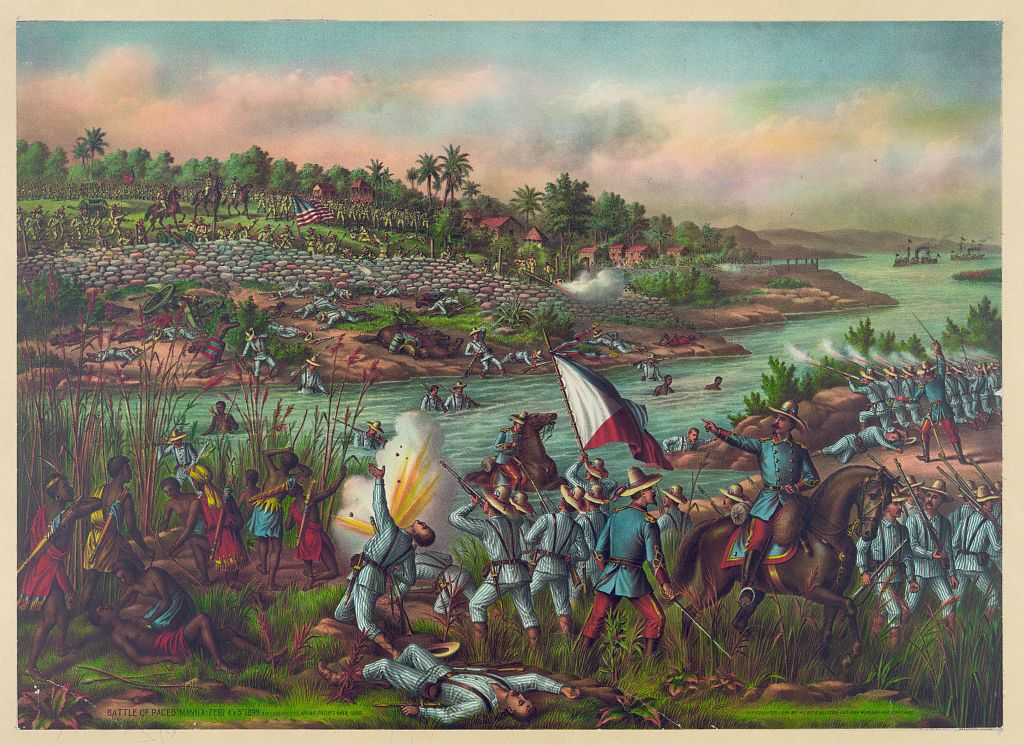
Battle of Manila, February 4-5 1899
