= List of Secret Millionaire (American TV series) episodes =

This is a list of episodes for Secret Millionaire. Secret Millionaire is a television series that aired on Fox for its first season and then on ABC for its remaining seasons. The show's first season ran from December 3 to December 18, 2008, and the second season ran from March 3 to April 10, 2011. The third season ran from June 3, 2012, to September 8, 2013.

The series originated in the UK. The concept of the series involves millionaires going undercover in impoverished communities and agreeing to give away tens of thousands of dollars. Members of the community are informed that the cameras are present to film a documentary. The U.S. version was much like the British and featured each week wealthy benefactors entering deprived neighborhoods of the United States incognito. They spend a week mingling within the community and live on a very low-cost budget. At the end of the show, the millionaires reveal their identities and proceed to donate at least $100,000 to the members of the community.

== Series overview ==
Season	Episodes	Originally released	
Season	Episodes	First released	Last released
1	6	December 3, 2008	December 18, 2008
2	6	March 6, 2011	April 10, 2011
3	13	June 3, 2012	September 8, 2013

== Episode list ==
"U.S. Viewers (millions)" refers to the number of Americans who viewed the episode on the day of its original broadcast.

=== Season 1 (2008) ===
No. overall	No. in season	Title	Directed by	Written by	Original release date	U.S. viewers (millions)
1	1	"Gregory and Cole Ruzicka"	N/A	N/A	December 3, 2008	N/A
Millionaire Gregory Ruzicka and his son, Cole, give out $125,000 plus toys in Imperial Beach, California.
2	2	"Gwen and Todd Graves"	N/A	N/A	December 3, 2008	N/A
The CEO of Raising Cane's Chicken Fingers gives out $300,000 plus a grill and playground goods in Plaquemines Parish, Louisiana.
3	3	"Cynthia and Myles Kovacs"	N/A	N/A	December 10, 2008	N/A
The co-founder of DUB gives out $150,000 and a new car.
4	4	"Gurbaksh Chahal"	N/A	N/A	December 11, 2008	N/A
Entrepreneur Gurbaksh Chanal gives out $110,000 in Tenderloin, San Francisco.
5	5	"Molly Shattuck"	N/A	N/A	December 17, 2008	N/A
Fitness entrepreneur Molly Shattuck gives out over $190,000 plus toys in Shenandoah, Pennsylvania.
6	6	"Gregory Haerr"	N/A	N/A	December 18, 2008	N/A
The CEO of Century Software gives out $150,000 in Las Vegas, Nevada.

=== Season 2 (2011) ===
No. overall	No. in season	Title	Narrated by	Directed by	Original release date	U.S. viewers (millions)
7	1	"Dani Johnson: Knoxville, Tennessee"	N/A	Bruce Ready	March 6, 2011	12.61
Wealthy entrepreneur Dani Johnson, once homeless and on welfare, spends a week in Knoxville, Tenn., in search of those who need her help most.
8	2	"Marc Paskin: Detroit, Michigan"	N/A	Bruce Ready	March 13, 2011	11.43
Once poor and working through college, real estate investor Marc Paskin spends a week in Detroit, Mich., giving to those in need.
9	3	"James Malinchak: Gary, Indiana"	N/A	Bruce Ready	March 20, 2011	10.29
From a small steel mill town in Indiana, motivational speaker James Malinchak spends a week in Gary (near Chicago), finding those who need help the most.
10	4	"John Ferber"	N/A	Bruce Ready	March 27, 2011	10.63
Entrepreneur John Ferber lives on welfare-level wages in L.A. searching for people making a difference in the lives of those less fortunate.
11	5	"Gary & Diane Heavin: Houston, Texas"	N/A	Bruce Ready	April 3, 2011	9.82
Curves CEOs Gary and Diane Heavin find three organizations to donate money to while spending a week living on $6.50 a day in Houston.
12	6	"Ali Brown: Venice, California"	N/A	Bruce Ready	April 10, 2011	9.33
Entrepreneur Ali Brown lives and volunteers among the homeless in Venice Beach.

=== Season 3 (2012–2013) ===
No. overall	No. in season	Title	Narrated by	Directed by	Original release date	U.S. viewers (millions)
13	1	"Scott and Alexa Jacobs: Newark, NJ"	Blair Underwood	Bruce Ready	June 3, 2012	5.66
Artist Scott Jacobs and his daughter Alexa spend their days in Newark, NJ to find charities to help with.
14	2	"Chuck Runyon and Dave Mortensen: Oklahoma City, OK"	Blair Underwood	Bruce Ready	June 10, 2012	5.36
Anytime Fitness founders Chuck Runyon and Dave Mortensen seek individuals deserving of their donations.
15	3	"Steve Kaplan: Chicago, IL"	Blair Underwood	Bruce Ready	June 24, 2012	5.04
Author Steve Kaplan visits Chicago seeking individuals deserving of donations.
16	4	"Hilary Decesare: Long Beach, CA"	Blair Underwood	Bruce Ready	July 1, 2012	5.66
Everloop CEO Hilary Decesare volunteers in a neighborhood in need and seek out people looking after people suffering.
17	5	"Jeff Usner: San Antonio, TX"	Blair Underwood	Bruce Ready	July 8, 2012	5.69
Self-made millionaire Jeff Usner heads to an impoverished area of San Antonio seeking individuals worthy of donations.
18	6	"Marcus Lemonis: Miami, FL"	Blair Underwood	Bruce Ready	July 15, 2012	3.80
Camping World CEO Marcus Lemonis returns to his hometown, Miami, seeking individuals worthy of donations.
19	7	"Sean Belnick: New York, NY"	Blair Underwood	Bruce Ready	August 5, 2012	3.97
24-year-old entrepreneur and BizChair.com owner Sean Belnick goes to Brooklyn, NY to find unsung heroes.
20	8	"Anne F. Beiler: Baltimore, MD"	Blair Underwood	Bruce Ready	August 4, 2013	5.15
Auntie Anne's Pretzels founder Anne Beiler spends a week working with grass roots organizations in Baltimore. Biler masqueraded as a volunteer at the food non-profit Moveable Feast, then made a donation to the charity.
21	9	"Jay Deutsch: Phoenix, AZ"	Blair Underwood	Bruce Ready	August 11, 2013	4.71
Self-made millionaire Jay Deutsch spends a week working with grassroots organizations in Phoenix.
22	10	"Debbie Johnston, Richmond, CA"	Blair Underwood	Bruce Ready	August 18, 2013	4.86
Debbie Johnston, owner of health-care agency Care Advantage, spends a week with grass roots organizations in Richmond, California.
23	11	"Amos Winbush: New Orleans, LA"	Blair Underwood	Bruce Ready	August 25, 2013	N/A
CyberSynchs CEO Amos Winbush III volunteers in New Orleans and surprises people in need with donations.
24	12	"Wing Lam: Mobile, AL"	Blair Underwood	Bruce Ready	September 1, 2013	N/A
Wahoo's Fish Taco co-founder Wing Lam travels to Mobile, Ala., seeking individuals worthy of donations.
25	13	"George & Kym Rapier: Oakridge, OR"	Blair Underwood	Bruce Ready	September 8, 2013	N/A
WellMed Medical Management, Inc. CEO George Rapier and his wife Kym travel to Oakridge, Oregon, donating over $1.3 million dollars to organizations and citizens of the city.

== See also ==
- Moveable Feast (organization)
