= Steven Kaplan =

Steven Kaplan may refer to:

- Steven Kaplan (economist) (born 1959), American professor at the University of Chicago Booth School of Business
- Steven Kaplan (historian), French historian at Cornell University
- Steven Kaplan (investor), American businessman and co-founder of Oaktree Capital Management
- Steven Kaplan (Pennsylvania official), Pennsylvania politician
- Steven G. Kaplan (born 1962), American film and television producer
- Steven H. Kaplan (born 1953), American professor of English and president of the University of New Haven
- Steve Kaplan (basketball), American-Israeli player on the Israel national basketball team
- Steve Kaplan (entrepreneur) (born 1960), American entrepreneur, author, public speaker
- Steve Kaplan (Africanist) (born 1953), American professor of African studies
- Steven Kaplan, actor in the 2009 film Bart Got a Room

== See also ==
- Stephen Kaplan (disambiguation)
