= Thomas Edison State University =

Public university in Trenton, New Jersey, US

Coordinates: 40.2203°N 74.7684°W

- Former name: Thomas Edison State College (1972–2015)
- Motto: Eruditio perpetua vitae (Latin)
- Motto in English: Learning throughout life
- Type: Public university
- Established: July 1972
- Accreditation: MSCHE
- President: Merodie A. Hancock
- Students: 13,880
- Location: Trenton, New Jersey, United States
- Campus: 140 acres (57 ha); Urban
- Colors: Burgundy and cream
- Website: tesu.edu

Thomas Edison State University (TESU) is a public university in Trenton, New Jersey, United States. The university is one of New Jersey's 11 senior public institutions of higher education. Thomas Edison State University offers degrees at the undergraduate and graduate level.

== History ==
Thomas Edison State College was approved by the New Jersey Board of Education in December 1971, and established on July 1, 1972. In 2015, the college was awarded university status. The school is named in honor of Thomas Alva Edison, the inventor who lived in New Jersey for the bulk of his adult life and gained encyclopedic knowledge of many subject areas through self-directed learning.

== Campus ==
Thomas Edison State University moved into downtown Trenton in September 1979, at a time when other institutions were leaving cities. The 7-year-old university, which had spent three years at the Forrestal Center outside of Princeton, needed room for growth. At the same time, the state was looking for an appropriate tenant for the landmark Kelsey Building located adjacent to New Jersey's State House complex and the State House historic district, while the city sought to preserve the building's historic use as a school. Behind the Kelsey Building and the adjoining five restored mid-19th-century brick Townhouses is Petty's Run, which flows to the Delaware River. In the early 1730s, Petty's Run powered a plating mill, and by midcentury drove a steel furnace.

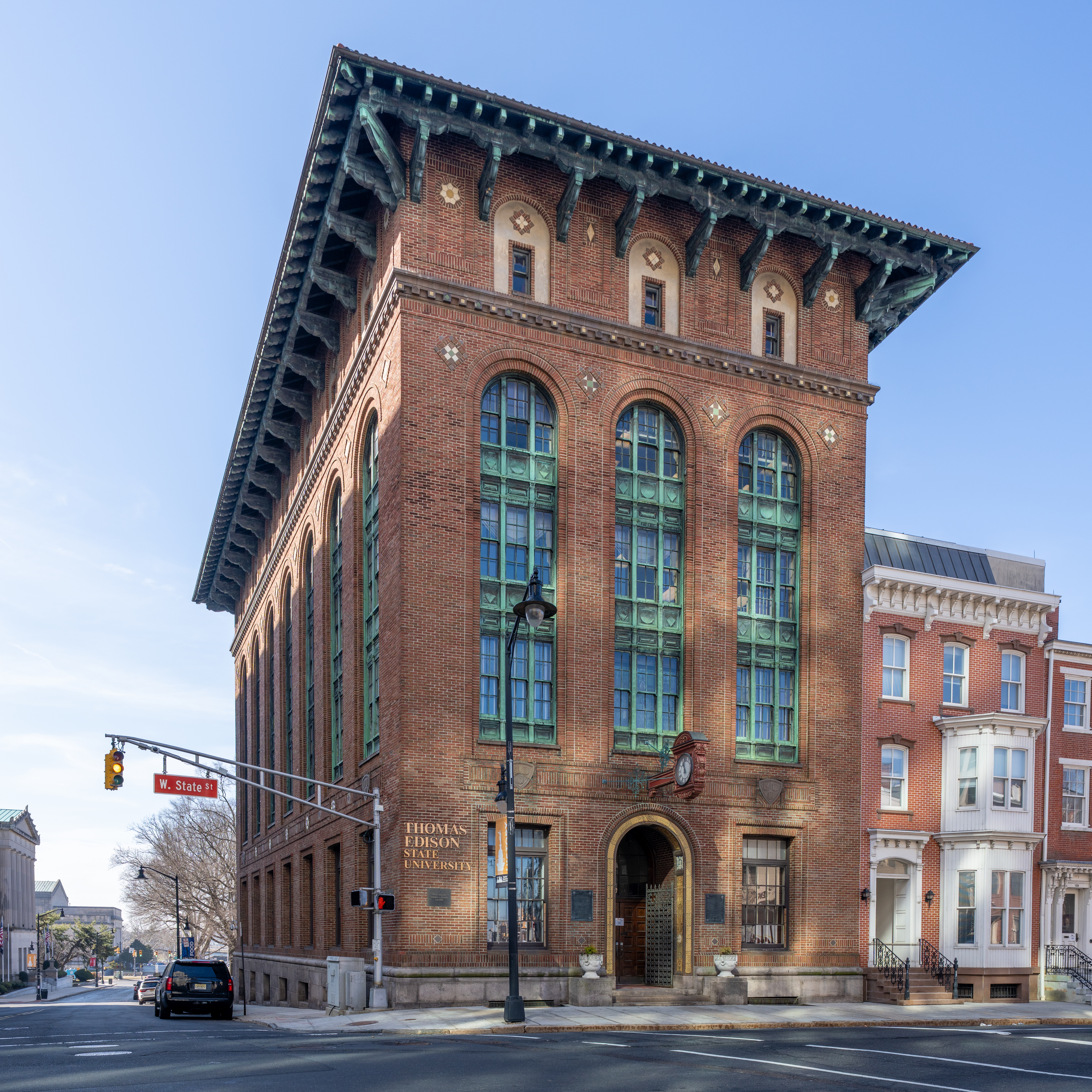
The Kelsey Building

Built in 1911 by A. Henry Cooper Kelsey, the Kelsey Building is one of the architectural landmarks of the city. It housed three other schools before serving as the headquarters for Thomas Edison State University. The architecture of the Kelsey Building is modeled after a Florentine palace, the Palazzo Strozzi. The main structure was designed in 1910 by world-renowned architect Cass Gilbert (designer of New York City's Woolworth Building). In 2011, the Kelsey Building celebrated its 100th anniversary.

The university's campus has grown over the years and currently includes the Kelsey Building, the Townhouse Complex, the Center for Learning and Technology, and Kuser Mansion, all on West State Street. The Academic Center and Canal Banks Building are located on West Hanover Street. TESU provides students with research library services through its affiliation with the New Jersey State Library, located near the campus.

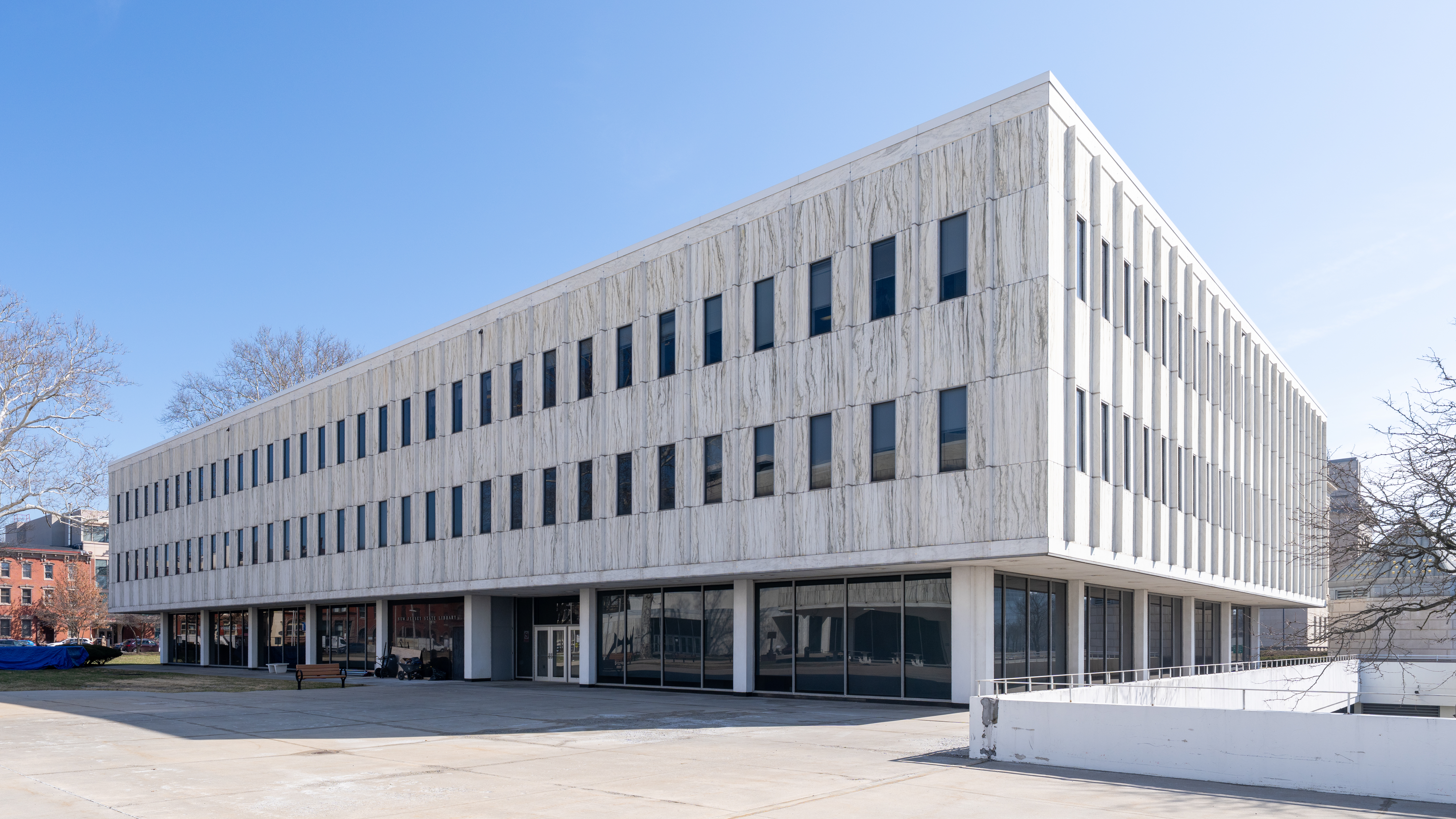
New Jersey State Library, an affiliate of Thomas Edison State University

Thomas Edison State University has been active in restoring several historic buildings of downtown Trenton, preserving the essence of the city's past and stimulating economic development. In 2013, TESU announced the completion of a new nursing simulation lab (funded by Bristol Myers Squibb). In 2016, the university celebrated the opening of the 34,360-square-foot Nursing Education Center at the site of the former Glen Cairn Arms apartment complex at West State and Calhoun streets.

== Artwork on campus ==
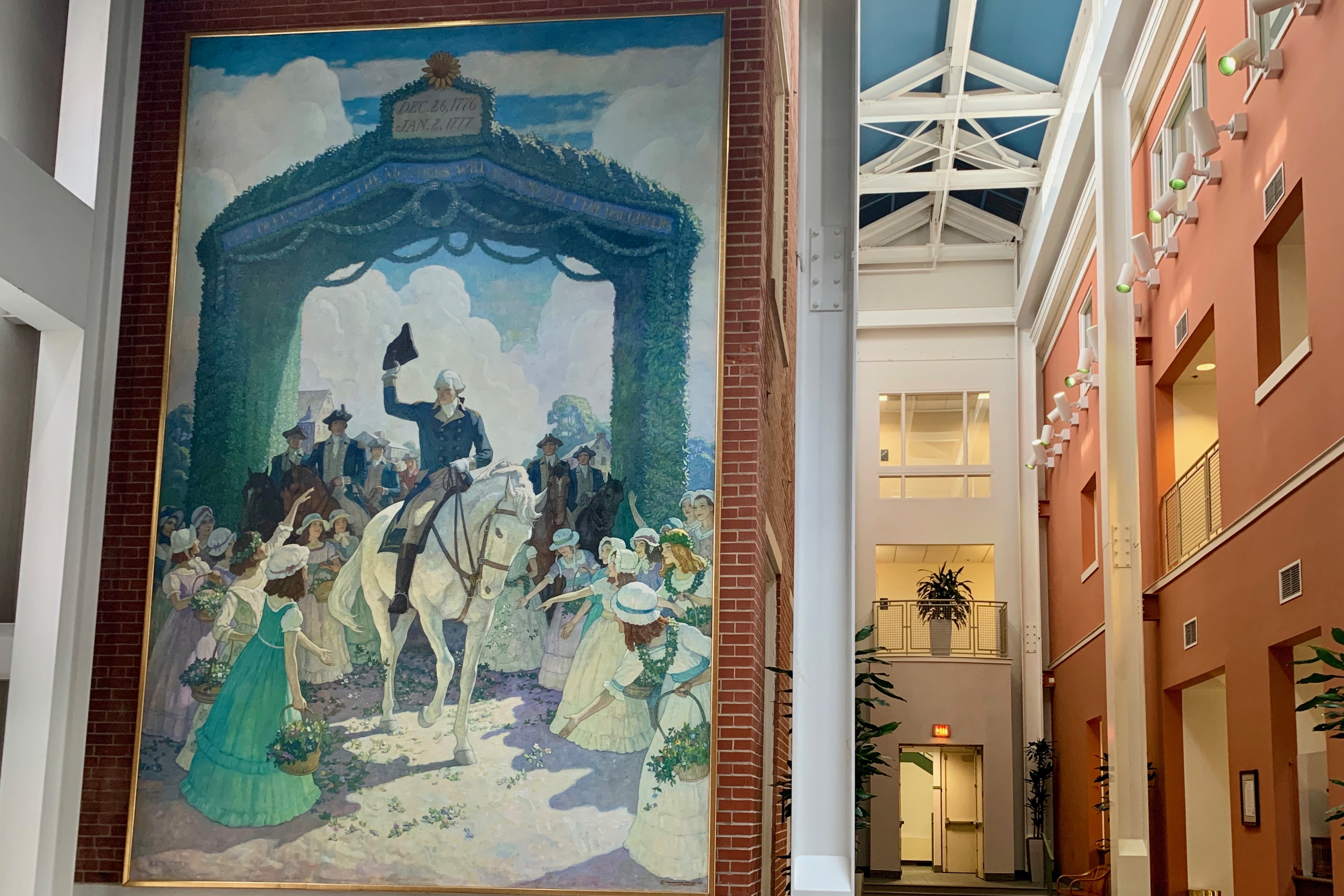
Painting by N. C. Wyeth, 1930, in the lobby

TESU houses a number of pieces of art including a N. C. Wyeth painting titled Reception to Washington on April 21, 1789, at Trenton on his way to New York to Assume the Duties of the Presidency of the United States, the Quantum Ring sculpture, a bronze map of Trenton, and plaques in tribute to Thomas Edison, along with two collections. Inside the Kelsey Building, a lavishly decorated room was built as a special tribute to Prudence Townsend Kelsey. The Prudence Townsend Kelsey Memorial Room is a permanent exhibit space for the porcelain and art she and her husband, Henry Cooper Kelsey, collected on their annual trips to Europe." Paintings, porcelains and bronzes on display in the Memorial Room. The majority of the collections consists of souvenirs and mementos purchased by the Kelsey's on their annual trips abroad. Some of the items housed in the room include an asparagus shaped porcelain vial, a jewel Demitasse cup and saucer by Coalport, charms, vases and several pieces of porcelain and crystal from Austria, England, Germany, France and Ireland.

The Bradshaw Collection by George A. Bradshaw is displayed in the Kelsey Building's Prudence Hall. The university often hosts tours of these collections which are also viewable by appointment. In addition to being displayed at Thomas Edison State University, Bradshaw's etchings are in the permanent collections of the Library of Congress, the New York Public Library, the Vanderpoel Gallery in Chicago, Newark Museum, the University of Nebraska and many private collections.

In 2019, Wells Fargo donated the painting by Wyeth portraying George Washington's reception at Trenton to TESU, the largest gift ever given to the university.

== Academics ==
Undergraduate demographics as of Fall 2023
Race and ethnicity	Total
White	45%
Black	15%
Hispanic	15%
Unknown	15%
Asian	5%
Two or more races	4%
International student	1%
Economic diversity
Low-income (Note: The percentage of students who received an income-based federal Pell grant intended for low-income students.)	20%
Affluent (Note: The percentage of students who are a part of the American middle class at the bare minimum.)	80%

Thomas Edison State University offers associate, bachelor's, master's, and doctoral degrees in more than 100 areas of study. The university also offers undergraduate, graduate and noncredit certificates. Academic programs at the institution are housed in five schools:

- Heavin School of Arts and Sciences
- School of Applied Science and Technology
- School of Business and Management
- W. Cary Edwards School of Nursing and Health Professions
- John S. Watson School of Public Service

== Accreditation ==
The university is accredited by the Middle States Commission on Higher Education (MSCHE); it has been accredited by MSCHE or its predecessor organization since 1977. Several programs are also accredited:

- The W. Cary Edwards School of Nursing programs at Thomas Edison State University are approved by the New Jersey Board of Nursing, the Accrediting Commission for Education in Nursing (ACEN) and the Commission on Collegiate Nursing Education (CCNE).
- The school's Master of Arts in Educational Leadership Program is accredited by The Teacher Education Accreditation Council (TEAC).
- The Thomas Edison State University bachelor's degree programs in Electronic Systems Engineering Technology and Nuclear Energy Engineering Technology are accredited by the Engineering Technology Accreditation Commission of ABET.
- Thomas Edison State University's associate degree program and undergraduate certificate in Polysomnography is accredited by the Commission on Accreditation of Allied Health Education Programs (CAAHEP).
- The School of Business and Management's Bachelor of Science in Business Administration, Master of Business Administration, Master of Science in Management and Master of Science in Human Resources Management degree programs are accredited by the Accreditation Council for Business Schools and Programs (ACBSP).

== Student media ==
Invention is the magazine of Thomas Edison State University. It keeps alumni, supporters, students and friends informed of news from the university, including new programs and services, special events and alumni profiles and updates.

== Notable people ==
=== Alumni ===
The university has more than 60,000 alumni worldwide.

- Peter Baldacchino, prelate of the Roman Catholic Church, who has served as the bishop of the Diocese of Las Cruces in New Mexico since 2019.
- Arthur C. Brooks, Harvard University professor, economist, and president of the American Enterprise Institute
- Mike Davis, head coach of the Detroit Mercy Titans men's basketball team
- Lauren Hart, Philadelphia Flyers, national anthem singer
- Walter E. Fountain, United States Army Major General, Assistant Adjutant General of the Oklahoma Army National Guard
- Gary Heavin, founder and CEO of Curves International
- Steven L. Herman, South Asia bureau chief and a radio/TV correspondent for Voice of America
- Daniel Knudsen, director and actor
- Tom Luna, former Idaho Superintendent of Public Instruction
- Raj Mukherji, attorney and businessman serving as a Senator representing New Jersey's 32nd District
- Michael D. Reynolds, astronomer, former faculty member at Florida State College at Jacksonville
- Alex Riley, attorney serving as a member of the Missouri House of Representatives from the 134th District
- Kristina Sisco, director and actress
- Bonnie Watson Coleman, Congresswoman and former Majority Leader of the New Jersey General Assembly
- Isaac Wright Jr., lawyer
- Jamie Grosshans, justice of the Supreme Court of Florida since 2020
- Caroline Harris Davila, member of the Texas House of Representatives from the 52nd District
- Bob Kulp, businessman and former member of the Wisconsin State Assembly from the 69th District
- Robert I. Marshall, member of the Delaware Senate from the 3rd District from 1979 to 2019

=== Faculty ===
- Cynthia Baum, clinical psychologist and academic administrator
- Penelope Schott, poet and professor
