= Denis Crossan =

- Born: Glasgow, Scotland
- Education: Glasgow School of Art; National Film and Television School
- Occupation: Cinematographer
- Years active: 1986-present
- Website: www.deniscrossan.com

Denis Crossan, BSC is a Scottish cinematographer.

== Life and career ==
Crossan was born in Glasgow, and studied graphic design at the Glasgow School of Art and cinematography at the National Film and Television School in Beaconsfield.

He started his career shooting numerous music videos and commercials with major directors and advertising agencies. This earned him a number of awards for cinematography, including Clio Awards, Creative Circle Awards and D&AD.

In 1993, he joined the British Society of Cinematographers.

== Filmography ==
=== Film ===
Year	Title	Director	Notes
1986	Highlander		Additional photography
1990	Silent Scream	David Hayman	
1992	Blue Ice	Russell Mulcahy	
1993	The Real McCoy	Russell Mulcahy	
1994	Nostradamus	Roger Christian	
1996	Killer Tongue	Alberto Sciamma	
1997	I Know What You Did Last Summer	Jim Gillespie	
1997	Incognito	John Badham	
1998	The Clandestine Marriage	Christopher Miles	
2001	The Hole	Nick Hamm	
2001	Me Without You	Sandra Goldbacher	
2003	Agent Cody Banks	Harald Zwart	
2004	Agent Cody Banks 2: Destination London	Kevin Allen	
2009	The Pink Panther 2	Harald Zwart	
2015	Urban Hymn	Michael Caton-Jones	
2016	Billionaire Ransom	Jim Gillespie	
2018	Asher	Michael Caton-Jones	
2019	Our Ladies	Michael Caton-Jones	
2019	The Gentlemen	Guy Ritchie	Additional photography
2022	Prey for the Devil	Daniel Stamm	

=== Television ===
Year	Title	Notes
1989	Screen Two	Episode: "Leaving"
1993	ScreenPlay	Episode: "Boswell and Johnson's Tour of the Western Isles"
2014	Outlander	2 episodes
2015	The Bastard Executioner	2 episodes
2016	Stan Lee's Lucky Man	2 episodes
2018	Into the Badlands	2 episodes
2018	Doctor Who	2 episodes
2019	Curfew	2 episodes
2025	The Rig	3 episodes

TV movies and miniseries

Year	Title	Director
1991	A Murder of Quality	Gavin Millar
2012	World Without End	Michael Caton-Jones
2017	The Loch	Brian Kelly
2018	Next of Kin	Jamie Childs
2022	The Love Box in Your Living Room	Daniel Kleinman
