= D-Tox =

2002 film

- Theatrical release poster
- Directed by: Jim Gillespie
- Screenplay by: Howard Swindle
- Story by: Ron L. Brinkerhoff
- Based on: Jitter Joint by Howard Swindle
- Produced by: Ric Kidney
- Starring: Sylvester Stallone; Tom Berenger; Charles S. Dutton; Polly Walker; Sean Patrick Flanery; Dina Meyer; Robert Patrick; Robert Prosky; Courtney B. Vance; Jeffrey Wright; Kris Kristofferson
- Cinematography: Dean Semler
- Edited by: Tim Alverson; Steve Mirkovich
- Music by: John Powell; Irman SA
- Production companies: Universal Pictures; KC Medien; Capella International
- Distributed by: DEJ Productions (North America); United International Pictures (International)
- Release dates: February 1, 2002 (United Kingdom); September 20, 2002 (United States)
- Running time: 96 minutes
- Country: United States
- Language: English
- Budget: $55 million
- Box office: $6.4 million

D-Tox is a 2002 American action film directed by Jim Gillespie and starring Sylvester Stallone. The supporting cast features Tom Berenger, Charles S. Dutton, Polly Walker, Robert Patrick, Stephen Lang, Jeffrey Wright, Courtney B. Vance and Kris Kristofferson. The film had a limited release in the United States on September 20, 2002, under the title Eye See You by DEJ Productions.

== Plot ==
While FBI agent Jake Malloy pursues a serial killer who targets police officers in Seattle, his former partner becomes a victim. While Malloy is at his partner's home, the killer calls him from Malloy's home. The killer says Malloy pursued him earlier for a series of prostitute murders; as revenge, he kills Mary, Malloy's girlfriend. Malloy pursues the killer, only to find that he appears to have committed suicide. Three months later, Malloy descends into alcoholism. After a suicide attempt, Malloy's best friend and supervising officer, Agent Chuck Hendricks, enrolls Malloy in a rehabilitation program for law enforcement officers run by Dr. John "Doc" Mitchell, a former cop and recovering alcoholic. Hendricks stays in Wyoming to ensure Malloy will be okay.

Malloy meets several other officers who are patients in the clinic, including Peter Noah, an arrogant and paranoid ex-SWAT officer; Frank Slater, a cynical British police officer; Willie Jones, a religious homicide detective; Jaworski, a narcotics cop who attempted suicide; Lopez, a temperamental LAPD officer; and McKenzie, an elderly member of the Royal Canadian Mounted Police who witnessed his partner's murder. He meets several staff members, including Doc's assistant and mechanic Hank and compassionate resident psychiatrist and nurse Jenny Munroe, with whom Malloy develops a bond.

A blizzard seals everyone in the rehab center without outside communication. Jenny finds the body of Connor, a troubled patient who apparently killed himself, but Jenny believes Connor would have sought help. The next morning Hank finds another apparent suicide, but Malloy believes otherwise. Doc locks up the surviving patients while he reviews their files. Jenny informs Doc that Jack Bennett, an orderly who was a former patient, is missing. After an axe-wielding man kills Doc, everyone but Malloy and Jenny suspect Jack. Malloy returns the cops' sidearms. Hendricks finds a dead cop in a frozen lake and returns to the clinic with the owner of a nearby fishing shop.

Hank, the clinic's cook Manny, and helper Gilbert, volunteer to drive through the blizzard to get help. While driving away, Hank veers away from something. The truck slides off the icy road and crashes. Malloy and Jenny hear the crash, and Malloy hands a gun to Jenny before investigating. Malloy finds Manny murdered and also found Jack's body, which caused the crash. Gilbert flees while Malloy rushes back to the clinic.

The killer electrocutes McKenzie, deactivating the building's power and heating system. Malloy forces everyone except Jenny to their cells, realizing a murderer is impersonating a cop. Suspecting this is Mary's killer, Malloy finds evidence on Connor's body to support this. As Malloy and Jenny return to the cells, Hank, suspecting Malloy, knocks him out. He locks Malloy in Slater's cell and releases everyone else.

Malloy finds a matchbook in Slater's cell from a Seattle restaurant frequented by cops, identifying him as the killer. Malloy realizes Slater has been observing him and other policemen he murdered at the restaurant. Malloy escapes and finds the missing badges above Slater's room, which he collects as trophies. After establishing his innocence, Malloy has Jones and Lopez conduct patrol while Jaworski stays with Jenny. Malloy heads into the tunnels beneath the facility. Unaware that Slater is the killer, Hank and Noah help him retrieve logs in the tunnels for heating. Slater convinces them to split up before killing each. As Malloy patrols the tunnels, Slater taunts him over a CB radio and lures Malloy to Noah's hanged body, where he finds the other radio. While leaving the clinic, Slater hears Jenny call Malloy. Malloy learns Slater is at the tunnel's trapdoor and rushes to save Jenny.

Outside the installation, Hendricks and the fishing shop owner find Gilbert alive and take him to the rehab center. Hendricks follows Jenny's footprints. Jenny runs to a nearby quonset hut, hiding from Slater. Malloy arrives, telling Jenny to stay inside the shed. Slater mistakenly catches Hendricks before Malloy catches him from behind. Slater jumps into the shed, knocks Jenny out, and wounds Hendricks. After a fight, Malloy finally kills Slater by impaling him to the spikes of a snow machine. Jenny regains consciousness and helps Hendricks walk to the clinic with Malloy. Malloy puts his engagement ring to Mary on a tree branch and walks away with Hendricks and Jenny.

== Cast ==
- Sylvester Stallone as Agent Jake Malloy
- Charles S. Dutton as Agent Chuck Hendricks
- Polly Walker as Jenny Munroe
- Kris Kristofferson as Dr. John "Doc" Mitchell
- Mif as Carl Brandon
- Christopher Fulford as Frank Slater
- Jeffrey Wright as Jaworski
- Tom Berenger as Hank
- Stephen Lang as Jack Bennett
- Alan C. Peterson as Gilbert
- Hrothgar Mathews as Manny
- Angela Alvarado Rosa as Lopez
- Robert Prosky as McKenzie
- Robert Patrick as Peter Noah
- Courtney B. Vance as Willie Jones
- Sean Patrick Flanery as Connor
- Dina Meyer as Mary
- Rance Howard as Geezer
- Tim Henry as Weeks

== Production ==
=== Development ===
In December 1997, it was announced a Brian Grazer produced film from Imagine Entertainment about Witness Protection starring Sylvester Stallone was in the process of being greenlit at Universal. In July 1998, the film was formally announced under the title of Detox with Jim Gillespie slated to direct from a script by Ron Brinkenhoff who'd previously worked as a staff researcher for Imagine.

=== Filming ===
The film was shot in Washington, D.C. and Vancouver.

=== Post-production ===
After the film was finished in 1999, Universal decided to screen it to a test audience but all the screenings of the first cut were met with negative reception from audiences. The film was then shelved for quite some time while re-shoots and story changes were being done. Composer John Powell wrote two complete scores for the film, one of which was rejected. With the film delayed and relegated to a European release by Universal due to the studio's dissatisfaction with the film in general, most of Powell's score was replaced with additional music by William Ross, Geoff Zanelli, and Nick Glennie-Smith as an attempt to make the film salvageable. A new ending was also filmed in which the main villain is killed in a different way. Even after re-shoots and title changes, Universal did not care for the film and after test screenings for the new version also got negative response from audiences, they shelved it. DEJ Productions acquired domestic distribution rights from Universal and released it over three years after it was originally finished but in a limited release. In an interview with Ain't It Cool News in December 2006, Sylvester Stallone was asked why the film did not get a wide release and then answered:

It's very simple why D-Tox landed in limbo. A film is a very delicate creature. Any adverse publicity or internal shake-up can upset the perception of – and studio confidence in – a feature. For some unknown reason the original producer pulled out and right away the film was considered damaged goods; by the time we ended filming there was trouble brewing on the set because of overages and creative concerns between the director and the studio. The studio let it sit on the shelf for many months and after over a year it was decided to do a re-shoot. We screened it, it tested okay, Ron Howard was involved with overseeing some of the post-production... but the movie had the smell of death about it. Actually, if you looked up, you could see celluloid buzzards circling as we lay there dying on the distributor's floor. One amusing note: It was funny, when we were met at the airport by the teamsters they'd have a sign in front of them saying DETOX, and all these actors like Kris Kristofferson, Tom Berenger and myself looked like we were going into rehab rather than a film shoot.

During the original filming of D-Tox in 1999, Sylvester Stallone became attached to star in another Universal produced film, an action horror entitled Fatalis. Written by novelist Jeff Rovin in 1998 and sold to Universal for over a million dollars, the script for the film concerned a huge pack of saber-toothed tigers who come back to life after an El Niño hurricane awakens them from being frozen inside an ancient sinkhole for thousands of years. They start attacking any humans they run into while moving down the mountains and through the woods before eventually attacking Los Angeles. Rovin, who wrote the novelization of Stallone's Cliffhanger (1993) and his biography, wrote Fatalis with Stallone in mind for the lead role of an anthropologist who, along with a female reporter he befriends, wants to capture the tigers alive as they are our last link with the past, however the local sheriff wants to destroy them. The film went into pre-production by 2000, but following the huge failure of D-Tox and Stallone's other films, Universal ceased production and it went unproduced, though Rovin later turned his script into very successful novel of the same name. Rovin did the same with Vespers, another cancelled action-horror film from around the same time, which would have focused on giant bats that attack New York City. When asked in 2021 about the chances of Fatalis being produced twenty years later, Rovin revealed that Stallone still owns the rights to the original story, and he suspects it will not be produced.

== Reception ==
=== Critical response ===
The film has an approval rating of 17% on Rotten Tomatoes based on 23 reviews, with an average rating of 3.5/10. The site's critical consensus reads, "Whether it's being presented as D-Tox or Eye See You, this Stallone starring vehicle is a slapdash thriller to actively avoid." Danny Graydon of BBC Films said: "Clearly, Hollywood's confidence in this film is lower than Pee-Wee Herman's Oscar chances, and their instincts are right: a boring, formulaic mix of serial killers and stalk'n'slash, this will not reinvigorate Sylvester Stallone's action hero status or loosen his maniacal destruction of the quality control button".
