= Chuck Huber =

American voice actor

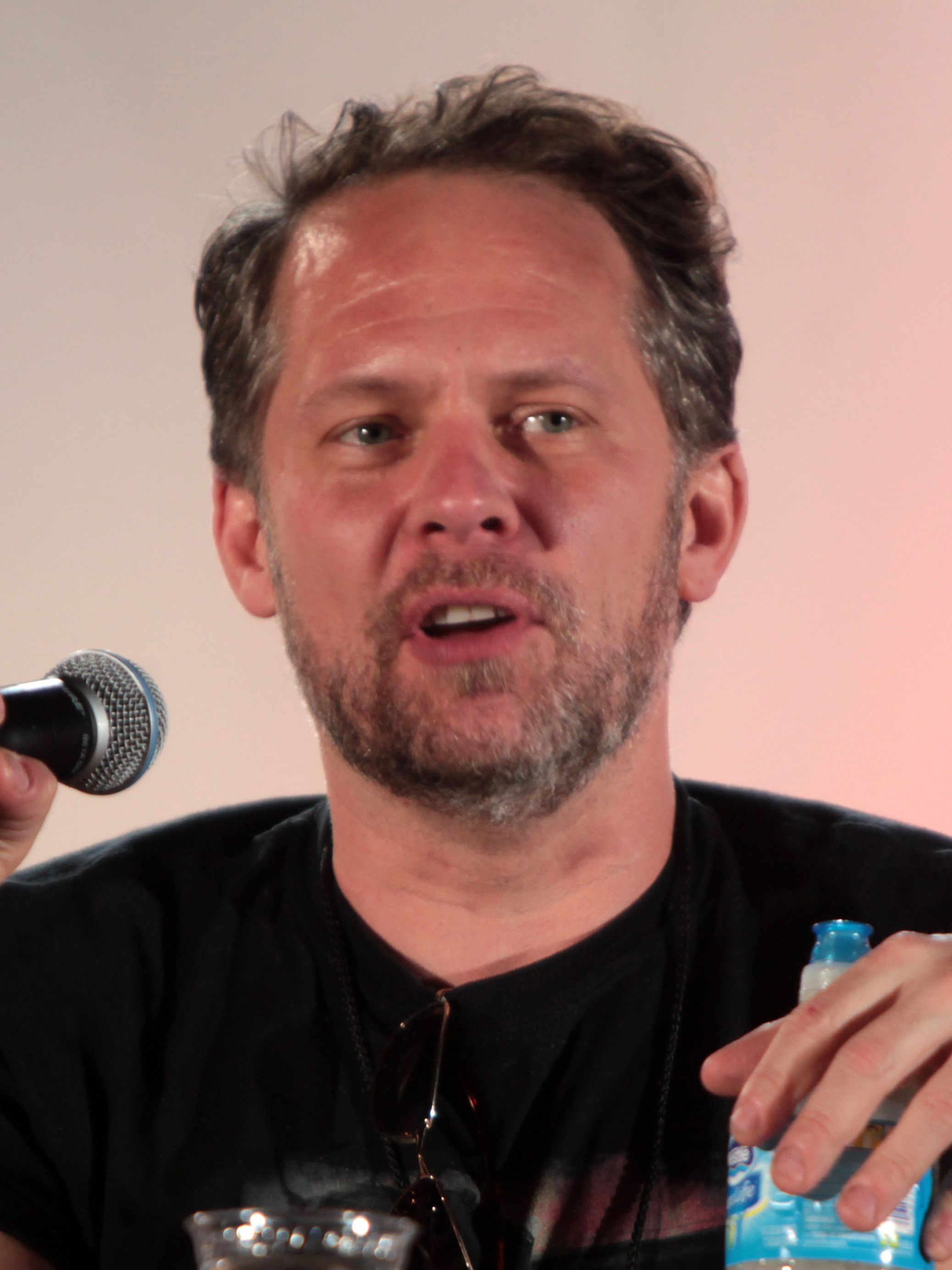
- Huber at the 2015 Phoenix Comicon
- Education: BFA, 1994, Theater Arts, DePaul University
- Occupations: Voice actor; ADR director; ADR script writer
- Years active: 2000–present
- Spouses: Kirsten Fischer (m. 1998–2014); Jessica von Braun (m. 2016)
- Children: 7

Chuck Huber is an American voice actor. He has provided numerous voices for Japanese anime series and video games. He is best known for his roles as Hiei in YuYu Hakusho, Dr. Franken Stein in Soul Eater, Pilaf in Dragon Ball, Shou Tucker in Fullmetal Alchemist, Android #17 in Dragon Ball Z and Turner Grey in Ace Attorney.

== Career ==
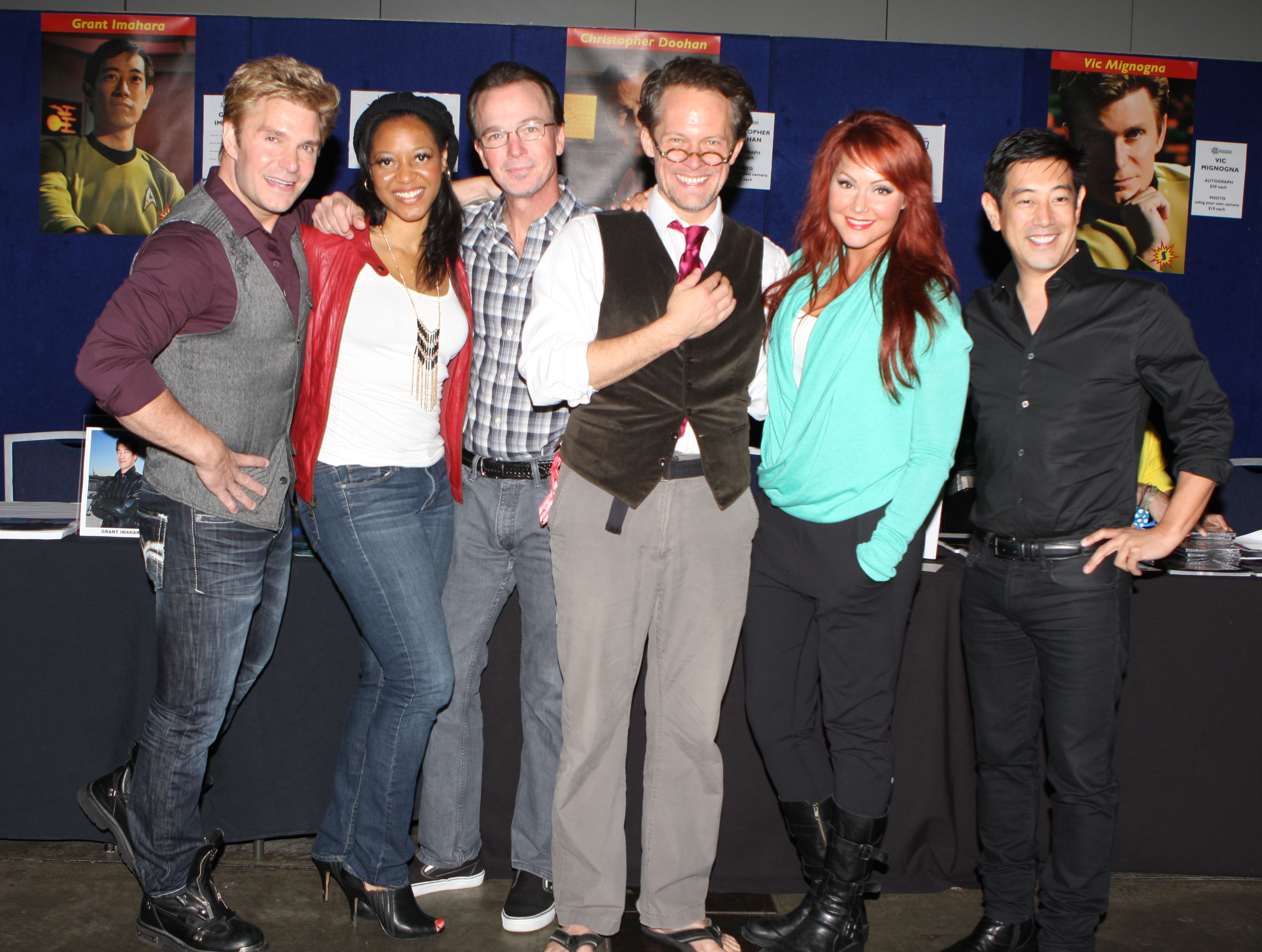
Huber (fourth from left) with the cast of Star Trek Continues

Huber has also been a TV, film and stage actor since 1989, most notably at Chicago's Steppenwolf and Goodman Theaters; as the Director/Writer of Arbor Day - The Musical; as a producer, co-writer and co-star of the bilingual feature Fragility of Seconds, which took the top prize at the Houston International Film Festival; as the editor and assoc. producer of Royal Shakespeare Company: Twelfth Night and in guest starring roles on NBC, FOX, CBS dramas.

Huber has also worked in the education field as a workshop leader, teacher and principal for 20 years in a variety of settings from Southern Methodist University's Cox School of Business to communities in Owerri, Nigeria; as a founder, consultant or board member for five different schools, and as an author of numerous articles for education periodicals, children's books, plays and screenplays.

== Personal life ==
On December 15, 2010, Huber suffered a heart attack. As a self-employed actor, he had no medical insurance. However, many friends and fans made donations to help cover the expenses. He has since made a full recovery.

Huber was previously married to Kirsten Fischer, with whom he has six children. In 2015, Huber became engaged to artist Jessica von Braun and they married in November 2016. They welcomed their first child together in 2024.

== Filmography ==
=== Live-action ===
- American Crime – Dean Hanson
- Amerigeddon - Colonel Kashoid
- Arbor Day the Musical - (Writer, Director, DP, Editor)
- The Crossroads of Hunter Wilde - Baal
- The Deep End - Harris - Pilot Episode
- The Fragility of Seconds - Ray Stewart (Writer, Producer)
- Going All the Way - Glen
- The Harrowing - Detective Swinton
- The Mechanical Grave - Officer Harris
- Missing Persons - Captain Daniels
- Odd Man Out - Matt Turner
- Parkland - Hugh Jameison
- Star Trek Continues – Leonard McCoy, 11 episodes
- Texas Night Train - Jake
- The Troubadoors - Mr. Douglas, S1 Ep7 (DP, Assoc. Producer, Editor)
- Twelfth Night - (Producer, Editor)
- The Untouchables - Beckman S1; Ep 7, 8
- Vindication - Craig Hamilton S1, Ep 2

=== Voice acting ===
==== Anime ====
Year	Title	Role	Notes	Source
2000–2002	Dragon Ball Z	Android #17, Kibito, Garlic Jr.	Funimation dub	
2000	Dragon Ball Z: The History of Trunks	Android #17	Funimation dub TV Special	
2001–2003	Dragon Ball	Pilaf, Master Shen	Funimation dub	
2002–2005	YuYu Hakusho	Hiei		
2003	Dragon Ball GT	Android #17, Hell Fighter #17, Super #17, Pilaf, Kibito	Funimation dub	
2004–2006	Fullmetal Alchemist	Shou Tucker		
2006	Crayon Shin-Chan	Hiro Nohara		
2008–2019	A Certain Magic Index	Aleister Crowley		
2009	D.Gray Man	Reever Wenhamm	also Hallow	
2009	Spice and Wolf	Martin Leibert	ADR script	
2009	Gunslinger Girl	Dr. Bianchi		
2009	Baccano	Ronny Sukiart	ADR script	
2009	Tower of Druaga: the Aegis of Uruk	Melt		
2009	Sgt. Frog	Kururu		
2010	Hetalia	Austria		
2010	Soul Eater	Franken Stein		
2010	Initial D	Yuichi Tachibana		
2010	Sekirei	Hiroto Minaka		
2011	Black Butler	Ash Landers	season 1	
2011	Ga-Rei: Zero	Kiriya Konpal		
2011	Dragon Ball Z Kai	Android #17, Kibito		
2012	Level E	Kyushiro Yumeno		
2012	Shakugan no Shana	Kantaro Sakai	seasons 2–3	
2012	Fractale	Hawker		
2013	La storia della Arcana Famiglia	Jolly		
2014	Fairy Tail	Bluenote Stinger		
2014	Red Data Girl	Professor Souda		
2016	The Disastrous Life of Saiki K.	Kuniharu Saiki		
2016	Castle Town Dandelion	Shiro Kusunoki		
2016	Servamp	Kuro		
2016	Trickster	Takumi Miyanishi		
2016	Escaflowne	Jajuka	Funimation dub	
2017–2019	Dragon Ball Super	Android #17, Pilaf, Kibito	Funimation dub	
2017–2025	My Hero Academia	Kurogiri		
2017	Hand Shakers	Tazuna's father		
2017	Alice & Zoroku	Ryu Naito		
2017	Endride	Shun's father		
2017	Juni Taisen: Zodiac War	Michio		
2017	Ai no Kusabi	Raoul		
2018	B't X	Groupie	Anime Midstream dub	
2025	Dragon Ball Daima	Kibito		

==== Film ====
Year	Title	Role	Notes	Source
2000	Dragon Ball: Mystical Adventure	Master Shen	Funimation dub	
2003	Dragon Ball Z: Super Android 13!	Android #13	Funimation dub	
2005	Madagascar	Police on Phone	Uncredited role	
2009	Summer Wars	Riichi Jinnouchi		
2012	Fafner: Heaven and Earth	Tamotsu Kodate		
2013	A Certain Magical Index: The Movie – The Miracle of Endymion	Aleister Crowley		
2014	Dragon Ball Z: Battle of Gods	Pilaf	Limited theatrical release	
2015	Dragon Ball Z: Resurrection 'F'	Pilaf	Limited theatrical release	
2016	The Boy and The Beast	Kyuta's father		
2016	Amerigeddon	Colonel Kashoid	Limited theatrical release	
2019	Dragon Ball Super: Broly	Pilaf	Limited theatrical release	
2019	The Crossroads of Hunter Wilde	Baal		

==== Video games ====
Year	Title	Role	Notes	Source
2002	Dragon Ball Z: Budokai	Android #17		
2003	Dragon Ball Z: Budokai 2	Android #17		
2004	Yu Yu Hakusho: Dark Tournament	Hiei		
2004	Dragon Ball Z: Budokai 3	Android #17, Kibito		
2004	BloodRayne 2	Minions		
2005	Dragon Ball Z: Sagas	Android #17		
2005	Fullmetal Alchemist 2: Curse of the Crimson Elixir	Arien Glostner (young), Customer		
2005	Dragon Ball Z: Budokai Tenkaichi	Android #17, Super #17		
2005	Æon Flux	Oren Goodchild, Soldiers		
2006	Super Dragon Ball Z	Android #17		
2006	Dragon Ball Z: Budokai Tenkaichi 2	Android #17, Super #17, Garlic Jr., Android #13, Pilaf Machine		
2007	Dragon Ball Z: Shin Budokai - Another Road	Kibito		
2007	Dragon Ball Z: Budokai Tenkaichi 3	Android #17, Super #17, Android #13, Garlic Jr., Pilaf Machine		
2008	Dragon Ball Z: Burst Limit	Android #17		
2008	Dragon Ball Origins	Pilaf		
2008	Dragon Ball Z: Infinite World	Android #17, Super #17		
2009	Dragon Ball: Revenge of King Piccolo	Pilaf		
2009	Dragon Ball: Raging Blast	Android #17		
2010	Dragon Ball Origins 2	Pilaf		
2010	Comic Jumper: The Adventures of Captain Smiley	Pling Pling		
2010	Dragon Ball: Raging Blast 2	Android #17, Android #13		
2010	Dragon Ball Z: Tenkaichi Tag Team	Android #17		
2011	Dragon Ball Z: Ultimate Tenkaichi	Android #17, Kibito		
2012	Borderlands 2	Marauder Ripper, Matchstick, Mick Zaford, Barlo Gutter, Ulysses, Sarcastic Clapper		
2012	Dragon Ball Z: For Kinect	Android #17		
2013	The Walking Dead: Survival Instinct	Jess Collins, Ash		
2014	Dragon Ball Z: Battle of Z	Android #17		
2014	Smite	Ra		
2014	Borderlands: The Pre-Sequel	Tassiter		
2015	Dragon Ball: Xenoverse	Android #17, Super #17		
2016	Dragon Ball Xenoverse 2	Android #17, Super #17, Android #13		
2016	Killing Floor 2	Dr. Hans Volter		
2018	Dragon Ball FighterZ	Android #17		
2018	Dragon Ball Legends	Android #17, Super #17, Android #13		
2020	Dragon Ball Z: Kakarot	Android #17, Pilaf, Kibito, Master Shen		
2020	Borderlands 3	Sharpshooter Marauder		

== Books ==
- Huber, Chuck; Huber, Kirsten (1996). Zak and the Three Tree. Firefly Works. 42pp. ISBN 978-0970266606.
- Huber, Chuck; von Braun, Jessica (2015). The Dreams of the Invisible Girl. Hound Comics. 40pp. ISBN 978-1939991614.
