= Dina Meyer =

American actress (born 1968)

- Meyer at Dragon Con in 2026
- Born: December 22, 1968 (age 57); Queens, New York City, U.S.
- Education: Long Island University (BBA); Neighborhood Playhouse School of the Theatre
- Occupation: Actress
- Years active: 1993–present
- Known for: Starship Troopers; Saw; Johnny Mnemonic; Dragonheart; Birds of Prey

Dina Meyer (born December 22, 1968) is an American actress. She began her career appearing in a recurring role on the Fox teen drama series Beverly Hills, 90210 (1993–94), before landing a leading role opposite Keanu Reeves in the 1995 film Johnny Mnemonic.

Meyer has acted in the films Dragonheart (1996), Starship Troopers (1997), Bats (1999), D-Tox (2002), and Star Trek: Nemesis (2002). She played Detective Allison Kerry in the Saw film franchise. On television, Meyer starred as Barbara Gordon/Oracle/Batgirl in the short-lived series Birds of Prey (2002–03) and was a regular on Secret Agent Man (2000) and Point Pleasant (2005). She appeared as Kellie in the dystopian movie Amerigeddon in 2016.

== Early life ==
Meyer was born to a Jewish family in Queens, New York in 1968. She graduated from Long Island University in Brookville, New York with a bachelor of business administration degree. She trained in acting for three years at the Neighborhood Playhouse School of the Theatre in New York.

== Career ==
Meyer moved to Los Angeles in 1993 to appear in the Fox teen drama series Beverly Hills, 90210 in the recurring role of Lucinda Nicholson. Shortly afterwards, she was cast as the female lead in the action film Johnny Mnemonic opposite Keanu Reeves. The following year, she appeared in the fantasy film Dragonheart directed by Rob Cohen. In early 1997, Meyer had a recurring role as Kate Miller in the NBC sitcom Friends. Later that year, she went to appear alongside Casper Van Dien in the science-fiction film Starship Troopers, directed by Paul Verhoeven. The film underperformed at the box office but has since attained cult status. The following year, she starred alongside James Caan in the neo-noir film Poodle Springs, which was released on HBO. In 1999, she starred in the horror film Bats; the film was a moderate box-office success. In 2002, she appeared opposite Sylvester Stallone in the thriller film D-Tox. Also in 2002, Meyer appeared as Romulan Commander Donatra in the science-fiction film Star Trek: Nemesis.

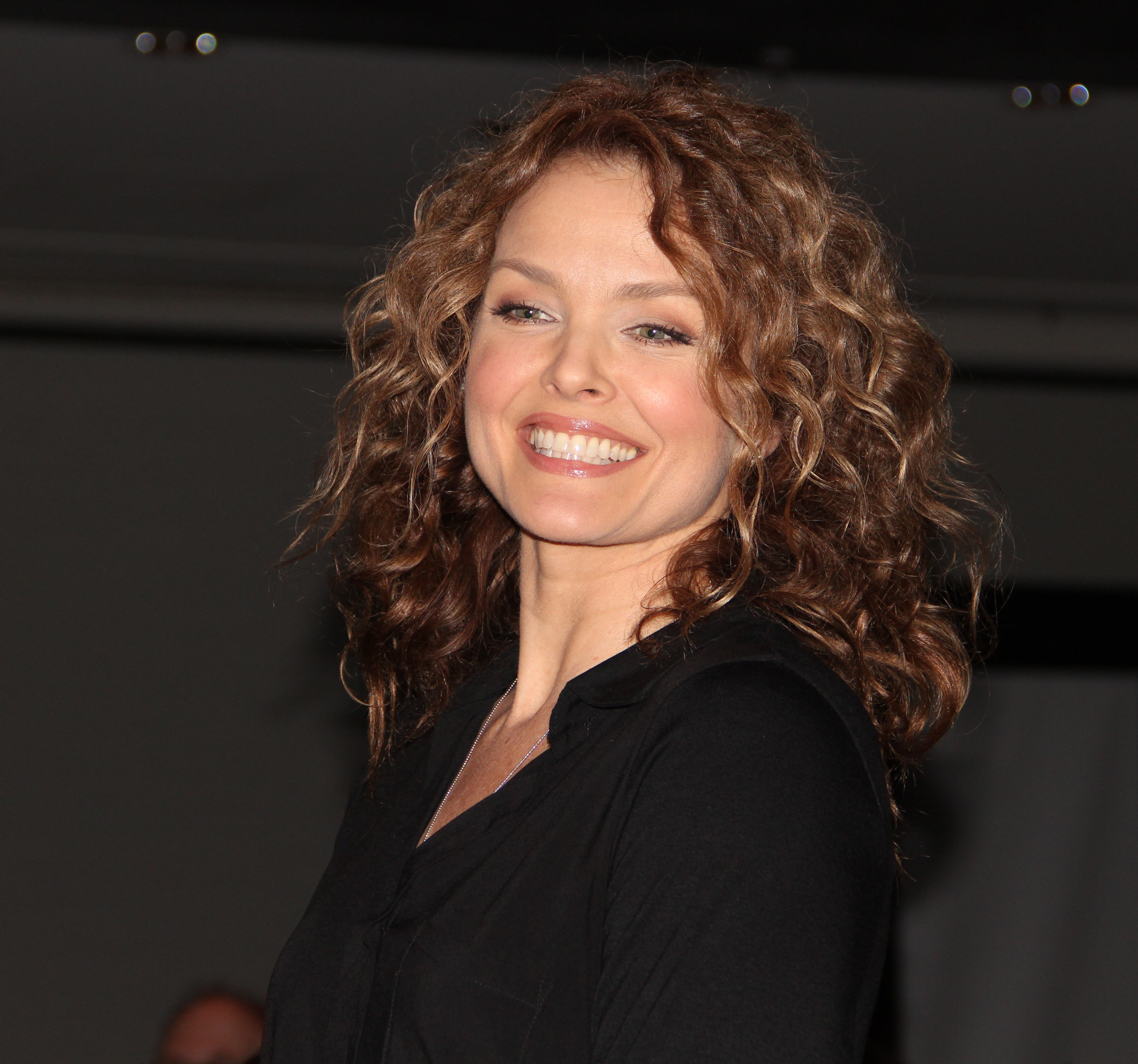
Meyer in 2013

In 2000, Meyer starred in the UPN spy drama series Secret Agent Man, which was cancelled after one season. From 2002 to 2003, she starred as Barbara Gordon/Oracle/Batgirl in The WB superhero series Birds of Prey. She reprised this role in 2019, on the CW series The Flash during "Crisis on Infinite Earths" crossover. In 2003, she had a recurring role in the Fox comedy-drama Miss Match, and in 2005 was a regular cast member in the Fox primetime soap opera, Point Pleasant. Meyer also played the leading roles in the Lifetime television movies Deception (2004), Crimes of Passion (2005), His and Her Christmas (2005), The Boy Next Door (2008), and Web of Desire (2009).

In 2004, Meyer played Detective Allison Kerry in the horror film Saw. She reprised her role in Saw II (2005), Saw III (2006), and Saw IV (2007). She later starred in a number of straight-to-video horror films, include Crazy Eights (2006) and Decoys 2: Alien Seduction (2007). She appeared in the 2010 horror-comedy film Piranha 3D and 2017 horror film The Evil Within. In 2013, Meyer appeared in the Western film Dead in Tombstone opposite Mickey Rourke. Meyer also played the leading roles in two more Lifetime Movie Network films, Lethal Seduction (2015), as a sexy, psychotic woman determined to get her man, and Flight 192 (2016), playing an FBI agent who is caught in a dilemma when she learns shortly after boarding a flight to Washington, DC, that her husband and son have been taken hostage.

Meyer has made several guest appearances on television series, including Ally McBeal, Six Feet Under, Nip/Tuck, The Mentalist, Castle, NCIS, CSI: Crime Scene Investigation, and American Horror Story. She had a recurring roles ABC comedy-drama Scoundrels in 2010, and on The CW teen drama 90210 from 2011 to 2012. In 2014, she starred opposite Patrick Warburton and Jesse Bradford in the Crackle series Sequestered. In 2018, she had a recurring roles on SyFy fantasy series The Magicians, as in the fourth season of Showtime's critically acclaimed drama, The Affair. In 2019, she began appearing in a recurring role in the CW sports drama All American as Gwen Adams, Asher's (played by Cody Christian) mother.

== Filmography ==
=== Film ===
Year	Title	Role	Notes
1995	Johnny Mnemonic	Jane	
1996	Dragonheart	Kara	
1997	Starship Troopers	Dizzy Flores	
1998	Nowhere Land	Monica	
1999	Bats	Sheila Casper	
2000	Stranger Than Fiction	Emma Scarlett	
2001	Time Lapse	Kate	Direct-to-video
2002	D-Tox	Mary	
2002	Unspeakable	Diana Purlow	
2002	Deadly Little Secrets	Stephanie Vincent	
2002	Star Trek: Nemesis	Romulan Commander Donatra	
2003	The Movie Hero	Elizabeth Orlando / The Love Interest	
2004	Deception	Erin Greer	
2004	Saw	Detective Allison Kerry	
2004	Breach	Lisa Vincson	
2005	Crimes of Passion	Rebecca Walker	
2005	Wild Things: Diamonds in the Rough	Kirsten Richards	Direct-to-video
2005	The Receipt	Venus	
2005	Saw II	Detective Allison Kerry	
2006	Saw III	Detective Allison Kerry	
2006	Crazy Eights	Jennifer Jones	
2007	Decoys 2: Alien Seduction	Alana Geisner	
2007	Saw IV	Detective Allison Kerry	
2008	Saw V	Detective Allison Kerry	Photo only
2009	VideoDome Rent-O-Rama	Ms. Motley	
2009	Fatal Secrets	Julia	
2010	Piranha 3D	Paula Montellano	
2013	Dead in Tombstone	Calathea "Cal" Massey	
2015	Golden Shoes	Kathleen Larou	Direct-to-video
2015	Clarity	Sharon	
2016	Fortune Cookie	Detective Emma Hoskins	Direct-to-video
2016	Amerigeddon	Kelly	
2016	The Unwilling	Michelle Harris	
2016	Flight 192	Sarah Plummer	
2017	The Evil Within	Lydia	
2017	Starship Troopers: Traitor of Mars	Dizzy Flores (voice)	
2019	Line of Duty	Ruth Carter	
2020	Unbelievable!!!!!	Female Moesha	
2022	Nightshade	Dr. Amy Collins	
2023	Detective Knight: Independence	Charlotte Burnham	
2023	Katie's Mom	Nancy	

=== Television ===
Year	Title	Role	Notes
1993	Strapped	Delivery Person	Television film
1993–1994	Beverly Hills, 90210	Lucinda Nicholson	Recurring role; 12 episodes
1997	Friends	Kate Miller	Guest role; three episodes
1997	Michael Hayes	Rebecca Klein	Episode: "Pilot"
1998	Poodle Springs	Laura Parker-Marlowe	Television film
1998	Ally McBeal	Anna Flint	Episode: "Forbidden Fruits"
2000	Secret Agent Man	Holliday	Main role; 12 episodes
2002	Federal Protection	Bootsie Cavander	Television film
2002	Six Feet Under	The Widow	Episode: "Someone Else's Eyes"
2002	The Outer Limits	Dr. Rachel Harris	Episode: "Free Spirit"
2002–2003	Birds of Prey	Barbara Gordon/Oracle/Batgirl	Main role; 14 episodes
2003–2004	Miss Match	Lauren Logan	Recurring role; 8 episodes
2004	Deception	Erin	Television film
2004	CSI: Crime Scene Investigation	Meg Cunningham	Episode: "Swap Meet"
2005	His and Her Christmas	Liz Madison	Television film
2005–2006	Point Pleasant	Amber Hargrove	Main role; 13 episodes
2006	Thief	Wanda Atwater	Episode: "Pilot"
2006	Imaginary Playmate	Suzanne Driscoll	Television film
2007	CSI: Miami	Elissa McClain	Episode: "Deep Freeze"
2008	Web of Desire	Beth Wyatt	Television film
2008	Riddles of the Sphinx	Jessica	Television film
2008	Monk	Sally Larkin	Episode: "Mr. Monk Gets Hypnotized"
2008	The Boy Next Door	Sara	Television film
2009	Nip/Tuck	Roxy St. James	Episode: "Roxy St. James"
2009	The Lost	Mira	Television film
2009	Burn Notice	Samantha	Episode: "Sins of Omission"
2010	NCIS	Holly Snow	Guest role; two episodes
2010	The Mentalist	Abigail Barge	Episode: "Red Herring"
2010	Castle	Lady Irena	Episode: "The Mistress Always Spanks Twice"
2010	Scoundrels	Nina Hong	Guest role; three episodes
2010	The Glades	Patricia Dixon	Episode: "Second Chance"
2011	CSI: Crime Scene Investigation	Anne-Marie Tolsom	Episode: "The List"
2011	Charlie's Angels	Jennifer Rice	Episode: "Angels in Paradise"
2011–2012	90210	Sheila	Guest role; three episodes
2012	Criminal Minds	Regina Lampert	Episode: "Unknown Subject"
2012	Undertow	Toby French	Television film
2013	The Wrong Woman	Kay Sullivan	Television film
2014	Sequestered	Helen Bennett	Main role; 12 episodes
2014	Christmas in Palm Springs	Jessica Brady	Main role; Television film
2015	Truth and Lies	Alison	Television film; also known as Text to Kill
2015	Lethal Seduction	Carissa Kensington	Television film
2015	A Dogwalker's Christmas Tale	Missy Paxton	Television film
2016	Fishes 'n Loaves: Heaven Sent	Mary Louise Michaels	Television film
2016	Turbulence	Sarah Plummer	Television film
2017	Girlfriend Killer	Detective Michelle Price	Television film
2017	Kingdom	Luanne	Episode: "Cactus"
2018	Evil Doctor	Dr. Natalie Barnes	Television film
2018	Code Black	Joan Reeves	Episode: "Better Angels"
2018	The Magicians	Stone Queen	Guest role; three episodes
2018	The Affair	Julie Christiansen	Guest role; three episodes
2018	American Horror Story: Apocalypse	Nora Campbell	Episode: "The End"
2018-2020	NCIS: Los Angeles	Veronica Stephens	Two episodes
2019	All Rise	Kiki Mackin	Episode: "Dripsy"
2019-2020	All American	Gwen Adams	Five episodes
2019	The Flash	Barbara Gordon/Oracle	Episode: "Crisis on Infinite Earths: Part Three"

=== Video games ===
Year	Title	Role	Notes
2014	Ancient Space	Dr. Willow Burke / Specialist Alma Linh (voice)	
2018	Blade Runner: Revelations	Eve / Ad Woman (voice)	
