= Venom (2005 film) =

American supernatural slasher film

- Theatrical release poster
- Directed by: Jim Gillespie
- Screenplay by: Flint Dille; John Zuur Platten; Brandon Boyce
- Story by: Flint Dille; John Zuur Platten
- Produced by: Scott Faye; Karen Lauder; Kevin Williamson
- Starring: Agnes Bruckner; Jonathan Jackson; Laura Ramsey; D. J. Cotrona; Rick Cramer; Meagan Good; Bijou Phillips; Method Man
- Cinematography: Steve Mason
- Edited by: Paul Martin Smith
- Music by: James L. Venable; John Debney (themes)
- Production companies: Dimension Films; Outerbanks Entertainment; Collision Entertainment
- Distributed by: Miramax Films
- Release date: September 16, 2005
- Running time: 85 minutes
- Country: United States
- Language: English
- Box office: $881,779

Venom is a 2005 American supernatural slasher film directed by Jim Gillespie. The film's ensemble cast includes Agnes Bruckner, Jonathan Jackson, Laura Ramsey, D. J. Cotrona, Rick Cramer, Meagan Good, and Method Man. The film follows a group of teens who fight to survive a man-turned-zombie after he becomes possessed by evil spirits.

Venom was released by Miramax Films on September 16, 2005. It received negative reviews from critics and was a box-office failure. It is the final film by Dimension Films to be released during their Miramax Films tenure before the Walt Disney Company, Miramax Films' parent company at the time, sold Dimension Films to The Weinstein Company on October 1, 2005.

The movie has no relation to the titular character from Marvel Comics.

== Plot ==
A Creole woman digs up a briefcase and drives off. Meanwhile, high school senior Eden and her friends, Rachel, CeCe, Ricky, Patty, Tammy, Eric, and Sean are hanging out at the local burger joint. Sean's father and local tow truck driver, Ray Sawyer, comes by to pick up an order, leading Rachel to comment on how scary he is while Tammy flashes him. After work, Eden and Eric walk home just as Ray drives up and asks if she's alright. When he is sure, he begins to leave when the Creole woman – CeCe's grandmother – passes by. She swerves to avoid Ray and nearly falls off the bridge. Ray saves her, but the woman begs him to get the suitcase. As he reaches for it, the car falls off of the bridge and starts sinking into the water below. Upon suddenly opening, several snakes emerge and attack Ray. The ambulance arrives to find Ray and CeCe's grandmother dead. CeCe arrives shaken up over the tragedy, and takes a charm that was on her grandmother's corpse. CeCe then surprises Eden and Eric by asking them about Ray.

Later that night, the coroner examines Ray's body, noting several snake bites. Suddenly, Ray gets back up and kills the coroner before leaving to retrieve his truck. After arriving home, he then proceeds to kill a cop. The next day, Eden visits her father's grave, and sees Ray's tow truck driving by. While swimming in the lake, a heavily drunk Sean ditches Rachel, forcing Eric to chase after him. Meanwhile, Tammy and Patty are planning to go shoplifting, but stop by Ray's business to fix their car first. Once Tammy's done, she goes to look for Patty, only to find her hanging by several chains. She tries to escape, but Ray lowers a car on her and sandblasts her to death.

As Eric follows Sean to Ray's garage, the latter gets angry at the former for abandoning him. He finds a picture of him when he was a little kid, which shows that Ray did care about him, but he storms out toward the garage and finds Tammy's remains. Later that night, Eden and her friends go to CeCe's grandmother's house, where CeCe explains that the snakes that killed Ray were full of evil that her grandmother took out of men to purify their souls. They try to escape, but their car has been flipped over. They see Ray and begin to run, but the undead killer pins Ricky with a crowbar and rips his arm off. Ray goes to enter the house, but finds he can't because it was blessed with voodoo spells. Despite this, he's able to throw a chain inside, drag Sean out, and mortally wound him. Eden and Eric shoot Ray with a rifle so the others can drag Sean inside and try to save him, but he dies on the floor. Rachel mourns the loss of her boyfriend while Eden talks CeCe into turning Sean's body into a human voodoo doll to control Ray. Meanwhile, Ray uses his tow truck on the house's foundation and pulls a whole room off; dragging Eric and Rachel with it and crushing CeCe's leg with a support beam.

Ray begins to climb the wreckage toward CeCe, but she stabs Sean's body several times to slow Ray down. Ultimately however, the possessed killer reaches her and kills her. Eden, Eric, and Rachel try to escape, but Ray follows in his truck and manages to drag Rachel halfway out of the car. Despite Eden's best efforts, Rachel's impaled on a fallen tree. Stuck in the swamp, Eden and Eric try to reach dry land while Ray dives beneath the murky water only to find a copy of Unicorn Island. Soon enough, Ray attacks them and causes them to separate; causing Eden to end up in a crypt with Ray's victims. When she goes to escape, Ray locks her in. Fearing his return, she hides underneath Patty's body just as Ray returns and throws Eric in. She initially believes he's dead, but when he opens his eyes, her surprised gasp alerts Ray. Eric sacrifices himself to protect Eden before she fights back using a charm CeCe gave her. Ray appears to submit, but the snakes possessing him attack her. However, she's able to evade them and use Ray's truck to finally kill him. As she staggers off, two snakes emerge from Ray's body in search of a new host.

== Cast ==
- Agnes Bruckner as Eden Sinclair
- Jonathan Jackson as Eric
- Laura Ramsey as Rachel
- Meagan Good as Cece
- D. J. Cotrona as Sean
- Pawel Szajda as Ricky
- Rick Cramer as Ray Sawyer
- Bijou Phillips as Tammy
- Davetta Sherwood as Patty
- Method Man as Deputy Turner
- Stacey Travis as Laura Sinclair

== Production ==
The film marked the re-teaming of screenwriter Kevin Williamson and director Jim Gillespie, after previously collaborating on I Know What You Did Last Summer (1997). The film is based on Backwater, an unproduced survival-horror video game designed by John Zuur Platten and Flint Dille. It was shot in Louisiana, in the cities of Amite, Choctaw, Hammond, and New Orleans.

== Release ==
=== Box office ===
Venom was a box-office flop. The film was released on September 16, 2005, several days after Hurricane Katrina devastated much of Southeast Louisiana, making the film seem unfortunately topical.

=== Critical reception ===
Venom garnered negative reviews from critics. On Rotten Tomatoes, the film holds an approval rating of 13% based on 64 reviews, with a weighted average rating of 3.1/10. The site's critical consensus reads, "A voodoo horror flick without the mojo, Venom is chock full of gory impalings of interchangeable teenage girls and hunky guys by an unstoppable zombie whose unimaginative rampage quickly lulls us to sleep." Metacritic, which uses a weighted average, assigned the film a score of 25 out of 100, based on 21 critics, indicating "generally unfavorable" reviews.

Kevin Thomas of the Los Angeles Times wrote that Gillespie "smartly directed" a script that follows in the "stylish, energetic and darkly amusing horror movie tradition." Anita Gates of The New York Times wrote that the film "certainly can't be called a good movie, but within its genre it's perfectly palatable." Sean Axmaker of the Seattle Post-Intelligencer praised the film, noting: "Venom delivers everything a teen horror audience could ask for in a brisk 85 minutes."

Peter Hartlaub of the San Francisco Chronicle wrote: "Venom is a bad horror film, made worse by the fact that it takes place entirely in Louisiana. Although there isn't a hurricane or even much rain in the film, it's hard to get past the truth -- right about now, people who live in the bayou would probably consider a crazy guy running around with a crowbar a welcome alternative to the reality of the past two weeks." Paul Schrodt of Slant Magazine felt the film paled in comparison to The Skeleton Key, calling it "another lifeless (but peculiarly racist) Deep South horror movie" with "mostly unimaginative" deaths and set pieces.

Johnny Butane of Dread Central gave note of the film's "paper thin" story and characters, "over the top" acting and quick dismissal of the killer, but felt it was "a pretty decent slasher movie," concluding that: "Hopefully it'll find its audience on DVD, as I'm sure is Dimension's plan anyway; but if you get a chance to see it in theaters, give it a go. Don't go in with high expectations, and you might enjoy yourself!" Scott Weinberg of DVD Talk wrote of the film, "Ultimately, Venom is too darn familiar to become anyone's dark-horse favorite, and the screenplay is more bland and familiar than it is outright terrible, but I'd say it's worthy of a rental if you love the horror stuff. You probably won't adore the thing, but you'll most likely admire its nasty tenacity."

In 2014, the film ranked at number 61 on a list of the 100 Greatest Slasher Movies on the genre website Vegan Voorhees.

=== Home media ===
Venom was released to DVD through Buena Vista Home Entertainment in the United States and Alliance Atlantis in Canada and marketed under the Dimension Home Video label on January 17, 2006. Outside of the United States and Canada, Venom was released to DVD through Buena Vista Home Entertainment and marketed under the Miramax Home Entertainment label in 2006.

== See also ==
- List of killer snake films
