= Crazy Eights (film) =

- Crazy Eights film poster
- Directed by: Jimi Jones
- Written by: Dan DeLuca; Jimi Jones; Ji-un Kwon (contributing writer)
- Produced by: Dan DeLuca; Brian J. Gilbert; Vicky Clark Jennings; Jimi Jones; John Kaila; Kurt Uebersax; Rick Whealen
- Starring: Dina Meyer; George Newbern; Traci Lords; Frank Whaley; Gabrielle Anwar; Dan DeLuca
- Music by: Olivier Glissant; C. Eric; Nick Nolan
- Distributed by: After Dark Films; Lionsgate
- Release date: October 31, 2006
- Running time: 80 minutes
- Country: United States
- Language: English

Crazy Eights is a 2006 American horror film that follows the story of six companions as they fill the last request of a dead friend. The film is distributed by the After Dark Horrorfest which annually releases an eight-part movie collection that typically is likened towards the movie genres of horror and thriller, Crazy Eights being part of the 2007 series released by the movie collection. The film stars Traci Lords, Dina Meyer, George Newbern, Gabrielle Anwar, Dan DeLuca and Frank Whaley.

== Plot ==
A group of six estranged adults, including Professor Jones (Dina Meyer) and Father Lyle Dey (George Newbern), gather for the funeral of a childhood friend. The group is revealed to have all been patients at a government mental facility during their childhood and their friend has asked in her will that they return to the facility to open a time capsule they left there. The group of six agree and arrive at the long-abandoned facility, each recounting their experiences and slowly regressing their behaviors to when they were patients. They excavate the container and are shocked to find a young girl's skeleton inside. They realize that this was the 'eighth' friend, the one they collectively forgot about upon being discharged. Unnerved, the friends regress further, scattering throughout the facility where they find evidence that sadistic medical experiments were once performed on the children. The vengeful spirit of their forgotten friend begins to stalk the group, playing on their fears and mental distress in order to kill them off one by one. The group is whittled down until the final member, Professor Jones, remembers that the group willingly sacrificed their friend in one of the facility's experiments so that they could be discharged, choosing to trade her life for theirs.

== Cast ==
- Dina Meyer as Jennifer Jones
- George Newbern as Father Lyle Dey
- Traci Lords as Gina Conte
- Dan DeLuca as Wayne Morrison
- Frank Whaley as Brent Sykes
- Gabrielle Anwar as Beth Patterson
- Karen Beriss as Karen
- Michael Gabel as Dr. Pike

== Production ==
James K. Jones directed this film and Dan DeLuca was the main producer and writer.

The film was released in select theaters on November 9, 2007. The film runs for a total of 80 minutes. The film was distributed by After Dark Films. The film was produced in the United States.

== Reception ==
=== Awards ===
Part of the After Dark Horrorfest film series "8 Films to Die For".

=== Critical response ===
The film has received negative reviews from critics. On Rotten Tomatoes the film has 3 reviews from critics, all negative.

A reviewer for the website Dread Central expressed disappointment with the film's plot, recommending that viewers "forget everything about the plot and enjoy the visuals". Brent McKnight, a reviewer for online magazine PopMatters, expressed a slightly more negative view when reviewing the film upon its release to home video, summarizing "With no real plot, and no real characters, Crazy Eights is a weak, toothless attempt at a horror film".
