= Amerigeddon =

- Theatrical release poster
- Directed by: Mike Norris
- Screenplay by: Gary Heavin
- Produced by: Sanford Hampton; Diane Heavin; Gary Heavin; Valerie Norris; David Timmes
- Starring: Aliya Astaphan; Rich Bentz; Giovannie Cruz
- Music by: Denis Kashoid
- Production company: Forewarned
- Distributed by: Sony Pictures Home Entertainment (2016 US DVD); Sunfilm Entertainment (2018 German DVD); Tiberius Film (2018) (German DVD and Blu-ray)
- Release date: May 13, 2016 (United States)
- Running time: 92 minutes

Amerigeddon is a 2016 American action film directed by Mike Norris. It is written by Gary Heavin and Chase Hunter. The film describes a fictional attack on American society by the federal government, working in concert with a global "Elitist" organization and the United Nations. Heavin has said that he regards the events in the film as a "very real threat".

The film was shot on Heavin's Central Texas ranch and in nearby towns. Most of the cast members were recruited locally.

The film was released on May 13, 2016.

== Plot ==
In the near future, the United Nations and a shadowy European billionaire globalist permanently disable the United States of America's power grid with an electromagnetic pulse attack. The current president, a puppet of the United Nations, declares permanent martial law, and the UN Task Force, consisting of mostly soldiers of Chinese and Russian nationality, occupy the country. A detachment of US soldiers is ordered to help the UN forces stage false-flag attacks and make the American public more open to the UN occupation. Lieutenant Brandon Lane refuses and defects from the US forces to regroup with his patriotic family. The family and their allies fight to save their little part of the United States and send a message to the UN that America will not be controlled by globalists and aliens. The patriots successfully resist the initial UN assault after an intense battle, but the war is only just beginning.

== Cast ==
- Spencer Neville as Brandon Lane
- Gary Heavin as Charlie
- Marshall R. Teague as Colonel Crane
- Dina Meyer as Kelly
- Carey Scott as Roger Smith
- India Eisley as Penny
- AnnaLynne McCord as Sam
- Greta Norris as Frankie
- Mike Norris as Harlan
- Diane Ladd as Betty
- Jonny Cruz as Timmes
- Chuck Huber as Colonel Kashoid
- Giovannie Cruz as Sandra
- Alex Jones as Senator Reed
