= A Town Called Purgatory =

2024 American film by Matt Servitto

- Directed by: Matt Servitto
- Story by: Ken Arnold; Dan DeLuca
- Produced by: Frederik Füssel; Ken Arnold; Dan DeLuca; Matt Servitto
- Starring: Ken Arnold; Dan DeLuca; Kevin Jiggetts; Matt Servitto
- Cinematography: Frederik Füssel
- Production companies: Non Nomen Films; Seven Ocean Pictures
- Release date: 2024
- Running time: 87 minutes
- Country: United States
- Language: English

A Town Called Purgatory is a 2024 American horror Western film directed by Matt Servitto and written by Ken Arnold and Dan DeLuca. Arnold and DeLuca star in the film as a Yankee lawman and an ex-Confederate in the aftermath of the American Civil War; when they join forces to catch a gang of train robbers, they are led to a ghost town called Purgatory, where they find themselves hunted by a skin-walker of Navajo legend.

A Town Called Purgatory screened at Creature Feature Weekend in Gettysburg, Pennsylvania, in April 2024.

== Cast ==
- Matt Servitto as Frank Sparks
- Jeff Ricketts as Reverend Silas Fist
- Ken Arnold as Beau Riffen
- Dan DeLuca as Cody Parnum
- Kevin Jiggetts as Nicodemus Black
- Zach Steffey as Ezera Beckett
- Sam Kozeluh as John Sparks
- Claudius von Stolzmann as Henry Sparks
- Maria Lohn as Anna Place

== Production ==
=== Development ===
Arnold stated that the concept of A Town Called Purgatory was derived from spaghetti Westerns and horror folklore, and that the filmmakers "aim[ed] to work in a unique genre fusion that hasn't been widely explored. The development from story to screenplay involved extensive brainstorming sessions over video calls, sharing articles and videos that we had read and watched until our visions aligned." Arnold had previously starred in a Western film, The Marshal, released in 2019.

=== Filming ===
Filming took place in Austria during the COVID-19 pandemic. DeLuca stated, "To us, this was a challenge, not an obstacle. Those constraints would require one location, a small cast and the ability to isolate from the public. The story inevitably mirrors that sense of unease and isolation that we felt during lockdown, and this fed into the narrative, pushing us to explore themes of confinement, the wariness of others and the unknown."

== Release ==
In April 2024, A Town Called Purgatory was shown at Creature Feature Weekend in Gettysburg, Pennsylvania. It is scheduled to screen at Monsterpalooza in Los Angeles, California, on June 2, 2024.
