= The Jester (2023 film) =

Film by Colin Krawchuk

- Directed by: Colin Krawchuk
- Screenplay by: Colin Krawchuk
- Story by: Michael Sheffield; Colin Krawchuk
- Produced by: Patrick Ewald; Brian Clarke; Katie Page; Chad Horn; Carlo Glorioso; Ted Hentschke; Cory Okouchi
- Starring: Michael Sheffield; Lelia Symington; Delaney White; Matt Servitto
- Cinematography: Joe Davidson
- Edited by: Colin Krawchuk
- Music by: Rafal Gosciminski
- Production company: Epic Pictures Group
- Release date: September 29, 2023
- Running time: 90 minutes
- Country: United States
- Box office: $995,780

The Jester is a 2023 American independent slasher film written, directed and edited by Colin Krawchuk in his directorial debut. It stars Michael Sheffield, Lelia Symington, Delaney White, and Matt Servitto. The plot follows a deadly magician who terrorizes the inhabitants of a small town on Halloween night.

== Cast ==
- Michael Sheffield as the Jester
- Lelia Symington as Emma
- Delaney White as Jocelyn
- Matt Servitto as John

== Production ==
The Jester is based on a trilogy of short films by Krawchuk first released on YouTube in 2016. Eduardo Sánchez, co-creator of The Blair Witch Project, served as an executive producer on the film.

The film tells the story of two half-sisters who meet at their father's funeral, and are tormented by the Jester. According to Krawchuk, although the team had originally considered a story that would explore the Jester's background, they later decided that focusing on the other characters would be more interesting.

== Release ==
The film is distributed by DREAD. It had a limited theatrical run starting on September 29, 2023, followed by a video on demand release on October 3, 2023.

== Reception ==
On the review aggregator website Rotten Tomatoes, 25% of 8 critics' reviews are positive.

Martin Unsworth of Starburst magazine gave the film 3/5 stars, writing that its "mix of drama and horror doesn't quite gel" although "there will certainly be times when you'll question whether you're being shown reality or if it's a projection of what's inside the characters". Comparing the Jester to Art the Clown, Unsworth described the villain as "a great, simple concoction that is creepy enough to enter the imagination of fans".

Phil Hoad of The Guardian gave the film 2/5 stars. While praising the Jester, he said, "It's just a shame the non-homicidal portions have none of the same sprezzatura. Writer-director Colin Krawchuk saddles us with a poorly written, lead-footed plot delivered in stodgy lumps between killings."

== Sequel ==
A sequel titled The Jester 2 was released in September 2025, with Sheffield reprising his role as the Jester.
