= Stephen Kaplan =

Stephen Kaplan may refer to:

- Stephen Kaplan (paranormal investigator) (1940–1995), paranormal investigator
- Stephen Kaplan (psychologist), environmental psychologist
- Stephen Kaplan (fencer) (born 1949), American Olympic fencer

== See also ==
- Steven Kaplan (disambiguation)
