= Billionaire Ransom =

- Directed by: Jim Gillespie
- Written by: Alexander Agnon
- Produced by: Sarah Black; Ed Elbert
- Starring: Jeremy Sumpter; Phoebe Tonkin; Sebastian Koch; Ashley Walters; Dominic Sherwood; Ed Westwick
- Cinematography: Denis Crossan
- Edited by: Alex Mackie
- Music by: Hybrid
- Production company: Pinewood Studios
- Distributed by: Orion Pictures
- Release dates: 5 May 2016 (Kuwait); 19 August 2016 (United States); 22 August 2016 (United Kingdom, DVD)
- Running time: 107 minutes
- Country: United Kingdom
- Language: English

Billionaire Ransom, also known as Take Down, is a British thriller film that was directed by Jim Gillespie and written by Alexander Ignon. The film stars are Jeremy Sumpter, Phoebe Tonkin, Ed Westwick, Dominic Sherwood, Mark Bonnar, and Sebastian Koch. It was released in Kuwait on 5 May 2016 and later in the United States on 19 August 2016.

== Plot ==
Kyle (Jeremy Sumpter) is the spoiled and entitled son of a wealthy father. He attends a party and meets Amy (Phoebe Tonkin), and they immediately hit it off. They leave the party together, and Kyle, still drunk, wrecks his car by losing control and flipping it over; he flees the scene and leaves Amy for dead. While his father does use his connections to get Kyle out of jail, he decides that the only way Kyle can learn responsibility is by being sent to a tough-love camp on a remote island in the UK for rich kids who messed up one too many times.

Kyle is resistant at first and is horrified to discover that Amy is also there; quite naturally, she despises him. But just when Kyle is starting to warm up to his new life, and has started to patch things up with Amy, three mercenaries invade the camp, kill the counselors and security guards and take the wealthy teens hostage. They demand one billion dollars from their parents, but Kyle who notices them manages to escape. He spends the night in an abandoned overturned car and in the morning decides to check things out.

But as he moves on towards the facility, he encounters a stranger who reveals himself to be one of the mercenaries and points a loaded rifle at him. He forces Kyle to walk across a rope bridge and as they walk across Kyle intentionally shakes up the bridge, causing a struggle between the two of them. During the struggle, Kyle manages to knock the rifle out of his hands, and causes both of them to fall into the river below. Kyle survives but the mercenary dies from falling into the shallow end of the river breaking his neck in the process.

Kyle manages to return to the facility at night and sneaks past the mercenaries and frees the other teens after they were tied up, they take all the supplies they can carry and arm themselves with some bows and arrows and take to the woods. After getting a fair distance away from the facility Kyle and one of the teens decide to split into two groups to make it harder for them to be tracked down. They take into the woods, and at around the same time the mercenaries discover that the teens have escaped and decide to track them down.

As one of the group of teens is hiking through the woods, one teen whose name is Keiko cuts her thigh after trying to climb over a log. She decides not to tell anyone and keeps it to herself, they all decide to take shelter deep in the woods to rest for the night. In the morning, one of the mercenaries, Rachel, pursues them in the woods and trips one of their booby traps which sends wood spikes into her leg. Kyle and his group hear her scream but decide to leave her to die, as they are moving along they encounter Amy who has a troubled look on her face. When Kyle asks what's wrong she tells them that Keiko had injured herself and kept her wound hidden, as a result she bled out overnight by the time they found out it was too late. Keiko's boyfriend refusing to believe this rushes to the other group with Kyle and the others following behind.

Kyle and the others arrive and see Keiko's boyfriend mourning and sitting over her body, the others are left stunned, and seeing this Kyle runs off intent on revenge. Kyle heads over to where the mercenary Rachel had been caught in their trap to kill her in retaliation, but she is nowhere to be found. Until she appears behind Kyle pointing her rifle at him and forces him to drop the bow and arrows he has on him, and restrains him with some rubber cuffs. As she prepares to take him away Amy arrives and sees what's going on and jumps on Rachel and they roll down a hill. As a result of the tumble, Amy ends up breaking her arm with her bone protruding out as a result. A fight ensues between the two and ends with Amy puncturing Rachel's neck with her broken bone killing her.

Kyle tends to Amy's arm and the two reconcile by sharing a kiss with each other. After Kyle and Amy leave to regroup with the others, another mercenary named Danny finds Rachel's corpse and enraged decides to hunt down the teens. He manages to catch up to them and points his rifle at them but he ends up being surrounded by the teens. He is unfazed and tells them to drop their weapons. They comply, but Kyle and the other teens distract him long enough for James to shoot him in the neck with an arrow incapacitating him.

Meanwhile, the parents of the teens discuss what to do, as they are trapped and will have to follow the kidnappers' demands. But then they receive a video call from a government agent who was contacted by some of the parents behind Mr. Hartmann's back. The agent promises to rescue their kids but Mr. Hartmann refuses saying he will not wait for the bad news and decides to head to the island via his helicopter. A representative of one of the other parents Jonathan Tilton-Scofield decides to join him in his endeavor.

Kyle and the others flee taking Danny's rifle with them, the leader of the mercenaries Speckc finds Danny barely alive and upon his request kills him with a shot to the head. Kyle and the others find shelter in an abandoned building and discuss their next move. One of the teens offers the option of killing the last mercenary with the rifle they took from them, but Amy disagrees saying it's not a good idea. When the teen asks why Kyle responds by saying that it's not who they are, everything they've done so far has been in self-defense this time it's different they have a choice. They decide to use the rifle to incapacitate Speckc rather than kill him and have one of the teens act as a sniper hiding in the forest, while they trap him.

However Speckc sees through this and takes the teen with the rifle hostage and takes him to the river forcing all the other teens out of their hiding places. As they are talking one of the teens shoots Speckc in his leg with an arrow, allowing them to escape however Speckc fires back at them with his rifle barely missing the teens. Kyle tackles him and after a brief struggle, Kyle strikes him several times on his head with a rock and throws him over a small waterfall causing Speckc to land on a protruding spike killing him.

Afterward, the authorities arrive and treat the children for their injuries. It is then that Kyle's father Bobby Hartmann arrives much to his surprise, they hug relieved to see each other. Jonathan Tilton-Scofield arrives as well, he is revealed to be working for Amy's father who is surprised to see him but he states he was worried about her that's why he came. Amy thanks him and then walks away and sits down and takes a look at Speckc's satellite cellphone noticing he had placed several calls to an unknown number.

Mr. Hartmann, Kyle, and Jonathan discuss the whole ordeal, with Mr. Hartmann stating that he finds it hard to believe that one man came up with this whole scheme, but Jonathan comments that since all of the mercenaries are dead there is no one left to question raising eyebrows from Kyle and Mr. Hartmann. Just then a phone rings it is revealed to be Jonathan's second cellphone, Amy asks "why don't you answer it" she then asks "you want to tell me why the last seven calls from Speckc's cellphone came from the one you're holding?

Jonathan realizes he's been made, but quickly denies the accusations right before Mr. Hartmann punches him in the face. He berates him saying "a lot of good innocent people died because of him." Amy says that her father taught her to be strong and to look out for herself and that he taught her well. Jonathan continues pleading his innocence as he is dragged away by the authorities, Kyle comforts Amy as Mr. Hartmann looks on proud of his son.

== Cast ==
- Jeremy Sumpter as Kyle Hartmann
- Phoebe Tonkin as Amy Tilton
- Sebastian Koch as Bobby Hartmann
- Ashley Walters as Danny Dorsey
- Dominic Sherwood as James Herrick
- Ed Westwick as Billy Speck
- Julia Ragnarsson as Rachel Hennie
- Mark Bonnar as Lawrence Close
- Anna-Louise Plowman as Emily Tilton Scofield
- Thalissa Teixeira as Paloma Nava
- Elliot Knight as Marsac
- Umar Malik as Fayed

== Production ==
In March 2013, it was announced that Jim Gillespie would direct a teen thriller titled Take Down. In February 2014, Jeremy Sumpter, Phoebe Tonkin, and Sebastian Koch were cast in the film. On 14 May 2014 it was reported that Ed Westwick and Dominic Sherwood had joined the cast of the film.

Principal photography began on 2 June 2014 at South Stack Lighthouse on the island of Anglesey in Wales, and the Isle of Man.

== Soundtrack ==
Take Down (Original Movie Soundtrack)

Soundtrack album by Hybrid
- Released: 19 August 2016
- Recorded: 2015–16
- Genre: Soundtrack
- Producers: Mike Truman, Chris Healings, Charlotte James

Hybrid soundtrack chronology
Vice (2015)	Take Down (Original Movie Soundtrack) (2016)	Interlude in Prague (2017)

The official soundtrack for the film was composed and produced by Hybrid. The soundtrack was released on 19 August 2016 by CAS Admin Ltd.

No.	Title	Length
1.	"We Can Be Free"	3:46
2.	"Journey to the Island"	2:32
3.	"Carousel"	2:09
4.	"Keiko"	1:42
5.	"Unemployed"	2:29
6.	"Maxwell's House"	3:25
7.	"Step Master"	1:09
8.	"Heading Out"	0:46
9.	"A Thousand Million"	2:06
10.	"Space to Think"	2:03
11.	"Climbing Wall"	2:12
12.	"Still Waiting"	1:21
13.	"Island Attack"	4:17
14.	"Croft"	1:41
15.	"Will He Let You Down"	0:59
16.	"Last Chance"	2:07
17.	"Into the Desert"	2:42
18.	"War Paint"	1:35
19.	"Drop the Bow"	2:14
20.	"Danny's Last Stand"	2:00
21.	"We're Not Killers"	2:29
22.	"To the Death (Part 1)"	3:17
23.	"To the Death (Part 2)"	3:43
24.	"It's Over"	3:39
25.	"Down to the Wire"	4:05
26.	"Bad Habit"	4:33
