= Dead in Tombstone =

2013 film

- DVD cover
- Directed by: Roel Reiné
- Written by: Shane Kuhn; Brendan Cowles
- Produced by: Mike Elliott
- Starring: Danny Trejo; Anthony Michael Hall; Mickey Rourke; Dina Meyer
- Cinematography: Roel Reiné
- Edited by: Radu Ion
- Music by: Hybrid
- Production company: Universal 1440 Entertainment
- Distributed by: Universal Pictures
- Release date: October 22, 2013
- Running time: 100 minutes
- Country: United States
- Language: English

Dead in Tombstone is a 2013 American direct-to-video horror Western film produced by Universal 1440 Entertainment. It was directed by Roel Reiné and written by Shane Kuhn and Brendan Cowles. The film stars Danny Trejo as Guerrero, a gang leader who gets double-crossed by his fellow gang members. Striking a pact with the Devil after entering Hell, he resurfaces to the earthly world to avenge his own death by killing the men who murdered him. The film was released in home media on October 22, 2013, and was followed by a sequel, Dead Again in Tombstone (2017).

The film is based on the concept of the deal with the Devil.

== Plot ==
In the frontier of the Wild West, Red Cavanaugh is to be hanged for his crimes. Calmly, he says that every man at the gallows will be dead before sunrise. Moments later, the Blackwater gang – Baptiste, Darko, Ramos, Snake, and Washington – arrive led by Red's half-brother Guerrero de la Cruz. After slaughtering everyone and freeing Red, they retreat. The next morning, Red tells them about Edendale, Colorado, where gold ore is being stored in a bank until a mineral dispute can be settled. Guerrero agrees to steal it, so long as they avoid unnecessary deaths. After the seven rob the bank, Red betrays Guerrero, as he had acquired the deed to the mine and wants to take over the town. He shoots Guerrero, and despite Guerrero's orders, Red convinces the rest of the gang to turn on him; they all shoot Guerrero to death.

Finding himself in Hell, Guerrero meets Lucifer, whom he had seen recently in his dreams. Guerrero bargains with him, to allow him to return to Earth and to kill his former gang, so that the fires of Hell can grow hotter than he alone can stoke with his flesh. Intrigued by this, Lucifer grants Guerrero 24 hours to slay all six of his betrayers or his soul will remain damned to Hell; Satan tells him that only Guerrero can kill the six, dissuading him from asking for help. Guerrero wakens one year to the day of his death and makes his way back to town now called "Tombstone" in his memory.

Ramos, shaken by an omen earlier, returns to his home and witnesses two of his farmhands killed before confronting Guerrero, whom he could not immediately recognize. After Guerrero puts together his guns, a feat only Red and he could accomplish, Ramos recognizes him, and he is shot to death. Taking his clothes, Guerrero has the local pastor set up six pine boxes as coffins and stations Ramos in one of them. The following morning, Baptiste and Darko discover Ramos and invade a nearby slaughterhouse. After a stand-off with Baptiste and his men, Guerrero kills Baptiste, but realizes that he still bleeds like a mortal. Darko tells Red about the stranger killing them off, and he sends Washington to the mine to insure that the man protecting them from the law is paid off in full. The gang goes to the saloon, where Guerrero is, and a firefight ensues. After defeating them, Guerrero sees the former sheriff's widow, Calathea, about to kill Red, and stops her, but he is trampled by Red's horse as he flees town. Waking sometime later, he explains to Father Paul and her about his situation. Showing him Darko's dead body, whom he had killed during the saloon brawl, Calathea agrees to help him, and the two make their way to the mine.

In the mine, Judah Clark, a marshal, is revealed to be aiding Red and protecting him for access to the gold. They leave Washington and Snake to finish off Guerrero, but he turns the tables and kills Washington, as Calathea and he escape back to town with his body. After an intense chase, they return to town. In a stand-off, Guerrero kills Snake with a gunshot to the eye, but he is quickly shot down and Calathea is captured. Lucifer, still intrigued by Guerrero's tenacity, returns him to life with one hour remaining on his deadline. After a mob tries to kill Red, he takes Calathea captive and confronts his brother, who convinces him to a fair duel. Lucifer cheats with seconds remaining on the clock, and Red and Guerrero instead battle by hand. Guerrero gains the upper hand and kills Red, but two minutes after his time is up.

Entering the church, Lucifer informs Guerrero of his failure, but does not want to condemn him to Hell. Instead, he forces Guerrero to kill outlaws to pay off his debt. Now, with Edendale out of danger, Guerrero rides off into the countryside, looking for his next bounty to collect for Hell.

== Cast ==
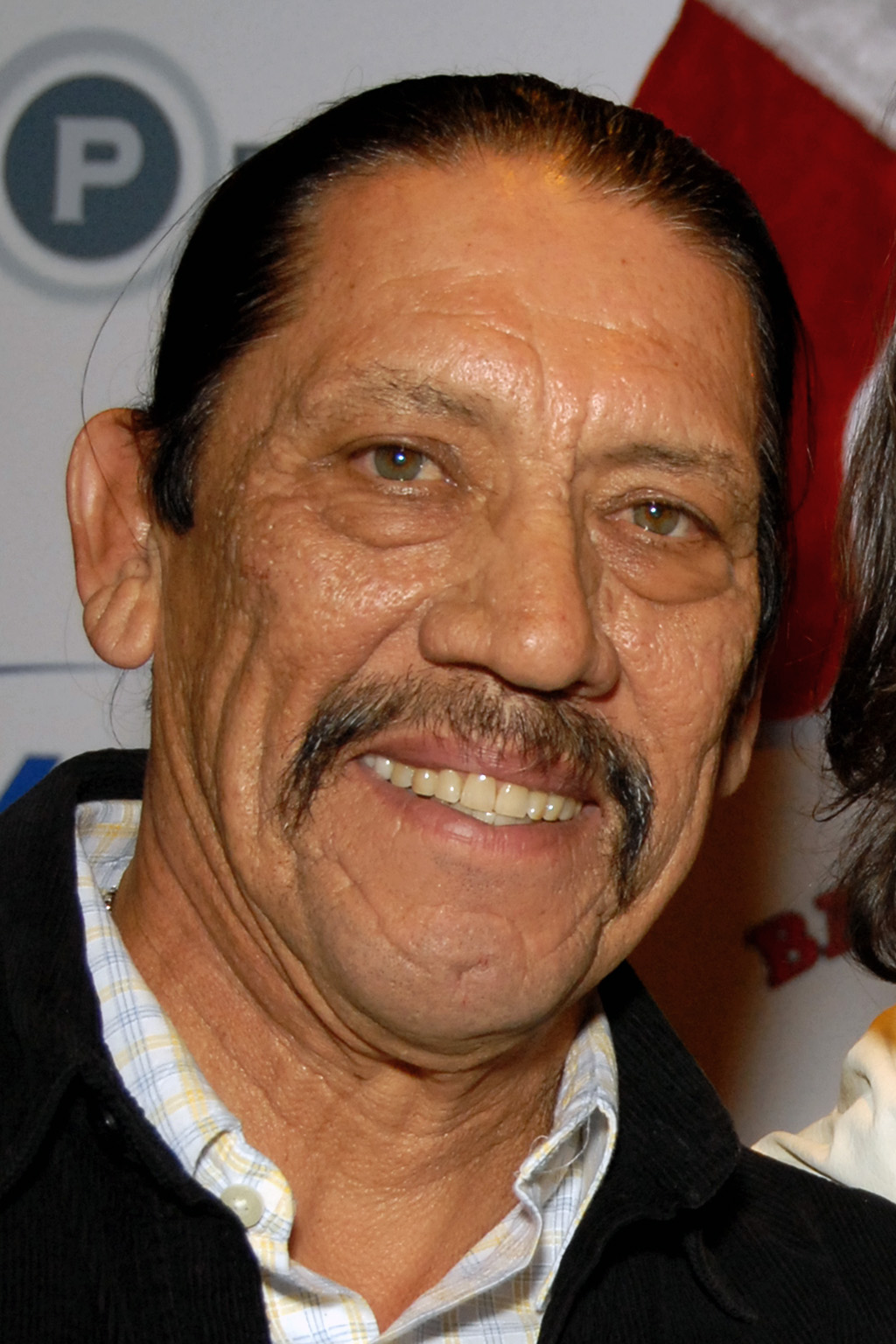
Star Danny Trejo in 2009

- Danny Trejo, as Guerrero de la Cruz, is the betrayed and fallen leader of the Blackwater gang. He has been resurrected by Lucifer as an undead vigilante to find and kill the members of Blackwater, so Lucifer can collect their souls.
- Anthony Michael Hall, as Red "Rojo" Cavanaugh, is de la Cruz's half-brother.
- Mickey Rourke, as Lucifer, is a proud, fallen archangel of rebellion and one of the seven princes of Hell, known among mortals as the Devil or Satan. Lucifer offers Guerrero a chance at redemption by sending him back to Earth and giving him a mission to hunt down his old gang, so Lucifer can collect their souls.
- Ronan Summers as Ramos, gang member
- Emil Hoștină as Baptiste, gang member
- Ovidiu Niculescu as Darko, gang member
- Radu Andrei Micu as Washington, gang member, arsonist
- Edward Akrout as "Snake", gang member
- Colin Mace as Marshall Judah Clark
- James Carroll Jordan as Father Paul, Edendale's pastor
- Dina Meyer as Calathea "Cal" Massey, wife of Edendale's sheriff
- Daniel Lapaine as Sheriff Bob Massey

== Production ==
Danny Trejo signed on as Guerrero, leader of the Blackwater Gang. Anthony Michael Hall played Guerrero's traitorous half-brother, Red. Mickey Rourke was cast as the Devil. The film was directed by Roel Reine and written by Shane Kuhn and Brendan Cowles. Filming commenced in around April 2012. Filming locations included Bucharest.

== Soundtrack ==
Dead in Tombstone (Original Motion Picture Soundtrack)

Soundtrack album by Hybrid
- Released: October 15, 2013
- Producer: Mike Truman, Chris Healings, Charlotte James

Hybrid soundtrack chronology
| Ghost Recon: Future Soldier (2012) | Dead in Tombstone (Original Motion Picture Soundtrack) (2013) | Driveclub (2014) |

For the film's music, director Reine wanted "a contemporary score for a traditional film with a unique twist". The music was composed by British electronic music group Hybrid, comprising Michael Truman, Chris Healings, and Charlotte James. The soundtrack was released on October 15, 2013, by Back Lot Records.

Soundtrack
| No. | Title | Length |
|---|---|---|
| 1. | "Meet The Blacksmith" | 1:18 |
| 2. | "Beat The Devil's Tattoo" | 3:31 |
| 3. | "The River To Edendale" | 2:05 |
| 4. | "Gunfighters Are In Town" | 1:49 |
| 5. | "No Need To Be A Hero" | 2:45 |
| 6. | "I Shot The Sheriff" | 3:01 |
| 7. | "Deal With The Devil" | 2:44 |
| 8. | "Guerrero Is Back" | 2:48 |
| 9. | "Clock Starts Ticking" | 2:14 |
| 10. | "The Meat Market" | 4:40 |
| 11. | "They Killed My Husband" | 2:09 |
| 12. | "Blackwater Siege" | 2:07 |
| 13. | "It's Been A While" | 4:00 |
| 14. | "Stay Sharp Guerrero" | 3:15 |
| 15. | "Odds Favour House" | 2:00 |
| 16. | "He's My Brother" | 6:09 |
| 17. | "Washington" | 2:14 |
| 18. | "The Chase" | 2:32 |
| 19. | "This Is The West" | 4:14 |
| 20. | "Six Feet Under" | 2:54 |
| Total length: | | 58:38 |

== Release ==
Early reports stated that the film would be released in December 2012, but this proved to be untrue. Dead in Tombstone was first released on digital download platforms on October 8, 2013. It was released on Blu-ray and DVD on October 22, 2013.

== Reception ==
Scott Weinberg of Fearnet called it "visually amusing, but narratively arid". Tyler Foster of DVD Talk rated it 2/5 stars and wrote that the film wastes a great idea with inept directing. Patrick Naugle of DVD Verdict wrote that the execution does not live up to the "fascinating concept". David Maine of Pop Matters rated it 6/10 stars and called it enjoyable for what it is.

== Sequel ==
In 2017, Danny Trejo reprised his role for Dead Again in Tombstone, also directed by Roel Reiné. The teleplay was written by Ethan Wiley.
