= Matt Servitto =

American actor (born 1965)

- Born: Matthew Joseph Servitto; April 7, 1965 (age 61); Teaneck, New Jersey, U.S.
- Education: Juilliard School (BFA)
- Occupation: Actor
- Years active: 1989–present
- Spouse: Anne Lauterbach (m. 2001)
- Children: 3

Matthew Joseph Servitto (born April 7, 1965) is an American actor known for his roles as Special Agent Dwight Harris on the HBO crime series The Sopranos, Trask Bodine on All My Children (1989–1990), Deputy Brock Lotus on the Cinemax action series Banshee and Representative Donatelle on the Showtime series Brotherhood (2006–2008), and his film roles as Chipmunk in Two Family House (2000), and as Eddie in Hitch (2005).

== Early life ==
Servitto was born in Teaneck, New Jersey and spent his childhood in Detroit, Michigan. He is a graduate of The Juilliard School in New York City.

== Career ==
Servitto appeared as Representative Donald Donatello on the series Brotherhood and had a guest appearance as Carrie Bradshaw's editor Gabe on Sex and the City. He played Lucky Luciano in the 1992 film Mad Dog Coll. He also voiced the character Sam in the 2002 video game Mafia: The City of Lost Heaven.

He appeared in the 2005 film Hitch as Eddie. In the episode "Identity" of the series Body of Proof, he played a father who is mourning the loss of his daughter due to a car crash, and in 2011 he appeared as NYPD Head of Intelligence Deputy Commissioner Soren in "Hall of Mirrors," the thirteenth episode of the first season of the CBS show Blue Bloods.

In the 2010s, Servitto was a series regular on the original HBO series Banshee, where he plays Deputy Brock Lotus, and on the Adult Swim television series Your Pretty Face Is Going to Hell, where he plays Satan. He also played the role of Dr. Sebastian Reifler for three episodes on the TV series The Blacklist.

During the COVID-19 pandemic, Servitto directed and starred in the horror Western film A Town Called Purgatory, which screened at film festivals in 2024.

== Filmography ==
=== Film ===
Year	Title	Role	Notes
1992	Mad Dog Coll	Charlie "Lucky" Luciano	
1992	Hit the Dutchman	Bo Weinberg	
1998	The Versace Murder	David Madson	
1998	The Siege	Journalist #1	
1999	Jesus Tells a Joke	Unknown Role	Short
1999	Saturn	Dr. Wrye	
1999	Cupidity	Joe Sorvino	Short
1999	Cherry	Customer	
2000	Two Family House	"Chipmunk"	
2001	Height of Cool	Uncle Sal	Short
2002	Garmento	Louie Purdaro	
2002	Linoleum	Joey	Short
2002	Crime and Punishment	Razumikhin, Rodion's Friend	
2003	The Killing Zone	Unknown Role	
2003	Nola	Nola's Stepfather	
2003	Rhinoceros Eyes	Bundy	
2004	Orson	Steve	Short
2004	Melinda and Melinda	Jack Oliver	
2005	Hitch	Eddie	
2006	The Big Bad Swim	Principal Miwaski	
2006	Mentor	Howard	
2006	The Floor	Vince	Short
2006	Fur	Handsome Client	
2006	Beautiful Ohio	Mr. Cubano	
2007	No Reservations	Doctor	
2007	Wifey	Milo	TV movie
2007	Spinning Into Butter	Mike Olsen	
2007	The Agency	Lionel Calvin	TV movie
2007	Enchanted	Arty	
2007	I Do & I Don't	Dick Stelmack	
2008	The Project	Dan Masterson	
2009	Big Fan	Detective Velardi	
2009	Confessions of a Shopaholic	Head Waiter	
2009	Welcome to Academia	Weldman	
2009	The Superagent	Steve Blank	TV movie
2010	Going the Distance	Hugh	
2010	The Last Session	Therapist	Short
2010	Superego	Television Host	TV movie
2011	Faith	Mack	Short
2012	Compliance	Supplier	
2012	Price Check	Jim Brady	
2012	Hannah Has a Ho-Phase	Bob	
2013	Couch	Eddie	Short
2013	N.Y.C. Underground	Ernie Parker	Video
2014	Foreclosure	Officer Wright	
2017	The Night Watchmen	Willy	
2018	Zeroes	S.S.	
2018	Vox Lux	Celeste's Father	
2021	Good Head	Cooper Bradley	Short
2021	A Comedy of Horrors, Volume 1	Cooper	
2022	Disenchanted	Mover	
2023	The Jester	John Wheeler	
2023	Dangerous Waters	Agent Friedman	
2024	Stinky Summer	Sheriff	
2024	A Town Called Purgatory	Frank Sparks	
2025	The Alto Knights	George Wolf	

=== Television ===
Year	Title	Role	Notes
1989–90	All My Children	Trask Bodine	Regular cast
1993	As the World Turns	Cesare	Episode: "Episode dated 29 April 1993"
1995	One Life to Live	Lieutenant Nick Manzo	Episode: "Episode #1.6860" & "#1.6955"
1996	New York Undercover	Raymond Nunez	Episode: "Without Mercy"
1999	Third Watch	Frank Bartlett	Episode: "Hell Is What You Make of It"
1999	Law & Order	Jordan Grimaldi	Episode: "Blood Money"
1999–2007	The Sopranos	FBI Special Agent Dwight Harris	Recurring cast
2001	Ed	Donnie	Episode: "A Job Well Done"
2001	Law & Order: Special Victims Unit	Brad Stanton	Episode: "Parasites"
2001	Law & Order: Criminal Intent	Derek Freed	Episode: "The Pardoner's Tale"
2002	Sex and the City	Gabe	Episode: "Unoriginal Sin"
2002	NYPD Blue	Charlie Mullin	Episode: "You've Got Mail"
2002	Law & Order: Special Victims Unit	Doug	Episode: "Lust"
2002–2003	Hack	Marty Glavin	Episode: "Bad Choices" & "All Others Pay Cash"
2003	Queens Supreme	Alan Wheeler	Episode: "Pilot"
2003	Law & Order: Special Victims Unit	Fred Hopkins	Episode: "Grief"
2005	Law & Order: Criminal Intent	Jim Radcliff	Episode: "Sex Club"
2006	Conviction	Gelman	Episode: "Pilot"
2006–2008	Brotherhood	Representative Donatello	Recurring cast
2009	The Unusuals	Dr. Andre Zamacona	Episode: "The E.I.D."
2009	The Good Wife	Walt Gifford	Episode: "Unprepared"
2009–2010	Law & Order	U.S. Attorney Horvath	Guest cast: Season 19-20
2010	Past Life	Lou Cates	Episode: "Pilot"
2010	Mercy	Frank Sloan	Recurring cast
2010	Running Wilde	Rich Doyle	Episode: "Oil & Water"
2011	Royal Pains	Eddie's Attorney	Episode: "Mulligan"
2011	Blue Bloods	Soren	Episode: "Hall of Mirrors"
2011	Suits	Mr. Hunt's Lawyer	Episode: "Pilot"
2011	The Onion News Network	Dr. Cattey	Episode: "Asteroid Heads to Earth"
2011	Person of Interest	Samuel Douglas	Episode: "The Fix"
2011	Prime Suspect	Dr. Philbin	Episode: "The Great Wall of Silence"
2011–2012	Harry's Law	Judge Lucas Kirkland	Recurring cast: Season 2
2012	Grey's Anatomy	Ray Jones	Episode: "All You Need Is Love"
2012	Body of Proof	Mr. Whirley	Episode: "Identity"
2012	Unforgettable	Dan Marston	Episode: "A Man in the Woods"
2013	The Mentalist	Warren Dodge	Episode: "Behind the Red Curtain"
2013	Alpha House	Dan Cipriania-Maloney	Episode: "Zingers"
2013–2016	Banshee	Deputy Brock Lotus	Main cast
2013–2016	Banshee Origins	Deputy Brock Lotus	Recurring cast
2013–2019	Your Pretty Face Is Going to Hell	"Satan" / Darren Farley	Main cast
2015	Brooklyn Animal Control	Tim Tooley	Episode: "Episode #1.1"
2016	Elementary	Captain Will Lombardi	Episode: "A View with a Room"
2016	The Blacklist	Dr. Sebastian Reifler	Recurring cast: Season 4
2017	Making History	Paul Revere	Unknown episodes
2017–18	NCIS: New Orleans	Captain Carl Estes	Guest: Season 3, Recurring cast: Season 4
2017–2023	Billions	Bob Sweeney	Guest: Season 2-3 & 7, Recurring cast: Season 4-6
2018	Homeland	Agent Maslin	Recurring cast: Season 7
2018	Bull	Marshall Hitchcock	Episode: "The Ground Beneath Their Feet"
2019	Jon Glaser Loves Gear	Sandy	Episode: "Swing Dancing"
2019	Alternatino with Arturo Castro	American crime boss	Episode: "The Pivot"
2019	Prodigal Son	Father Leo	Episode: "Family Friend"
2020	Tommy	Bevins	Episode: "19 Hour Day"
2023	Barry	Gale Winograde	Episode: "bestest place on the earth"
2024	Royal Crackers	Carl Langley (voice)	Episode: "Tracker"

=== Video games ===
Year	Title	Role
2002	Mafia	Sam (voice)
2011	Star Wars: The Old Republic	Additional Voices (voice)
