= The Night Watchmen (film) =

- Film poster
- Directed by: Mitchell Altieri
- Written by: Ken Arnold; Dan De Luca; Jamie Nash
- Produced by: Jeffrey Allard; Ken Arnold; Dan De Luca
- Starring: Ken Arnold; Max Gray Wilbur; Dan De Luca; Kevin Jiggetts; Kara Luiz
- Cinematography: Amanda Treyz
- Edited by: Brett Solem
- Music by: Kevin Kerrigan
- Release date: November 27, 2017
- Running time: 80 minutes
- Country: United States
- Language: English

The Night Watchmen is a 2017 horror film. The film was directed by Mitchell Altieri, and was written by Ken Arnold, Dan DeLuca and Jamie Nash.

== Plot ==
A group of overnight security guards are hazing a new recruit who has been hired on to guard a Baltimore newspaper office. Part of the hazing includes forcing him to wear a uniform bearing the name "Rajeeve" and answering to this name. He also meets Karen, an attractive reporter that is frequently ogled by the guards.

Unbeknownst to the group, the dead body of the clown Blimpo has been delivered to the office. He and his comedy troupe had died while touring in Romania under mysterious circumstances and their bodies sent to the United States to be autopsied. The two delivery men responsible for delivering Blimpo's corpse properly bribe the watchmen with weed so they will keep the corpse until the following day. The clown awakens as a vampire and begins to kill and transform the building's occupants so that they can join in the hunt. Those that are turned into a vampire include the newspaper boss Randall and the two stoner delivery men.

Eventually only a handful of people remain: Rajeeve, Karen, and fellow night watchmen Ken, Luca, and Jiggets. The group is separated by the vampire horde, leaving Ken and Rajeeve together. Ken gives Rajeeve a pep talk in order to motivate him to fight the horde and save the others, however Rajeeve decides to leave on his own. He soon changes his mind and decides to return and fight, using the bribe weed in the ventilation system to mellow out the vampires. This proves to be successful and allows the group to reunite.

The group manages to defeat Blimpo and escape the office building, as they believe it to be dawn and that the light will eliminate the remaining vampires. They soon discover that their calculation was incorrect and that they still have a few moments of night left. The horde attacks them and rips off the back of Rajeeve's shirt, revealing that he has a large cross tattoo. The group manages to repel the vampires using the tattoo until the sun rises and destroys the horde. As they revel in the knowledge that they have survived, Rajeeve reveals his actual name to be Justin. Ken then informs the group that they must now save the world from any remaining vampires.

== Cast ==
- Ken Arnold as Ken
- Max Gray Wilbur as Rajeeve / Justin
- Dan DeLuca as Luca
- Kevin Jiggetts as Jiggetts
- Kara Luiz as Karen
- Diona Reasonover as Penny
- James Remar as Randall
- Matt Servitto as Willy

== Release ==
The Night Watchmen had its world premiere screening at the 2017 Cinequest Film Festival, followed by multiple screenings at other film festivals that included the Molins Film Festival, DCIFF, and Dead by Dawn. The film was later released to the Internet on November 21 of the same year.

== Reception ==
The Night Watchmen has a rating of 86% on review aggregator site Rotten Tomatoes, based on 7 reviews.

=== Awards ===
- Best of Metro DC at the 2017 DCIFF (won)
