= Dan DeLuca =

American actor

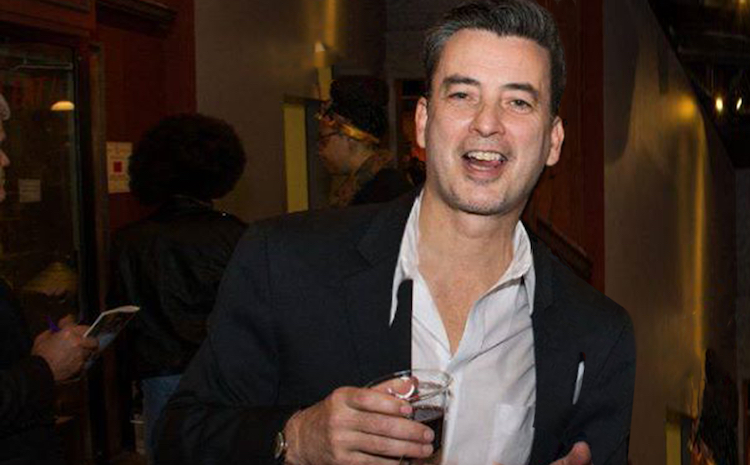
- Born: November 11, 1970 (age 55)
- Education: Herbert Berghof Studio; Southeast Missouri State University
- Occupation: Actor/Writer/Filmmaker

Dan DeLuca (born November 11, 1970) is an American actor, writer, and filmmaker, best known for his role as Dr. David Parenti in the HBO television series The Wire.

== Education and career ==
DeLuca studied acting at the Herbert Berghof Studio in New York. He has a master's degree in business from Southeast Missouri State University.

DeLuca co-directed and produced the feature film Eco-Teens Save the World, with Academy Award Winner Shirley Jones and Emmy Nominee Corbin Bernsen. He is also the director of the feature film Two-Minute Heist. He was the writer, producer, and second unit director of the feature film Crazy Eights. " Dan has worked extensively with Actor and Filmmaker, Ken Arnold. Together they have written, and produced three feature films, The Night Watchmen, A Comedy of Horrors Volume 1 and A Town Called Purgatory.

He is best known for his role in season 4 of HBO's The Wire, in which he portrays the real-life inspired character of Dr. David Parenti. The role partnered him with veteran actor Robert Wisdom as "Bunny Colvin."

DeLuca has also had roles in HBO's Veep and House of Cards.

In 2009 he won Best Actor and Best Director at The NYIIFF Festival. In 2014 he won Best Performance at the 2014 ZED Film Festival. Other awards include the 2015 Best Feature/Audience Award at the Alexandria International Film Festival, Best Feature at the Boston International Kids Family Festival, and Best Feature at the Louisville International Film Festival, for On the Wing.

During the COVID-19 pandemic, DeLuca and Arnold co-wrote and starred in the horror Western film A Town Called Purgatory, which screened at film festivals in 2024.

DeLuca is also a novelist, penning the Horror Detective series, "Marchetti & Walsh: The Dark Files."

== Filmography ==
=== Film ===
Year	Title	Role	Notes
2024	A Town Called Purgatory	Cody Parnum	
2023	The Bermuda Triangle Project	Detective Delany	
2023	The Jester	Officer Uno	
2023	Rustin	March Journalist	Netflix
2021	A Comedy of Horrors Vol. 1	Deputy Dimples	
2020	Wonder Woman 1984	Convoy	
2018	Eco-Teens Save the World	Dirk Diaper	
2017	The Night Watchmen	Luca	
2014	Veep	Photographer	
2013	Forbidden	Matt Cox	
2013	House of Cards	Galloway Friend #4	
2010	Jack of Spades	Tyler Langston	
2009	Two-Minute Heist	Dino Rado	
2007	Rocket Science	Stephen Douglas	
2006	The Wire	Dr. David Parenti	
2006	Crazy Eights	Wayne Morrison	
2004	A Bad Thing Gone Worse	Marcus West	
2002	America's Most Wanted	Tony A.	
