= Curves International =

International fitness center chain (US founded 1992)

- Type: Physical Exercise
- Industry: Fitness Franchising
- Founded: Harlingen, Texas (1992)
- Headquarters: Waco, Texas
- Key people: Krishea Holloway, President
- Products: Weight loss Fitness; Exercise
- Revenue: ▼ -$20.4 million USD (2015)
- Owner: Koshidaka Holdings
- Website: www.curves.com

Curves International, also known as Curves for Women, Curves Fitness, or just Curves, is an international fitness franchise co-founded by Gary and Diane Heavin in 1992. As of May 31, 2019, Curves lists 367 franchise locations open in the United States on their Facebook page.

In 2012, North Castle Partners, a private equity firm, purchased a controlling stake in the company. The company is privately held by its co-founders and North Castle, with its headquarters located in Waco, Texas and corporate offices located with sister North Castle company Jenny Craig in Carlsbad, California. Curves fitness and weight loss facilities are designed specifically for and focused on women, although in some states, men are allowed to join.

The clubs compete with other women's-only chain health clubs, including Spa Lady and Lucille Roberts. However, Curves is still the largest women's-only health club chain in the US and worldwide.

In 2018 with the sale of Curves International by North Castle Partners to Koshidaka Holdings, Curves North America and Oceania headquarters relocated back to Waco, TX.

== History ==
Curves was founded by Gary Heavin and his wife, Diane. They opened their first Curves in Harlingen, Texas, in 1992. This new concept of 30-minute fitness, strength training, weight-loss guidance, and an environment designed for women was immediately successful. They began to develop plans for franchising the concept, with the first opening in 1999. Curves once claimed to be the world's largest fitness franchise and was recognized as one of the 10 largest franchise companies in the world in 2005. According to Curves International Inc's fact sheet, Curves achieved 6,000 franchises in 7 years. Curves facilities are located in 39 countries, including the United States, Canada, Mexico, Australia, New Zealand, and Japan. Curves is known as FitCurves in Ukraine, Slovakia, Bulgaria, Romania, and the Czech Republic.

In October 2006, Curves was said to have had over 10,000 locations worldwide, with 7,848 of those locations in the United States.

Curves fitness and weight loss facilities are designed specifically for and focused on women. The program is designed around circuit training, which utilizes hydraulic resistance equipment to achieve results. The strength training regimen is combined with cardiovascular training for a full body workout, with each class led by a ‘Curves Coach’. There are four speciality classes, each of which is designed for different fitness levels from low intensity to high intensity, with one of the high intensity classes utilizing traditional boxing moves. All speciality classes emphasize strength-based functional movements.

Curves also provide additional programs alongside their traditional gym workouts. Curves Nutrition and Weight Management Program is a fully integrated, personalized weight loss and weight management program with customizable meal plans and one-on-one coaching support alongside the Curves fitness program. In 2020, Curves also expanded their service offering to include their Health and Wellness education series, providing members with educational courses across women’s health issues to help make lifestyle improvements.

== Curves Leadership ==
In 2012, Gary Heavin stepped down as CEO and sold the business to North Castle Partners. In 2018, North Castle Partners sold Curves International to Koshidaka Holdings (Curves Japan) while retaining Curves North America and Oceania. Krishea Holloway, was appointed President of Curves on 22 November 2018. On 15 August 2019, in a deal between North Castle Partners, existing Shareholders and Holloway, Curves DF Holdings sold the business to Holloway.

== MyCurves On Demand ==
Like many gym and health club chains, Curves was significantly affected by the COVID-19 pandemic, with many clubs in the US, Canada, Australia and New Zealand closing temporarily or permanently. To manage the crisis and enable members to continue working out, Curves was able to offer their 30-minute total body workouts online with ‘MyCurves On Demand’, a virtual workout platform which launched in January 2020.

This program provides members with unlimited access to the Curves fitness program through an online platform, with hundreds of workouts available focusing on strength training, aerobics and balance exercises, as well as express and live-streamed workouts. The workouts are led by ‘Curves Coaches’ and conducted with a resistance band that is provided with select memberships. In 2021, MyCurves On Demand also introduced a virtual group coaching membership, combining the at-home fitness program with the support of a live, virtual Curves Coach to keep members accountable for achieving their health and fitness goals. MyCurves On Demand is currently available in the US, Canada, Australia, and New Zealand.

== Research at Baylor University ==
In 2002, the Exercise & Sports Nutrition Laboratory at Baylor University began researching the efficacy of the Curves fitness and weight loss program. Curves awarded the ESNL a $5 million, five-year grant to start the Curves Women's Health Initiative.

In 2008 this grant funding moved with Dr. Richard Kreider to Texas A&M University.

== Gary Heavin's charitable contributions ==
In 2004, Curves International and its franchisees received some mixed and unwanted publicity stemming from articles about the charitable contributions of founder Gary Heavin.

In an interview with Christianity Today, Heavin was quoted as saying that he donates money to "pro-life pregnancy care centers."

The San Francisco Chronicle printed an article by Ruth Rosen, accusing Heavin of supporting militant anti-abortion groups. However, in an open letter to the Chronicle, Heavin challenged Rosen's characterization of his contributions. The Chronicle later published a correction which included a breakdown of the contributions in question. The contributions were given to three groups, Family Practice Center of McLennan County ($3.75 million), McLennan County Collaborative Abstinence Project ($275,000) and Care Net ($1 million.)

Numerous blogs picked up Rosen's version of the story, and several other articles on the subject subsequently appeared in other mainstream media. The publicity affected business at some individual franchises, particularly in the U.S. West Coast region (specifically California) and a few in the Atlantic Northeast and Pacific Northwest, causing an uproar from franchisees of Curves International.

Despite this attempted re-characterization of the donations, business was affected, with memberships down and some franchisees severing their ties with Curves.

In 2020, Heavin donated $10,000 to the far-right organization Oath Keepers. Heavin was questioned about the contribution and stated it was to support constitutional rights and didn't know what the group did with it.

== Curves Charitable Contributions ==
Curves support and has partnered with several major charitable organizations in North America and Australasia, including the American Cancer Society (ACS), the Canadian Cancer Society, Cancer Council Australia, WomenAgainstAlzheimer's, Jean Hailes for Women's Health and Look Good Feel Better New Zealand. Curves has been recognized for its charitable efforts, including awards from the American Cancer Society in 2008, 2009, 2011, 2012 and 2014.

== Buyout-related lawsuit ==
In 2005, six plaintiffs brought a suit against Curves, Gary Heavin, and Roger Schmidt (the company's attorney) for $20 million. The plaintiffs claimed that Heavin cheated them out of their share of profits by him and Roger Schmidt pressuring them to sign a buyout contract allotting them a fraction of what they might have earned.

Most of the plaintiffs were hired as independent sales reps after Curves had already opened hundreds of locations. The lawsuit failed to mention that the sales reps were paid more than $26 million for their work.
