= Jim Gillespie (director) =

Scottish film director

Jim Gillespie (1960) is a Scottish film director. His directing work includes I Know What You Did Last Summer (1997), D-Tox (2002), and Venom (2005).

== Filmography ==
=== Films ===
Year	Film	Credited as				Reference
Year	Film	Director	Writer	Producer	Other	Reference
1984	Comfort and Joy				Yes	
1985	Restless Natives				Yes	
1995	Joyride	Yes	Yes			
1997	I Know What You Did Last Summer	Yes				
2002	D-Tox	Yes				
2005	Venom	Yes				
2016	Billionaire Ransom	Yes				
