= Steven Kaplan (Pennsylvania official) =

American politician

Steven Kaplan was the Secretary of the Pennsylvania Department of Banking.
