= Lucille Roberts =

American businesswoman and entrepreneur

Lucille Roberts (December 7, 1943 – July 17, 2003) was an American businesswoman and entrepreneur who founded the Lucille Roberts chain of health clubs. A self-proclaimed "exercise nut," she turned her passion for working out into a health club empire worth $30 million at the time of her death.

== Early years ==
Born into a Jewish family in Tajikistan, Roberts and her family emigrated to the United States and settled in Brooklyn, New York in the early 1950s. An immigration intake official, as was often done at the time, altered the hard-to-pronounce names of the family. Since the young girl reminded her of the I Love Lucy television program, Laja's name was changed to Lucille. Roberts graduated from University of Pennsylvania (College for Women Class of 1964) and was one of the first women to earn a degree from Harvard Business School's Owner/President Management program.

== Career ==
In 1969, Roberts and her husband opened a spa in midtown Manhattan next to Macy's. Roberts' goal was to offer affordable exercise facilities geared towards women. In response to the public's confusion that it was an auto repair business (the original name of the gym was The Body Shop), she renamed it Lucille Roberts, a combination of her and her husband's first names, and eventually opened gyms in 50 other locations in the northeastern United States.

Roberts also wrote and published the books, Computercise and The Lucille Roberts 14 Day Makeover.

== Health Clubs ==
In its prime, there were over 50 Lucille Roberts health clubs. As of May 2025, almost all clubs have closed due to the bankruptcy of its parent, Town Sports International. The last surviving location of health clubs is in the Forest Hills neighborhood of Queens, New York. The chain's annual revenue was over $50 million and had around 200,000 members. The gyms helped spark a fitness movement for women's health that resulted in many more women-only fitness chains being launched.

The Lucille Roberts slogan was "more gym, less money" and Lucille prioritized health clubs that centered all aspects of a woman's life by offering free babysitting facilities, self defense classes, debt management, and training on how to report abusive husbands to the authorities.

== Death ==
Roberts died from lung cancer on July 17, 2003, aged 59, at a Manhattan hospital. She was survived by her husband, Bob Roberts, and their two children, Kevin and Kirk. After her death, the health clubs were run by her family and eventually sold to the parent company of New York Sports Club in 2017.
