= Gary Heavin =

American businessman from Texas (born 1955)

Gary Heavin (born 1955) is an American businessman from Texas. He is the founder of the fitness chain Curves International.

== Career ==
Heavin dropped out of college at age 20 and took over a failing fitness center in Houston, Texas. Along with his brother David, he built the business into a chain of 14 locations. He was a millionaire by age 25 but then lost it all by age 30; he filed for bankruptcy.

After his first marriage, Heavin was sentenced to jail for failure to pay child support. While in jail he rededicated his life to Jesus Christ, and he has been outspoken about his support of anti-abortion causes.

In 2004 Heavin was named the Ernst & Young Entrepreneur of the Year. He is also the author of several books, including Curves: Permanent Results Without Permanent Dieting and Curves On the Go.

Heavin and his second wife Diane opened their first Curves center in 1992 in Harlingen, Texas. Curves is now based in Waco, Texas.

By 2007, Curves had over 10,000 locations and was the largest fitness chain in the world. However, since selling Curves to North Castle Partners, a private equity company, more than 75% of the Curves franchises have closed. North America is now the home of approximately 600 Curves franchises.

The Heavins currently reside in Mound in central Texas. On 3 April 2011, they were featured on ABC's show Secret Millionaire, where they gave away $410,000.

Gary and Diane Heavin have recently begun to produce politically conservative and Christian themed films. Mission Air is a Christian movie that has been available since 2013. Amerigeddon is an action adventure film that opened in 30 theaters on 13 May 2016, the plot of which surrounds the takeover of America by a UN/Globalist supported terrorist organization.

== Views ==
Heavin was a guest on The Ron Paul Liberty Report on April 4th 2018, and has referred to himself as a "right-to-life" libertarian and is for a non-interventionist foreign policy.

In 2020, Heavin gave $10,000 to the Oath Keepers, a right-wing anti-government militia organization that purportedly helped lead the 2021 United States Capitol attack.
