= Steve Kaplan (entrepreneur) =

American entrepreneur

Steven Kaplan
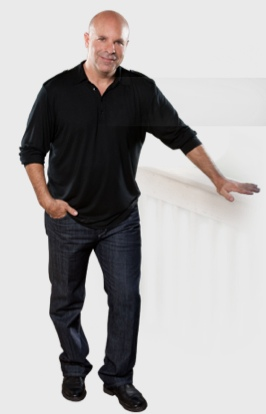
- Born: March 25, 1960 (age 66); Illinois, U.S.
- Occupations: Business Success Expert, Author, and Public Speaker
- Website: Steve Kaplan Live

Steve Kaplan (born March 25, 1960) is an American entrepreneur, author, and public speaker.

== Start of career ==
Kaplan built SCA- a 1300 employee, international marketing firm -before selling it to Snyder Communications(NYSE: SNC). In January 2000, SNC officially launched Bounty SCA Worldwide, a division that organizes the marketing services businesses it has acquired over the previous few years. Kaplan served as the CEO of Bounty SCA Worldwide under Snyder Communications which was sold to Havas.

== Books ==
Kaplan went on to write about these experiences of starting, building and selling SCA. He is the author of Bag the Elephant, Be the Elephant, and Sell Your Business for the Max. Bag the Elephant received the Benjamin Franklin Award as the Business Book of the Year.

== Bibliography ==
- Bag the Elephant!: How to Win and Keep Big Customers. Published by Bard Press, 2005. ISBN 1-885167-62-8.
- Be the Elephant: Build A Bigger, Better, Business. Published by Workman Publishing Company Inc., 2006. ISBN 0-7611-4448-X.
- Sell Your Business for the Max! Published by Workman Publishing Company, Inc., 2009. ISBN 0-7611-4784-5.

== Secret Millionaire ==
Kaplan appeared on ABC's show Secret Millionaire where he travels to the south side of Chicago to donate money to charities in need.

== Military tour ==
In 2013, Kaplan joined “Operation Hot.” Along with Chef Charles Carroll, Chef Robert Irvine, and others, he toured Afghanistan speaking to troops on getting jobs and starting businesses to better prepare them for redeployment back to the US.

== World Arm Wrestling League ==
Kaplan currently is the President of the World Arm Wrestling League LLC and the Commissioner of the World Arm Wrestling League (WAL).

== Business ventures ==
Kaplan is a minority owner in esports team Immortals.
