= Hopewell Valley Central High School =

High school in Mercer County, New Jersey, US

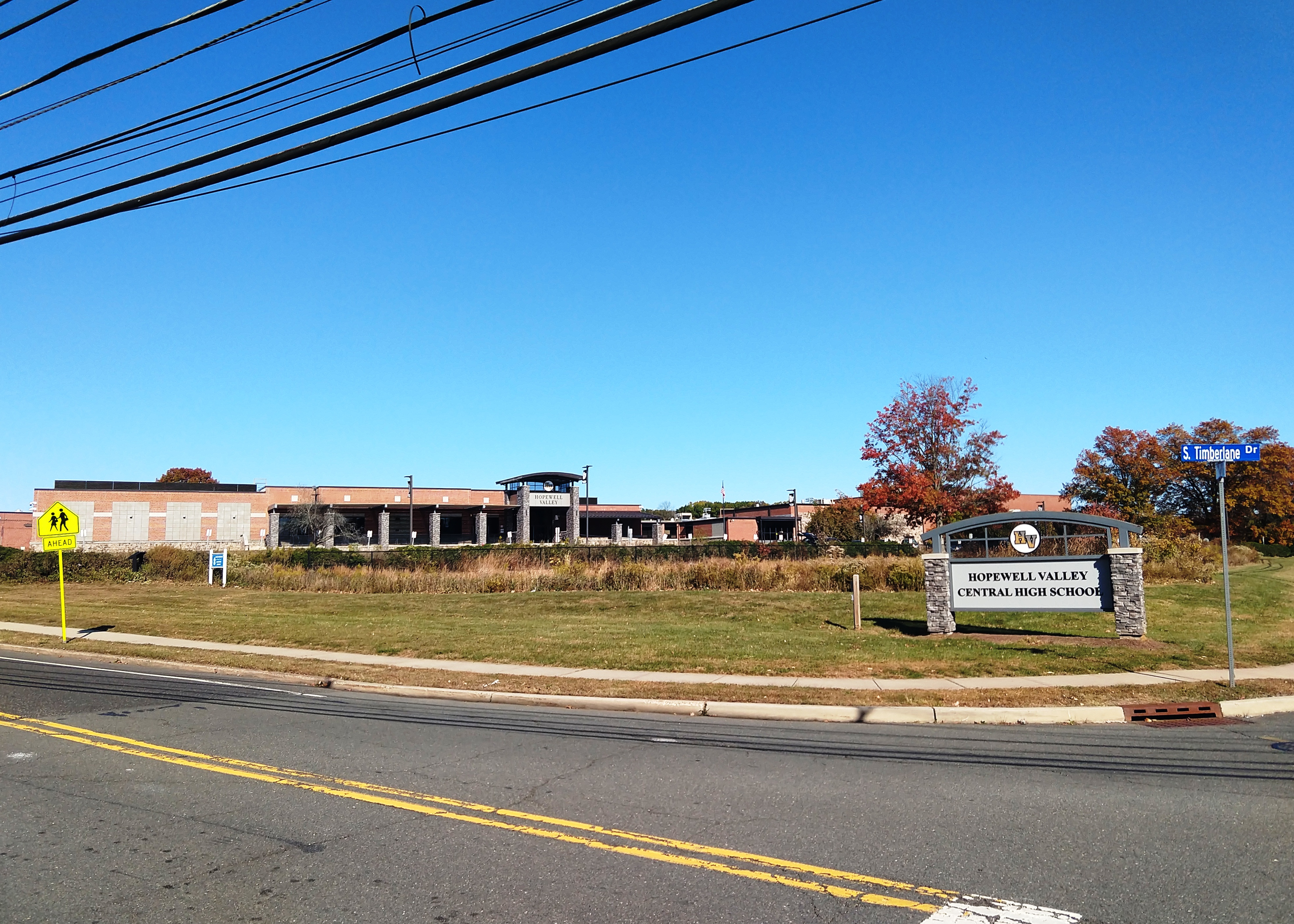

Location
- 259 Pennington-Titusville Road; Hopewell Township, Mercer County, New Jersey 08534; United States; 40.327012°N 74.803117°W

Information
- Type: Public high school
- Established: 1907
- School district: Hopewell Valley Regional School District
- NCES School ID: 340753003136
- Principal: Patricia Riley
- Faculty: 105.4 FTEs
- Grades: 9-12
- Enrollment: 1,068 (as of 2024–25)
- Student to teacher ratio: 10.1:1
- Campus: Rural
- Colors: Black and Vegas gold
- Fight song: Salutation (trio) by Roland F. Seitz
- Athletics conference: Colonial Valley Conference (general); West Jersey Football League (football)
- Team name: Bulldogs
- Rivals: Pennington School; Notre Dame High School; Lawrence High School
- Publication: Panorama (literary magazine)
- Newspaper: The Bulldog Reporter
- Yearbook: Centralogue
- Feeder schools: Timberlane Middle School
- Website: hvchs.hvrsd.org

Hopewell Valley Central High School is a four-year comprehensive public high school operating as part of the Hopewell Valley Regional School District that serves students in ninth through twelfth grades from Hopewell Borough, Hopewell Township and Pennington Borough, three communities in Mercer County, in the U.S. state of New Jersey. Although the high school has a Pennington mailing address, it is located within the political boundaries of Hopewell Township, just outside Pennington Borough.

As of the 2024–25 school year, the school had an enrollment of 1,068 students and 105.4 classroom teachers (on an FTE basis), for a student–teacher ratio of 10.1:1. There were 55 students (5.1% of enrollment) eligible for free lunch and 10 (0.9% of students) eligible for reduced-cost lunch.

== History ==
The district's first high school was established in 1907, with a separate high school facility constructed in Hopewell Borough in 1912 at a cost of $20,000 (equivalent to $667,000 in 2025). A second building was constructed in 1929, when a new facility was completed at a cost of $158,000 on 5 acres (2.0 ha) of land on a site in Pennington.

The current high school was built along Pennington-Titusville road in 1958. Since then, there have been multiple additions and renovations to the original building, including in 1965 and 1974 when additional classrooms and a library were built (the existing library was converted into offices for child study, guidance, and counseling). A 1997 addition added eight science classrooms and a band room, with older science rooms being renovated. In 2003, work was completed on a new 865-seat Performing Arts Center, a new gymnasium, as well as some classroom renovations as part of a referendum approved by voters in 2000. A 2016 referendum allowed for the addition of a new front entrance, a cafeteria extension, a black box theater, and an auxiliary gymnasium, along with significant HVAC improvements and roofing repairs. These were completed in 2018.

On February 16, 2017, Fried Chicken was an option on that days lunch menu. The sign that had the menu had a heading that read, "In Celebration of Black History Month we have a Special Menu Today!" The superintendent of Hopewell Valley Regional School District, Thomas A. Smith, apologized for the racial stereotypes that were being promoted by putting fried chicken on the menu. The district's food vendor, Pomptonian, stated that one of the company's directors worked with an administrator of the district to create the menu for that day. At the time, Hopewell Valley had 1,200 total students, of whom 82% of the students were white (about 984 students) and about 3.8% were black (about 46 students).

== Profile ==
The Hopewell Valley Central High School credo is that the school is a "high-performing, high-achieving school with a soul." HVCHS encourages and fosters partnerships between teachers, students, parents, and the community. The Municipal Alliance and Healthy Communities/Healthy Youth play a key role in the "Culture of Respect." Students are involved in service organizations with community outreach programs.

Hopewell Valley Central High School provides a curriculum that is broad, diversified and comprehensive, allowing students to structure their own challenges. HVCHS encourages high expectations and achievement.

== Awards, recognition and rankings ==
The school was the 41st-ranked public high school in New Jersey out of 339 schools statewide in New Jersey Monthly magazine's September 2014 cover story on the state's "Top Public High Schools", using a new ranking methodology. The school had been ranked 31st in the state of 328 schools in 2012, after being ranked 38th in 2010 out of 322 schools listed. The magazine ranked the school 39th in 2008 out of 316 schools. Schooldigger.com ranked the school 101st out of 381 public high schools statewide in its 2011 rankings (a decrease of 31 positions from the 2010 ranking) which were based on the combined percentage of students classified as proficient or above proficient on the mathematics (87.8%) and language arts literacy (95.4%) components of the High School Proficiency Assessment (HSPA).

In the 2011 "Ranking America's High Schools" issue by The Washington Post, the school was ranked 57th in New Jersey and 1,666th nationwide.

In Newsweek's May 20, 2012, issue, ranking the country's top high schools, Hopewell Valley Central High School was listed in 427th place, the 39th-highest ranked school in New Jersey. In the magazine's 2007 rankings, Hopewell Valley Central High School was listed in 1239th place, the 42nd-highest ranked school in New Jersey.

In its 2013 report on "America's Best High Schools", The Daily Beast ranked the school 638th in the nation among participating public high schools and 50th among schools in New Jersey.

== Academics ==
Hopewell Valley Central High School offers 26 different AP courses, as well as three dual-enrollment courses in conjunction with Syracuse University.

=== Science ===
The HVCHS Envirothon Team placed first in the 11th Annual New Jersey Envirothon Competition at the School of Conservation in Stokes State Forest. The team then represented the state of New Jersey and placed third in the National Envirothon held at West Virginia Wesleyan College.

=== Performing arts ===
The high school music program is on an upward trend. It has been twice named a finalist in the Grammy Foundation's Grammy Signature Schools program. In 2004, the program was named to the American Music Conference's list of the "Best 100 Communities for Music Education in America". The NAMM organization has recognized the school's music program on multiple occasions, including both 2009 and 2010.

In regional and national competitions, the band, choir, and orchestra have been recognized for excellence. The choir program has received top ratings at festivals since 2002 and was selected for the 2006 National Choral Invitational Festival of Gold in New York City. The choirs were treated to a one-week workshop with choral composer Stephen Hatfield. The symphonic band has worked with several musical notables, including the Dallas Brass and Houston-based composer Michael Story.

The Marching Black and Gold, an extracurricular marching band established in 2007, has achieved top ratings in many area competitions. The band performs at varsity football games, participates in Memorial Day parades and other celebrations in Hopewell Valley, and has traveled to participate at Festival Disney in Florida and other locations across the eastern United States. Alumni of the Marching Black and Gold have gone on to join prestigious marching bands at colleges and universities across the US. Some have participated in drum and bugle corps associated with Drum Corps International and Drum Corps Associates.

The school offers a four-year, sequential, curricular program in theater arts. An 865-seat Performing Arts Center opened at the high school in 2003, and is now used by the community and music programs in the district. Graduates of Hopewell's Performing Arts programs have gone on to major in various performing arts fields in college.

=== Visual arts ===
The visual arts department is comprehensive and sequential and its curriculum culminates in the various AP art courses. Student artists have received accolades for works in various local, state, and national art shows as they successfully placed first, second, and third in these juried art show competitions.

== Athletics ==
The Hopewell Valley Central High School Bulldogs compete in the Colonial Valley Conference, which is comprised of public and private high schools in Mercer, Middlesex and Monmouth counties, operating under the supervision of the New Jersey State Interscholastic Athletic Association (NJSIAA). With 838 students in grades 10–12, the school was classified by the NJSIAA for the 2019–20 school year as Group III for most athletic competition purposes, which included schools with an enrollment of 761 to 1,058 students in that grade range. The football team competes in the Capitol Division of the 94-team West Jersey Football League superconference and was classified by the NJSIAA as Group III South for football for 2024–2026, which included schools with 695 to 882 students. Hopewell's athletic program offers 22 sports.

The school participates as the host school / lead agency for a joint ice hockey team with Montgomery High School. The co-op program operates under agreements scheduled to expire at the end of the 2023–24 school year.

Hopewell Valley has a longstanding rivalry with the Pennington School. Other rivals include Notre Dame High School and Lawrence High School.

After suspending the football program in 1932, the school reinstituted the program after a 70-year hiatus, due to the founding of HIKE Hopewell Involved in Kids Enrichment, a non-profit which raised the funds to bring a high School Football team back to HVRSD. Hundreds of citizens and students worked multiple fund raising events to raise money to fund the first 5 years of the football program. The first team the freshman team which was made of a combination of freshman and sophomore athletes (due to league regulations) beginning play in 2002. The re-established football program's first varsity victory came on October 17, 2005, with a 28–6 win against West Windsor-Plainsboro High School North. The Bulldogs had been able to successfully start their first Varsity level season in 2004. Although winless, the community celebrated the fact that Varsity Football was once again being played at the HVCHS. The 2006 season had the Bulldogs going 3–6, and tying for the Colonial Valley Conference Patriot Division title with Ewing High School and West Windsor Plainsboro North. The 2007 season was even more successful for the Hopewell Varsity football team, going 5–4, and again tying for the Patriot Division title. In 2008, the Bulldogs had another winning season, at 6–4. At Homecoming, the crowds number in the thousands. In 2013, the HV Bulldogs finished the program's tenth varsity season with a 10–1 record, the best season in the ten years since the re-introduction of football, and defeated Lawrence High School by a score of 31–14 before 7,500 fans at The College of New Jersey to win the program's first Central Jersey Group III state sectional championship. It was the first time that two Mercer County teams had reached the finals in the same season and Hopewell Valley became the sixth team from the county to win a football sectional title.

The field hockey team won the Central Jersey Group II state sectional championship in 1976, 1977, 1981, 1985 and 1988.

In 1977, the baseball team finished the season with a record of 26–2 after winning the Group II state championship by defeating Lenape Valley Regional High School in the tournament final by a score of 3–2.

The girls' soccer team won the Group I/II state championship in 1982 (against runner-up Mahwah High School in the finals) and 1983 (as co-champion with Chatham Borough High School), and won the Group III title in 2009 (as co-champion with Northern Highlands Regional High School). In 2009, the team played a scoreless tie against Northern Highlands in the Group III state finals at The College of New Jersey, marking the first time Hopewell girls' varsity soccer team has claimed a state title since 1983.

The boys' soccer team won the Group II state championship in 1989, with a 3–2 win against Millburn High School in the tournament final played at Trenton State College. The 2005 boys' soccer team were co-champions of Mercer County, went undefeated in the CVC, won their division, won the Group III sectional title with a 2–1 win over Monroe Township High School and lost 3–2 in overtime to Ocean City High School in the state semi-finals. They were ranked 13th in the state at the end of the year.

The ice hockey team won the Mercer County Championship in 1999 (as co-champion with Hightstown High School) and 2008.

The girls' track team has won the Group II indoor relay championships in 1991 and each year from 2002 to 2009, winning the Group III title in 2010; the 10 state titles won by the program are tied for the most of any school in the state. The boys team won the Group III title in 2017 (as co-champion). In 2010, the girls winter track team set a state record by winning the state relays for its ninth consecutive year, a streak that ended in 2011.

In 1997, the golf team won the Group II state title, and defeated rival Group IV champion West Windsor-Plainsboro High School South in a one-hole playoff for the Tournament of Champions overall state championship. Along with the team honors, senior David Schmutz won the individual state title by three shots, and received First Team All-County, First Team All-State Group II, First Team, All-State, and State Player of the Year honors.

The girls' cross country team won the Group II state championship in 1999 and 2002, and won the Group II title in 2001.

The boys' cross country team won the Group II state championship in 1999.

The girls' track team won the Group II indoor /winter track championship in 2002, 2003, 2005 and 2007–2009; the program's six state titles are tied for sixth-most in New Jersey.

The girls' spring track team was the Group II state champion in 2003 and won the Group II title in 2005.

In 2003–04 Hopewell Valley Central High School teams won six Patriot Division Championships, two Mercer County Championships, and the Group II Winter Track Relay state championship. Championship teams included Boys Cross Country, Girls Soccer, Girls Tennis, Girls Basketball and Girls Track and Field. In addition, the CHS 4X4 relay team won the championship at the 2003 Penn Relays. The 2006 Girls' softball team won the Mercer County Tournament.

The men's cross country team went undefeated in Mercer County, won the Mercer County Championship, won the Central Jersey state championship, and placed second at the Group III state meet. The women's cross country team also went undefeated in the county, placed second in the Mercer County Championship, and was first at the Central Jersey state championship.

The 2007 girls' lacrosse team won the South, Group II state sectional championship with a 15–7 victory over Camden Catholic High School.

In 2010, the baseball team finished the season 21–10 and won the NJSIAA Central Jersey Group III state sectional championship over West Windsor-Plainsboro High School North by a score of 12–2.

In 2011, the girls' spring track team won the NJSIAA Group III state title for the seventh consecutive time.

== Clubs and organizations ==
Students at HVCHS are able to become involved in school clubs and organizations. Clubs and activities are focused on artistic, athletic, academic, and special interest areas. Over 60% of the 1,200 students compete in one of the 22 athletic programs or an extracurricular activity.

== Administration ==
The school's principal is Patricia Riley. Her core administration team includes two vice principals.

== Notable alumni ==
- Val Ackerman (born 1959), class of 1977, best known for being the first president of the Women's National Basketball Association, serving from 1996 to 2005
- Steve Braun (born 1948, class of 1966), former Major League Baseball player
- Simon Carcagno (born 1976), rower who competed in lightweight rowing and won a gold medal in the eights at the 2008 World Rowing Championships
- Danielia Cotton (born 1967), jazz singer, songwriter and guitarist
- Gregory S. Glasson (born 1974), bass player who has played for Grammy Award winning artist Seal both live onstage and in studio recordings
- Desiree Leigh Grace (born 1987/88), federal prosecutor
- Jim Himes (born 1966), Congressman from Connecticut's 4th congressional district
- Cassidy Hutchinson (born 1996, class of 2015), former aide to White House Chief of Staff Mark Meadows during the Trump administration who testified at a hearing of the United States House Select Committee on the January 6 Attack. At the school, she was a member of the girls' track team
- Liz Miele (born 1985), stand-up comedian and writer
- Cal Newport (class of 2000), computer science professor and author
- Mark Hsu Syers (1952–1983), Broadway actor
- John Tanguay (born 1998), rower who won a silver medal at the 2019 World Rowing Championships
- Colleen Williams (born 1991), former soccer forward and midfielder who played for the Washington Spirit in the National Women's Soccer League
- Jonathan Williams (born 1984/85), politician who has represented the Washington-3 district in the Vermont House of Representatives since 2023
