= David Jordan Bachner =

American baseball player

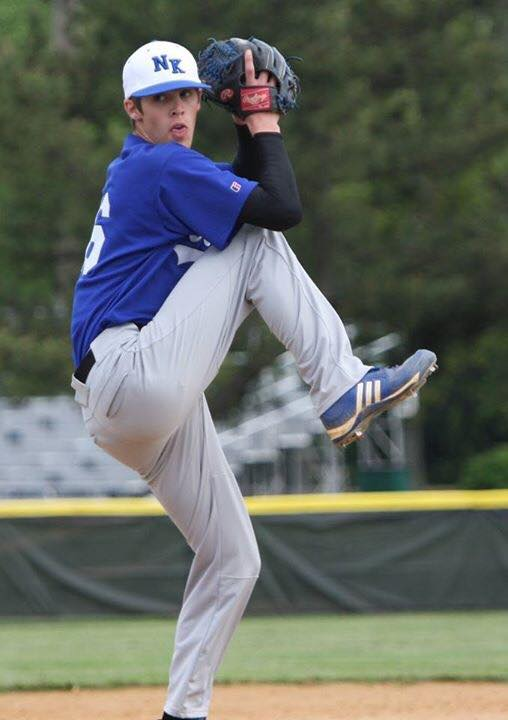
- Bachner in 2009.
- Born: David Jordan Bachner; January 16, 1991; Princeton, New Jersey
- Died: August 11, 2009 (aged 18); Plainsboro Township, New Jersey

David Jordan Bachner (January 16, 1991 – August 11, 2009), was a high school baseball player born in Princeton, New Jersey. He shared the captaincy of the West Windsor-Plainsboro High School North baseball team. He was named the Trenton Times and Trentonian Player of the Year in 2009.

He died suddenly in August 2009, leading to the creation of a charitable foundation in his name.

== Baseball career ==
Bachner set three West Windsor-Plainsboro High School North records with 17 wins and three losses, a 1.50 ERA and 239 strikeouts. His senior season was one of the best in New Jersey history with nine wins, two losses, a 0.97 ERA and 125 strikeouts in 64 2/3 innings.

Bachner pitched a no-hitter in May 2009 in the semifinal round of the Mercer County Tournament. He had 12 strikeouts in 109 pitches of the complete game. Bachner was a member of the WW-P North team which won the Central Jersey sectional title in May 2009.

Bachner was named 2009 Colonial Valley Conference Player of The Year.

== Illness and death ==
Bachner was diagnosed with a slight mitral valve disorder during a physical for Seton Hall. He wore a heart monitor during his American Legion season. He died of acute cardiac arrest.

Bachner was to attend Seton Hall University on a baseball scholarship.

Tom Verducci wrote in his September 1, 2009 Sports Illustrated article "David Bachner, by all accounts, touched everyone who knew him, even if they were unaware of his pitching talents. Teachers, school officials and students knew him by his smile, his confidence and his sincerity."

== The David J. Bachner Memorial Fund ==
The David J. Bachner Memorial Fund was established after David's death in his honor. Funds support children in need for their athletic activities, athletes who do not have the funds to secure a college scholarship and are also put towards the David J. Bachner scholarship award, presented to a graduating WW-P High North senior.

An annual David J. Bachner Memorial North vs. South Hockey Game is held every year to help support the Fund. Unhittable Apparel helps fund the Bachner charity. The Unhittable Across The World Facebook site contains thousands of images of supporters posing around the world wearing T-shirts and sweatshirts with "Unhittable." on the front and "Bachner 16" on the back.

== Renaming of baseball field ==
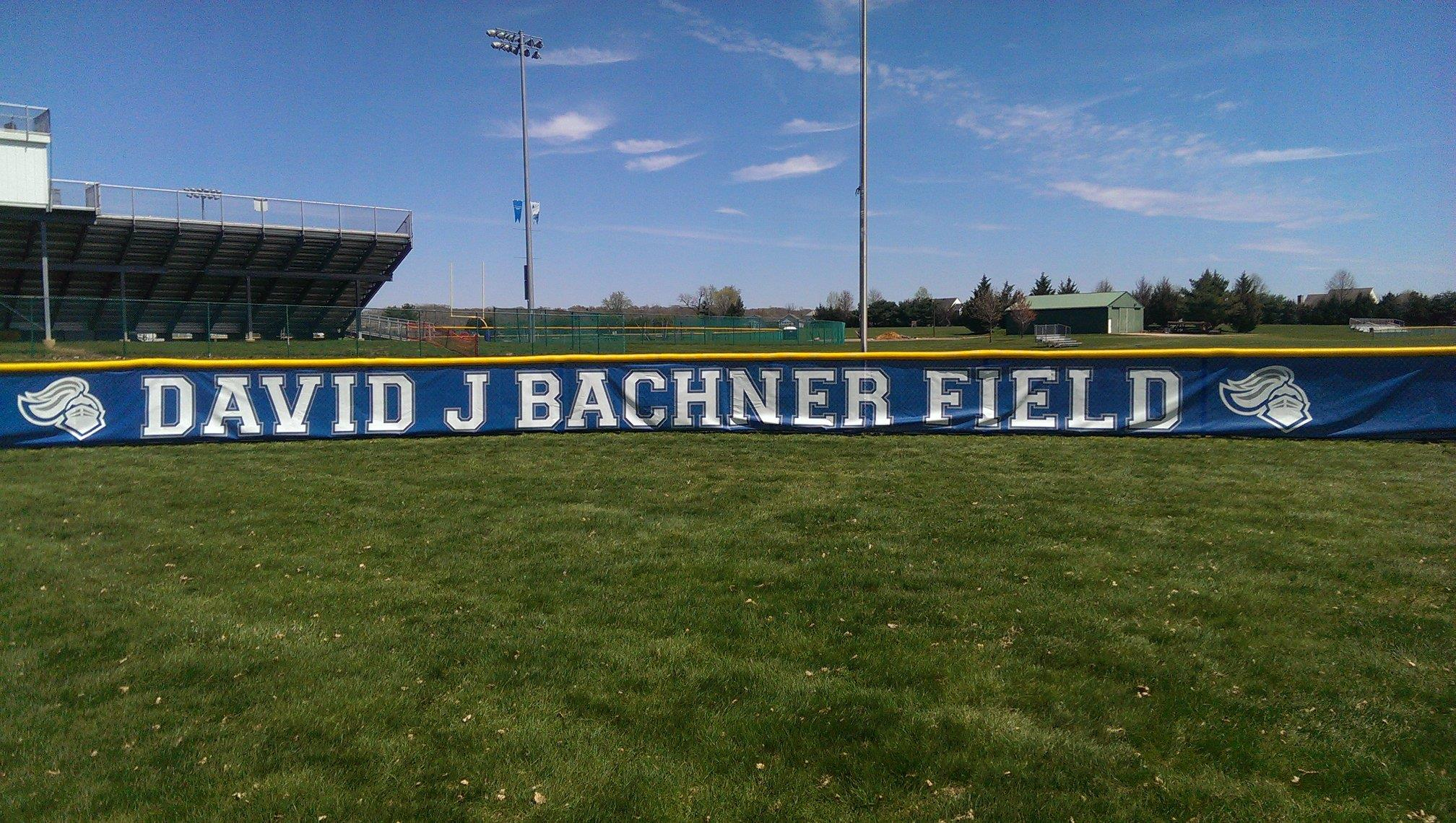
Banner naming the WWP North Varsity field in honor of David J Bachner

A five-year battle was waged with the West Windsor-Plainsboro Regional School District Board of Education to have the local high school ball field named after Bachner. In August 2009 shortly after Bachner's death Pete Weale proposed that the North baseball field be named in honor of David Bachner. At a celebration in May 2010 in honor of Bachner the phrase "Bachner Field #16" was spray painted on the varsity field fence tarp in protest for the School Board's refusal to name the field. On February 6, 2012 Bachner's coach, Bob Boyce, created a petition that was filled with 1500 signatures and delivered to the school board to try to convince board members to take action on naming the field. On October 2, 2012 the West Windsor-Plainsboro Regional School District Board of Education voted to adopt a facilities naming policy that required a five-year waiting period. In June 2014 Tim Hitchings wrote a letter to the WWP School Board of Education requesting that the High School North baseball field be named after David Bachner. Tim Hitchings's letter was in response to Pete Weale's letter of May 16, 2014.

On September 23, 2014 the West Windsor-Plainsboro Regional School District Board of Education voted to rename West Windsor-Plainsboro High School North Baseball Field as David J. Bachner Baseball Field. On April 25, 2015 a dedication ceremony was held with alumni from David's High School North Baseball Team. David Bachner's teammates unveiled a banner to "name" the field.
