= List of Princeton High School (New Jersey) alumni =

This list of alumni of Princeton High School in New Jersey includes graduates and non-graduate former students.

- George Barna (born 1955), author
- Chris Barron (born Christopher Barron Gross), lead singer of the Spin Doctors
- Stefi Baum (born 1958), astrophysicist
- Laurie Berkner (born 1969), children's musical artist
- Richard E. Besser (born 1959, class of 1977), ABC News medical editor
- Todd Blackledge (born 1961), quarterback who played in the NFL for the Kansas City Chiefs and the Pittsburgh Steelers
- Blues Traveler, members of band
- Lesley Bush (born 1947), two-time U.S. Olympic diver who won a gold medal in platform diving at the 1964 Summer Olympics
- Sim Cain (born 1963), drummer for the Rollins Band
- Michelle Charlesworth (born 1970), news anchor, WABC New York
- Damien Chazelle (born 1985), Academy Award-winning screenwriter and film director
- Richard J. Coffee (1925–2017), politician who served in the New Jersey Senate and as chairman of the New Jersey Democratic State Committee
- Rhys Coiro (born 1979), actor
- Kelly Curtis (born 1989, class of 2007), skeleton racer who competed at the 2022 Winter Olympics
- Mervin Field (1921–2015), public opinion pollster whose career in polling began with a poll of PHS students in a class election
- Evan Gershkovich (born 1991, class of 2010), journalist for The Wall Street Journal who was detained by Russia as a spy
- Ariela Gross (born 1965, class of 1983), historian; John B. and Alice R. Sharp Professor of Law and History at the University of Southern California Gould School of Law
- Chris Harford, self-taught singer, songwriter, guitarist and painter
- Brendan Hill (born 1970), drummer
- Brett Hoebel (born c. 1981, class of 1999), personal trainer best known for appearing as a trainer on the U.S. reality television show The Biggest Loser: Couples 4 in 2011
- Christine Moore Howell (1899–1972), hair care product businesswoman; first African-American to graduate from Princeton High School
- Emily Hunt (class of 1997), author, campaigner and former government adviser. Appointed an Officer of the Order of the British Empire in 2023.
- Arielle Jacobs (born 1983), Broadway actor
- Ben Jelen (born 1979), singer-songwriter
- Nick Kovalakides (born 1939/1940, class of 1957), javelin thrower
- Michael Lemonick, former senior science writer at Time magazine
- John Lithgow (born 1945), actor
- Tom Malinowski (born 1965, class of 1983), Assistant Secretary of State for Democracy, Human Rights, and Labor from 2014 to 2017 and congressman from New Jersey's 7th congressional district from 2019 to 2023
- Ann M. Martin (born 1955, class of 1973), author, best known for her The Baby-Sitters Club series of books
- Brad Mays (born 1955, class of 1973), filmmaker
- John McPhee (born 1931), The New Yorker staff writer, author and Pulitzer Prize winner
- Ben Navarro (born 1962/1963), businessman; founder and CEO of Beemok Capital
- Bebe Neuwirth (born 1958, class of 1976), actress
- John Popper (born 1967), musician
- Andy Potts (born 1976, class of 1995), triathlete who represented the United States in triathlon at the 2004 Summer Olympics
- Henry A. Rosso (1917–1999), leader in the formal development of the fundraising profession in the United States
- Dan Schulman (born 1958, class of 1976), business executive; president of PayPal
- Tsutomu Shimomura (born 1964), Japanese-American scientist and computer security expert
- Michael Showalter (born 1970, class of 1988), comedian, writer, and film director
- Joe Steinhardt (born 1984, class of 2002), record producer, author, and musician
- Robert Stone (born 1958, class of 1976), director and documentary filmmaker
- Ben Taub (born 1991), The New Yorker staff writer and Pulitzer Prize winner
- Saskia Webber (born 1971), soccer goalkeeper who played for the United States women's national soccer team as well as the New York Power and Philadelphia Charge in the Women's United Soccer Association
- Helmut-Ulrich Weiss (born 1947), filmmaker and educator
- Ilana B. Witten, neuroscientist and associate professor of Psychology and Neuroscience at Princeton University
