= Matt Lalli =

American lacrosse player (born 1986)

Matt Lalli (born March 27, 1986) is an American professional lacrosse player for the San Francisco Dragons of Major League Lacrosse.

Raised in the Princeton Junction section of West Windsor, New Jersey, Lalli attended West Windsor-Plainsboro High School North in Plainsboro Township, New Jersey, where he lettered in lacrosse, hockey, football, and soccer. He scored 51 goals and 30 assists as a senior, and was named a high school All American and Player of the Year by the Princeton Packet and the Trentonian.

Lalli played for the Colgate Raiders men's lacrosse team, where he scored 21 goals and 23 assists as a freshman to lead the team in scoring, and followed that with 26 goals and 18 assists as a sophomore. He scored 22 goals and 27 assists as a junior, the second-highest point total in the Patriot League. As a senior he scored 26 goals and 20 assists, leading to his selection as a 3rd team All American and his participation in the North–South All Star Game. Lalli led Colgate to its first-ever share of the Patriot League title in the 2006 season, and helped the team to a berth in the NCAA tournament.

He was selected in the 2nd Round of the 2008 Major League Lacrosse Draft as the 16th pick overall by the Dragons. He played in eight games for San Francisco, scoring 10 goals and five assists, including five goals scored in a June 14, 2008, game against the Denver Outlaws.
