= Princeton Junction =

Princeton Junction may refer to:

- Princeton Junction, New Jersey, a census-designated place and unincorporated community in Mercer County
  - Princeton Junction station, a rail station in the above community
