= Colonial Conference =

Colonial Conference may refer to:

- Colonial Conference (New Jersey), a New Jersey high school sports league
- Colonial Hills Conference, a New Jersey high school sports league
- Colonial States Athletic Conference, an NCAA Division III athletic conference
- Colonial Valley Conference, a New Jersey high school sports league
- Coastal Athletic Association – formerly known as the Colonial Athletic Association, an NCAA Division I athletic conference
- Imperial Conference (also called "Colonial Conference") meetings of heads of governments in the British Empire
