= Taktin Oey =

Taktin Oey (born 1986) is an American composer from the Princeton Junction section of West Windsor, New Jersey, United States.

He graduated from West Windsor-Plainsboro High School North in 2004. He graduated from Harvard University in 2008. He has received a range of awards including the 1999 and 1996 ASCAP (American Society of Composers, Authors & Publishers) and First Prize for his Piano Quartet in the European Region's Young Composers’ Competition in 2000.

Oey's Symphony #1 was given its world premiere in 1997 by the Princeton Chamber Symphony when he was 10 years old and was performed in 1998 by the Orchestra London in Ontario.
