= WWPH =

- Princeton Junction, New Jersey; United States
- Frequency: 107.9 MHz

Programming
- Format: Freeform

Ownership
- Owner: West Windsor-Plainsboro Regional School District

History
- First air date: 1975
- Call sign meaning: West Windsor-Plainsboro High

Technical information
- Licensing authority: FCC
- Facility ID: 71694
- Class: D
- ERP: 17 watts
- HAAT: 11 meters (36 feet)
- Transmitter coordinates: 40°18′20″N 74°37′16″W

Links
- Public license information: Public file; LMS
- Webcast: https://live365.com/station/WWPH-a73131
- Website: https://live365.com/station/WWPH-a73131

WWPH (107.9 FM) is a student-run non-commercial high-school radio station licensed to the community of Princeton Junction, New Jersey and serving Mercer County. The station is owned by West Windsor-Plainsboro Regional School District. It airs a Freeform radio format. Programming includes music, news, student views, community information, sports, and more. The station posts podcasts on Apple Podcasts, Youtube and many other podcasting apps. The station streams as WWPH on Live365.com (https://live365.com/station/WWPH-a73131)

The station was assigned the WWPH call letters by the Federal Communications Commission.
