= West Windsor-Plainsboro High School North =

High school in Middlesex County, New Jersey, US

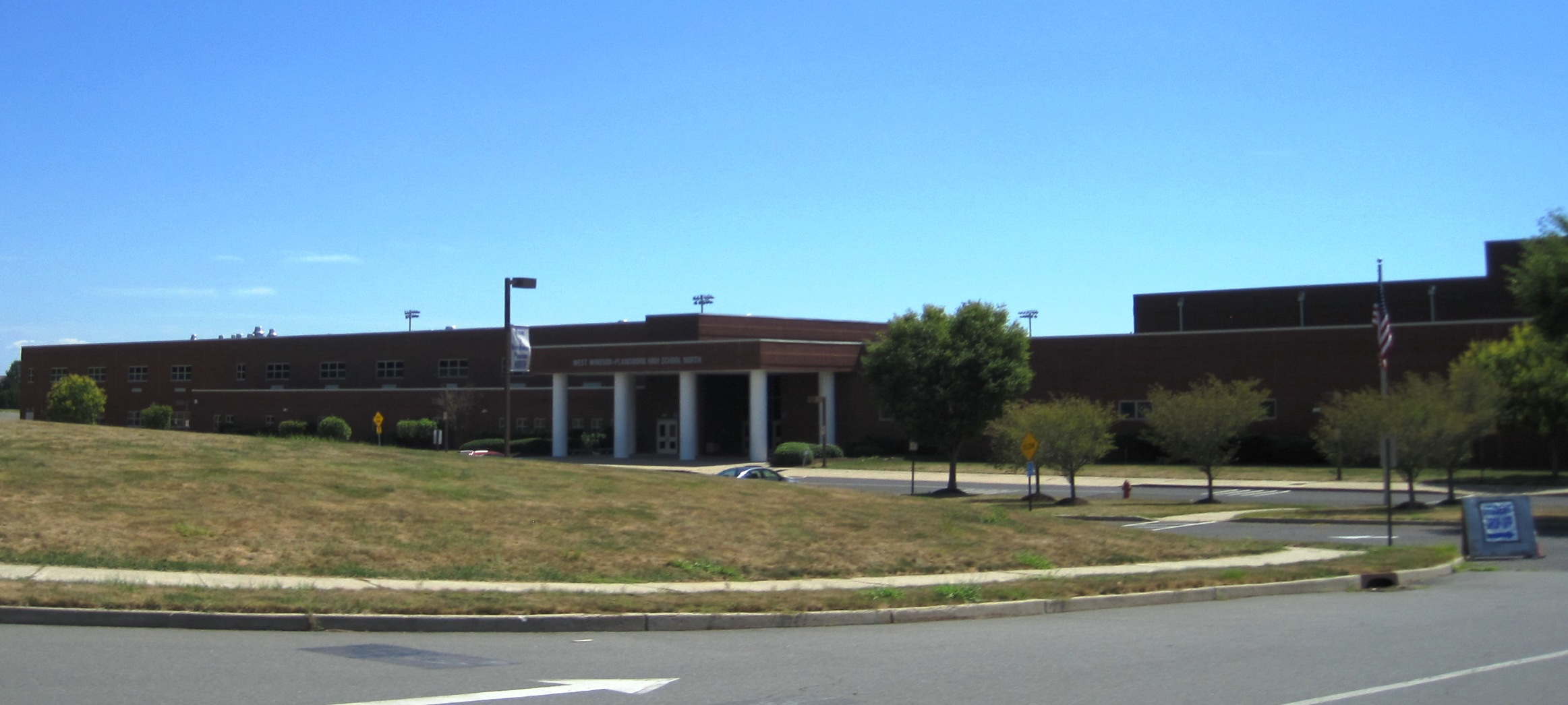
- Front of the school

Location
- 90 Grovers Mill Road; Plainsboro Township, Middlesex County, New Jersey 08536; United States; 40.3225°N 74.6006°W

Information
- Type: Public high school
- Established: 1997
- School district: West Windsor-Plainsboro Regional School District
- NCES School ID: 341770000191
- Principal: Lamont Thomas
- Faculty: 118.9 FTEs
- Grades: 9-12
- Enrollment: 1,499 (as of 2023–24)
- Student to teacher ratio: 12.6:1
- Campus: Suburban
- Colors: Royal Blue and Silver
- Athletics conference: Colonial Valley Conference (general)
- Team name: Knights
- Newspaper: The Knightly News
- Yearbook: Excalibur
- Website: www.west-windsor-plainsboro.k12.nj.us/schools/high_school_north

West Windsor-Plainsboro High School North (also known as WW-P North or North) is a four-year public comprehensive high school located in Plainsboro Township in Middlesex County, in the U.S. state of New Jersey. The school serves students in ninth through twelfth grades. The school joins West Windsor-Plainsboro High School South as the two secondary schools of the West Windsor-Plainsboro Regional School District, a school district serving students from West Windsor (in Mercer County) and Plainsboro Township (in Middlesex County).

As of the 2023–24 school year, the school had an enrollment of 1,499 students and 118.9 classroom teachers (on an FTE basis), for a student–teacher ratio of 12.6:1. There were 53 students (3.5% of enrollment) eligible for free lunch and 13 (0.9% of students) eligible for reduced-cost lunch.

West Windsor-Plainsboro High School North opened in September 1997. An addition was added in 2000. The first class to graduate was the Class of 2002. The facility covers 240,000 square feet (22,000 m^{2}) and contains all core facilities. The school is located on an 80-acre (320,000 m^{2}) tract on Grovers Mill Road in Plainsboro, across from Community Middle School and the Millstone River Upper Elementary School.

The school mascot is the Northern Knight, and the school colors are Royal Blue and Silver. The mascot was chosen as voted on by the original three graduating classes, the Classes of 2002, 2003, and 2004.

== History ==
The original building, constructed on a 90-acre (36 ha) site at a cost of $30 million (equivalent to $60.2 million in 2025), opened in September 1997 as the district's second high school facility, with an inaugural class of 525 students in ninth grade. An additional $13 million was allocated to expand the building to accommodate 1,750 students in grades 9-12.

== Awards, recognition and rankings ==
During the 2006–07 school year, West Windsor-Plainsboro High School North was recognized with the Blue Ribbon School Award of Excellence by the United States Department of Education, the highest award an American school can receive.

The school was the 23rd-ranked public high school in New Jersey out of 339 schools statewide in New Jersey Monthly magazine's September 2014 cover story on the state's "Top Public High Schools", using a new ranking methodology. The school had been ranked 32nd in the state of 328 schools in 2012, after being ranked 29th in 2010 out of 322 schools listed. The magazine ranked the school 19th in 2008 out of 316 schools.

Schooldigger.com ranked the school tied for 69th out of 381 public high schools statewide in its 2011 rankings (a decrease of 8 positions from the 2010 ranking) which were based on the combined percentage of students classified as proficient or above proficient on the mathematics (92.9%) and language arts literacy (97.3%) components of the High School Proficiency Assessment (HSPA).

In the 2011 "Ranking America's High Schools" issue by The Washington Post, the school was ranked 18th in New Jersey and 708th nationwide.

In its 2013 report on "America's Best High Schools", The Daily Beast ranked the school 183rd in the nation among participating public high schools and 12th overall (sixth of non-magnet schools) in New Jersey. The school was ranked 197th in the nation and 15th in New Jersey on the list of "America's Best High Schools 2012" prepared by The Daily Beast / Newsweek, with rankings based primarily on graduation rate, matriculation rate for college and number of Advanced Placement / International Baccalaureate courses taken per student, with lesser factors based on average scores on the SAT / ACT, average AP/IB scores and the number of AP/IB courses available to students.

The school's student-run radio station is WWPH 107.9 FM, based in Princeton Junction.

=== Debate League ===
Since the school's opening in 1999, West Windsor-Plainsboro High School North's Debate League is a top competitor in regional debate tournaments and competitions, including Princeton Moot Court, New Jersey Mock Trial, and the Colonial Valley Conference. In the 2016–17 school year, High School North's Mock Trial was ranked second in Middlesex County, ending the season with a 3–1 record. They also ranked first place in the CVC Policy Debate division. Prior in 2011, High School North also won the Spring Moot Court tournament at Princeton University and since then has had its members regularly rank among the top competitors.

=== Fed Challenge ===
North's Fed Challenge team was the New York Federal Reserve District Champion in 2007, 2010, and 2014. In 2015, 2016 and 2017 the team advanced to the Finals and placed 2nd.

=== Science Olympiad ===
North advanced to the Science Olympiad national tournament after winning the New Jersey state competition 5 times, in 2008, 2015, 2016, 2018 and 2023 and placed 9th, 16th, 11th, 8th and 15th respectively. They also went to nationals in 2024 after New Jersey received a 2nd bid for the national competition. North also qualified for the 2020 national tournament, which was cancelled due to the COVID-19 pandemic.

== Distinguished teachers ==
In 2009, Timothy Cornell was selected as a winner of the 2009 Edyth May Sliffe Award for distinguished high school mathematics teaching, presented by the Mathematical Association of America, one of 22 teachers throughout high schools in the United States and Canada to be selected for the award.

== Athletics ==
The West Windsor-Plainsboro High School North Knights participate in the Colonial Valley Conference, which is comprised of public and private high schools in Mercer, Middlesex and Monmouth counties, and operates under the supervision of the New Jersey State Interscholastic Athletic Association. With 1,084 students in grades 10 to 12, the school was classified by the NJSIAA for the 2022-23 school year as South, Group 4 for most athletic competition purposes, which included schools with an enrollment of 1,060 to 5,049 students in that grade range. The co-op football team competes in the Capitol Division of the 94-team West Jersey Football League superconference After suspending its football program, the district received approval from the NJSIAA to establish a co-operative North / South football team starting in the 2018-19 school year that was classified by the NJSIAA as Group V South for football for 2024–2026, which included schools with 1,333 to 2,324 students.

The school participates in joint cooperative ice hockey and football teams with West Windsor-Plainsboro High School South as the host school / lead agency. These co-op programs operate under agreements scheduled to expire at the end of the 2023–24 school year.

With a decline in the number of student athletes playing football at WW-P South that would be inadequate for the school to field a team of its own, the district attempted to combine the teams from the two schools to have them operate as a single co-operative football team for the 2017–18 school year based at South HS. Given that the size of the schools is larger than the threshold established by the state for co-op programs (North is classified as Group III and South as Group IV, based on the size of the enrollment of each school), the proposal was rejected by the West Jersey Football League and by the Leagues and Conferences Committee of the New Jersey State Interscholastic Athletic Association, before an appeal of the decision was rejected by the Commissioner of the New Jersey Department of Education. In August 2017, the district announced that WW-P North would cancel its program. The members of the canceled program will be eligible to play for the North junior varsity football team, but will not be able to play for the South team. The West Windsor- Plainsboro High School South team and West Windsor Plainsboro High School North team merged for the 2018 season to create the WW-P football team. This combined football team was able to field a varsity, junior varsity and freshmen team for the 2018 and 2019 season.

In 2007, the boys' soccer team won the Central Jersey Group III state championship with a 3-0 win over Red Bank Regional High School in the tournament final. The boys soccer team, under the direction of coach Trevor Warner, repeated as Central Jersey Group III Champions when they beat Wall Township in the sectional final, finishing the season with a 19-2 record, the best in school history. In 2008, they defeated Wall High School by a score of 2-1, becoming the first team from the Colonial Valley Conference to win back-to-back sectional finals.

In 2008, the Ultimate Frisbee club team (a sport not officially recognized by the school) finished 2nd in the UPA NJ High School state championships while also winning the Spirit Award for best sportsmanship. In 2012, the team placed 2nd again.

The boys track team won the indoor relay championship in Group III in 2009 (as co-champion) and 2020. The girls team was co-champion in 2012.

The girls fencing team was the sabre team champion in 2014. That same year, the team won the District II championship and the Santelli Tournament.

The boys track team won the Group III spring / outdoor track state championship in 2017.

=== Boys cross country ===
The North boys' cross country team is led by coach Brian Gould. The team won the Group III state championship in the four consecutive years from 2007 to 2010.

In 2007, the Knights won the CVC Championship, Mercer County Championship, Central Jersey Group III Championship, Group III state championship, and finished 5th at the New Jersey Meet of Champions.

In 2008, the Knights came through with the then-greatest cross-country season in state history. The North harriers took 1st at the Shore Coaches Invite, posting the fastest team average of the day; finished 5th at the Manhattan Eastern States Championship; won the CVC championship; won their second straight Mercer County championship; won their 2nd straight Central Jersey Group III Championship; a 2nd straight Group III state championship; the team's first-ever Meet of Champions title, over Don Bosco Preparatory High School team, and set a Holmdel Park course record average; the team's first-ever NXN Northeast Regional championship. That win propelled them to a berth in the Nike Cross-Country National Championships (NXN), where they finished 5th, which was the best a New Jersey team had ever done until that time.

In 2009, the team followed up the successful 2008 campaign, and the graduation of four top runners, by finishing 3rd in the New Jersey Meet of Champions and 4th at Nike Nationals Northeast. Preceding these championship races, the team finished 1st at Manhattan College Invitational, 3rd at Shore Coaches Invitational, 1st at Briarwood Invitational and finished the season undefeated once again (14–0). The Knights also took their 3rd straight CVC, Mercer County, Central Jersey Group III, and Group III state championships. The team had won 55 consecutive dual meets.

In 2010, the boys cross-country team finished 3rd at Shore Coaches (Championship Race); 9th at Eastern States Championship; won its 4th consecutive NJSIAA Central Jersey Group III Sectional Championship; won its 4th straight NJSIAA Group 3 Championship; 5th place at the New Jersey Meet of Champions; and 4th place at the Nike Cross Northeast Regional team. WW-P North became just the 5th program in state history to finish top-5 at the Meet of Champions four years in a row (Haddonfield, Christian Brothers Academy, Don Bosco, and Westfield were the other teams).

The team is now really good again.

== Administration ==
The school's principal is Lamont Thomas. His administration team includes two assistant principals.

== Notable alumni ==
- David Jordan Bachner (1991–2009), co-captain of the West Windsor-Plainsboro High School North baseball team whose sudden death led to the creation of a charitable foundation in his name.
- Andrew Bynum (born 1987), basketball player for the Los Angeles Lakers and Cleveland Cavaliers, who attended the school during his freshman year.
- Matt Lalli (born 1986), professional lacrosse player for the San Francisco Dragons.
- Mariam Nazarian (born 1983), concert pianist and producer, who made her Carnegie Hall debut at the age of 16.
- Taktin Oey (born 1986), composer.
- Dharun Ravi (born 1992), Rutgers student who was tried and convicted in 2012 of invasion of privacy, hindering apprehension, witness tampering, and bias intimidation in the Tyler Clementi case.
- Rebecca Soni (born 1987), won a gold medal in 200m breaststroke and a silver medal in the 100m breaststroke at the 2008 Summer Olympics in Beijing.

== See also ==
- West Windsor-Plainsboro High School South
- List of high schools in New Jersey
