= Princeton High School (New Jersey) =

High school in Mercer County, New Jersey, US

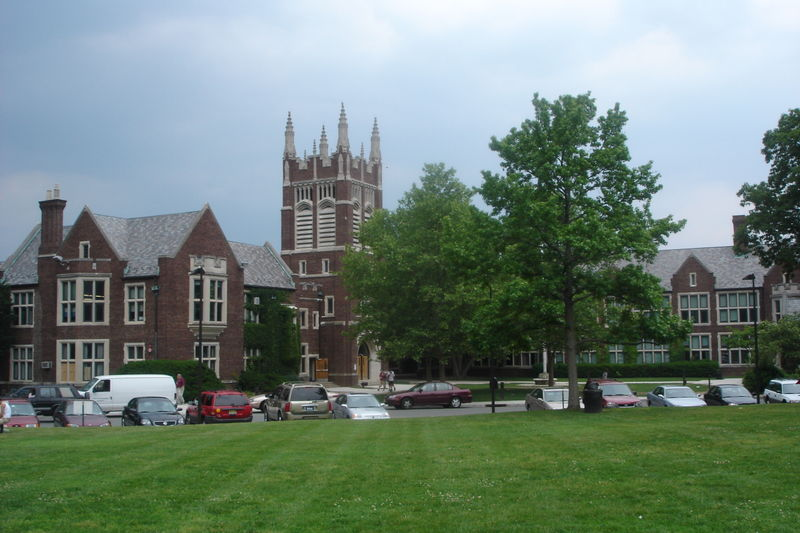
- Tower and courtyard at entrance of the school

Location
- 151 Moore Street; Princeton, Mercer County, New Jersey 08540; United States; 40.357027°N 74.656917°W

Information
- Type: Public high school
- Motto: Live to Learn, Learn to Live
- Established: 1898
- NCES School ID: 341341003182
- Principal: Cecilia Birge
- Faculty: 130.2 FTEs
- Enrollment: 1,532 (as of 2023–24)
- Student to teacher ratio: 11.8:1
- Colors: Blue and white
- Athletics conference: Colonial Valley Conference (general); West Jersey Football League (football)
- Team name: Little Tigers
- Accreditation: Middle States Association of Colleges and Schools
- Newspaper: The Tower
- Yearbook: The Prince
- Website: phs.princetonk12.org

Princeton High School (PHS) is a four-year comprehensive public high school in Princeton, New Jersey, operating as part of the Princeton Public Schools district. Students from Cranbury Township attend PHS as part of a sending/receiving relationship with the Cranbury School District. The school has been accredited by the Middle States Association of Colleges and Schools Commission on Elementary and Secondary Schools since 1932 and is accredited through January 2026.

As of the 2023–24 school year, the school had an enrollment of 1,532 students and 130.2 classroom teachers (on an FTE basis), for a student–teacher ratio of 11.8:1. There were 123 students (8.0% of enrollment) eligible for free lunch and 32 (2.1% of students) eligible for reduced-cost lunch.

== Overview ==
This image of PHS from above (with old municipal boundaries pre-dating the January 1, 2013, consolidation of Princeton highlighted) predates the 2000s construction. The building complex to the right of the athletic fields and track is Princeton Middle School, also pre-construction.

Princeton High School is located between Moore Street and Walnut Lane. Princeton Middle School is located across from the high school athletic fields on Walnut Lane.

The school offers 200 courses in many subjects and levels, including most of the courses in the Advanced Placement Program. More than 70% of students take at least one AP or accelerated course. Additionally, the High School Program at Princeton University permits qualified juniors and seniors to take free courses at Princeton University if they have exhausted all high school course alternatives within a discipline, receiving only high school credit for any university courses successfully completed.

The school contains over 250 classrooms, several equipped science labs, two gymnasia, a performing arts center, a fitness center, a garden, athletic turf and tennis courts. Some of this came from significant reconstruction from 2003 to 2007 as part of an $86 million project to renovate the district's school buildings, also including a new mathematics wing and renovated library.

== History ==
=== Nassau Street campus (1898–1929) ===
Princeton High School started in 1898 as a branch of the Princeton Model School on Nassau Street, with an initial class of only four 9th grade students. Enrollment increased to eighty students by 1912, but only 40% successfully completed the school curriculum that year.

In 1916, Princeton High School admitted its first Black student, and integrated enrollment increased in the 1920s. Black students had previously attended school in Trenton or the Manual Training and Industrial School in Bordentown. Black students, however, were automatically placed in the non-honors General Program, and were awarded “certificates of completion” instead of official high school diplomas.

By the 1920s, the school's curriculum included Latin, French, "household," and fine arts in addition to core subjects such as mathematics, history, English, physical education, and science. In 1911, Princeton High School's first school newspaper, P.H.S. Observer, was established, later changing its to the Blue and White upon the adoption of the school colors in 1921. Rising interest in student sports led to the growth of basketball, tennis, football, baseball, track, field sports, and hockey teams for both boys and girls. By 1927, a student council had drafted its first constitution.

=== Moore Street campus (1929–present) ===
As the original school building in Princeton was pushed beyond capacity due to increasing junior high enrollment, plans were made to begin work on a new "Junior and Seniors High School" building at 151 Moore Street. Architect Ernest Sibley, a New Jersey architect and school specialist, was hired to design a state-of-the-art facility. Princeton residents debated whether the school should be built in the Collegiate Gothic style favored by Princeton University or the more Colonial style of downtown Princeton. Voters eventually favored the former, a style visible in the school's arched entrances and prominent tower.

In 1926, 7 acres off Moore Street were bought, and the cornerstone of the school was laid in 1928. The new building opened its doors to 578 students in September 1929, with an opening ceremony, featuring a speech from the United States Commissioner of Education and the presentation of a commemorative flag by the original graduating class of 1898, following in November.

Prior to the opening of West Windsor-Plainsboro High School in September 1973, students from West Windsor and Plainsboro Township had attended Princeton High School as part of sending/receiving relationships. The school initially served 700 students in grades 7 to 10, while the remaining students in grades 11 and 12 finished their schooling at Princeton High School through their graduation

== Awards, recognition, and rankings ==
Nationally, Niche ranked Princeton High School as the 47th best public high school in America in its "2021 Best Public High Schools in America" rankings and gave it an "A+" Overall Niche Grade. PHS ranked in Newsweek's top high school list in 2004 (113), 2005 (212), 2006 (113), 2007 (208), 2008 (142), and 2009 (210). In U.S. News & World Report, PHS was ranked in 2009 (94), 2010 (113), and 2014 (216). In The Washington Post's "Most Challenging High Schools" list, PHS ranked in 2011 (370), 2012 (330), 2013 (322), and 2014 (467).

In 2007, The Wall Street Journal, ranking the country's high schools based on a percentage of 2007 high school seniors sent to eight selective colleges (Harvard, Princeton, MIT, Pomona, University of Chicago, Johns Hopkins, Swarthmore, and Williams), placed PHS at #27. PHS was the second-highest ranked publicly funded school, with a total of 31 students matriculating to those schools.

Statewide, New Jersey Monthly's "Top Public High Schools" has ranked PHS in 2006 (13), 2008 (6), 2010 (44), 2012 (59), 2014 (67), 2016 (15), and 2018 (20). Schooldigger ranked the school in 2011 (75), 2013 (50), and 2014 (44). In 2009, USNWR ranked PHS as the highest ranked open-enrollment high school in New Jersey. In 2019, USNWR ranked PHS as the second-best open-enrollment public high school in the state and the twelfth-best high school in the state overall.

== School policy ==
=== Schedule ===
School is held Monday through Friday from 8:20 a.m.–3:21 p.m. for 180 days per year. The daily schedule consists of eight academic periods (44 minutes), though 2 block-day periods with classes of 82 minutes are held on Tuesday and Wednesday. There are four minutes between each class period for the students to get to their next class.

Before the 2018–2019 school year, on every Wednesday, (termed "short Wednesdays" or "one-forty-nine days") and on days when special events are planned, the school day was shortened and ended at 1:49 p.m. Students attended 35 minute class periods, and homeroom and break periods are not shortened. Short Wednesdays existed to permit the operation of the mandatory freshmen Peer Group program between 1:49 and 2:51. This period of time was also used for community service group meetings for sophomores, other extracurricular activities, and school-wide events such as pep rallies, the Fall Festival, and Spring Fling. For the 2020-2021 school year, due to the COVID-19 pandemic, the school temporarily switched to a hybrid program, where students are split into cohorts "A" and "B", with each going to school for alternating weeks, while another cohort, "Cohort C", continues remote learning.

=== Graduation requirements ===
In order to receive a diploma from Princeton High School, students must successfully complete a minimum of 120 credits from grade 9 to grade 12. Additionally, each student must have completed 50 hours of community service.

In addition, students must show proficiency in the PARCC assessment. Previously, the school used the HSPA 11 - the class of 2015 is the last class to rely on this. Students must also pass the Biology State Assessment the year they are enrolled in a Biology course.

PHS has a policy of revoking credit for a student's course if a certain amount of absences in a class are reached. More than 18 absences from a year-long course or 9 absences for a semester course will lead to credit revocation. Tardiness counts as one-third of an absence for the purposes of revoking credit.

== Extracurricular activities ==
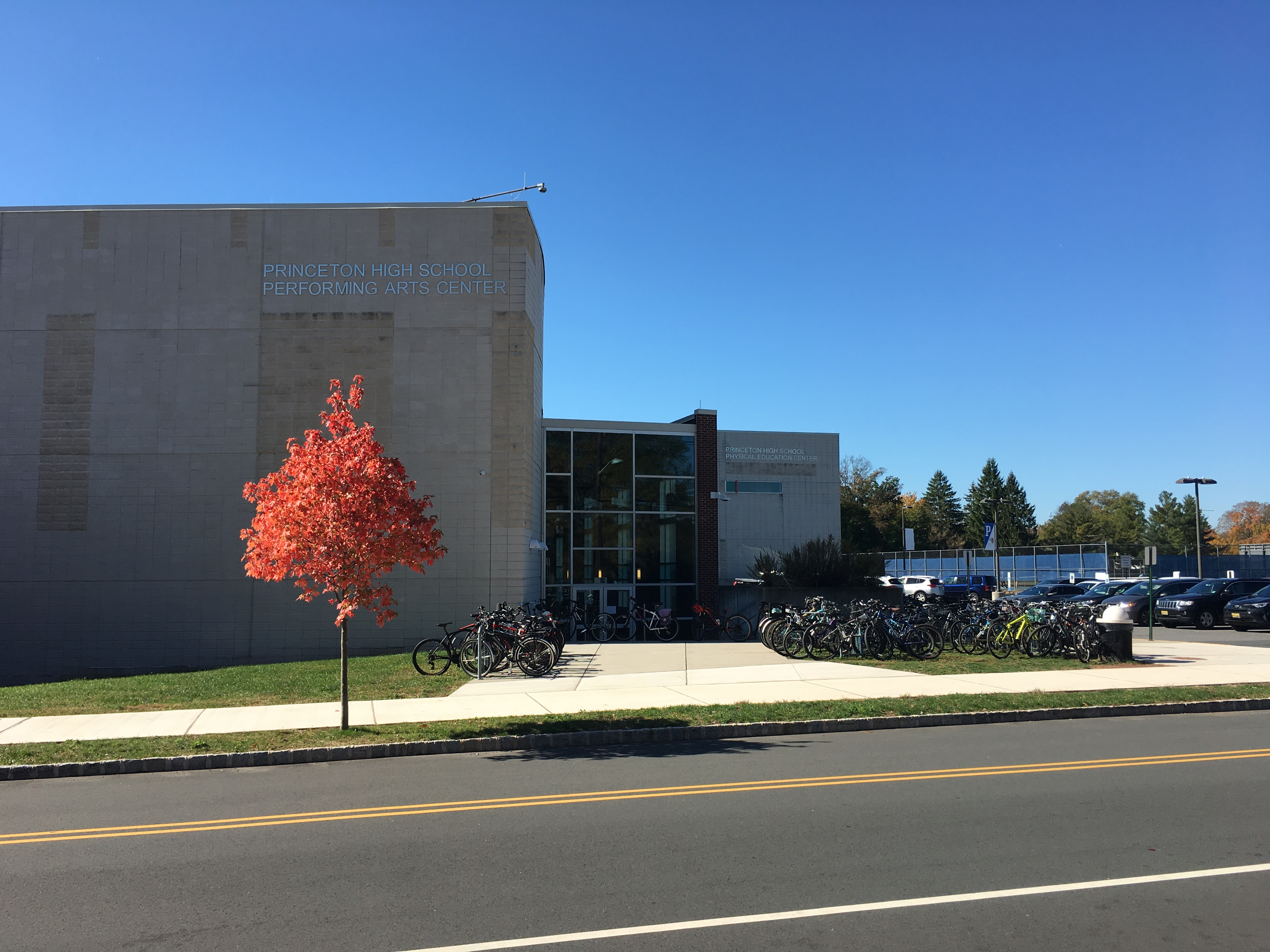
The Performing Arts Center and Physical Education Center structures at the rear of Princeton High School

=== Athletics ===
The Princeton High School Tigers participate in the Colonial Valley Conference, which is composed of public and private high schools in Mercer, Middlesex, and Monmouth counties, operating under the supervision of the New Jersey State Interscholastic Athletic Association (NJSIAA). With 1,190 students in grades 10-12, the school was classified by the NJSIAA for the 2019–20 school year as Group IV for most athletic competition purposes, which included schools with an enrollment of 1,060 to 5,049 students in that grade range. The football team competes in the Classic Division of the 94-team West Jersey Football League superconference and was classified by the NJSIAA as Group IV South for football for 2024–2026, which included schools with 890 to 1,298 students. Princeton High School fields interscholastic teams in baseball, basketball, cheerleading, cross country, fencing, field hockey, football, golf, ice hockey, lacrosse, soccer, softball, spring track and field, swimming, tennis, volleyball, winter track, and wrestling.

The boys' cross country running team won the Public Group B state championship in 1928, won in Group II in 1974, won the Group III title in 1986, and won in Group IV in 2016.

The boys' basketball team won the Group III state championship in 1931 (defeating runner-up James Caldwell High School in the final game of the tournament) and the Group II title in 1937 (vs. Bogota High School) and 1938 (vs. Atlantic Highlands High School). The 1931 team won the Class B state title (since recategorized as Group III) with a 20-16 win against James Caldwell in the tournament final.

The boys' track team won the Group II spring / outdoor track state championship in 1938 and 1981, won the Group III title in 1952-1956, and won in Group IV in 1966 and 2018. The program's 10 state titles are tied for eighth-most in the state.

The field hockey team won the Central Jersey sectional championships in 1971 and 1973, won the Central Jersey Group II title in 1975, 1978, and 1982, and won the Central Jersey Group III title in 1984; the team was the Group II state champions in 1975 (vs. Montville High School) and won the Group III championship in 1984 (vs. Northern Valley Regional High School at Demarest). The 1973 team won the Group II title with a 2–0 victory against Montville in the championship game.

The boys' tennis team won the Group III state championship in 1972 (vs. Millburn High School), 1984 (vs. Ramapo High School), 1986 (vs. Tenafly High School), 1987 (vs. Tenafly), and 2002 (vs. Tenafly), the Group I / II title in 1976 (vs. Ocean City High School), and won the Group II title in 1977 (vs. West Orange High School), 1979 and 1980. The team was the public school state champion in 1984. The 1980 team won the Group II title, defeating Tenafly 5–0 in the tournament final.

The boys' track team won the indoor track Group II state championship in 1981 and 1982. The girls' team won the Group II title in 1989, 1992 (as co-champion).

The girls' lacrosse team won the overall state championship in 1985, defeating Moorestown High School in the tournament final.

The girls' swimming team won the Public Division B state championship in 1993. The boys' team won the Public B state title in 2012.

The boys' soccer team won the Group III state championship in 1995 (against Arthur L. Johnson High School in the finals of the playoffs), 2009 (vs. Millburn High School) and 2012 (as co-champion with Ramapo High School). In 2009, the boys' soccer team won the Group III state championship, capping off an undefeated season with a 2–1 win over Millburn High School in the final game of the state tournament. In 2023, the team won the program's first state title in Group IV after defeating Kearny High School by a score of 3-2 in the finals.

The golf team won all five of its 2007 tournaments, including the Group III state championships, the Mercer County Tournament, Sectional Championships, the Bunker Hill Tournament, and the Cherry Valley Tournament. The team over had a record of 47-2 during the 2007 and 2008 seasons. The 2008 team repeated as Group III champion.

The varsity girls' swim team won the 2007 NJSIAA Central - B state sectional championship with an 87–83 win over Ocean Township High School. They again beat Ocean Township High School in 2008 for the second year in a row, claiming their 6th consecutive NJSIAA Central - B sectional championship.

The 2009 boys' swimming team won the Central Jersey Group B Sectional title with a 99–71 win against Ocean Township High School. In 2011, the boys' swimming team won the Central Jersey Group B Sectional title with a 102–68 win against Freehold Borough High School. Following that, the team advanced to the NJSIAA Public B finals, ultimately losing to Scotch Plains-Fanwood High School, 80–90. In 2012, the boys' swimming team again won the Central Jersey Group B Sectional title. After that, Princeton once again faced off against their rivals last year Scotch Plains-Fanwood. This time the Princeton boys' swimming team won 109–61, giving them the NJSIAA Public B state champion title.

In 2008, the varsity cheerleading squad competed in the Colonial Valley Conference Competition, and won Best Dance, first place in Medium Division and Overall Grand Champions. They competed against 13 other teams in order to win the Grand Champion Award. In 2010, the squad competed again and won first place in Small Division.

The Ultimate team, known as PHUC (Princeton High Ultimate Club), competes in the annual New Jersey High School Boys State Championship and won 2014 D1 7th (tied) place, 2016 D2 7th place, 2017 D2 4th (overall 12th) place, and 2018 D1 11th (tied) place.

Starting with the 2026/2027 , Princeton Public Schools is instituting an activity fee. To offset the a structural financial deficit.

=== A cappella ===
PHS has four student-run a cappella groups. There are two "choir affiliated" groups (members must be part of the main choir): The Cat's Meow and Around 8, with two "choir unaffiliated" groups: Testostertones and Cloud Nine. All four perform at various events in and out of school, such as Back To School Night, Fall Festival, Friday Night Live (FNL), Winter Arch Sing WWP-South's Acappellooza, Spring Fling, and Final Arch Sing. All sing songs arranged by current and former members and produce an album yearly. The a cappella groups hold auditions at the end of each school year and admit a small number of new members.

Members of the choir-affiliated groups must also be members of the Princeton High School Choir. The Cat's Meow is all girls, established in the early 1980s and features five "classic" songs along with 15-20 new arrangements on their CD. Around Eight was formed 1992, originally a mainly madrigal-oriented group, but became more pop-oriented with complex beatboxing. The name came from the original eight members being slightly late or early to their 8 pm rehearsals.

Two additional groups were founded in the early 2000s to feature singers outside of the school's formal choral program, including those involved in the Princeton High School Jazz Band, musical theater, and external vocal activities. Cloud Nine is all-female and sings across genres, often featuring new arrangements and occasionally original music that is released on a studio album each spring. The group often draws members from the jazz and theater communities, though choir members are also eligible to audition. The Testostertones is the school's only all-male group, and is the most recent group formed.

=== History Bowl and Quiz Bowl ===
Princeton High School has a nationally competitive history bowl and quiz bowl team. It placed third in the state at NAQT's Garden Cup tournament in 2022.

=== Model United Nations ===
PHS MUN is the high school's Model United Nations team which competes at local and national conferences. The team is regularly ranked among the best high school teams in the country, competing most often in the New York / New Jersey region. The team typically attends 4 to 5 conferences a year, always including Princeton University's PMUNC conference, the first for new members, and Columbia University's CMUNCE conference, where members must try out to attend.

From 2007 to 2015 the team won the "Best Small Delegation" award at the CMUNCE conference every year. In 2016 PHS MUN broke the streak receiving the second place award of "Outstanding Small Delegation".

=== PHS Choir ===
PHS Choir is an elective as a regularly scheduled course for which credits and grades are earned.

Founded in 1944, the Choir is nationally and internationally known as one of the top high school choirs in the world. It is comprised of 60 to 80 students in grades 10 through 12 every year, with auditions conducted at the end of each academic year for entry in the following year. The Choir tours internationally (and occasionally nationally) once every two years. Past tours of special significance include the 1977/78 invitation from the American composer Gian Carlo Menotti to participate in Spoleto, a world-renowned summer festival where they premiered Menotti's opera, "The Egg" and an invitation to perform at the 850th anniversary of the city of Moscow. More recent destinations include Austria, Canada, China, the Czech Republic, France, Hungary, Italy, Sweden, the United Kingdom, Latvia, Estonia, and soon to be Southern Spain. In February–March 2001, the choir toured Saint Petersburg, Russia, Novgorod, Russia, and Berlin, Germany, culminating in a performance of Bach's Saint Matthew Passion in the world-famous Schauspielhaus in Berlin, accompanied by a top-ranked violinist from Germany. A national tour with the entire Choir to Washington D.C. in the spring of 2009 included a performance at the Washington National Cathedral. The Choir toured Barcelona, Spain, in February 2011, appearing on national Spanish television as well as gaining special permission to perform in the Cathedral of Montserrat. Since December 1944, the Choir has performed its annual winter concert in the Princeton University Chapel, often filled to capacity with over 1,200 attendees, including numerous Choir alumni. The Chamber Choir, which includes members of the main choir, has performed at the White House on numerous occasions.

The Choir has been under five directors: Harvey Woodruff from 1944 to 1948, Thomas Hilbish from 1948 to 1965, William Trego from 1965 to 1993, Charles "Sunny" Sundquist from 1993 to 2008, Vincent Metallo from 2008 to present.

=== PHS Food Aid ===
PHS Food Aid aims to spread consciousness about hunger in the Princeton community and support local food pantries. Their community service activities center around awareness campaigns, fundraising efforts, and purchasing foodstuffs in bulk for donations. PHS Food Aid's initiatives to promote volunteerism have been featured in the Princeton Community Works Conference and the National Service Learning Conference.

=== PHS Studio Band ===
The band program is an elective that can be taken as a regularly scheduled course for which credits and grades are earned. The band, an elite high school performance group, was the inspiration for the 2014 film Whiplash.

==== Program ====
Princeton High School has several levels of bands to accommodate all levels of playing from beginner to professional skill. Tiger I & II, Nassau I & II, Jazz Ensemble, and Studio Band are the 6 bands by order of playing ability. Students are assigned to their respective band level according to skill, regardless of seniority.

The Princeton High School Studio Band, directed by Joe Bongiovi, selects its members by audition only. All Studio Band members are expected to excel in sight-reading, master finger positions, and be familiar with all techniques that apply to their instrument. They are also expected to attend all rehearsals both during and after school. During the band's preparation for competition, ensemble rehearsal can be over 12–20 hours in 1 week.

The Studio Band is known to play a wide variety of genres arranged for Big Band. About one Friday evening each month throughout the school year the Studio Band hosts dances known as Big Band Dances.

==== History ====
The original director and founder of the Studio Band was Anthony Biancosino, who was the director of the Studio Band for 26 years. During those years the Studio Band had many successes, including playing at the inaugural balls of both Ronald Reagan and George H. W. Bush. The film Whiplash is based on writer/director Damien Chazelle's experiences in the band program under Biancosino.

==== Jazz Festival ====
The Princeton High School band program also hosts an annual Jazz Festival, nicknamed "Jazz Fest", at which local high school and middle school jazz bands are invited to perform for adjudication. Like many other similar high school jazz festivals, the host band traditionally plays last and is not scored for competition. Each year, the band program invites a guest artist to perform after the festival for its attendees.

=== PHS Tiger News ===
Tiger News is the school's video-based news source. Its Facebook page reads "Princeton High School's Tiger News meets once a week to film the show, which is broadcast during homeroom every week. With on-scene reports and special segments, Tiger News has quickly become a school hit!" The program was founded in 2013, and has continued ever since.

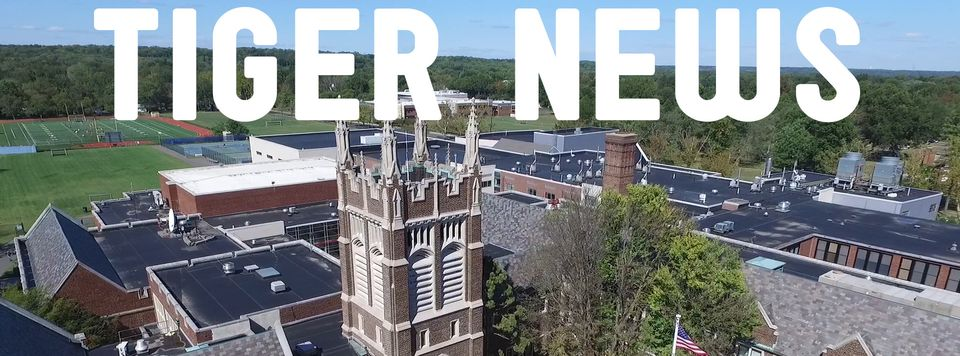
Logo for Princeton High School's Tiger News program

=== Spectacle Theatre ===
Spectacle Theatre is Princeton High School's student-run drama club. Each year, students will act in and produce a fall play (generally in November) and a spring musical (generally in March). After the conclusion of the musical, seniors have the opportunity to direct single-act plays in a Student Directed Play production. Each production involves tech, make-up, lighting, and costume departments as well as a stage crew.

The program was the first high school to premiere Brigadoon and Carousel. They have also performed operas at Princeton High School, the first of which was Cavalleria Rusticana, a one-act opera written by Pietro Mascagni.

Spectacle Theatre is currently directed by Pat Wray, the PHS drama teacher and former Broadway dancer and actress.

=== Speech and Debate ===
Princeton High School has a rich history of success both in the National Speech and Debate Association (NSDA) and the National Catholic Forensic League (NCFL). The school speech & debate team competes in the three largest forms of High School Debate: Public Forum, Lincoln Douglas, and Congressional Debate, as well as a smaller range of speech categories. Debaters in both Public Forum and Lincoln Douglas have qualified to the Tournament of Champions, the NSDA National Tournament, and the NCFL National Tournament.

=== Spork ===
Spork is the school's food and dining magazine. It was created during the 2011–12 school year through funds generating via Kickstarter. The Spork staff writes and adapts recipes, reviews local restaurants, and publishes food-related features and articles. The magazine is printed and distributed for free in school, in addition to online publication.

=== The Ideas Center ===
The Princeton High School Ideas Center provides most of the students in need at the school with peer tutors. Tutors work with their fellow students in one-on-one sessions or study groups. Tutoring is often done as a community service requirement, though this is not always the case.

=== The Ivy ===
The Ivy is the school's visual and literary arts magazine. Its title comes from the ivy that grows on some of the older school buildings. Student-submitted work is reviewed anonymously, and the staff creates the magazine based on these votes. The magazine is printed and distributed for free in school, in addition to online publication.

=== The Tower ===
The Tower is the school's newspaper, which was founded in 1911 as The Observer. In 1925, it was again renamed to The Blue & White, and received its present title in 1929 to commemorate the new high school building, which is presently the oldest building on campus. The first incarnation was published fortnightly in a smaller format, while the current edition is published monthly in a traditional newspaper size. It has been printed and typesetted by various local publishers, including the Town Topics and most recently the Princeton Packet. The newspaper is distributed for free in school, in addition to online publication.

The Tower has varied enormously in content and style throughout its publication. The nameplate has changed significantly, with the original pencil drawing of the tower with The New York Times-style lettering continually removed and reinserted in between redesigns, but the current masthead dates to the eighties. Features in The Tower include a monthly quotes section, "Cheers and Jeers" of various cultural and school-specific events, a two-page topical opinions/forum spread called Vanguard, and a monthly calendar of local events called "Pencil These In". Many of these topics have been resurrected from past issue of The Tower. General topics include opinion pieces, arts and entertainment, and sports news. Once a year a joke issue is published, which is a tradition first created in a 1920s issue called The Black & Blue—more recent examples being a mid-2000s issue alleging that a giant condom had been placed on top of the school and lolcats being featured in a 2009 issue.

The Tower has faced competition. From 1990 to 1994, a rival "underground" newspaper called The Free Press published after a split between several potential editors of The Tower. An Onion-style news site called The Dungeon was published from 2013 to 2018, while an Instagram account called The Tilted Tower publishes satirical headlines weekly.

== Achievement gap ==
Princeton High School has been considered a case study of the achievement gap in elite high schools. The gap between different groups in academic progress received greater attention in 2005 after the school failed the No Child Left Behind Act. The New York Times ran an article entitled "The Achievement Gap in Elite Schools," by Samuel G. Freedman on September 28, 2005, which accused PHS of neglecting its responsibility to educate minorities. While the cause may be due to socioeconomic status rather than racial segregation, many students in the overwhelmingly white-and-Asian-populated advanced classes can spend most of their high school career sharing only a few classes with their Hispanic or African American peers. According to Freedman's article, "In the early 1990s, an interracial body calling itself the Robeson Group—in homage to Paul Robeson, the most famous product of black Princeton—mobilized to recruit more black teachers and help elect the first black member to the school board."

In 2003, the school became part of the Minority Student Achievement Network, a network of 21 different schools across the country that share Princeton High School's achievement gap problem. MSAN gathers high achieving minority students to address and help fix the growing achievement gap in their schools.

== Administration ==
The school has undergone significant administrative shake-ups in recent years. Gary Snyder, who had been the principal of the school since 2003, retired in 2019. Prior to Snyder's 16 year tenure in the position, the school had seven different principals in the previous ten years. Jessica Baxter, who had been an assistant principal at PHS since February 2012, became the principal for the 2019–2020 school year. After only 18 months in the job, she left to become the principal of Randolph High School closer to her home in January 2021. Assistant principal Jared Warren would finish the 2020–2021 school year as acting principal. Franklin High School principal Frank Chmiel was chosen as the new principal for the 2021–2022 school year. In March 2023, Chmiel was unexpectedly and controversially put on administrative leave and was eventually terminated. Assistant principals Cecilia Birge and Rashone Johnson would temporarily assume responsibilities of the position until retired Robbinsville superintendent Kathie Foster became the interim principal through the end of the school year, eventually being extended through September 30, 2023. Birge would then be chosen as the next permanent principal of the school.

The administration additionally includes three assistant principals and a dean of students.

== Notable alumni ==
See List of Princeton High School (New Jersey) alumni
