= West Jersey Football League =

The West Jersey Football League (or the WJFL) is a 96-school superconference that stretches from Princeton, New Jersey, to Wildwood, New Jersey, encompassing schools from the Colonial Valley Conference, the Burlington County Scholastic League, the Olympic Conference (New Jersey), the Tri-County Conference (New Jersey), the Colonial Conference (New Jersey), and the Cape-Atlantic League. The WJFL is made up of 16 divisions: (American, Capitol, Classic, Colonial, Constitution, Continental, Diamond, Freedom, Independence, Liberty, Memorial, National, Patriot, Royal, United, and Valley) with divisional alignments being based on school size, geography, and a strength-of-program component. The league operates under the auspices of the Leagues and Conferences Committee of the New Jersey State Interscholastic Athletic Association. Three new schools (who are debut programs) were added to the league in the 2024 season. Those schools are Mastery High School of Camden, first-year program Atlantic County Institute of Technology, and KIPP Cooper Norcross Academy. New Egypt High School left the WJFL in 2024 to join the Shore Conference. The league covers teams from counties ranging from Mercer to Cape May.

== History ==
The league comprises 96 teams from public and private high schools in South Jersey and is the second-largest high school football league in New Jersey. The league was created in 2010 as a better way to balance teams that had faced imbalances in the size and quality of teams within conferences. While some regretted the loss of old rivalries, the conference made an effort to establish crossover games between teams that had traditions of playing each other regularly in the past.

With a decline in the number of student athletes playing football at West Windsor-Plainsboro High School North that would be inadequate for the school to field a team of its own, the West Windsor-Plainsboro Regional School District attempted to combine the teams from the two schools to have them operate as a single co-operative football team for the 2017–18 school year based at West Windsor-Plainsboro High School South. Given that the size of the schools is larger than the threshold established by the state for co-op programs (North is classified as Group 3 and South as Group 4 based on the size of the enrollment of each school), the proposal was rejected in a 76–16 vote by the West Jersey Football League and by the Leagues and Conferences Committee of the New Jersey State Interscholastic Athletic Association, before an appeal of the decision was rejected by the Commissioner of the New Jersey Department of Education. In August 2017, the district announced that WW-P North would cancel its program. The members of the canceled program will be eligible to play for the North junior varsity football team, but will not be able to play for the South team.

== Divisions ==
Below is the 2024–25 West Jersey Football League divisional alignment. The new divisions were announced by the WJFL on November 29, 2023. Division alignments change every two years depending on school size. The schools are organized into their 2024–25 NJSIAA group classification. Each division’s number of teams range from 5 to 7.

The 2026-27 alignment was announced January 5, 2026.

American Division

- Cherokee High School (New Jersey) (South Group 5)
- Mainland Regional High School (New Jersey) (South Group 3)
- Millville Senior High School (South Group 4)
- St. Augustine Preparatory School (Non-Public Group A)
- Winslow Township High School (South Group 4)

Capitol Division

- Allentown High School (South Group 3)
- Hightstown High School (South Group 4)
- Hopewell Valley Central High School (South Group 3)
- Notre Dame High School (New Jersey) (Non-Public Group B)
- Nottingham High School (New Jersey) (South Group 3)
- Steinert High School (South Group 4)

Classic Division

- Delsea Regional High School (South Group 3)
- Kingsway Regional High School (South Group 5)
- Timber Creek Regional High School (South Group 3)
- Washington Township High School (New Jersey) (South Group 5)
- Williamstown High School (New Jersey) (South Group 5)

Colonial Division

- Camden High School (New Jersey) (South Group 2)
- Eastside High School (Camden, New Jersey) (South Group 2)
- Lenape High School (South Group 5)
- Rancocas Valley Regional High School (South Group 5)
- Shawnee High School (New Jersey) (South Group 4)

Constitution Division

- Camden High School (New Jersey) (South Group 3)
- Camden Catholic High School (Non-Public Group A)
- Haddonfield Memorial High School (South Group 2)
- Haddon Heights Junior/Senior High School (South Group 2)
- Sterling High School (New Jersey) (South Group 2)
- West Deptford High School (South Group 2)

Continental Division

- Clearview Regional High School (South Group 4)
- Holy Spirit High School (New Jersey) (Non-Public Group B)
- Kingsway Regional High School (South Group 5)
- Vineland High School (South Group 5)
- Washington Township High School (New Jersey) (South Group 5)

Diamond Division

- Paulsboro High School (South Group 1)
- Penns Grove High School (South Group 1)
- Salem High School (New Jersey) (South Group 1)
- Woodbury Junior-Senior High School (South Group 1)
- Woodstown High School (South Group 1)

Freedom Division

- Bordentown Regional High School (South Group 2)
- Burlington City High School (South Group 1)
- Cinnaminson High School (South Group 2)
- Maple Shade High School (South Group 1)
- New Egypt High School (South Group 1)
- Pemberton Township High School (South Group 3)

Horizon Division

- Eustace Preparatory School (Non-Public Group B)
- Gloucester Catholic High School (Non-Public Group B)
- Lindenwold High School (South Group 2)
- Riverside High School (New Jersey) (South Group 1)
- Arthur P. Schalick High School (South Group 1)
- Wildwood High School (South Group 1)

Independence Division

- Cedar Creek High School (New Jersey) (South Group 3)
- Delsea Regional High School (South Group 3)
- Ocean City High School (South Group 4)
- St. Joseph Academy (New Jersey) (Non-Public Group B)

Liberty Division

- Burlington Township High School (South Group 3)
- Delran High School (South Group 2)
- Pennsauken High School (South Group 4)
- Willingboro High School (South Group 2)
- Woodrow Wilson High School (New Jersey) (South Group 3)

Memorial Division

- Eastern Regional High School (South Group 5)
- Hammonton High School (South Group 4)
- Highland Regional High School (South Group 3)
- Rancocas Valley Regional High School (South Group 5)
- Timber Creek Regional High School (South Group 3)

National Division

- Cherry Hill High School West (South Group 4)
- Moorestown High School (South Group 4)
- Northern Burlington County Regional High School (South Group 4)
- Paul VI High School (Non-Public Group A)
- Seneca High School (New Jersey) (South Group 3)
- Triton Regional High School (New Jersey) (South Group 3)

Patriot Division

- Buena Regional High School (South Group 1)
- Clayton High School (New Jersey) (South Group 1)
- Glassboro High School (South Group 1)
- Middle Township High School (South Group 2)
- Pleasantville High School (New Jersey) (South Group 2)

Royal Division

- Cumberland Regional High School (South Group 3)
- Gateway Regional High School (New Jersey) (South Group 1)
- Lower Cape May Regional High School (South Group 2)
- Pennsville Memorial High School (South Group 1)
- Pitman High School (South Group 1)

United Division

- Absegami High School (South Group 4)
- Atlantic City High School (South Group 5)
- Bridgeton High School (South Group 5)
- Egg Harbor Township High School (South Group 5)
- Oakcrest High School (South Group 2)

Valley Division

- Lawrence High School (New Jersey) (South Group 3)
- Robbinsville High School (New Jersey) (South Group 3)
- Steinert High School (South Group 4)
- West Windsor-Plainsboro High School South (Co-op program with West Windsor-Plainsboro High School North) (South Group 5)
