= Henry A. Rosso =

American fundraiser (1917–1999)

Henry A. "Hank" Rosso (13 June 1917 – February 1, 1999) was a leader in the formal development of the fundraising profession in the United States. He began his fundraising career at the March of Dimes, where he helped to arrange the inaugural Mother's March on Polio. He was a founder of the Fund Raising School, which helped codify the principles, concepts, and techniques of the fundraising profession. In 1987, The Fund Raising School became part of the Indiana University Center on Philanthropy, now the Lilly Family School of Philanthropy.

== Career ==
Rosso was born and raised in Princeton, New Jersey. As a student at Princeton High School, he was able to arrange an interview with Albert Einstein in 1935, his first in the United States. He served in the US Army Airborne Division during World War II and received a degree from Syracuse University in 1949.

Rosso got into the field of fundraising through his work in public relations. He was Director of Development and Public Relations at The Manlius School, and later worked as an executive with the consulting firms G. A. Brakeley & Co. and John Price Jones. Over the years, he did work for the United Way, Boy Scouts, Girl Scouts, Planned Parenthood, and other nonprofit organizations.

In 1965, he founded the Development Executives Roundtable in San Francisco, a professional association that still exists today. The organization hosts a bi-annual Hank Rosso Forum together with the Association of Fundraising Professionals.

== The Fund Raising School ==
In 1974, Hank and his spouse Dottie Rosso founded the Fund Raising School in San Rafael, California. Although many nonprofit and religious organizations had been securing charitable gifts of financial support for years, the Fund Raising School helped the profession align around systematic approaches, effectiveness, and ethics.

At the time of its founding, the Fund Raising School was an independent training program, but Rosso aspired to have it become part of a university, where the faculty could engage in research on philanthropy that would enhance the curriculum. In 1987, the Fund Raising School became part of the Indiana University Center on Philanthropy, now the Lilly Family School of Philanthropy. The school now offers graduate degrees including a doctoral degree (PhD) in philanthropic studies and a professional doctorate in philanthropic leadership (PhilD).

A study guide for The Fund-Raising School used by fundraising expert Eugene Tempel, founding dean of the Center on Philanthropy, is in the collections of the Smithsonian's National Museum of American History. Tempel considers the study guide “the foundation of [his] relationship with Hank Rosso and the kernel of the idea for creating the Center on Philanthropy and the Lilly School of Philanthropy."

== Publications ==
Achieving Excellence in Fund Raising by Henry A. Rosso and Associates was first published in 1991 and continues to be recognized as an authoritative textbook on the professional practice of fundraising. It describes each step in the fundraising cycle, such as setting goals, selecting appropriate fundraising techniques, soliciting gifts, and encouraging renewals.

Achieving Excellence in Fund Raising is recommended reading for fundraisers studying to take the standardized exam required to receive a Certified Fund Raising Executive credential. It continues to be refined and updated by other fundraising experts. The 5th edition was published in 2022 and still contains Rosso's essay “A Philosophy of Fund Raising” from the original publication. In that essay, he describes fundraising as an honorable profession that is integral to all the work of a nonprofit organization. He defined fundraising as “the gentle art of teaching the joy of giving,” not a nuisance or a burden.

== Honors and awards ==
- Outstanding Fund Raising Executive of the Year Award from National Society of Fund Raising Executives, 1985
- Honorary Doctor of Laws degree from Pacific Union College, 1987
- Henry A. Rosso Medal for Lifetime Achievement in Fund Raising from Indiana University, 1990
- Honorary Doctor of Laws degree from Indiana University, 1992
- Staley/Robeson/Ryan/St. Lawrence Prize for Research on Fund-Raising and Philanthropy presented by the National Society of Fund Raising Executives, for the book Achieving Excellence in Fund Raising, 1992
