= Gregory S. Glasson =

American musician

Greg Glasson
- Born: Gregory Scott Glasson; December 6, 1974 (age 51); Princeton, New Jersey, U.S.
- Genres: Rock, Soul, Americana,
- Instrument: Bass guitar
- Years active: 1991–present
- Labels: major & Indy
- Website: gregglasson.com

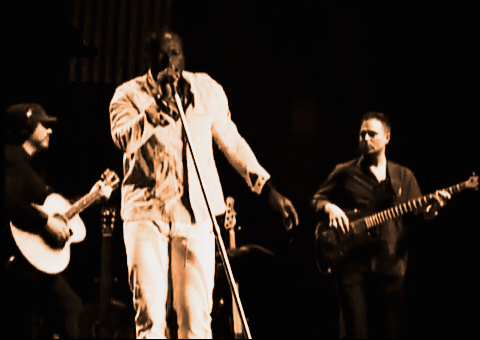
Greg Glasson with Seal "System" Tour

Gregory Scott Glasson (born December 6, 1974) is an American bass player. He has played bass for Grammy Award winning artist Seal both live onstage and on studio recordings. Glasson is also widely known as a solid session player, and has been featured on numerous albums, for a variety of artists. Mostly sought after in the americana, jam and rock field, Glasson has played on major label tracks for artists such as Seal, Alanis Morissette and producer Josh Harris.

Born in Princeton, New Jersey, Glasson grew up in Pennington, New Jersey and graduated from Hopewell Valley Central High School, before attending the University of Maine. At the age 19 he was on the road playing with 90's roots rock act Dear Liza opening for Blues Traveler on their multiplatinum Four tour, as well as extensive tours supporting Derek Trucks Band and a handful of dates on the traveling 90's festival H.O.R.D.E.

A decade of touring and recording led to more session work for major labels and indie bands in NH & Maine. Greg currently plays full-time with North Village & The Seacoast Last Waltz Band.
