= Mariam Nazarian =

American pianist (born 1983)

- Also known as: Marie Nazar
- Born: Mariam Nazarian; 1983 (age 42–43); Armenia
- Origin: Armenia
- Genres: Classical music
- Occupations: Concert pianist, producer
- Instrument: Piano
- Years active: 1993-present
- Website: nazarianmusic.com

Mariam Nazarian (born 1983) a.k.a. Marie Nazar is a concert pianist and producer; she is a graduate of the Mannes College of Music, Harvard University, and University of Cambridge (Clare Hall). Nazarian has performed at Carnegie Hall (New York), Symphony Hall (Boston), and the Grand Philharmonic Hall (St. Petersburg, Russia). She has recorded a commercially released CD of J.S. Bach's Goldberg Variations.

== Early life ==
Nazarian grew up in Plainsboro Township, New Jersey and attended West Windsor-Plainsboro High School North for her freshman and sophomore years, before being home-schooled for the remainder of high school years to avoid conflicts with her professional performing career.
