= West Windsor-Plainsboro High School South =

High school in Mercer County, New Jersey, US

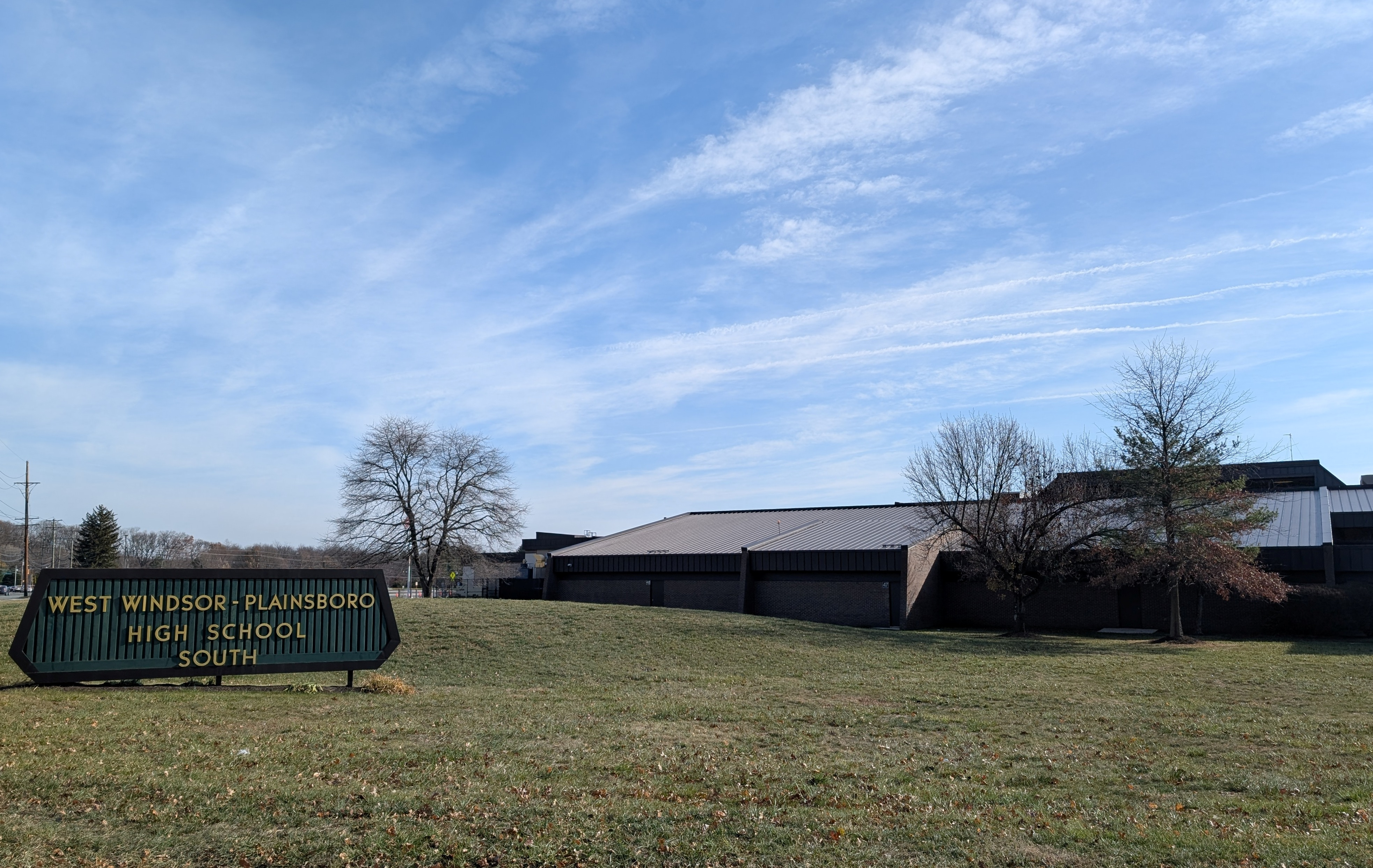
- School fronting Penn Lyle Road and sign

Location
- 346 Clarksville Road; West Windsor, Mercer County, New Jersey 08550; United States; 40.30611°N 74.61961°W

Information
- Type: Public
- Motto: Home of the Pirates
- Established: 1973
- School district: West Windsor-Plainsboro Regional School District
- NCES School ID: 341770003258
- Principal: Valerie Rodriguez
- Faculty: 118.5 FTEs
- Grades: 9-12
- Enrollment: 1,627 (as of 2024–25)
- Student to teacher ratio: 13.7:1
- Campus: Suburban
- Colors: Green; Gold
- Athletics conference: Colonial Valley Conference (general); West Jersey Football League (football)
- Team name: Pirates
- Newspaper: The Pirate's Eye
- Yearbook: Pieces of Gold
- Website: www.west-windsor-plainsboro.k12.nj.us/schools/high_school_south

West Windsor-Plainsboro High School South (known locally as WW-P South or South) is a four-year comprehensive public high school located in the Princeton Junction section of West Windsor in Mercer County, in the U.S. state of New Jersey, serving students in ninth through twelfth grades. The school is part of the West Windsor-Plainsboro Regional School District, a regional school district serving students from West Windsor and from Plainsboro Township (in Middlesex County). It is one of two high schools in the district, the other being West Windsor-Plainsboro High School North.

As of the 2024–25 school year, the school had an enrollment of 1,627 students and 118.5 classroom teachers (on an FTE basis), for a student–teacher ratio of 13.7:1. There were 133 students (8.2% of enrollment) eligible for free lunch and 18 (1.1% of students) eligible for reduced-cost lunch.

Students at High School South outperform other students in New Jersey on college admissions tests, scoring an average of 1351/1600 on the SAT compared to New Jersey students' average of 1080/1600. The school determines both unweighted and weighted GPAs for students and does not rank students with the exception of the top five in every graduating class.

== History ==
Prior to the school's opening, students from West Windsor and Plainsboro townships attended Princeton High School as part of sending/receiving relationships with the Princeton Public Schools. The high school was opened in September 1973 as West Windsor-Plainsboro High School and was described by The New York Times as the state's first high school to be developed with an "open space" plan, with open areas that could be divided off for instructional space that it said "looks more like a modern airline terminal than a high school". The school, constructed at a cost of $8 million (equivalent to $58.0 million in 2025), initially served 700 students in grades 7 to 10, while the remaining students in grades 11 and 12 finished their schooling at Princeton High School through their graduation, with an expected enrollment of 1,300 once the partnership with Princeton was ended. Population growth in the district throughout the 1990s necessitated an additional high school. In 1997, the school was renamed by appending "South" to the school's name concurrent with the opening of West Windsor-Plainsboro High School North.

Renovations and additions begun in 2006 and completed at end of the 2008–09 school year included a new gym, more parking spaces, a new cover for the pool, more classrooms, improvements on the HVAC system, and artificial turf for the football field. The estimated cost of the projects included in the referendum was $23 million. As of January 2010, all projects had been completed including the new pool 'bubble' enclosure.

In 2018, the school worked with FVHD Architects-Planners to renovate the playhouse little theater in addition to building a new two-story science classroom and front entrance.

== Awards, recognition and rankings ==
During the 1992–93 school year, West Windsor-Plainsboro High School was awarded the National Blue Ribbon School Award of Excellence by the United States Department of Education, the highest award an American school can receive.

In its 2013 report on "America's Best High Schools", The Daily Beast ranked the school 129th in the nation among participating public high schools and 8th overall (and second for non-magnet schools) among schools in New Jersey. In 2012, US News ranked the school 11th in the nation for STEM (Science, Technology, Engineering, and Math). The school was ranked 132nd in the nation and seventh in New Jersey on the list of "America's Best High Schools 2012" prepared by The Daily Beast / Newsweek, with rankings based primarily on graduation rate, matriculation rate for college and number of Advanced Placement / International Baccalaureate courses taken per student, with lesser factors based on average scores on the SAT / ACT, average AP/IB scores and the number of AP/IB courses available to students. In August 2011, The Star-Ledger's Inside Jersey ranked the school 1st among the 330 public schools in the state of New Jersey. One notable feature of High School South is that it combines both AP Physics B and C courses into a single course known as Advanced Topics in Physics Honors. This required special permission from the College Board; this was approved when AP Courses were first made. It is the only school that offers such a course.

In the 2011 "Ranking America's High Schools" issue by The Washington Post, the school was ranked 9th in New Jersey and 407th nationwide.

The school was the 35th-ranked public high school in New Jersey out of 339 schools statewide in New Jersey Monthly magazine's September 2014 cover story on the state's "Top Public High Schools", using a new ranking methodology. The school had been ranked 62nd in the state of 328 schools in 2012, after being ranked 16th in 2010 out of 322 schools listed. The magazine ranked the school 21st in 2008 out of 316 schools. The school was ranked 9th in the magazine's September 2006 issue, which included 316 schools across the state. The school was ranked 5th in the 2004 issue, while West Windsor-Plainsboro High School North was ranked 1st during the same year.

Schooldigger.com ranked the school tied for 53rd out of 381 public high schools statewide in its 2011 rankings (a decrease of 29 positions from the 2010 ranking) which were based on the combined percentage of students classified as proficient or above proficient on the mathematics (93.1%) and language arts literacy (96.5%) components of the High School Proficiency Assessment (HSPA).

The school's 2010 graduating class had the second-highest SAT scores in rankings calculated by the New Jersey Department of Education, with West Windsor-Plainsboro High School South having a combined score of 1,843 on the three sections of the test, behind the 1,860 achieved by Princeton High School students.

In 2013, U.S. News & World Report ranked the school 8th in the state and first in New Jersey among non-magnet schools.

In 2014, West Windsor-Plainsboro High School South's varsity debate team won the Colonial Valley Conference's championships, earning the team's first conference title since it became a member in 1973.

== Extracurricular activities ==
The school newspaper is called The Pirate's Eye, which won the Columbia Scholastic Press Association Gold Medal in both 2007 and 2008. The school's radio station is WWPH 107.9 FM, shared with West Windsor-Plainsboro High School North.

=== Athletics ===
The West Windsor-Plainsboro High School South Pirates compete in the Colonial Valley Conference, which is comprised high schools from Mercer, Middlesex and Monmouth counties, operating under the supervision of the New Jersey State Interscholastic Athletic Association (NJSIAA). With 1,199 students in grades 10–12, the school was classified by the NJSIAA for the 2019–20 school year as Group IV for most athletic competition purposes, which included schools with an enrollment of 1,060 to 5,049 students in that grade range. After High School North suspended its football program, the district received approval from the NJSIAA to establish a co-operative North / South football team named "WW-P United" starting in the 2018–19 school year. The football team competes in the Capitol Division of the 94-team West Jersey Football League superconference and was classified by the NJSIAA as Group V South for football for 2024–2026, which included schools with 1,333 to 2,324 students.

The school mascot is the Pirate and the school colors are green and gold, with accents of black and white. From 1973 to 2003, the Pirate football team bore a "Golden Dome," or a yellow helmet, which for much of that time was blank without a decal. It changed to a green helmet with a yellow stripe down the middle. Starting in 2018, South's football team combined with High School North. Some of South's historically dominant athletic teams include both Boys' and Girls' swimming and diving, tennis, golf, basketball, fencing and lacrosse.

The school participates as the host school / lead agency for joint cooperative ice hockey and football teams with West Windsor-Plainsboro High School North. These co-op programs operate under agreements scheduled to expire at the end of the 2023–24 school year.

With a decline in the number of student athletes playing football at WW-P South that would be inadequate for the school to field a team of its own, the district attempted to combine the teams from the two schools to have them operate as a single co-operative football team for the 2017–18 school year based at South HS. Given that the size of the schools is larger than the threshold established by the state for co-op programs (North is classified as Group III and South as Group IV, based on the size of the enrollment of each school), the proposal was rejected by the West Jersey Football League and by the Leagues and Conferences Committee of the New Jersey State Interscholastic Athletic Association, before an appeal of the decision was rejected by the Commissioner of the New Jersey Department of Education. In August 2017, the district announced that WW-P North would cancel its program. The members of the canceled program will be eligible to play for the North junior varsity football team, but will not be able to play for the South team. The West Windsor-Plainsboro High School South team and West Windsor Plainsboro High School North team merged for the 2018 season to create the WW-P football team. This combined football team was able to field a varsity, junior varsity and freshmen team for the 2018 and 2019 season.

The South varsity boys' tennis squad has been consistently ranked in the top 10 of New Jersey high school tennis teams. The 2007 season was one of the more successful seasons in recent school history. Although the team did not capture the state title, it secured a #2 ranking in the state and was very close to defeating the #1 ranked team. This season also featured a South singles player to advance to the quarterfinals of the State Singles Tournament and the first doubles team to win the State Doubles Tournament. The 2007 boys' tennis team won the Central, Group IV state sectional championship with a 4–1 win against East Brunswick High School. The most dominant period displayed by the team was from 1996 to 2000, when they reached the Tournament of Champions finals for five consecutive years, and also featured singles players in the finals and semifinals of the State Singles Tournament in each of those years. The South Varsity Boys' tennis squad was ranked #2 in the state for five consecutive years during this span. In 1996 and 1997, four out of the seven players on the squad were nationally ranked tennis players. During this period, the team captured five consecutive Central New Jersey Group IV state titles, five consecutive Group IV state titles, and an unprecedented sweep, in which they did not lose one single match, of the Mercer County Tournament four years in a row. The 2000 Group IV title marked the fourth consecutive year in which the team had defeated Cherry Hill High School East for the group title. The 2011 team won the Mercer County Tournament for its second consecutive year.

The South varsity boys' golf team has been ranked consistently by The Star-Ledger among its Top 10 high school golf teams, in addition to success at the county, sectional, and state level. Notable seasons include the 2006 and 2007 seasons in which they captured the 2006 Cherry Valley Invitational, 2006 Mercer County Championship, placed 2nd at the 2006 South/Central Group III state sectional championship, placed 2nd in Group III at the 2006 state championship, placed 2nd at the 2007 Mercer County Championship and won the 2007 South/Central Group III state sectional championship. Over the last two years, the team has established an impeccable record: losing just 3 times and winning well over 30 matches. One of their greatest victories took place in the 2007 season against Princeton High School. These two historically bitter rivals battled for the title of dominating team in Mercer County and placed their respective state rankings of #2 and #4 on the line. At the end of the day, the South team prevailed with a victory of 186-187 that came down to the last putt of the last player of the last group. The Pirates put an end to the Tigers previous three-year unbeaten record in Mercer County matches. They finished the 2007 season as the #12 ranked team in the state.

The boys' swimming team won the Division B state championship in 1985, 1986 and 1989. The girls team won the Division B title in 1988. The girls' swim team won the Central - A state sectional championship in 2007 with a 97–73 win over Montgomery High School. The girls' swimming team also came in first place at the 2008 Mercer County Tournament, with Notre Dame in second. In the 2008–09 season saw an undefeated CVC season, and MCT first place, a sectional championship, and finally the state title, winning the Public A state championship against the top seeded Westfield High School Blue Devils with a score of 90–80. Both the girls' and boys' swim teams were the Colonial Valley Conference Champions for the 2007–08 season. The 2010 girls' team tied 85–85 with Westfield for the Public A title, only the second time that a tie occurred in the tournament final.

The girls' tennis team won the Group IV state championship in 2014, defeating Ridge High School 3–2 in the tournament final.

The girls' varsity cheerleading squad placed 1st in 2008 in the small division at the annual CVC cheerleading competition held at High School North. This is the first time South's cheerleaders have placed 1st in the CVC competition.

The boys fencing team was the sabre team winner in 2010, 2012 and 2015.

The boys' and girls' cross country teams have also had great success in recent years. The boys' cross country team won the Group IV state title in 2012 and 2013. South's Brian Leung was the 2007 New Jersey Cross-Country Champion and the team finished 7th in the state, the program's best season to date. The boys' cross country team also won a state sectional title in 2008 and 2019. The year 2010 marked the Pirate Boys' best cross-country season to date. They won the Mercer County Championship (snapping rival WW-P North's four-year winning streak), won the Central Jersey Group IV title, finished second in Group IV, and a strong 3rd place at the state meet, before finishing 5th at the Nike Northeast Regional.

The girls' cross country team won the Group IV state championship in 2013.

The boys' volleyball team won the 2026 South Jersey Group III sectional title, defeating Williamstown High School in the sectional final.

In 2024, South created a cricket team comprised of nearly 40 to 45 people. Their first game was an exhibition win against Monroe Township High School.

=== Model United Nations ===
The West Windsor-Plainsboro High School South Model United Nations program dates back to the late 1970s and consists of approximately 40 students. It is the most awarded team in the entirety of South's extracurricular program, and consistently ranks in the top 10 MUN teams in the nation. The South MUN team picks conference rosters based on open-session mocks held in the school prior to every conference. The club annually consists of two advisers and six elected officers. Typically, the mocks involve more than 100 students vying for a limited number of conference spots, with roster decisions being made by the elected officers. As opposed to other successful high school MUN teams, South delegates, once selected, conduct individual research outside of school. As a result, club meetings are almost nonexistent. South MUN consistently wins delegation awards at conferences hosted by universities such as Princeton University, University of Pennsylvania (Ivy League Model United Nations Conference), Georgetown University, Rutgers University George Washington University, Johns Hopkins University, and Cornell University. In 2011, SouthMUN won such an award at every attended conference, winning Best Small Delegation at RUMUN, Outstanding Large Delegation at PMUNC, Best Large Delegation at ILMUNC, Best Small Delegation at North American Invitational Model United Nations, and Outstanding Large Delegation at CMUNC. In 2014, SouthMUN performed very similarly to the 2011 season, winning delegation awards at 4 out of 5 of the conferences attended, winning Best Small at William and Mary High School Model United Nations (WMHSMUN), Best Large at PMUNC, Best Large at Washington Area Model United Nations Conference (WAMUNC) and Best Small at CMUNC. It was also recognized for hosting a one-day High School Conference named SouthMUNC. In the 2017–2018 season, SouthMUN had one of its best years ever, winning best delegation awards at 4 out of the 5 national conferences attended, winning Best Small at Princeton University Model United Nations Conference (PMUNC), Best Medium Delegation at Rutgers Model United Nations (RUMUN), Best Small Delegation at the Ivy League Model United Nations Conference (ILMUNC), and a Best Small Delegation at Cornell University Model United Nations Conference (CMUNC).

=== Science Olympiad ===
The Science Olympiad won 1st place in the regional and state competition in 2006 and 2007, earning spots in the national tournaments at Indiana University Bloomington and Wichita State University. They placed 11th in 2006 then 6th in 2007, out of more than 50 of the nation's most talented teams.

In 2008, the team earned 3rd place in regionals and 2nd at states, losing to rival team West Windsor-Plainsboro High School North. In 2009, the team placed 2nd at regionals, losing to North but came back at states to win 1st. They attended the Nationals competition at Augusta State University. At the tournament, the team placed 13th in the nation, and 1st place in Protein Modeling. In 2010, the school placed 1st in the state and 18th in the nation at the University of Illinois at Urbana–Champaign.

In 2011, the school once again placed 1st in New Jersey. The High School South Science Olympiad team won Third Place at the National Tournament held at the University of Wisconsin-Madison in 2011; this is the highest honor ever achieved by High School South in this competition. The team received a gold medal in Dynamic Planet; four silver medals in Microbe Mission, Ornithology, Protein Modeling, and Sumo Bots; a bronze medal in Chemistry Lab; a Fourth Place Medal in Helicopters; a Fifth Place Medal in Mission Possible; and two Sixth Place Medals in Ecology and Mousetrap Vehicle. In addition, the team received a gold medal in Materials Science, a trial event.

During the 2012 season, South placed 1st in the state again for the 4th consecutive year and attended the national tournament at the University of Central Florida in Orlando, where they placed 9th overall. South again won the New Jersey competition in 2013 and competed in the national competition in Ohio with 1st places in Anatomy & Physiology and Fermi Questions.

In 2014, South won the State Tournament for the 6th year in a row and went on to finish in the top ten at Nationals. Medals were achieved in Materials Science (gold), Water Quality (gold), Astronomy (silver), Dynamic Planet (bronze), and three other events.

In 2017, High School South once again won the State Tournament and returned to the National Tournament held at Wright State University in Dayton, Ohio. The team placed 20th overall and won medals in Disease Detectives (6th), Materials Science (6th), Microbe Mission (5th), and Optics (6th).

In 2019, South won the state tournament and attended the national tournament at Cornell University, winning the Dupont Enterprise award and placing 14th overall.

=== Music and arts ===
The music program at South has earned state acclaim. There are currently three orchestras, two of which are philharmonic, three choirs, and three bands. Other music programs include three a cappella groups, two jazz bands, and a marching band and colorguard. The marching band/guard placed first in 2005 in the USSBA Group II Open category. The band finished third at the 2007 United States Scholastic Band Association National Championships.

=== Theatre ===
The HSS theatre department has produced plays such as She Kills Monsters (that touches on grief, homophobia, and coming of age) and Harvey (familial burdens, grief, and mental health awareness) that gave spotlights to many different minorities. The department hosted an LGBTQ+ company that gave support and resources to queer youth, giving a voice to those who feel hidden.

=== Science Bowl ===
In 2010, the team secured a first-place finish at the regional tournament held in the Princeton Plasma Physics Laboratory. The team placed 9th in the nation. In the 2011 school year, the team placed 2nd in the regional competition to High Technology High School. In the 2011–12 school year, the team placed 2nd again in the regional competition, losing to Princeton High School. In the 2013 Competition the team again won first, defeating Bergen County Academies in the finals of the Winners' Bracket and the overall competition. The 2013 team went on to place in the Top 16 Nationally, winning a prize of $1000. In 2015, 2016, and 2017, the team qualified for the National Tournament.

=== International science / mathematics competition ===
Several students from the school have been recognized for their performance in international competitions. These awards include a gold medal at the 2001 International Mathematical Olympiad, silver medal at the 2006 International Olympiad in Informatics, bronze medal at the 2007 International Chemistry Olympiad, gold medal / absolute winner at the 2011 International Biology Olympiad, gold medal at the 2011 International Physics Olympiad, silver medal at the 2014 International Chemistry Olympiad, silver medal at the 2014 International Linguistics Olympiad silver medal at the 2014 International Olympiad on Astronomy and Astrophysics, bronze medal in 2015 at the International Mathematical Olympiad and a gold medal at the 2015 International Physics Olympiad.

== Administration ==
The school's principal is Valerie Rodriguez. Her core administration team includes two assistant principals.

== Notable alumni ==
The following attended West Windsor-Plainsboro High School, renamed West Windsor-Plainsboro High School South in 1997:

- Kevin Barry (born 1978), right-handed relief pitcher for Atlanta Braves
- Ron Berkowitz (born 1972, class of 1990), CEO and founder of Berk Communications
- Akash Bobba (class of 2021), staffer at the Department of Government Efficiency
- Aneesh Chopra (born 1972, class of 1990), technology executive who served as the first Chief Technology Officer of the United States
- Boris Epshteyn (born 1982, class of 2000), political strategist, investment banker and attorney
- Eileen Filler-Corn (born 1964, class of 1982), member of the Virginia House of Delegates since 2010 who was chosen to become the first woman to serve as Speaker
- Mark Flythe (born 1968), former American football defensive end who played for the New York Giants
- Cary Guffey (born 1972), actor who appeared in Close Encounters of the Third Kind
- Ethan Hawke (born 1970), Academy Award-nominated actor
- Katie Kellner (born 1991), distance runner and coach who specializes in the marathon
- Ramesses McGuiness (born 2000), footballer who plays for the US Virgin Islands national team
- Christopher McQuarrie (born 1968; class of 1986), Academy Award-winning screenwriter, The Usual Suspects
- James Murphy (born 1970, class of 1988), musician (LCD Soundsystem), producer (DFA Records), DJ
- Bill Schroeder (born 1958), former major league baseball player who is now a broadcaster for the Milwaukee Brewers
- Bryan Singer (born 1965, class of 1984), director of the films The Usual Suspects, X-Men and Superman Returns, and of the TV series House, set at the fictional Princeton-Plainsboro Teaching Hospital in New Jersey
- Felicia Zhang (born 1993, class of 2011), United States figure skater in the 2014 Winter Olympics
