= West Windsor-Plainsboro Regional School District =

School district in Mercer County, New Jersey, US

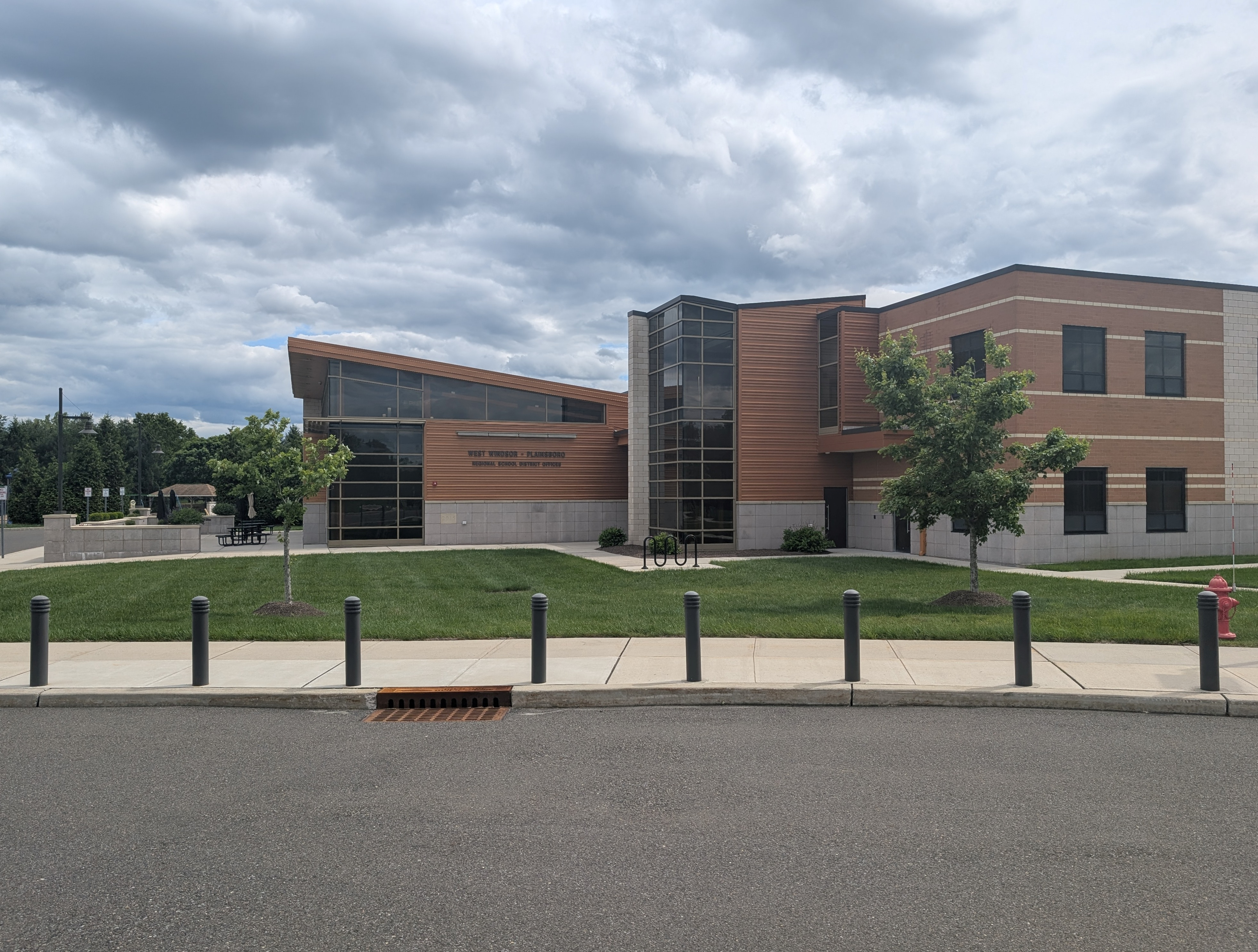
- District's main office building

Address
- 321 Village Road East Princeton Junction, Mercer County, New Jersey, 08550; United States
- Coordinates: 40.282351°N 74.614212°W

District information
- Grades: PreK-12
- Superintendent: David Aderhold
- Business administrator: Christopher Russo
- Schools: 10

Students and staff
- Enrollment: 8,900 (as of 2024–25)
- Faculty: 775.8 FTEs
- Student–teacher ratio: 11.5:1

Other information
- District Factor Group: J
- Website: www.ww-p.org
Ind.	Per pupil	District spending	Rank (*)	K-12 average	%± vs. average
1A	Total Spending	$17,321	33	$18,891	−8.3%
1	Budgetary Cost	13,701	37	14,783	−7.3%
2	Classroom Instruction	8,580	48	8,763	−2.1%
6	Support Services	1,983	30	2,392	−17.1%
8	Administrative Cost	1,420	46	1,485	−4.4%
10	Operations & Maintenance	1,379	23	1,783	−22.7%
13	Extracurricular Activities	296	70	268	10.4%
16	Median Teacher Salary	83,850	102	64,043
Data from NJDoE 2014 Taxpayers' Guide to Education Spending. *Of K-12 districts with more than 3,500 students. Lowest spending=1; Highest=103

The West Windsor-Plainsboro Regional School District is a comprehensive high achieving regional public school district in the U.S. state of New Jersey, serving students in pre-kindergarten through twelfth grade from West Windsor Township (in Mercer County) and Plainsboro Township (in Middlesex County). There are four elementary schools (grades PreK/K - 3), two upper elementary schools (grades 4 and 5), two middle schools (grades 6 - 8) and two high schools (grades 9 - 12). Niche.com listed the district as fifth-best in New Jersey, and 73rd best in the nation, according to its 2025 Best Schools ranking.

As of the 2024–25 school year, the district, comprised of 10 schools, had an enrollment of 8,900 students and 775.8 classroom teachers (on an FTE basis), for a student–teacher ratio of 11.5:1.

== History ==
The West Windsor-Plainsboro Regional School District was the result of the 1969 merger of two separate, neighboring school districts - the Plainsboro School District and the West Windsor School District - as the population of both municipalities was starting to grow rapidly. The districts merged so that they could accommodate the increasing number of students newly enrolling. Dutch Neck and Wicoff elementary schools were constructed well before the establishment of the regional district.

Constructed at a cost of $8 million (equivalent to $58.0 million in 2025) and designed to ultimately accommodate an enrollment of 1,300 students in grades 7-12, West Windsor-Plainsboro High School (since renamed as West Windsor-Plainsboro High School South) opened in 1973 for grades 7-10, with students in grades 11 and 12 completing their education at Princeton High School.

With a decline in the number of student-athletes playing football at WW-P North that would be inadequate for the school to field a team of its own, the district attempted to combine the teams from the two schools to have them operate as a single cooperative football team for the 2017-18 school year based at South HS. Given that the size of the schools is larger than the threshold established by the state for co-op programs (North is classified as Group III and South as Group IV, based on the size of the enrollment of each school), the proposal was rejected by the West Jersey Football League and by the Leagues and Conferences Committee of the New Jersey State Interscholastic Athletic Association, before an appeal of the decision was rejected by the commissioner of the New Jersey Department of Education. In August 2017, the district announced that WW-P North would cancel its program. The members of the canceled program will be eligible to play for the North junior varsity football team, but will not be able to play for the South team.

The district had been classified by the New Jersey Department of Education as being in District Factor Group "J", the highest of eight groupings. District Factor Groups organize districts statewide to allow comparison by common socioeconomic characteristics of the local districts. From lowest socioeconomic status to highest, the categories are A, B, CD, DE, FG, GH, I and J.

== Awards and recognition ==
The West Windsor-Plainsboro Regional School District is one of the top achieving districts in New Jersey. The high schools have held first to fifth places in many of the state's rankings. In 2004, West Windsor-Plainsboro High School North was ranked #1 in the state of New Jersey by New Jersey Monthly magazine and West Windsor-Plainsboro High School South was ranked #5. West Windsor-Plainsboro High School South was the 9th ranked public high school, and North was 18th-ranked, in New Jersey out of 316 schools statewide, in New Jersey Monthly magazine's September 2006 cover story on the state's Top Public High Schools.

West Windsor-Plainsboro High School South was recognized during the 1992-93 school year, and Maurice Hawk Elementary School was recognized during the 1993-94 school year, with the National Blue Ribbon Award of Excellence from the United States Department of Education, the highest honor that an American school can achieve.

West Windsor-Plainsboro High School North was recognized in the 2006-07 school year with the Blue Ribbon School Award of Excellence by the U.S. Department of Education, the highest award an American school can receive.

In both the 2004–05 and 2006-07 school years, the Community Middle School Science Olympiad team was first in the country. Starting in the 2001-2002 school years, they were also the Science Olympiad state and regional champions for every subsequent year. However, Thomas R. Grover Middle School defeated Community Middle School in the 2019-2020 state competition but did not compete in Nationals due to COVID-19 cancellations.

The West Windsor-Plainsboro Regional School District supports FIRST Robotics Competition Team #1923, The MidKnight Inventors, which welcomes students from both high schools. The team has been competing since 2006, and mentors FIRST programs across all grade levels in the district, as well as internationally. The team has won four regional competitions including, 2009 New Jersey Regional, 2011 Connecticut Regional, 2017 Mount Olive District, and 2017 Montgomery District. They have been recognized with various awards for community outreach & spreading the mission of FIRST, and has received individual recognitions for both students and mentors on the team's leadership & effective communication within the scope of the FIRST Robotics Competition. The MidKnight Inventors, Team #1923, has made it to the FIRST Championships six years (2009, 2011, 2013, 2015-2017) since 2006 when they first began competing. In 2015, at the FIRST Championship in St. Louis, Missouri, The MidKnight Inventors finished 3rd, out of the 3,000 teams that competed in the FRC competition.

== Controversy ==
West Windsor-Plainsboro is notable for its ongoing divide over the school district's academics. The controversy comes amidst Superintendent of Schools David Aderhold's plan to ease the high school curriculum. The plan consisted of the elimination of midterm and final exams, increasing the number of no homework nights, and the removal of the A&E math program for the 4th and 5th grades. According to a Christmas-day New York Times article by author Kyle Spencer, the divide appears to be somewhat racial, as the area has a high Asian-American population, such as Indian, Pakistani, Chinese, Japanese, and Korean students. Some parents have argued that such change hinders the overall academic experience. Other parents believe the children are stressed out to an unhealthy degree. It has been argued that placing too much stress on academics with the intent of going to a good college is wrong, as colleges are more interested in projects and student-led activities than grades alone. The high schools within the West Windsor-Plainsboro School District have been outlined as prep or pre-college institutions, rather than as public high schools. Some have noted that the Asian parents (many first-generation immigrants) are simply trying to boost their children into the middle class. However, there were many that do not fall along the racial divide.

An ongoing, parallel controversy in the district has consisted of students, teachers, and alumni who allege that the administrators and parents of the district overemphasize funding for and teaching of STEM at the expense of the humanities, arts, and sometimes languages. Attempts to cut language programs, including German and Latin, have ignited controversy and led to allegations that the school district under-prepares students to study non-STEM fields or to work outside of the United States.

A controversy regarding youth sports took place in September of the 2020-2021 school year. Parent and student advocates of youth sports fought for Superintendent David Aderhold to reverse the cancellation of fall sports. The advocates alleged that the cancellation of fall sports negatively impacted the mental health of student-athletes, exacerbated by the COVID-19 Pandemic. The advocates were met with resistance by the Administration and community members who prioritized the well-being of the community during the COVID-19 pandemic.

== Schools ==
Schools in the district (with 2024–25 enrollment data from the National Center for Education Statistics) are:

Lower elementary schools

- Dutch Neck Elementary School (located in West Windsor: 557 students; in grades K-3)
  - Melissa Lockett, principal
- Maurice Hawk Elementary School (West Windsor: 723; PreK-3)
  - Sara Bright, principal
- Town Center Elementary School (Plainsboro: 439; PreK-3)
  - Erin Falk, principal
- J.V.B. Wicoff Elementary School (Plainsboro: 334; K-3)
  - Guy Tulp, principal

Upper elementary schools

- Millstone River School (Plainsboro: 772; 3-5)
  - Heather Shanklin, principal
- Village School (West Windsor: 657; 4-5)
  - Azure Diggs, principal

Middle schools

- Community Middle School (Plainsboro: 1,029; 6-8)
  - Kyle Schimpf, principal
- Thomas R. Grover Middle School (West Windsor: 1,183; 6-8)
  - Maureen Cook, principal

High schools

- West Windsor-Plainsboro High School North (Plainsboro: 1,510; 9-12)
  - Lamont Thomas, principal
- West Windsor-Plainsboro High School South (West Windsor: 1,627; 9-12). Formerly West Windsor-Plainsboro High School, before High School North was established in 1997.
  - Valarie Rodriguez, principal

== Administration ==
Members of the district administration are:

- David Aderhold, superintendent of schools
- Christopher Russo, assistant superintendent for finance and board secretary

== Board of education ==
The district's board of education, comprised of nine members, sets policy and oversees the fiscal and educational operation of the district through its administration. As a Type II school district, the board's trustees are elected directly by voters to serve three-year terms of office on a staggered basis, with three seats up for election each year held (since 2013) as part of the November general election. The board appoints a superintendent to oversee the district's day-to-day operations and a business administrator to supervise the business functions of the district. Seats on the board of education are allocated based on the population of the constituent municipalities, with five seats allocated to West Windsor and four to Plainsboro.
