= Princeton Packet =

Newspaper in Princeton, New Jersey

The Princeton Packet
- Type: Weekly newspaper
- Owner(s): Packet Media, LLC
- Publisher: Joe Eisele
- Founded: 1786
- Language: English
- Headquarters: Princeton, New Jersey
- Circulation: 23,852
- ISSN: 0746-178X
- Website: centraljersey.com

The Princeton Packet is a weekly newspaper serving the Princeton, New Jersey area. The company traces its lineage to 1786. Packet Media, LLC. is the publisher of 5 community newspapers, a weekly arts and entertainment supplement and a series of local-news-based websites. The paper was purchased by former Wall Street Journal publisher Barney Kilgore in 1955, inherited by his family after his death, and has been expanded by acquisition of newspapers in adjoining towns. According to its advertiser kit, the Packet's circulation as of 2013 was approximately 20,000. The company's products serve more than 40 municipalities in Central New Jersey including Mercer, Middlesex, Somerset, Hunterdon, Monmouth, Ocean counties as well as Burlington County.

In January 2009 the Packet website packetonline.com became centraljersey.com.

In March 2016, Princeton Packet Inc. announced a deal that will form a new company to operate the Packet and other newspapers and websites. The CEO of Broad Street Media will oversee operations of the company; James Kilgore would continue as the publisher and a board member.

In July 2016, Richard Donnelly purchased a majority interest in Packet Media LLC, and took over as CEO, with Perry Corsetti taking over as COO. Subsequently, Joseph L. Eisele IV, was named Publisher in September 2016.

== See also ==
- List of newspapers in New Jersey
