= Colonial Valley Conference =

The Colonial Valley Conference (CVC) is an athletic conference in Central Jersey composed of high schools located primarily in Mercer County, New Jersey, with one member school in Monmouth County (Allentown High School) and one in Middlesex County (West Windsor-Plainsboro High School North). The conference operates under the supervision of the New Jersey State Interscholastic Athletic Association (NJSIAA).

- Allentown High School Redbirds
- Ewing High School Blue Devils
- Steinert High School (Hamilton East) Spartans
- Nottingham High School (Hamilton North) Northstars
- Hamilton High School (Hamilton West) Hornets
- Hightstown High School Rams
- Hopewell Valley Central High School Bulldogs
- Lawrence High School Cardinals
- Notre Dame High School Irish
- Princeton High School Tigers
- Princeton Day School Panthers
- Robbinsville High School Ravens
- Trenton Central High School Tornadoes
- West Windsor-Plainsboro High School North Knights (Plainsboro)
- West Windsor-Plainsboro High School South Pirates (West Windsor)
