= Princeton Junction, New Jersey =

Populated place in Mercer County, New Jersey, US

- Census-designated place
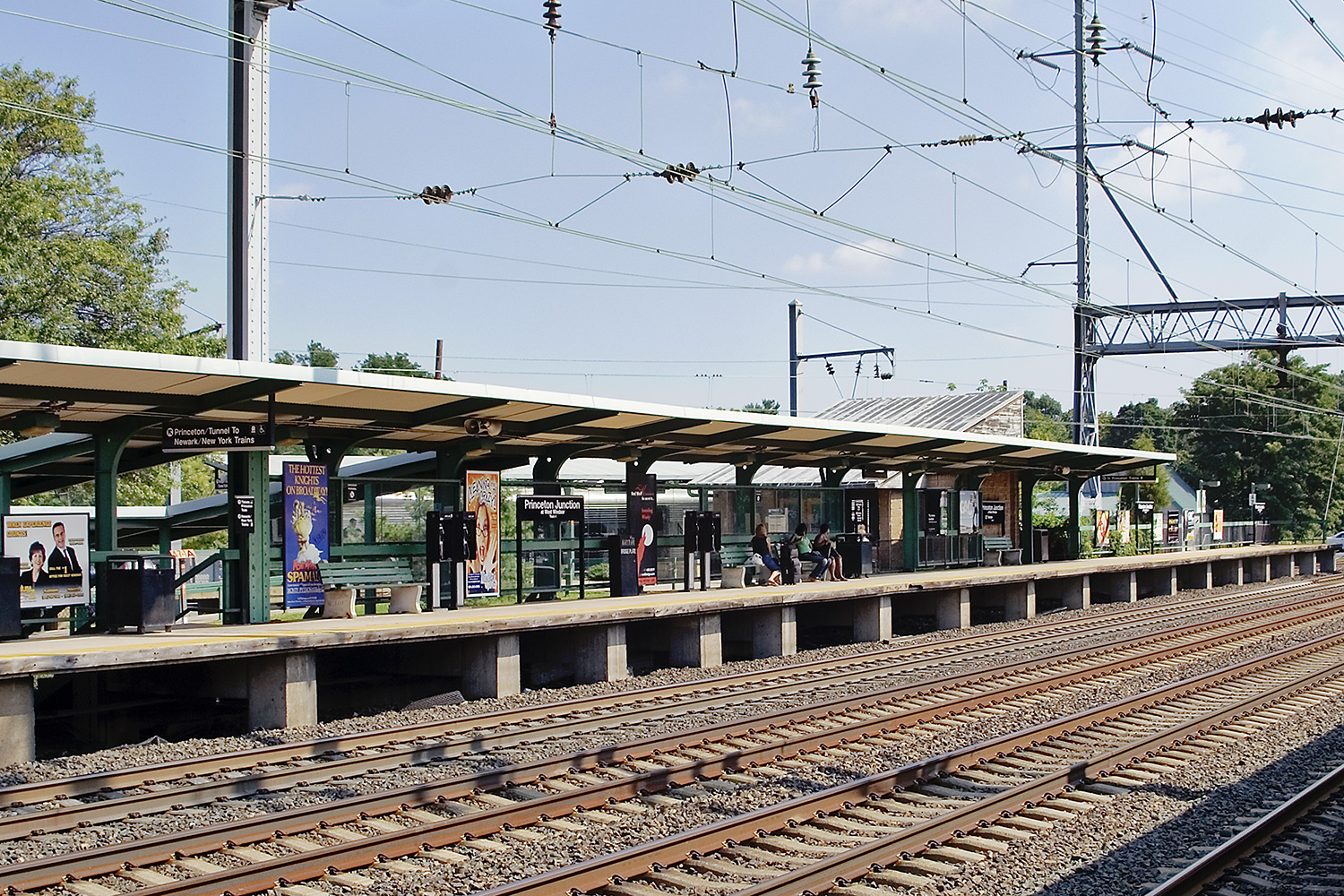
- Princeton Junction train station

- Location in Mercer County (right) and the state of New Jersey (left)

- Location in Mercer County Location in New Jersey Location in the United States
- Coordinates: 40.323294°N 74.621157°W
- Country: United States
- State: New Jersey
- County: Mercer
- Township: West Windsor

Area
  - Total: 1.85 sq mi (4.80 km^{2})
  - Land: 1.82 sq mi (4.72 km^{2})
  - Water: 0.031 sq mi (0.08 km^{2}) 1.48%
- Elevation: 72 ft (22 m)

Population (2020)
  - Total: 2,475
  - Density: 1,357.8/sq mi (524.26/km^{2})
- Time zone: UTC−05:00 (Eastern (EST))
  - Summer (DST): UTC−04:00 (Eastern (EDT))
- ZIP Codes: 08550 (Princeton Junction); 08540 (Princeton)
- Area code: 609
- FIPS code: 34-60960
- GNIS feature ID: 02389708

Princeton Junction is an unincorporated community and census-designated place (CDP) located within West Windsor township, Mercer County, in the U.S. state of New Jersey. As of the 2020 census, the CDP's population was 2,475.

== History ==
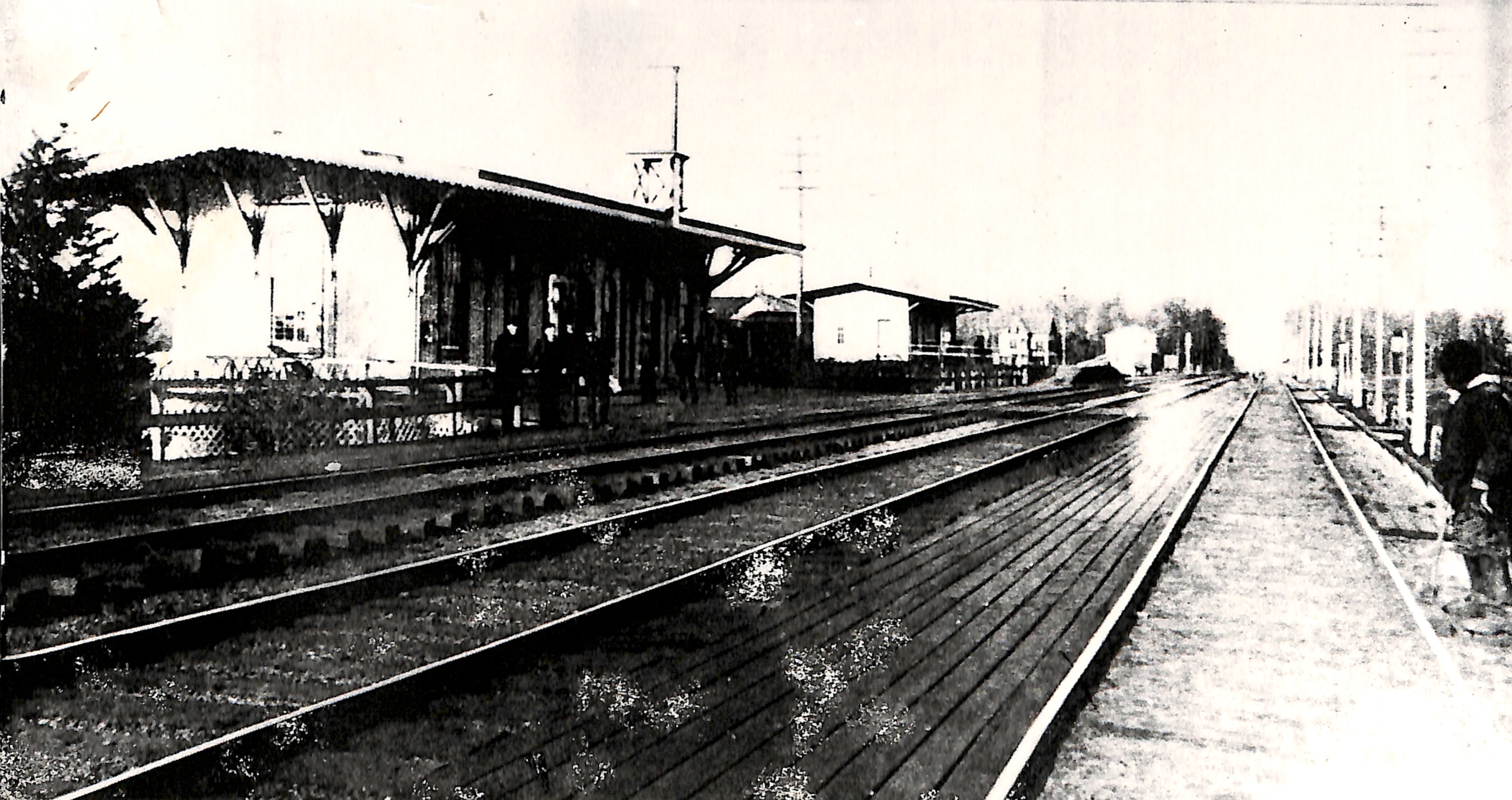
The earliest known photograph of the Princeton Junction train station - c. 1870s. The station building was originally located on the northwest side of the railroad tracks.

Following the mid-1860s relocation of the Camden & Amboy rail line from next to the Delaware & Raritan Canal to the present location of the Northeast Corridor, and the subsequent construction of a train station south of the intersection of Washington Road and the new rail line, a community called "Princeton Junction" developed. This community originally featured several farmhouses, a hotel, a general store, a feed mill, and several other businesses centered around the intersection of Station Drive and Washington Road, profiting off of access to other cities provided by the rail line.

The construction of the neighborhood of Berrien City (focused around Scott Avenue, Alexander Road, and Berrien Avenue) starting in the 1910s represented West Windsor's first planned development. Following the reconstruction of the Washington Road railroad bridge in 1939, the business center of the community shifted to the intersection of Washington Road and Cranbury Road, where a lumber yard, service station, liquor store, strip mall, several gas stations, and several more businesses operated for decades.

Following World War II, the Princeton Junction population grew with the construction of residential developments such as Sherbrooke Estates, Windsor Chase, and Wellington Estates.

Princeton Junction is currently the proposed site of a "transit village" to be built northwest of the train station.

In October 2019, the Historical Society of West Windsor published an online museum exploring the history of West Windsor - including that of Princeton Junction.

== Geography ==
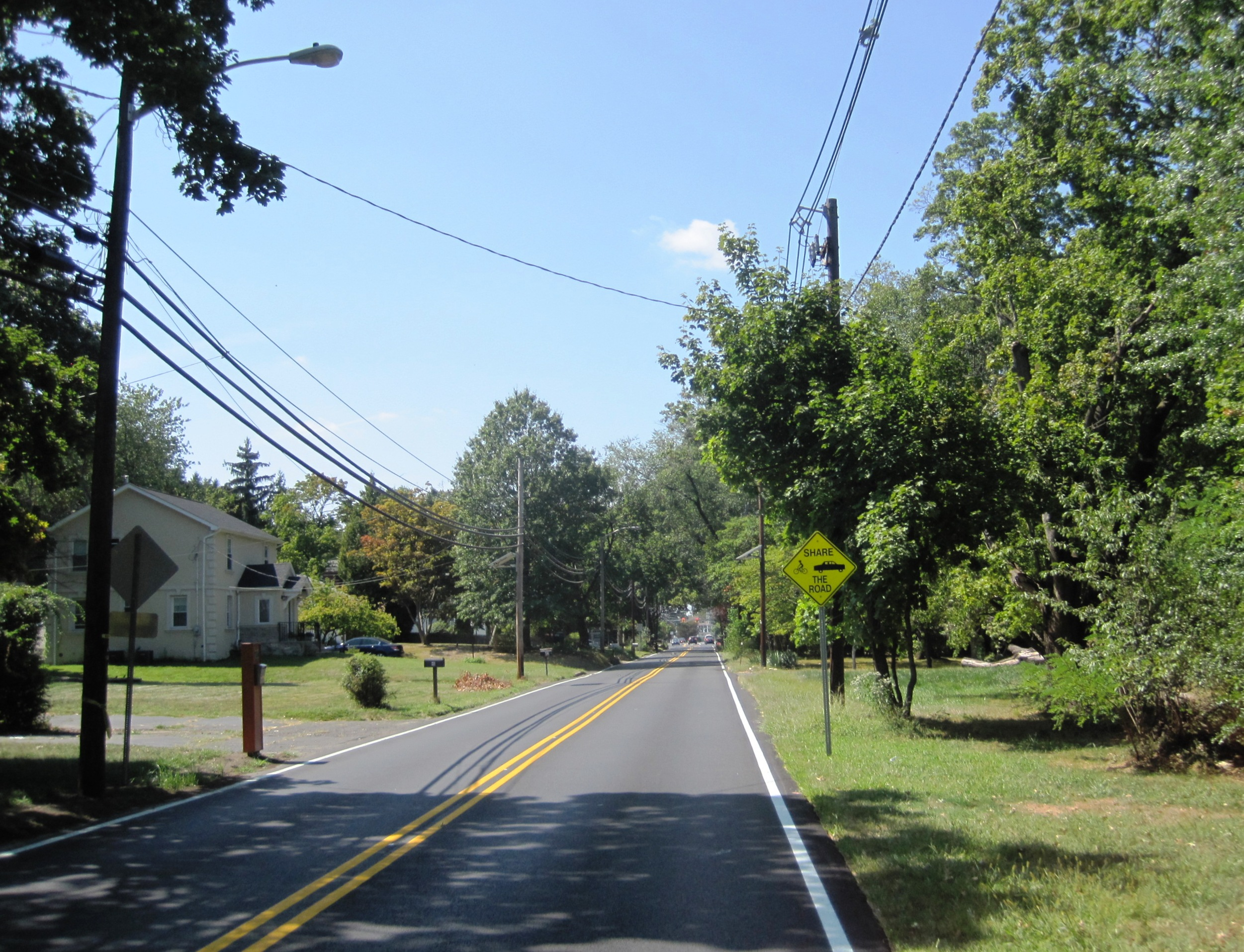
Typical neighborhood in Princeton Junction, photo taken along Cranbury Road (County Route 615)

Princeton Junction is in eastern Mercer County, in the northern part of West Windsor Township. The northeastern boundary of the community is the Millstone River, across which is Plainsboro Township in Middlesex County. Bear Brook, a tributary of the Millstone, forms the eastern border of Princeton Junction, and the CDP extends north as far as U.S. Route 1. Trenton, the state capital, is 11 miles (18 km) to the southwest, the borough of Princeton is 4 miles (6 km) to the northwest, and New Brunswick is 16 miles (26 km) to the northeast. Part of the Berrien City development is in the southwest corner of the CDP.

Princeton Junction's name comes from the train station of the same name, now on the Amtrak and New Jersey Transit Northeast Corridor. The station is the junction between this main line and a spur served by the "Dinky" train, run by New Jersey Transit, to Princeton itself.

According to the United States Census Bureau, the Princeton Junction CDP has a total area of 1.855 square miles (4.804 km^{2}), including 1.823 square miles (4.722 km^{2}) of land and 0.032 square miles (0.083 km^{2}) of water (1.72%).

== Demographics ==
Historical population
Census	Pop.	Note	%±
1980	2,419		—
1990	2,362		−2.4%
2000	2,382		0.8%
2010	2,465		3.5%
2020	2,475		0.4%
Population sources: 1950 1960 1970; 1980 1990 2000; 2010 2020

Princeton Junction first appeared as a census designated place in the 1980 U.S. census.

=== Racial and ethnic composition ===
Princeton Junction CDP, New Jersey – Racial and ethnic composition Note: the US Census treats Hispanic/Latino as an ethnic category. This table excludes Latinos from the racial categories and assigns them to a separate category. Hispanics/Latinos may be of any race.
Race / Ethnicity (NH = Non-Hispanic)	Pop 2000	Pop 2010	Pop 2020	% 2000	% 2010	% 2020
White alone (NH)	2,017	1,761	1,451	84.68%	71.44%	58.63%
Black or African American alone (NH)	48	58	47	2.02%	2.35%	1.90%
Native American or Alaska Native alone (NH)	3	0	0	0.13%	0.00%	0.00%
Asian alone (NH)	211	454	693	8.86%	18.42%	28.00%
Native Hawaiian or Pacific Islander alone (NH)	0	0	0	0.00%	0.00%	0.00%
Other race alone (NH)	3	8	19	0.13%	0.32%	0.77%
Mixed race or Multiracial (NH)	27	50	111	1.13%	2.03%	4.48%
Hispanic or Latino (any race)	73	134	154	3.06%	5.44%	6.22%
Total	2,382	2,465	2,475	100.00%	100.00%	100.00%

=== 2020 census ===
As of the 2020 census, Princeton Junction had a population of 2,475. The median age was 41.8 years. 24.1% of residents were under the age of 18 and 18.4% were 65 years of age or older. For every 100 females, there were 99.1 males, and for every 100 females age 18 and over, there were 94.7 males.

90.3% of residents lived in urban areas and 9.7% lived in rural areas.

There were 913 households in Princeton Junction, of which 38.2% had children under the age of 18 living in them. Of all households, 64.4% were married-couple households, 12.3% were households with a male householder and no spouse or partner present, and 19.2% were households with a female householder and no spouse or partner present. About 17.1% of all households were made up of individuals, and 9.6% had someone living alone who was 65 years of age or older.

There were 952 housing units, of which 4.1% were vacant. The homeowner vacancy rate was 2.2% and the rental vacancy rate was 1.6%.

=== 2010 census ===
The 2010 United States census counted 2,465 people, 921 households, and 696 families in the CDP. The population density was 1,349.8 people per square mile (521.2 people/km^{2}). There were 940 housing units at an average density of 514.7 units per square mile (198.7 units/km^{2}). The racial makeup was 74.81% (1,844) White, 2.43% (60) Black or African American, 0.16% (4) Native American, 18.62% (459) Asian, 0.00% (0) Pacific Islander, 1.42% (35) from other races, and 2.56% (63) from two or more races. Hispanic or Latino of any race were 5.44% (134) of the population.

Of the 921 households, 35.0% had children under the age of 18; 68.6% were married couples living together; 5.4% had a female householder with no husband present and 24.4% were non-families. Of all households, 20.8% were made up of individuals and 11.5% had someone living alone who was 65 years of age or older. The average household size was 2.66 and the average family size was 3.08.

25.0% of the population were under the age of 18, 4.6% from 18 to 24, 23.0% from 25 to 44, 30.6% from 45 to 64, and 16.8% who were 65 years of age or older. The median age was 43.3 years. For every 100 females, the population had 95.3 males. For every 100 females ages 18 and older there were 90.2 males.

=== 2000 census ===
As of the 2000 United States census there were 2,382 people, 842 households, and 681 families living in the CDP. The population density was 491.8 people/km^{2} (1,274 people/mi^{2}). There were 858 housing units at an average density of 177.2 units/km^{2} (459 units/mi^{2}). The racial makeup of the CDP was 86.99% White, 2.02% African American, 0.13% Native American, 8.86% Asian, 0.76% from other races, and 1.26% from two or more races. Hispanic or Latino of any race were 3.06% of the population.

There were 842 households, out of which 41.7% had children under the age of 18 living with them, 71.0% were married couples living together, 7.4% had a female householder with no husband present, and 19.1% were non-families. 15.6% of all households were made up of individuals, and 5.8% had someone living alone who was 65 years of age or older. The average household size was 2.82 and the average family size was 3.14.

In the CDP the population was spread out, with 28.3% under the age of 18, 4.0% from 18 to 24, 27.8% from 25 to 44, 28.9% from 45 to 64, and 11.0% who were 65 years of age or older. The median age was 40 years. For every 100 females, there were 99.2 males. For every 100 females age 18 and over, there were 98.4 males.

The median income for a household in the CDP was $116,668, and the median income for a family was $127,617. Males had a median income of $100,000 versus $58,750 for females. The per capita income for the CDP was $44,113. None of the families and 1.5% of the population were living below the poverty line, including no under eighteens and 5.3% of those over 64.

== Business and industry ==
The turn of the millennium saw the closure of Lick-It ice cream, a tiny kiosk-like yellow building that served ice cream to walk-in and drive-through customers, always including a trademark nonpareil in the ice cream. The site is now occupied by PNC Bank opened in 2006.

In 2009, Princeton Junction saw the closure of an Acme Supermarket, which had been an anchor tenant in the Windsor Plaza Shopping Center for nearly 40 years; the 33,000-square-foot (3,100 m^{2}) store closed in the face of the opening of larger and more modern supermarkets nearby.

Some residents blame the "deterioration" of the central Princeton Junction area on a lack of political consensus.

== Education ==
All of West Windsor, including Princeton Junction, is served by the West Windsor-Plainsboro Regional School District.

== Notable people ==
People who were born in, residents of, or otherwise closely associated with Princeton Junction include:

- Kevin Barry (born 1978), baseball player
- Douglas Forrester (born 1953), former gubernatorial candidate
- Ethan Hawke (born 1970), actor
- Matt Lalli (born 1986), professional lacrosse player for the Boston Cannons of Major League Lacrosse
- Ben H. Love (1930–2010), eighth Chief Scout Executive of the Boy Scouts of America, serving from 1985 to 1993
- James Murphy (born 1970), singer, songwriter, DJ, electronic musician (as LCD Soundsystem)
- John Forbes Nash Jr. (1928–2015), mathematician
- Bryan Singer (born 1965), film director, writer and producer

Note

- Christopher McQuarrie (born 1968), screenwriter, was born either in Princeton Junction, where he was raised, or in nearby Princeton. Different sources — and in the case of All Movie Guide, the same source — give both places. Note that Princeton Junction has no hospital.
