= Penns Neck =

Penns Neck or Penn's Neck may refer to:

- Penns Neck, New Jersey, an unincorporated community in Mercer County, New Jersey
  - Penns Neck Baptist Church
- Penns Neck (cape), a cape on the Delaware River in Salem County, New Jersey
- Penn's Neck Township, New Jersey, former township in Salem County, New Jersey
  - Lower Penns Neck, New Jersey, now Pennsville Township
  - Upper Penns Neck, New Jersey, now Carneys Point Township

== See also ==
- Churchtown, New Jersey, also known as Penns Neck, Salem County, New Jersey
