= Penns Neck Cemetery =

1730s/40s historic cemetery

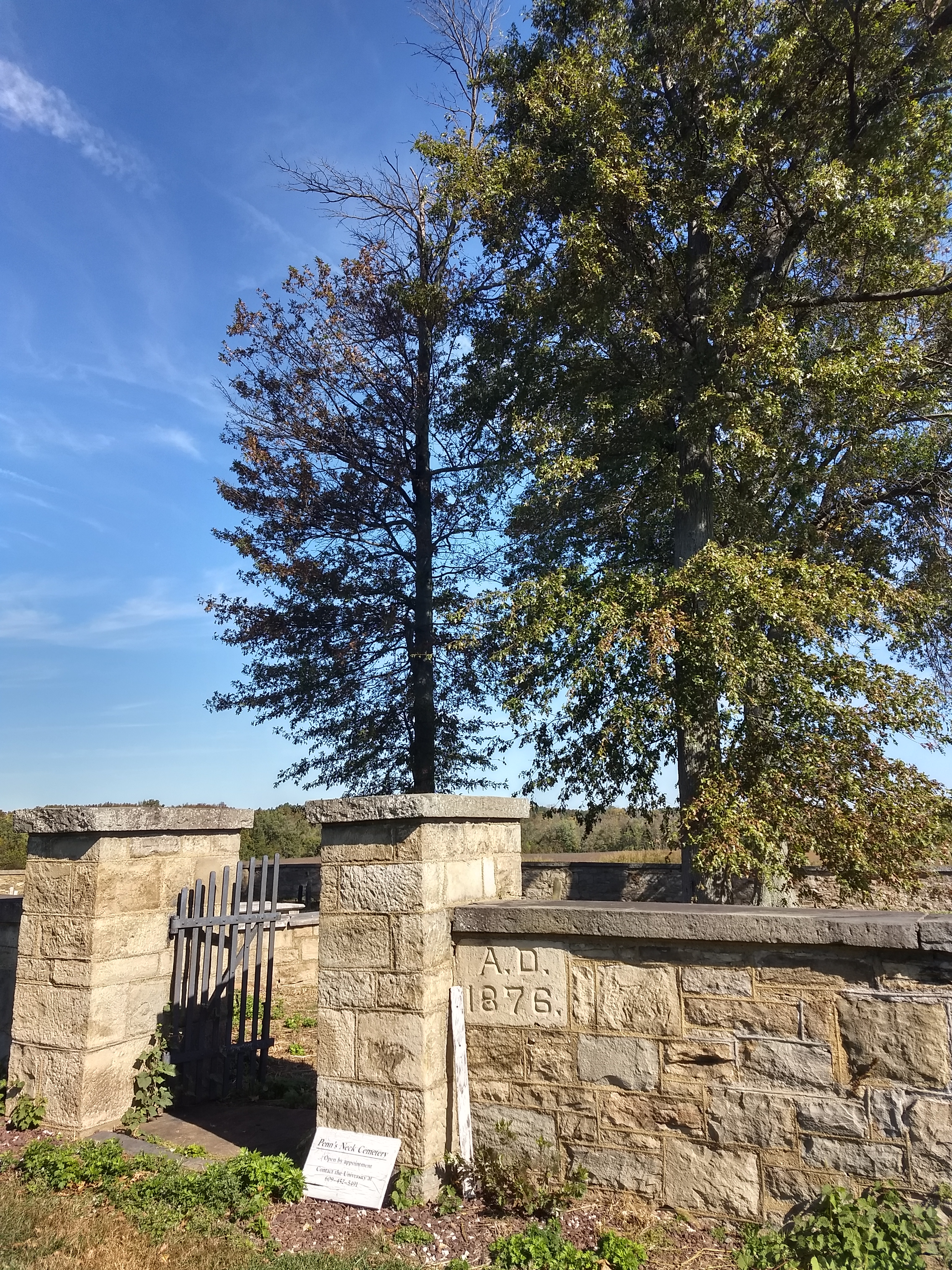
- Entrance to Penns Neck Cemetery, 2019
- Interactive map of Penns Neck Cemetery

Details
- Established: 1737–1746
- Abandoned: Yes
- Location: West Windsor, New Jersey
- Country: United States
- Coordinates: 40°20′13″N 74°38′21″W
- Type: Family
- Owned by: Penns Neck Cemetery Association (defunct)
- Size: 0.19 acres (0.077 ha)
- No. of graves: 80 to 100
- Find a Grave: Penns Neck Cemetery

The Penns Neck Cemetery, also commonly called the Schenck-Covenhoven Cemetery or the Old Conover Graveyard, is a 1730s/40s defunct burial plot within West Windsor, New Jersey.

The cemetery is now surrounded by the "West Windsor Meadows Neighborhood" campus, which opened in 2024. Although this campus is owned by Princeton University, the cemetery is not, and its last owner was the Penns Neck Cemetery Association, which is believed to have been dissolved at some point in the early 20th century, leaving the cemetery "orphaned".

The cemetery is currently maintained by the University and the congregation of the Princeton Baptist Church of Penns Neck.

== Status ==
The cemetery has been deemed "eligible" for the National Register of Historic Places by the New Jersey State Historic Preservation Office since 1997. It is one of New Jersey's oldest extant colonial burial grounds and almost all of its stones date from the mid-1700s until the late 1800s. Its oldest legible gravestone dates from 1746, and the only exception is one burial in 1941.

The cemetery is also one of West Windsor's earliest surviving colonial sites, containing the interments of several Township founders, some early area settlers, and possibly a few American Revolutionary War soldiers. It was historically used by residents of the nearby 18th-century community of Penns Neck.

Since the 1880s, several surveys have been made of the cemetery's contents, which currently include 80 to 100 burials, marked by around 130 headstones, footstones, and vaults. The gravestones are composed of several different materials, including sandstone, marble, and slate. While some are quite legible, others are cracked, broken, flaking, or even missing altogether. A handful of missing stones are identified in older surveys, but do not show up in more recent surveys.

== History ==
=== Origins ===
In 1693, William Penn acquired over six thousand acres of land in the area as an investment; however, it is unknown whether he or his family actually visited this territory. In 1737, John Van Couwenhoven and Garret Schenck, both from Monmouth County, purchased the land from Penn's sons; they too are not confirmed to have ever actually lived on the site. Instead, starting in 1737, by which point the territory was known as "Penns Neck", they divided up the tract into distinct parcels and deeded it to their descendants. The cemetery was built in the 1730s or 1740s, bisected by the property line dividing two of these parcels.

Throughout the 1700s, these children, grandchildren, and others deforested the landscape and cultivated large farms throughout the "Penns Neck" tract. Also in this century, other families settled in the area, establishing the "Penns Neck" neighborhood. Many are represented in the cemetery's tombstones, including members of the Cruser, Dye, Stout, Martin, Oppie, Van Dyke, and other families. As the decades passed, the "Penns Neck" community expanded, and this cemetery – the only one for several miles in any direction – grew with it.

=== Ownership succession ===
In 1812 and 1813, two deeds split the cemetery off from the surrounding land as a separate tract. Over the next several decades, it was largely held privately by the Schenck family, although other families were still permitted to bury their dead here. However, after a succession of generations, the Penns Neck community decided to ensure that its preservation would not be wholly dependent on familial succession. Thus in 1877 they formed a corporation known as the "Penns Neck Cemetery Association."

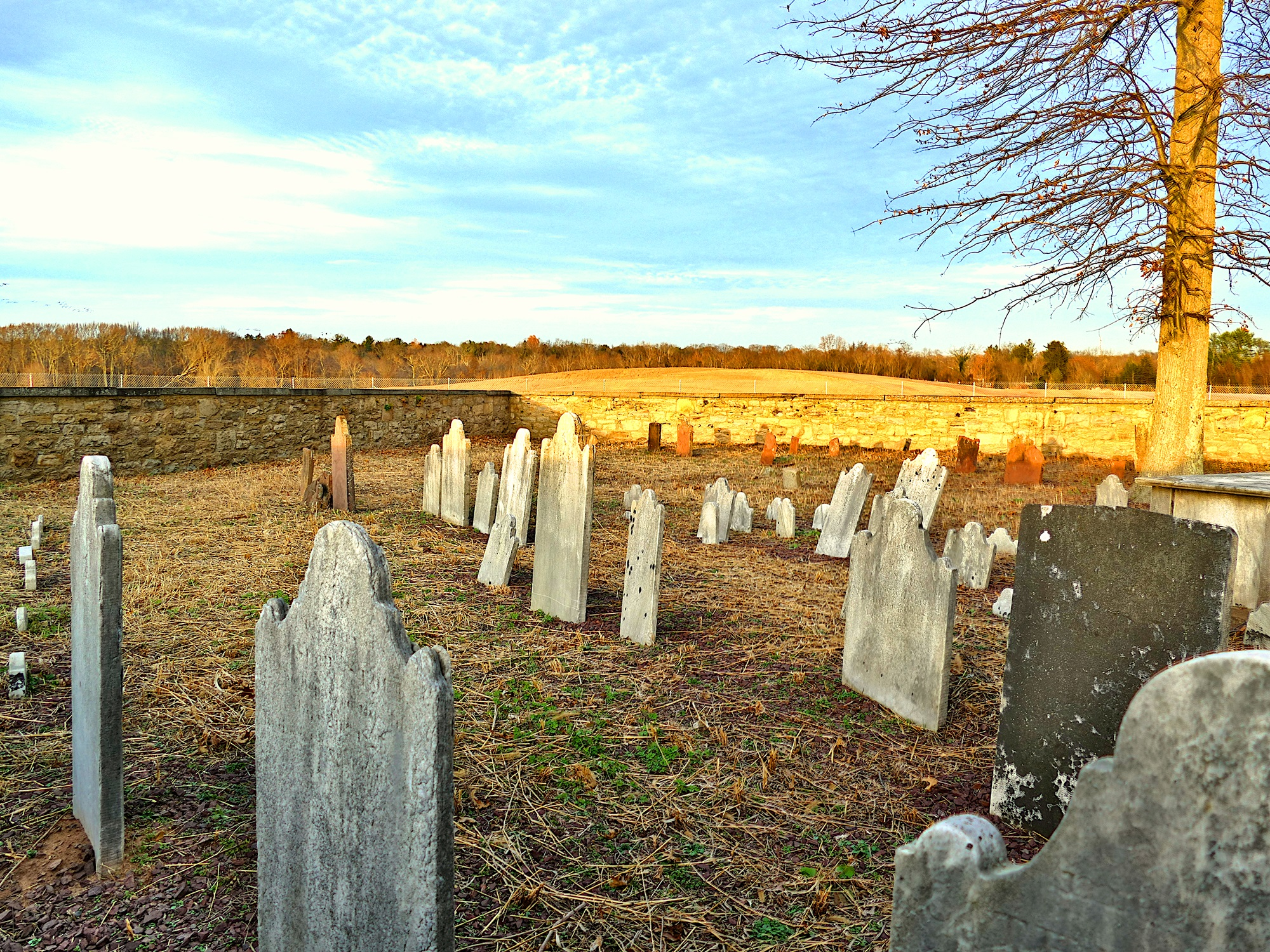
The cemetery in January 2022. Dirt mounds created during the construction by Princeton University are visible in the background.

The previous year, one of the Association's members, Eliza Tilton, had donated $500 for the cemetery's upkeep, and funded the construction of the surrounding fieldstone wall. This wall is oriented at about 45 degrees to most of the graves, because while the graves – the large majority of which predate the wall – were laid out east-to-west, the wall was instead oriented parallel to Route 1 in the southwest-northeast direction, and Washington Road in the southeast-northwest direction.

Clarissa Schneck became the last individual owner of the cemetery when she formally transferred its ownership to the Penns Neck Cemetery Association in 1878. Few records remain that would otherwise provide insight into the Association's actions over the years. Although it is also unknown for how long the Association operated, none of its original members survived until the 1930s, and few community members had stepped up to take their place, rendering the Association effectively non-existent and the cemetery legally "abandoned" from that point onward.

=== Subsequent caretakers ===
In 1941, the last burial occurred in the cemetery, for Sarah Eleanor Martin. In the same decade, Princeton University purchased hundreds of acres of land surrounding the site, but not the cemetery itself, which remained a separate tract. The land around remained farmed for the next several decades. However, with apparently few, if any, locals caring for it, the cemetery slowly degraded over this same period, as weeds and trees grew and stones eroded and broke. In 1969, the Historical Society of Princeton formed a committee to restore the cemetery. Indeed, seven years later a significant community effort cleared weeds and repaired stonework, but future maintenance efforts were infrequent before 1993, when the Historical Society of Princeton bequeathed stewardship responsibilities to the Princeton Baptist Church of Penns Neck. The church has acted as its informal caretaker ever since, performing period maintenance alongside Princeton University.

The cemetery was deemed "eligible" for the National Register of Historic Places by the New Jersey State Historic Preservation Office in 1997. However, full placement on the Register has not yet occurred. Princeton University has begun using its land in the surrounding area, starting construction of its "Lake Campus" in 2021, later renamed the West Windsor Meadows Neighborhood. All of the surrounding farmland has since been replaced with sports facilities, graduate student housing, grass and wildflower fields, a parking garage, and other institutions. The cemetery is currently in the middle of grass fields used as a cross-country course, and remains periodically cleared of weeds.
