= Berrien City, New Jersey =

Populated place in Mercer County, New Jersey, US

- Unincorporated community
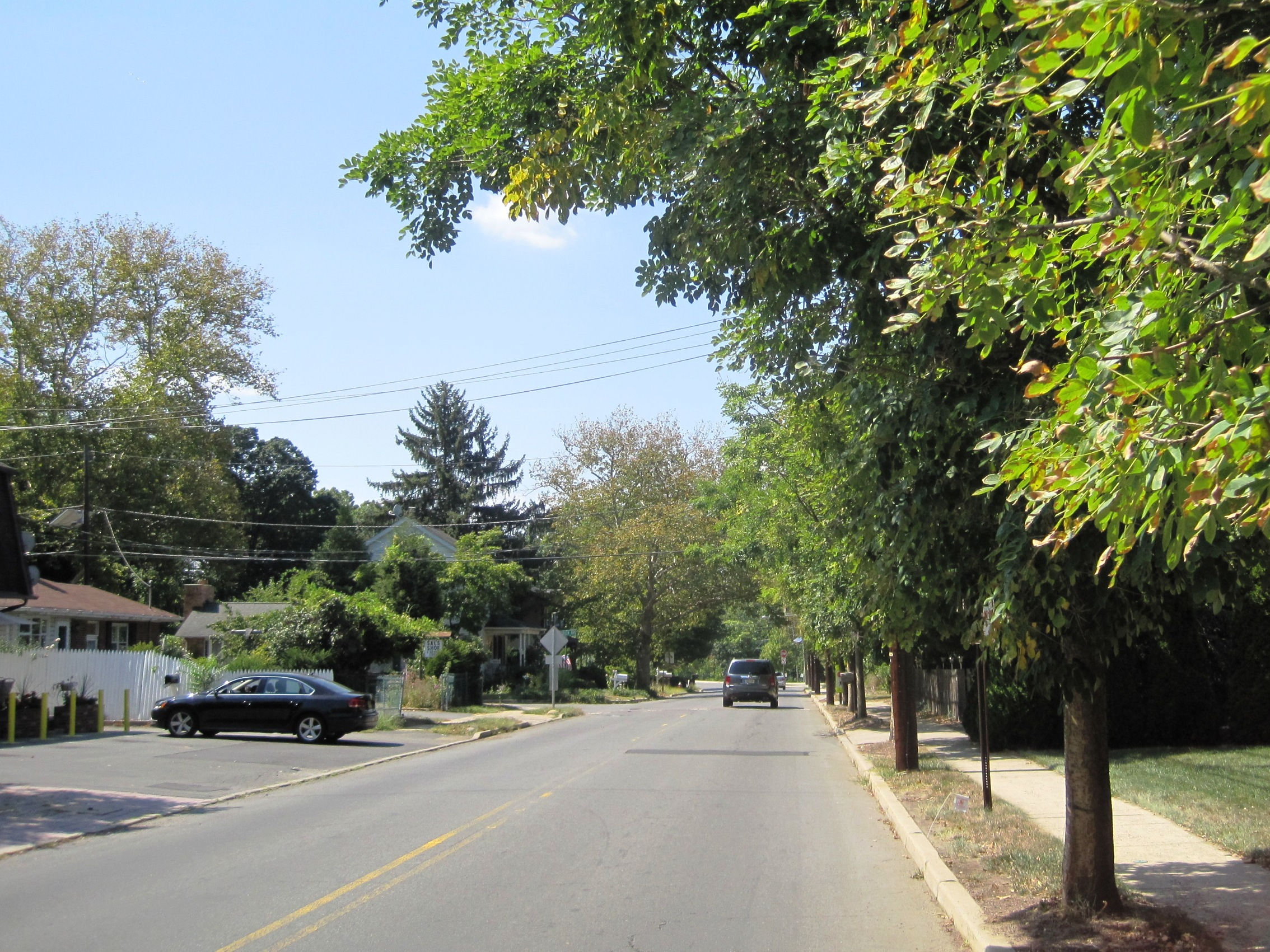
- Looking down Alexander Road

- Location within Mercer County, New Jersey Location within New Jersey Location within the United States
- Coordinates: 40°18′46″N 74°37′30″W
- Country: United States
- State: New Jersey
- County: Mercer
- Township: West Windsor

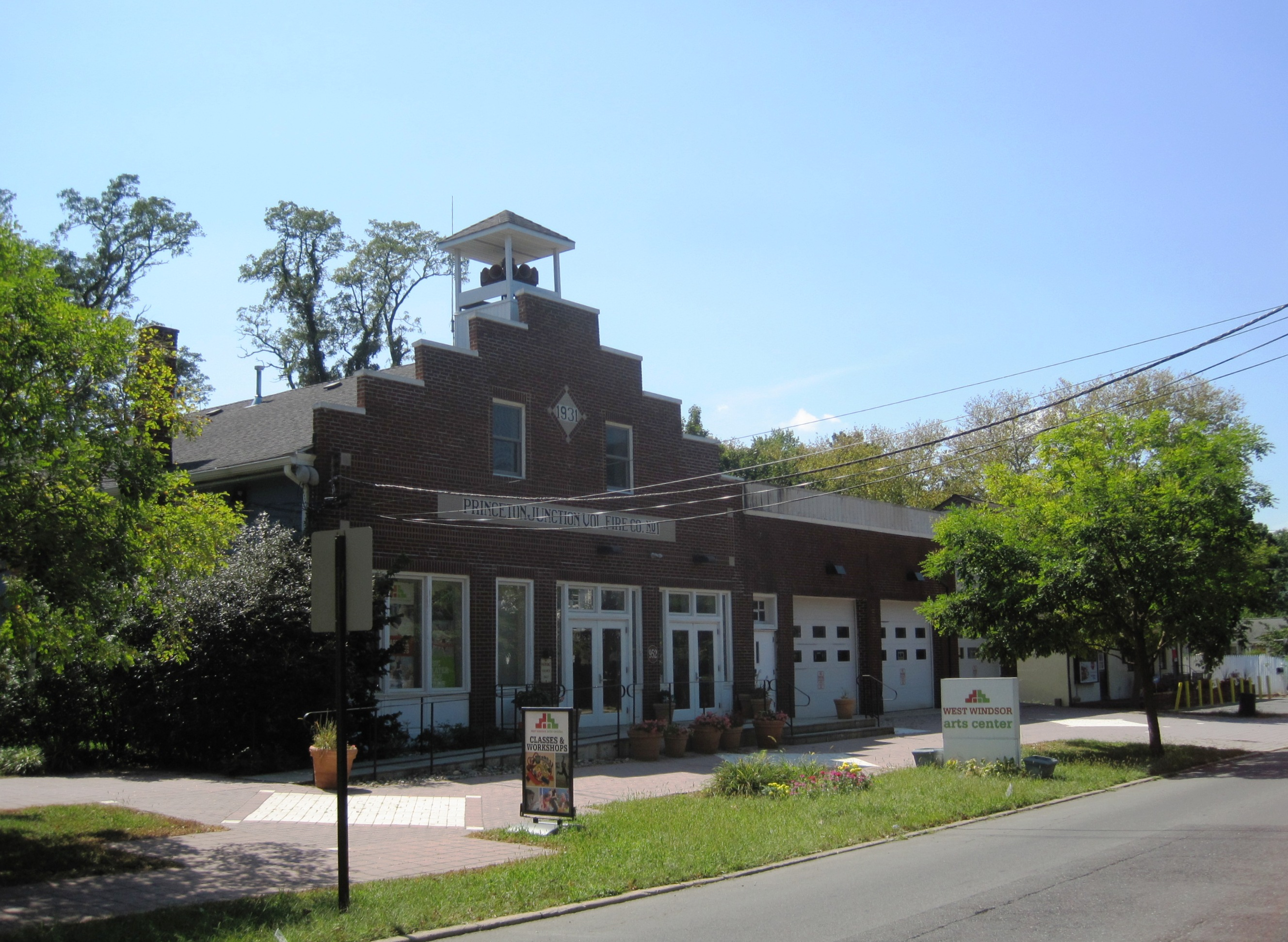
West Windsor Arts Center building, formerly the Princeton Junction Fire Company #1

Berrien City, also known simply as Berrien, is an unincorporated community located within West Windsor in Mercer County, in the U.S. state of New Jersey. The neighborhood is located within the Princeton Junction census designated place centered about the intersection of Alexander Road and Scott Avenue, located within walking distance of the Princeton Junction train station and Princeton-Hightstown Road (County Route 571).

Berrien City was West Windsor's first planned development. Historically, it expanded in three major stages in the 1910s-20s. First was Scott Montgomery Berrien's "Berrien Heights" starting in 1916, consisting of 72 lots of uniform size surrounding Berrien Avenue and Montgomery Street. In 1924, his son - Alexander Lawrence Berrien - presented plans for an additional 42 lots, which, along with the 72 original lots, was called "Berrien City." These plans also introduced more roads: Lillie Street, Scott Avenue, and Emil Street, which were, respectively, named after his sister, father, and brother-in-law. Finally, in 1926, Michael McLaughlin, a real-estate developer, introduced "Princeton Gardens," consisting of 201 lots on both sides of the nearby Northeast Corridor railroad tracks. Only a portion of these lots were developed, all on the southeast side of the tracks. Princeton Gardens also incorporated a final street: Borosko Place, named after a local Hungarian family. Over time, all three developments - Berrien Heights, Berrien City, and Princeton Gardens - became collectively known as "Berrien City."

In 1926, the community incorporated the "Berrien City Fire Company" - now the Princeton Junction Volunteer Fire Co. Its firehouse opened in 1931 at 952 Alexander Road. During World War II this building served as a civil defense station, and - briefly - a post office. In 2010, the building became the West Windsor Arts Center, managed by the West Windsor Arts Council.

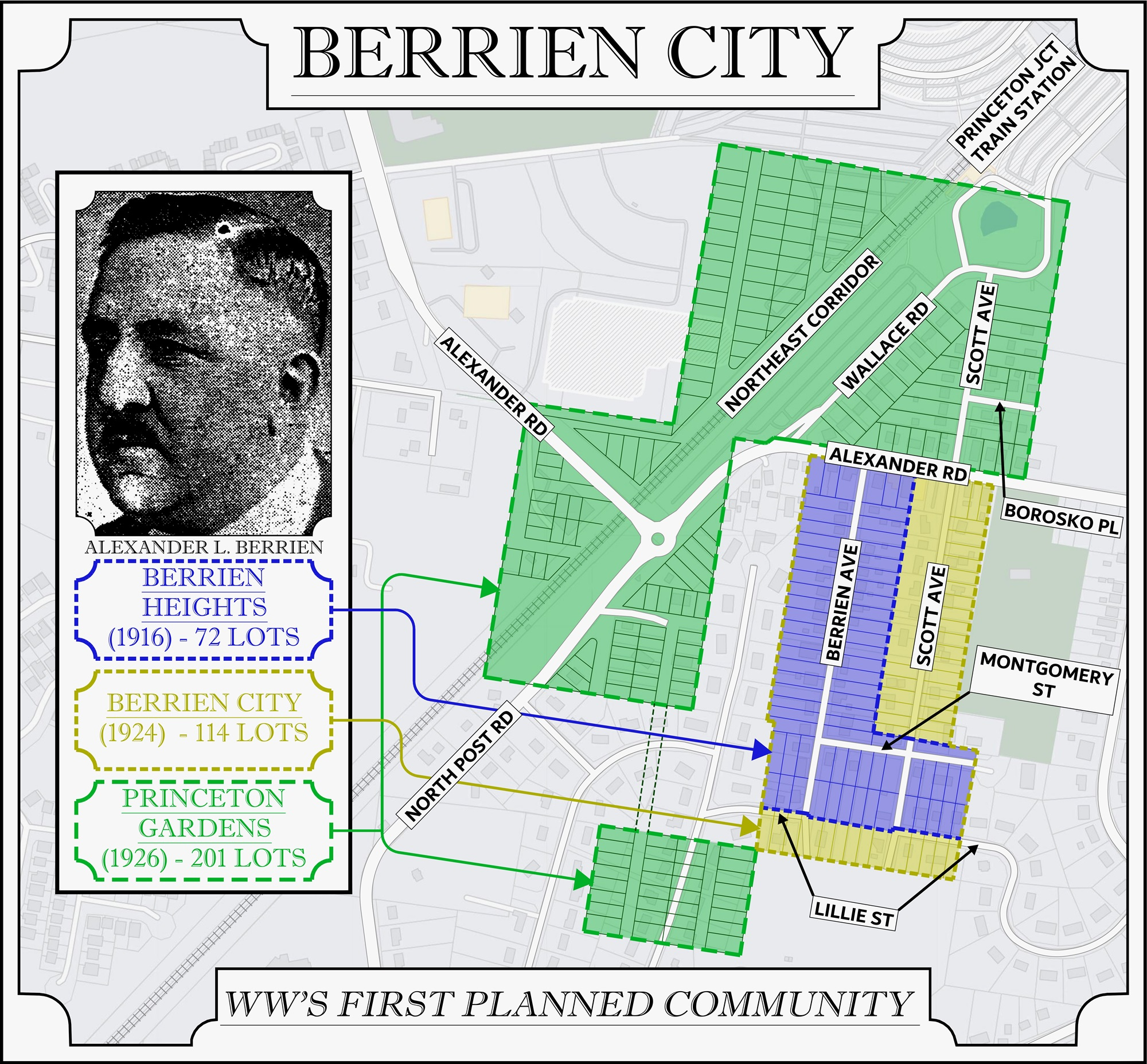
Map of the original planned lots of Berrien Heights, Berrien City, and Princeton Gardens. Including a photo of Alexander L. Berrien.

Early homeowners in Berrien City often bought empty lots and constructed houses of their own, often with the help of neighbors and sometimes with kits provided by Sears, Roebuck, and Weyerhauser. Some homes still incorporate leftover materials from the Pennsylvania Railroad.

A number of families operated businesses out of their homes. "Howard's Luncheonette" set up shop at 948 Alexander Road in the 1950s, replacing an older general store. From the 1940s-1970s, the Princeton Junction post office was in this building as well. It was later replaced by an Italian eatery called Galletta's Galley, then Brother's Pizza in the late 1980s or early 1990s. Next door is Sal's Shoe Repair Shop, a longtime cobbler.

From the 1970s until 2015, Nobel Prize and Abel Prize laureate John Forbes Nash Jr. lived in Berrien City. Actor Ethan Hawke also lived here for some time in the 1980s while attending West Windsor-Plainsboro High School South.

In 2019, the Historical Society of West Windsor published a website documenting West Windsor Township's history, including that of Berrien City.
