= Penns Neck, New Jersey =

Populated place in Mercer County, New Jersey, US

- Unincorporated community
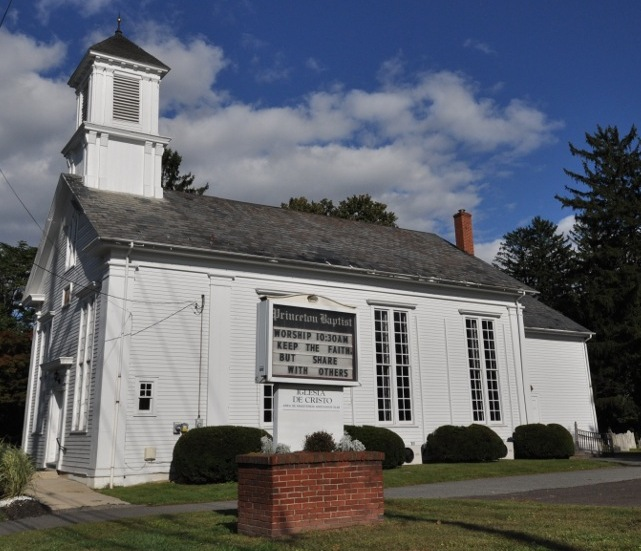
- The historic Penns Neck Baptist Church.

- Location within Mercer County, New Jersey Location within New Jersey Location within the United States
- Coordinates: 40°19′56″N 74°38′13″W
- Country: United States
- State: New Jersey
- County: Mercer
- Township: West Windsor
- Elevation: 98 ft (30 m)
- GNIS feature ID: 879214

Penns Neck is an unincorporated community located within West Windsor Township in Mercer County, in the U.S. state of New Jersey. The community developed at the intersection of the Trenton-New Brunswick Turnpike (now U.S. Route 1) and Washington Road. The Penns Neck Circle and the historic Penns Neck Baptist Church (1812) are both located in Penns Neck. The Princeton Branch rail line, known as the Dinky, has run through the area since 1865, and stopped at Penns Neck station until January 1971.

== History ==
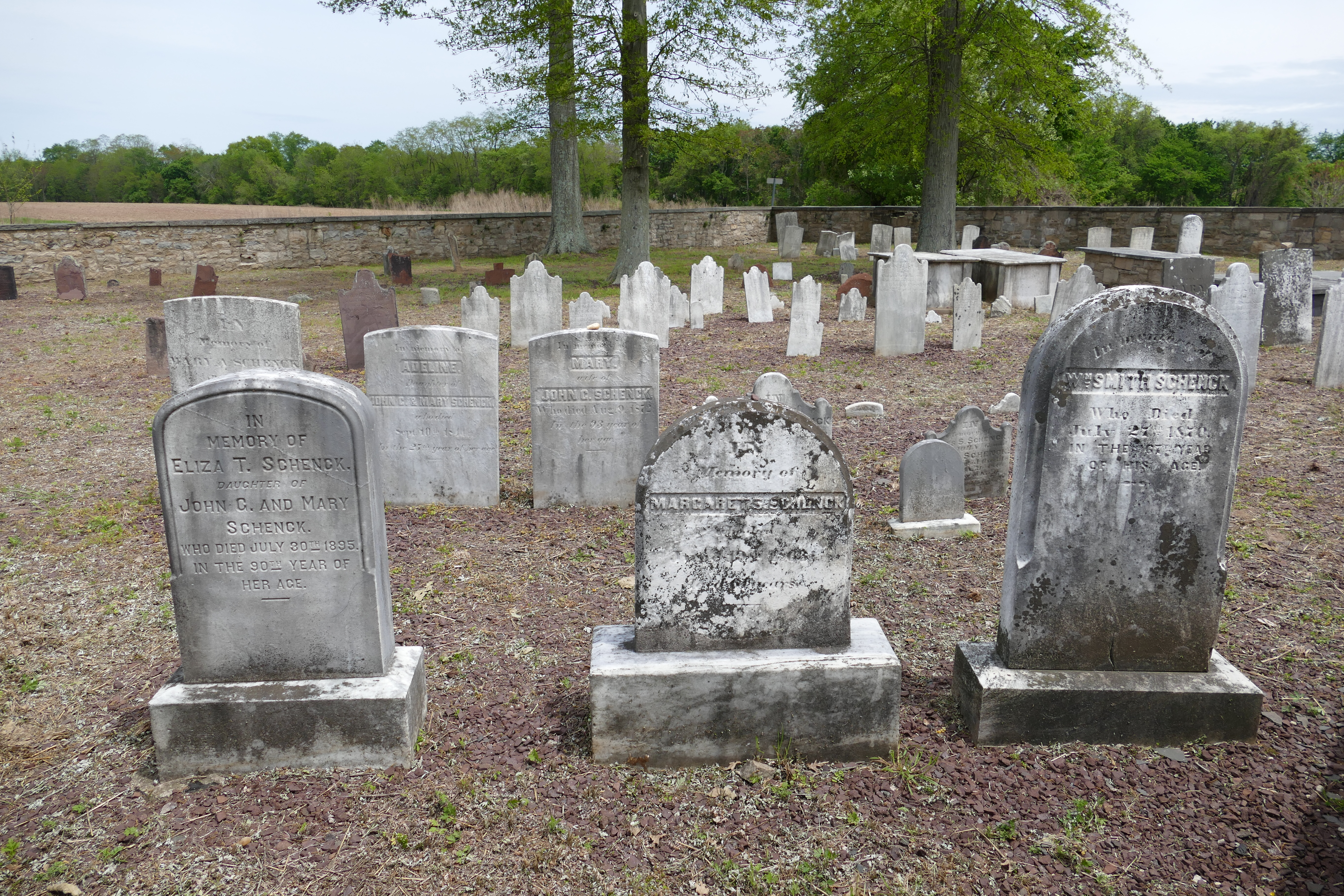
The Penns Neck-based Schenck-Covenhoven cemetery, housing individuals from West Windsor's first wave of settlement (1737)

The 6500-acre tract of land that would become Penns Neck was initially purchased from the East Jersey Board of Proprietors by William Penn, Quaker founder of Pennsylvania. In 1737, concurrent to the settlement of Dutch Neck, Garret Schenck 7 John Covenhoven purchased the land from Penn's sons. That same year is the first year that the name "Penns Neck" (named after Penn) appears - alongside an alternate name, "Williamsborough." Soon after, the area - bordered by the Stony Brook to the west, the Millstone River to the north, the Assunpink Creek to the south, and Penn Lyle Road to the east - became settled by the Schenck and Covenhoven families.

In the late 1730s/1740s, the Schenck-Covenhoven cemetery was constructed to house the settlers' dead. Following the chartering of Brunswick Pike (Route 1) in 1804 and its completion in 1807, the community began to flourish, seeing the construction of the Red Lion Inn. In 1812, the Princeton Baptist Church (AKA the Penns Neck Baptist Church) was erected, helping to center the intersection of Route 1 and Washington Road as the geographical and historical heart of the community.

In October 2019, the Historical Society of West Windsor published an online museum exploring the history of West Windsor - including Penns Neck.
