= Edinburg, New Jersey =

Populated place in Middlesex County, New Jersey, US

- Unincorporated community
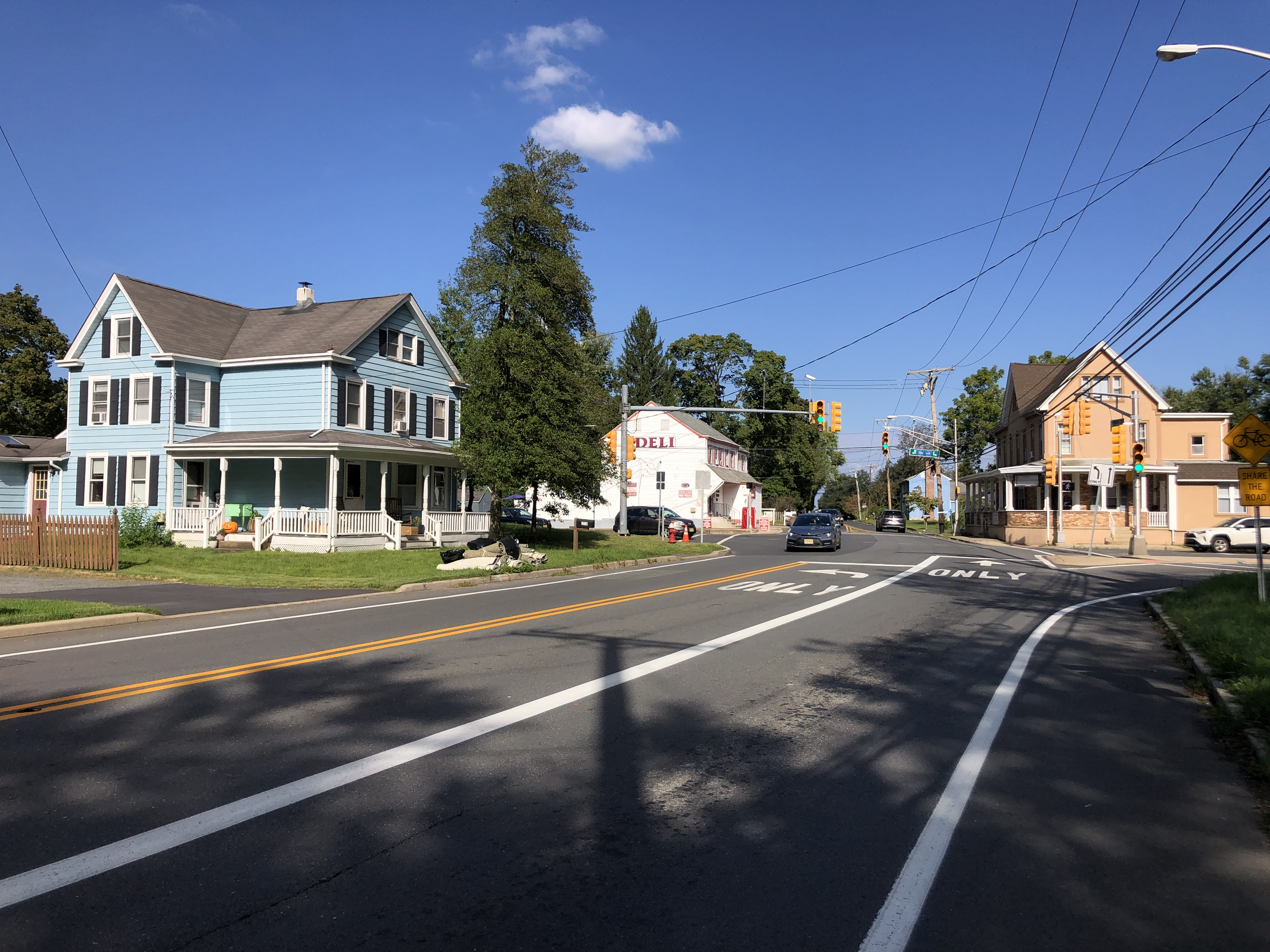
- Center of Edinburg

- Location within Mercer County, New Jersey Location within New Jersey Location within the United States
- Coordinates: 40°15′29″N 74°36′58″W
- Country: United States
- State: New Jersey
- County: Mercer
- Township: West Windsor
- Elevation: 72 ft (22 m)
- GNIS feature ID: 876107

Edinburg is a 1700s-era unincorporated community located within West Windsor in Mercer County, in the U.S. state of New Jersey. The community is located at the junction of Old Trenton Road (County Routes 526 and CR 535), Edinburg Road (CR 526), and Windsor Road (CR 641).

== History ==
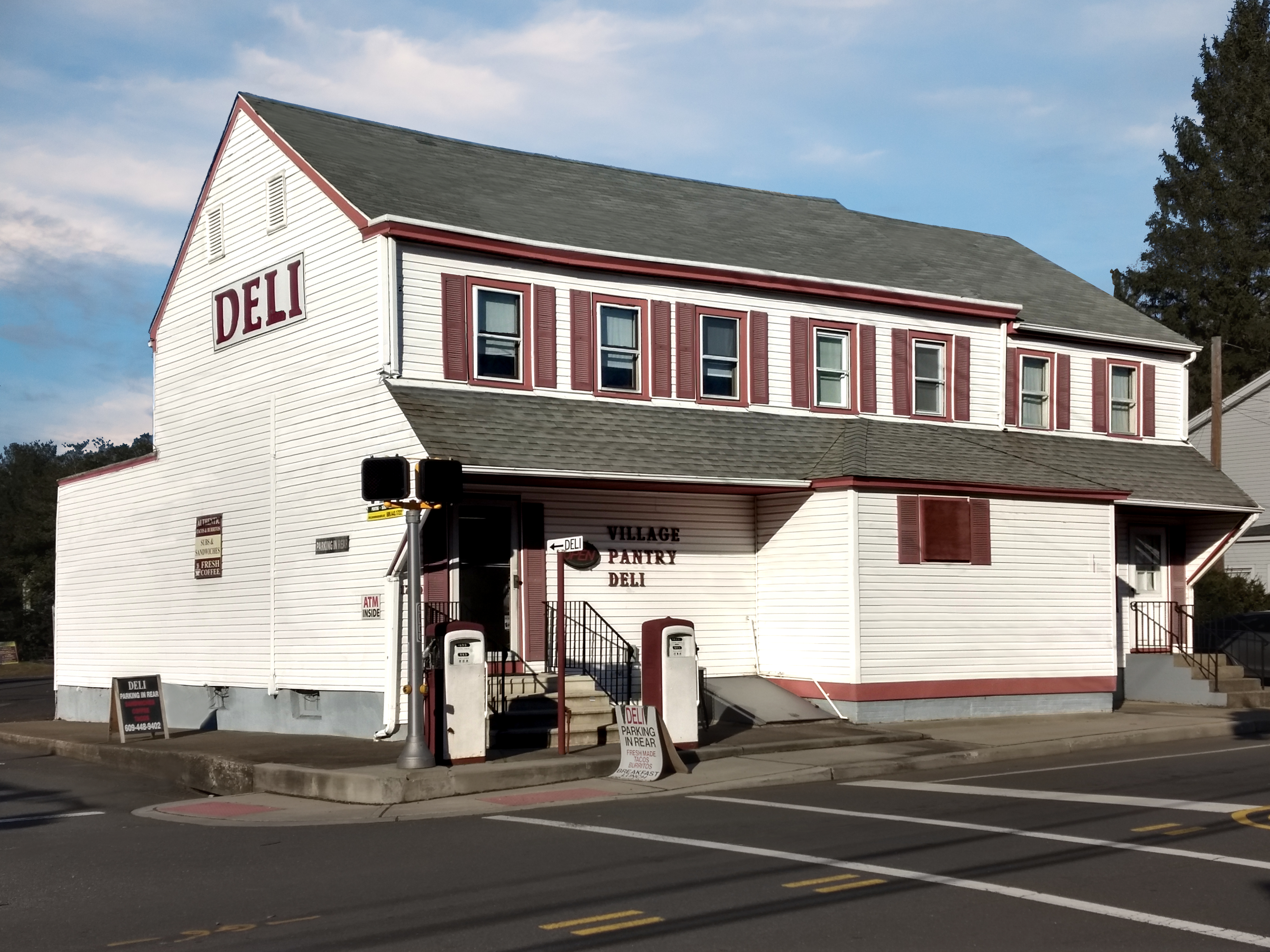
The Edinburg general store, a staple of the hamlet since circa 1816.

Edinburg developed in the mid-1700s as a stagecoach stop. The area was originally called "Assanpink," after the nearby Assunpink Creek and the Lenape of Native Americans of the same name that lived in the area. Numerous Lenape artifacts have been discovered in Edinburg over the centuries, suggesting that the Lenape may have once had a settlement here. In 1703, two Lenape - Hapohucquona and Tolomhon - sold hundreds of acres directly south of the Assunpink Creek, in the Edinburg area, to one of the area's first European colonial landowners: David Lyell. Lyell, in turn, sold much of his tract to the area's first colonial settlers.

These early families included the Mounts, Tindalls, Rogers, Hutchinsons, Cubberlys, Grooms, Conovers, Robins, and Hoopers. Around the mid-1800s, they changed the area's name to "Edinburg," reputedly to honor a popular Scottish local.

"Hooper's Tavern" was a popular local hotel that hosted township meetings in the mid-1700s. In later years, Edinburg featured a schoolhouse, hotels, general stores, a post office, blacksmith, foundry, distillery, cider mill, broom factory, wheelwright, cooper, shoemaker, tanyard, basket factories, and more.

In the 1970s and beyond, much of the surrounding farmland was replaced by Mercer County Park, Mercer County Community College, and suburban developments. However, Edinburg still retains some of its original farmland and the broader landscape features a few dozen houses that are 100 years old or older.

In October 2019, the Historical Society of West Windsor published an online museum exploring the history of West Windsor- including that of Edinburg.
