= Grovers Mill, New Jersey =

Populated place in Mercer County, New Jersey, US

- Unincorporated community
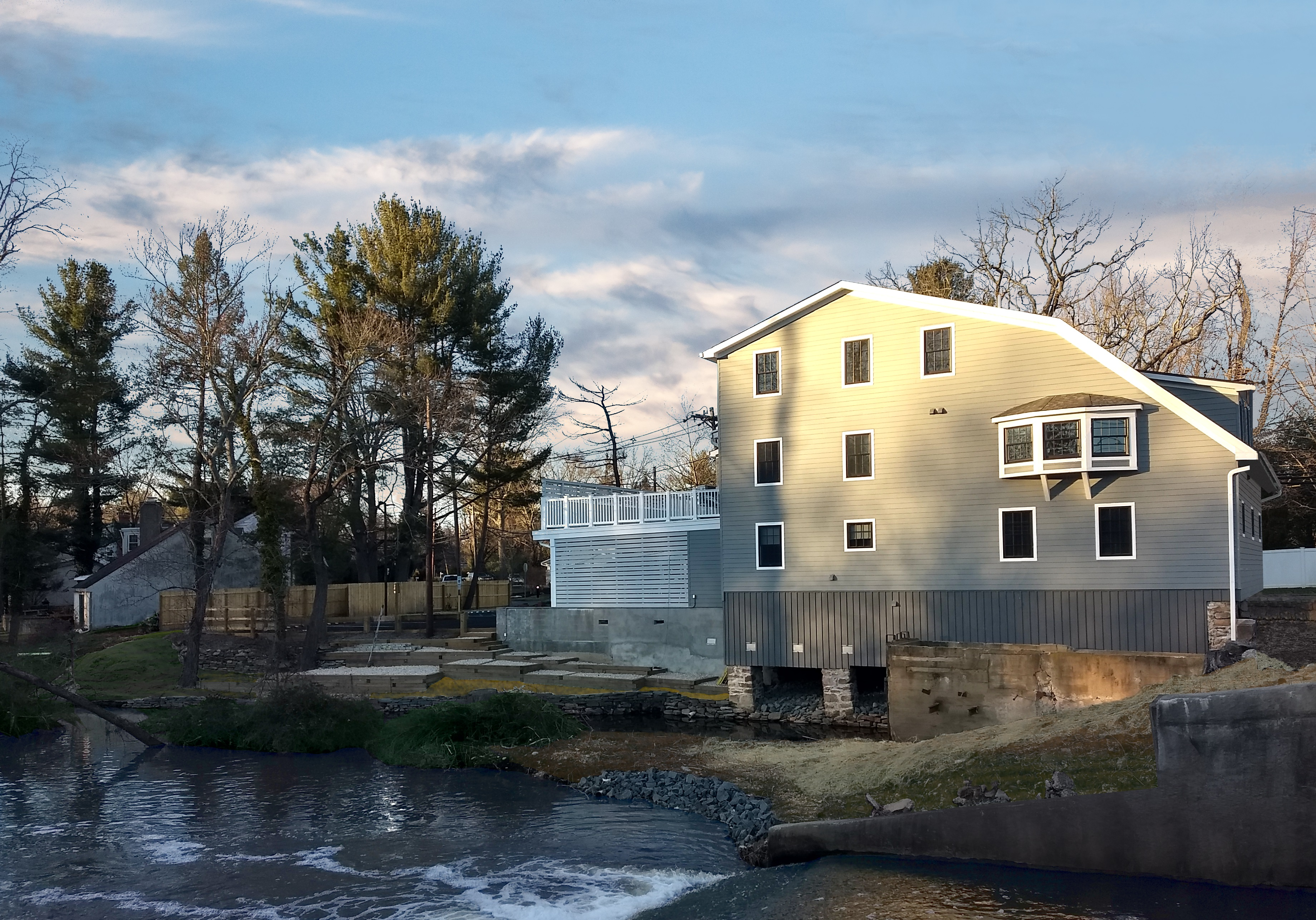
- The original saw/grist mill at Grovers Mill, 164 Cranbury Road. Viewed from Clarksville Road.

- Location within Mercer County, New Jersey Location within New Jersey Location within the United States
- Coordinates: 40°19′00″N 74°36′34″W
- Country: United States
- State: New Jersey
- County: Mercer
- Township: West Windsor
- Elevation: 69 ft (21 m)
- Time zone: UTC−05:00 (EST)
  - Summer (DST): UTC−04:00 (EDT)
- ZIP Code: 08550
- FIPS code: 34-28560
- GNIS ID: 876839

Grovers Mill is an unincorporated community located within West Windsor in Mercer County, in the U.S. state of New Jersey. It is centered around the intersection of Clarksville Road and Cranbury Road, adjacent to the community's mill-pond. It is 4 miles (6 km) southeast of Princeton, 6 miles (10 km) northwest of Hightstown, and 12 miles (19 km) northeast of Trenton, the state capital.

== History ==
The community grew around a saw/gristmill at 164 Cranbury Road, which was likely constructed in the mid-1700s. The mill's first owner was Daniel Wolsey in 1759. It is presumed that the adjacent mill pond was formed around the same time through the damming of the Bear Brook, whose flow through a concrete-walled raceway turned a large wooden water wheel for generations.

Grovers Mill assumed various names depending on its ownership: "Woolsey's Mill" (1750s), "Wright's Mill" (1760s), "Bergen's Mill" (1770s-1805; 1811-1816), "Walker's Mill" (1805-1811), "Thomas' Mill"/"Bear Mill" (1816-1837), "Schwenger's Mill" (1837-1868), and, after Joseph H. Grover purchased it in 1868, "Grover's Mill". The apostrophe in the name is often not included in colloquial writing.

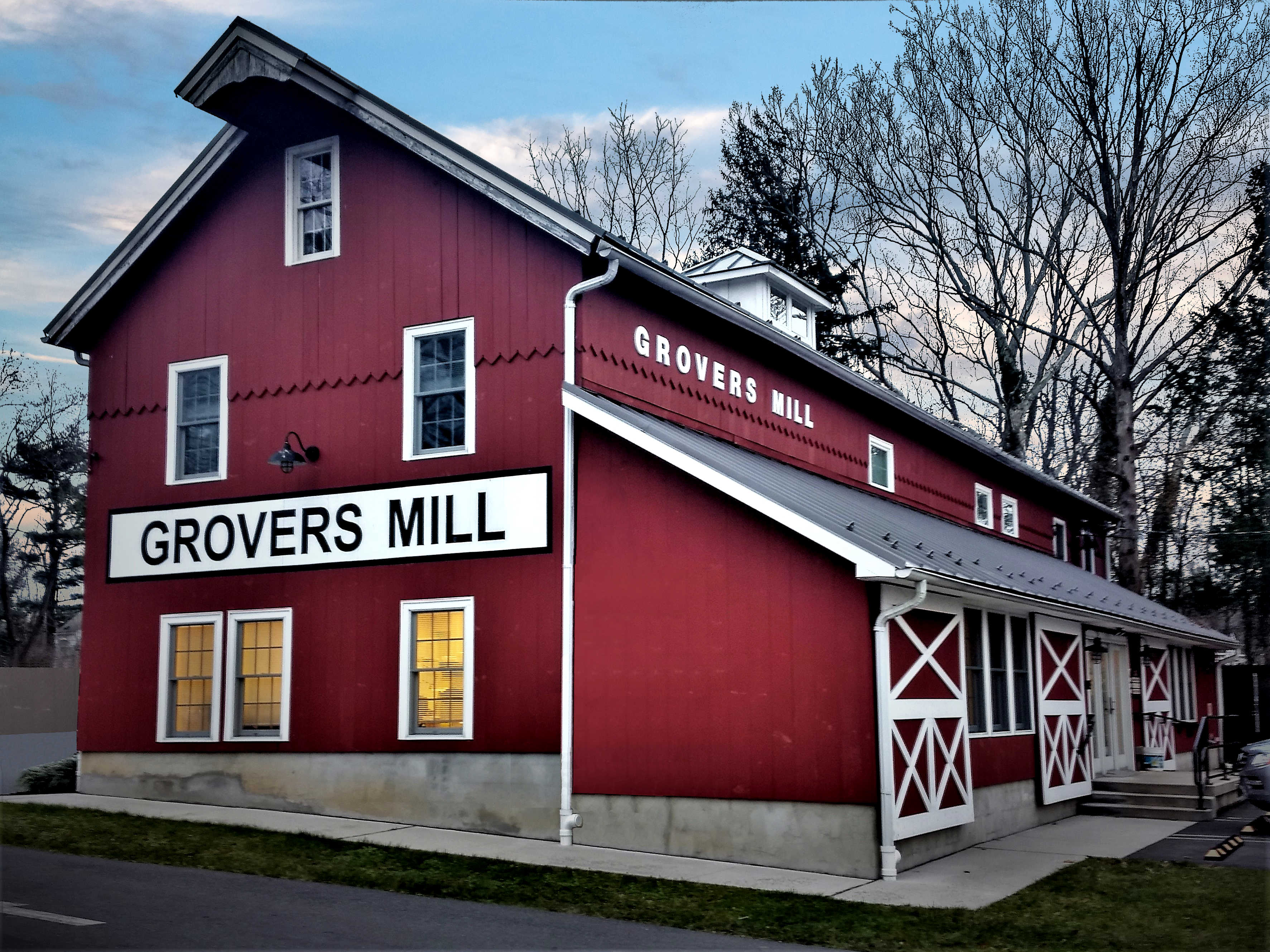
The mid-1700s Grovers Mill barn, located at the intersection around which the hamlet is centered.

Several adjacent houses date to the 1700s and 1800s; it is believed they housed tenant workers. Another house at 175 Cranbury Road was historically the millwright's house from the late 1700s onward, although a possibly-older house at 429 Clarksville Road, nicknamed "Ladyfair", may have been the original millwright's house before then.

Grovers Mill experienced suburban growth (and thus the loss of most surrounding farmland) starting in the mid-1900s. However, a number of its 1700s-era and 1800s-era buildings remain.

In October 2019, the Historical Society of West Windsor started an online museum exploring the history of West Windsor, including a series of webpages dedicated to Grovers Mill.

== In popular culture ==
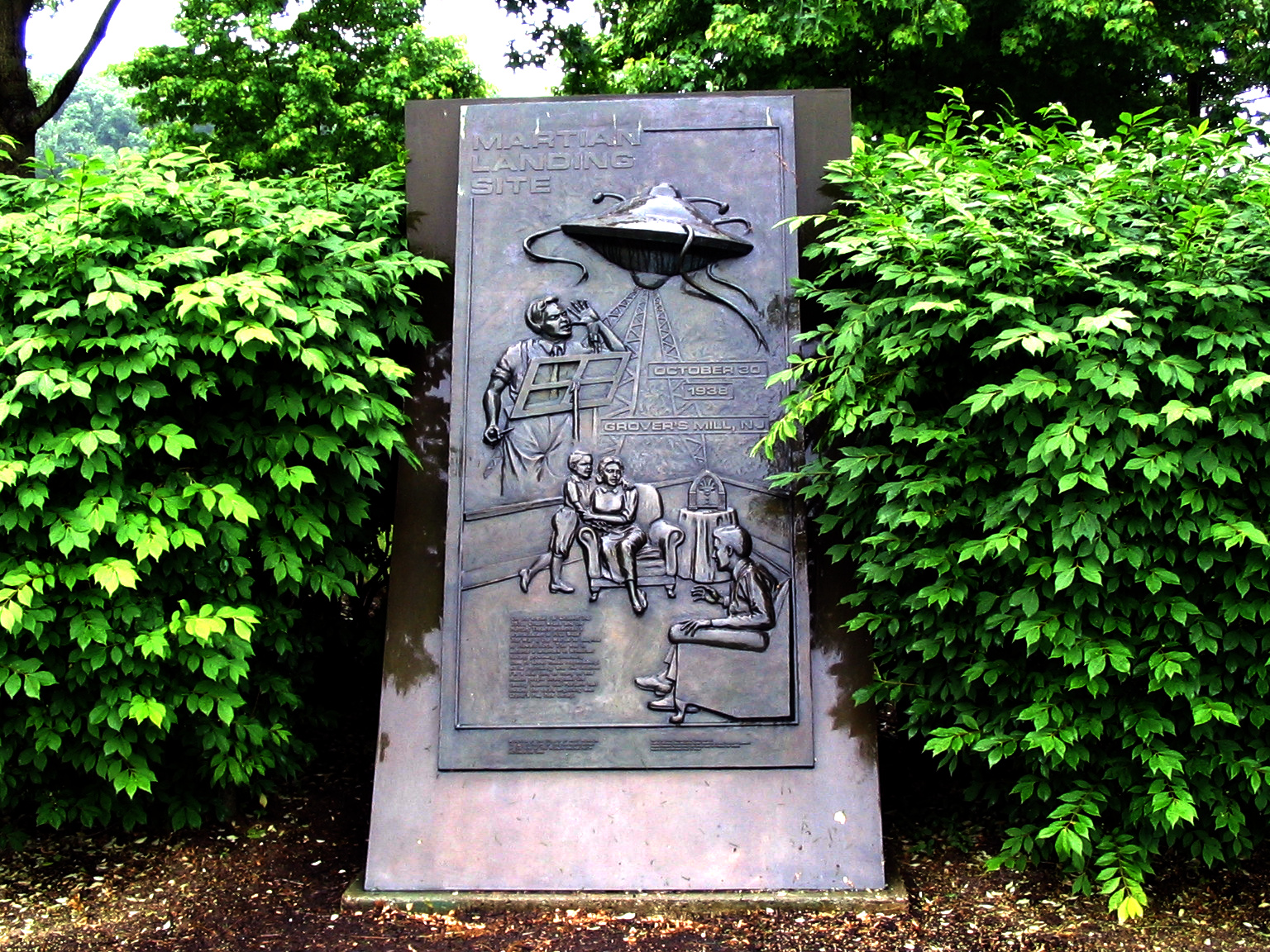
"Martian landing site" historical marker commemorating the 1938 War of the Worlds radio broadcast.

On October 30, 1938, Grovers Mill was made famous in Orson Welles' adaptation of The War of the Worlds for his CBS Radio program The Mercury Theatre on the Air, in which the community was depicted as the initial landing site for a Martian invasion of Earth. The radio play's scriptwriter Howard Koch selected Grovers Mill by randomly dropping a pencil point onto a map of New Jersey, later noting he "liked the sound" of the name.

There have been numerous other references in fiction, including The Adventures of Buckaroo Banzai Across the 8th Dimension, the Wild Cards book series, and a town called "Miller's Grove" in the 1996 The X-Files episode "War of the Coprophages".

In issue 11 of DC Comics' The Shadow Strikes (1989), The Shadow teams up with a radio announcer named Grover Mills, a character based on the young Orson Welles, who has been impersonating The Shadow on the radio. Welles played the Shadow on radio prior to the War of the Worlds broadcast. An episode of the War of the Worlds TV series takes place in Grovers Mill on the 50th anniversary of the Welles radio drama, and expands on the town's ties to the infamous broadcast.

Grovers Mill is also a 2006 film shot in Vancouver, British Columbia. 2018 saw the release of the black comedy audio series Grovers Mill, a true-crime satire about a forensic psychic investigating the Moon landing conspiracy.
