= Penns Neck Baptist Church =

Historic church in New Jersey, United States

- Princeton Baptist Church
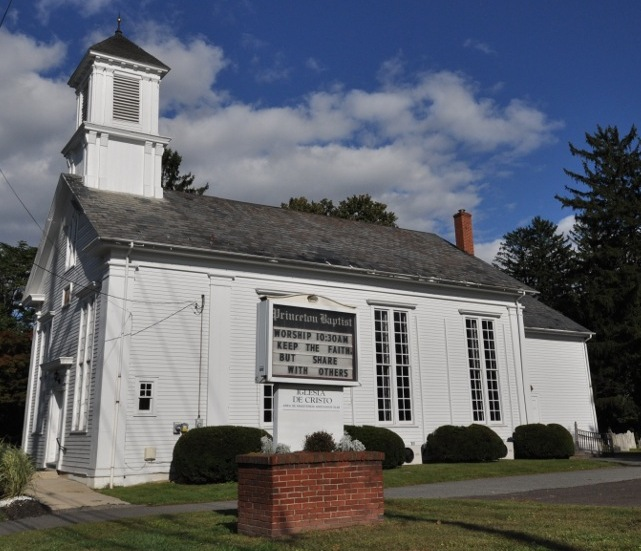
- Location: US 1 at Princeton-Hightstown Road, Penns Neck, New Jersey
- Country: United States
- Denomination: American Baptist Churches USA

History
- Former name: Williamsborough Baptist Church
- Dedicated: December 5, 1812

Architecture
- Architect: Elias Bailey
- Style: Colonial, Federal, Georgian
- Penns Neck Baptist Church
- U.S. National Register of Historic Places
- New Jersey Register of Historic Places
- Location within Mercer County, New Jersey Location within New Jersey Location within the United States
- Coordinates: 40°19′52.8″N 74°38′12.4″W
- Area: 2 acres (0.81 ha)
- NRHP reference No.: 89002160
- NJRHP No.: 1819

Significant dates
- Added to NRHP: December 28, 1989
- Designated NJRHP: November 14, 1989

Penns Neck Baptist Church (also known as Red Lion Tavern and Princeton Baptist Church at Penns Neck) is a historic church located on US 1 at Washington Road in the Penns Neck section of West Windsor Township, Mercer County, New Jersey, United States. Built in 1812, the church was added to the National Register of Historic Places on December 28, 1989, for its significance in architecture, exploration/settlement, and religion.

== History ==
The church was built alongside the then new Trenton and New Brunswick Turnpike, now Route One. The turnpike, which had opened in 1807, was designed to help provide a proper road connection between Philadelphia and New York City. The parsonage pre-dated the church and had been a public house in which, it is thought, George Washington and William Penn had stayed. At the time the area was also called Williamsburg and the church was first referred to as Williamsborough Baptist. The Rev. Peter Wilson started in ministry in central Jersey preaching in private homes, starting at that of John Flock in Pennington in 1790, and also at John Campbell's house in Princeton. In 1791 John Hight and his wife of Penn's Neck were baptized and preaching continued in their home as well as others in Princeton. By the time the church was built, twenty-nine residents of the Penn's Neck area had been baptized including Richard Thomas, who would later serve as a delegate to the New Jersey Association (formed 1811), and New Jersey Baptist State Convention (formed 1830). Funds for the church building were raised from the congregation in Hightstown as well as residents of Princeton. At its dedication the church had thirty-seven members.

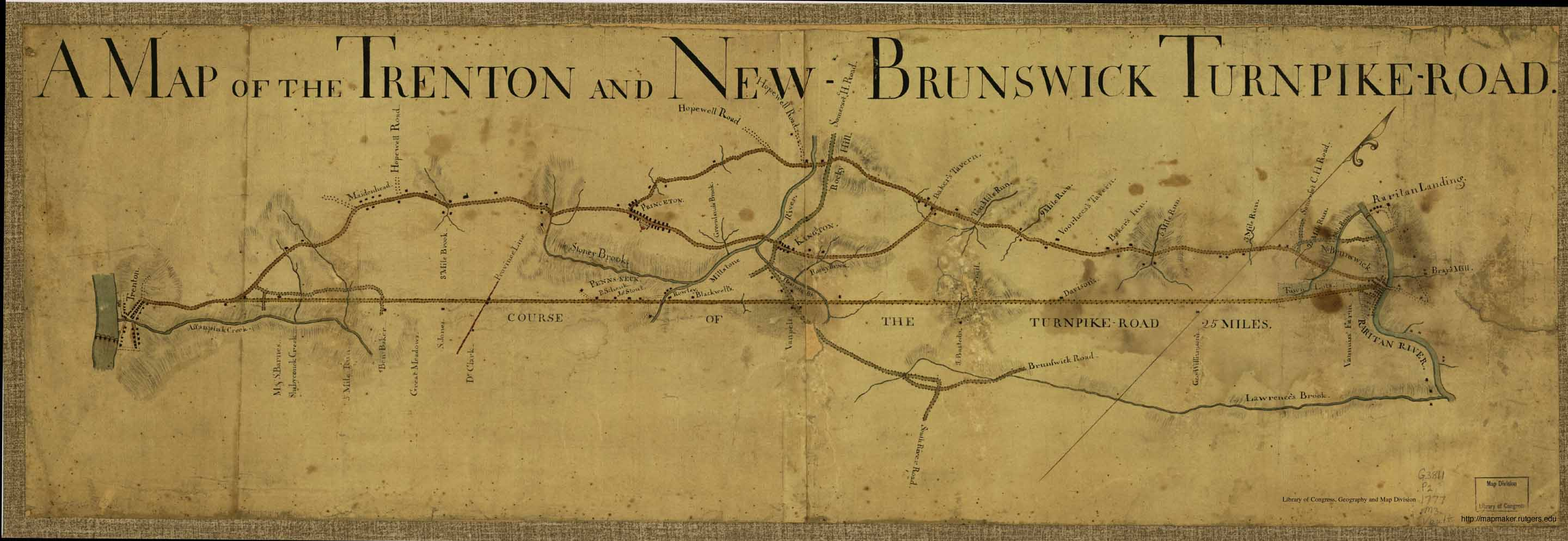
The layout for the then-proposed Trenton and New Brunswick Turnpike showing Penn's Neck before the building of the church

== See also ==
- National Register of Historic Places listings in Mercer County, New Jersey
