= Dutch Neck, Mercer County, New Jersey =

Populated place in Mercer County, New Jersey, US

Dutch Neck, New Jersey
- Unincorporated community
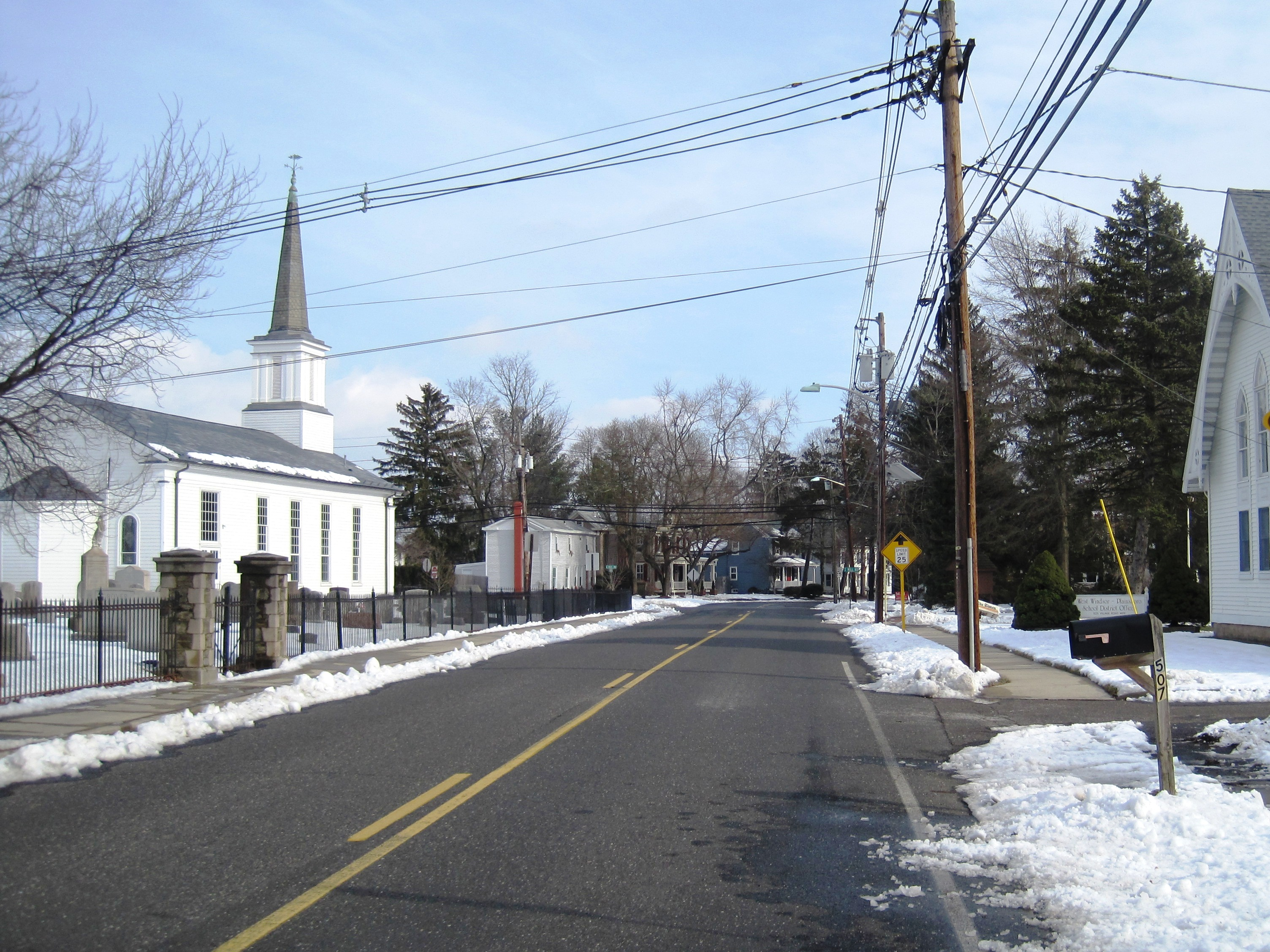
- Dutch Neck from Village Road West

- Location within Mercer County, New Jersey Location within New Jersey Location within the United States
- Coordinates: 40°16′56″N 74°36′50″W
- Country: United States
- State: New Jersey
- County: Mercer
- Township: West Windsor
- Elevation: 105 ft (32 m)
- GNIS feature ID: 876019

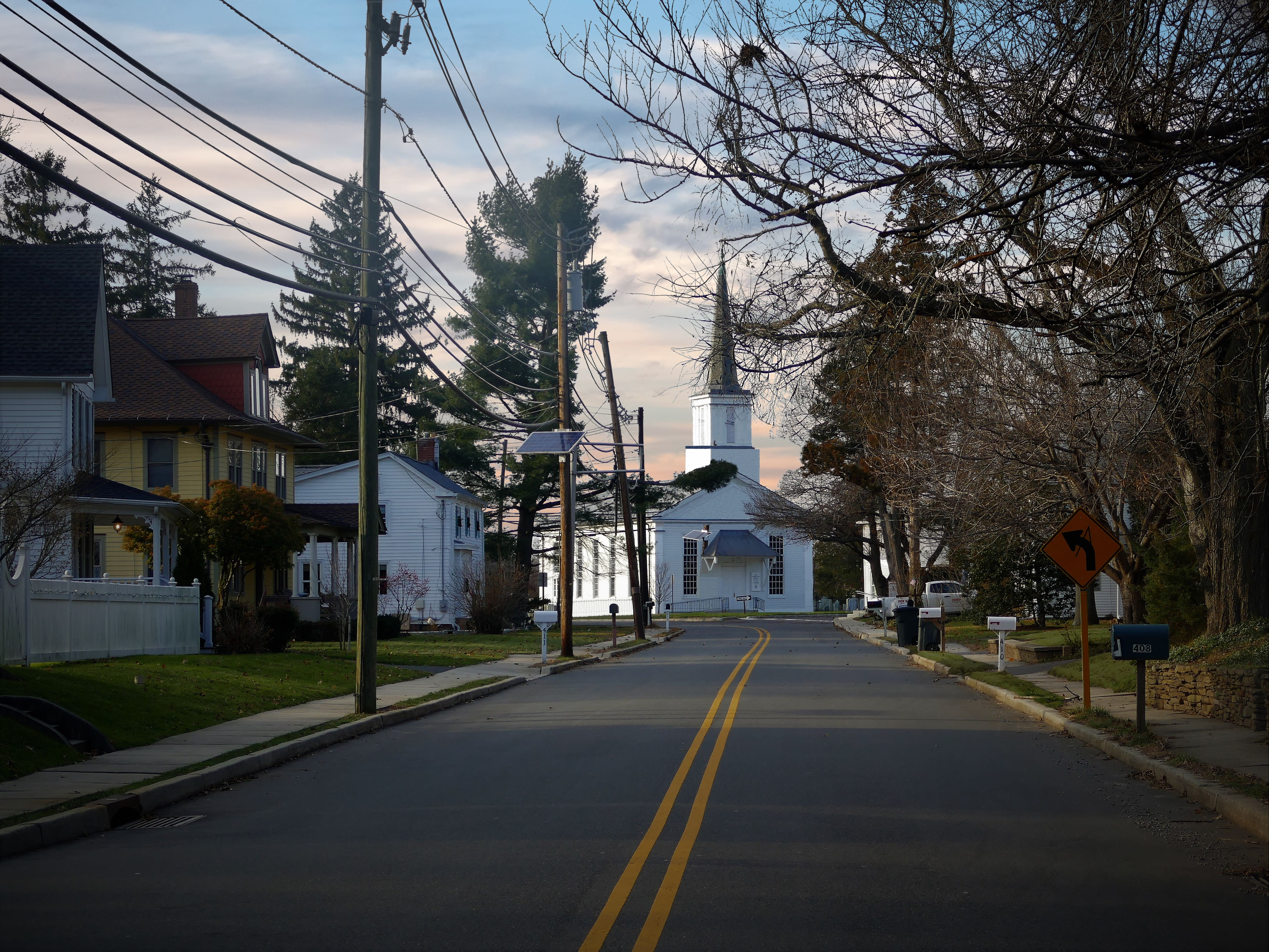
A view down Village Road East, looking towards the Dutch Neck Presbyterian Church (built 1816)

Dutch Neck is an unincorporated community located within West Windsor Township in Mercer County, in the U.S. state of New Jersey. The community is centered about the intersection of Village Road East, Village Road West, and South Mill Road and has in the vicinity several churches, the West Windsor Volunteer Fire Company No. 1, Dutch Neck Elementary School, and many residences.

The community was founded in the mid-1700s by families such as the Voorhees, Updikes, and Perrines, many of whom were Dutch. Many early residents are buried in the mid-1700s graveyard behind the Dutch Neck Presbyterian Church - itself one of West Windsor's oldest houses of worship, constructed in 1816 to replace a "Neck Meeting House" built in the mid-late eighteenth century.

An inn at the crossroads hosted the first town meeting on April 8, 1797, and many more thereafter until the 1870s. It was moved to 212-214 South Mill Road in the early 1900s. There was also a general store/post office, a chapel/Sunday school/library/courthouse/West Windsor-Plainsboro Regional School District Board of Education building, a wheelwright, blacksmith, schoolhouse, and substantial farms. From 1912 to the 1970s, a dedicated "Town Hall" sat at the crossroads. In 1917, the brick-and-stone Dutch Neck Elementary School was constructed on top of a pauper's cemetery. In 1921, the West Windsor Volunteer Fire Company formed here.

Dutch Neck transformed in the late 1900s along with West Windsor Township's general population growth. More houses of worship were established nearby during this time period: Saint David the King Roman Catholic Church, Windsor Chapel Evangelical Church, and Beth Chaim Reform Jewish Synagogue. Also during this time, the expansive farmland that surrounded Dutch Neck was almost entirely replaced by suburban developments.

However, the vicinity surrounding the crossroads retains several dozen buildings that are a century old or older.

In October 2019, the Historical Society of West Windsor published an online museum exploring the history of West Windsor, including that of Dutch Neck.
