= West Windsor, New Jersey =

Township in Mercer County, New Jersey, US

- Township
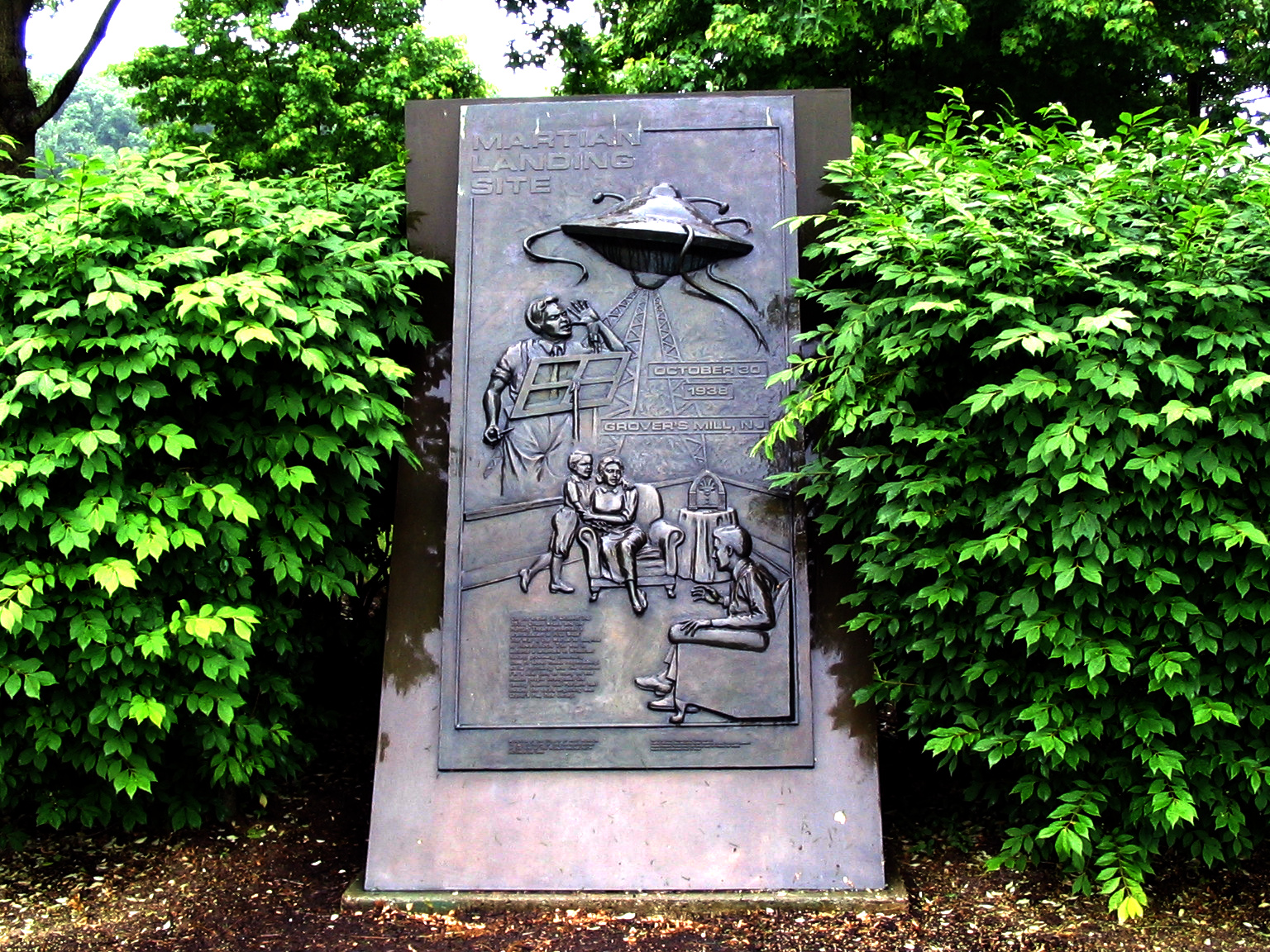
- War of the Worlds monument in Grovers Mill

- Seal

- Location of West Windsor in Mercer County highlighted in red (right). Inset map: Location of Mercer County in New Jersey highlighted in orange (left).

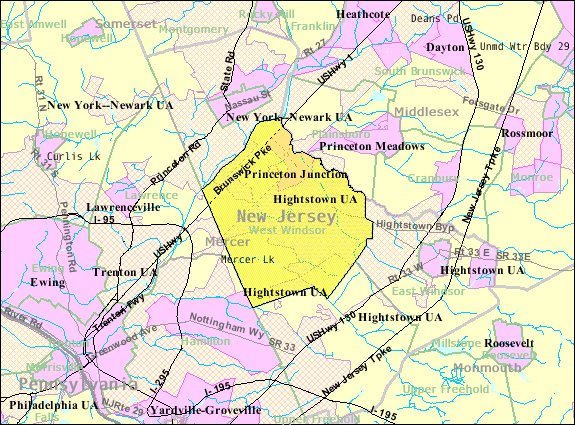
- Census Bureau map of West Windsor Township, New Jersey

- Location in Mercer County Location in New Jersey Location in the United States
- Coordinates: 40.290253°N 74.627672°W
- Country: United States
- State: New Jersey
- County: Mercer
- Incorporated: February 21, 1798

Government
  - Type: Faulkner Act Mayor-Council
  - Body: Township Council
  - Mayor: Hemant Marathe (term ends 1/14/2030)
  - Administrator: Marlena Schmid
  - Municipal clerk: Allison Sheehan

Area
  - Total: 26.25 sq mi (68.00 km^{2})
  - Land: 25.55 sq mi (66.17 km^{2})
  - Water: 0.71 sq mi (1.83 km^{2}) 2.69%
  - Rank: 101st of 565 in state 3rd of 12 in county
- Elevation: 92 ft (28 m)

Population (2020)
  - Total: 29,518
  - Estimate (2023): 30,509
  - Rank: 82nd of 565 in state 7th of 12 in county
  - Density: 1,155.3/sq mi (446.1/km^{2})
  - Rank: 367th of 565 in state 10th of 12 in county
- Time zone: UTC−05:00 (Eastern (EST))
  - Summer (DST): UTC−04:00 (Eastern (EDT))
- ZIP Codes: 08550 – Princeton Junction and 08540 – Princeton, New Jersey
- Area code: 609
- FIPS code: 3402180240
- GNIS feature ID: 0882124
- Website: www.westwindsortwp.gov

West Windsor is a township in Mercer County, in the U.S. state of New Jersey. Located at the cross-roads between the Delaware Valley region to the southwest and the Raritan Valley region to the northeast, the township is considered to be an outer-ring suburb of New York City in the New York metropolitan area, as defined by the United States Census Bureau. As of the 2020 United States census, the township's population was 29,518, its highest decennial count ever and an increase of 2,353 (+8.7%) from the 27,165 recorded at the 2010 census, which in turn reflected an increase of 5,258 (+24.0%) from the 21,907 counted in the 2000 census.

West Windsor and adjacent East Windsor were established by an act of the New Jersey Legislature on February 9, 1797, and incorporated on February 21, 1798, as two of the state's initial group of 104 townships, by partitioning provincial Windsor Township.

The Borough of Princeton, since consolidated as part of Princeton, was formed from a portion of the township on February 11, 1813. The township is closely associated with the more widely known municipality and several localities within West Windsor use Princeton in their name, the most notable of those being Princeton Junction. The Princeton 08540 post office facility is located within West Windsor, and covers parts of the township designated by Princeton mailing addresses.

A portion of Princeton University, covering 400 acres (160 ha) south of Lake Carnegie, is located in West Windsor. The university agreed in 2009 to make an annual payment in lieu of taxes of $50,000 that would be indexed to inflation to cover 81 acres (33 ha) of land in the township that the university had purchased in 2002.

West Windsor is frequently ranked among some of the highest-income municipalities in New Jersey. In 2008, Forbes listed West Windsor as the 15th most affluent neighborhood in the U.S. Using 2012–2016 data from the U.S. Census Bureau, NJ.com listed the township as the 9th highest-income in the state in its January 2018 article "The 19 wealthiest towns in New Jersey, ranked." Based on data from the American Community Survey for 2013–2017, West Windsor residents had a median household income of $175,684, ranked 4th in the state among municipalities with more than 10,000 residents, more than double the statewide median of $76,475.

== History ==
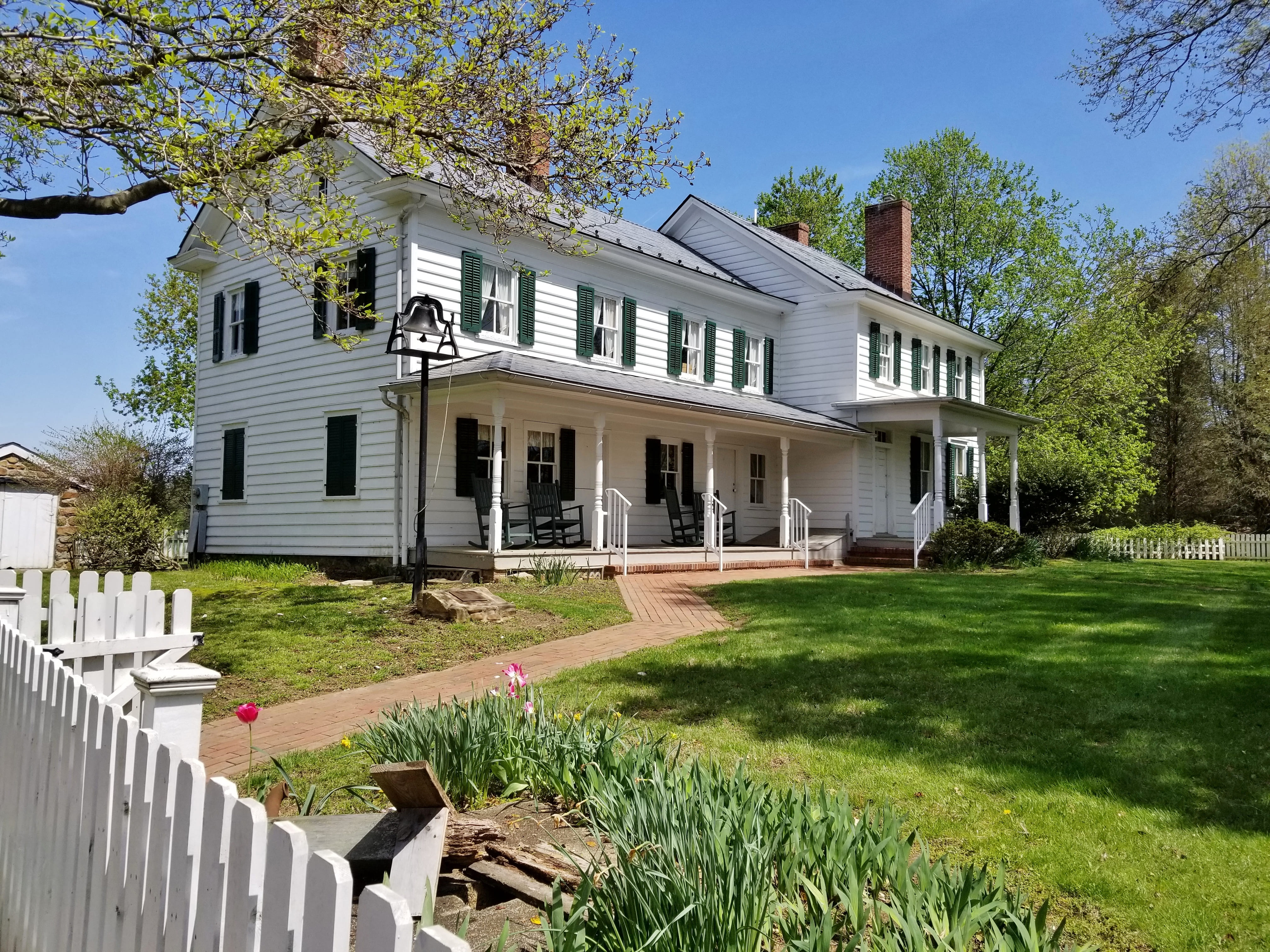
The c. 1790 Schenck Farmstead, at 50 Southfield Road, Functions as the West Windsor History Museum and the headquarters of the Historical Society of West Windsor.

Prior to individual European land acquisition and settlement around the turn of the 18th century, the primary residents of West Windsor were the Lenape Native Americans. The Assanhicans (Assunpinks) were the subtribe that inhabited the greater Trenton area; artifacts from their society are still found in West Windsor.

In 1634, and English captain named Thomas Yong explored the Delaware River, up to the general Trenton area. Had his crew followed the Assunpink northeastward, their path would have taken them to the general West Windsor area. However, they did not, and the identity of the first European person to set foot in West Windsor is unknown.

The West Windsor area was within Piscataway Township when it was chartered on December 18, 1666. This changed upon the formation of Middlesex County in 1683.

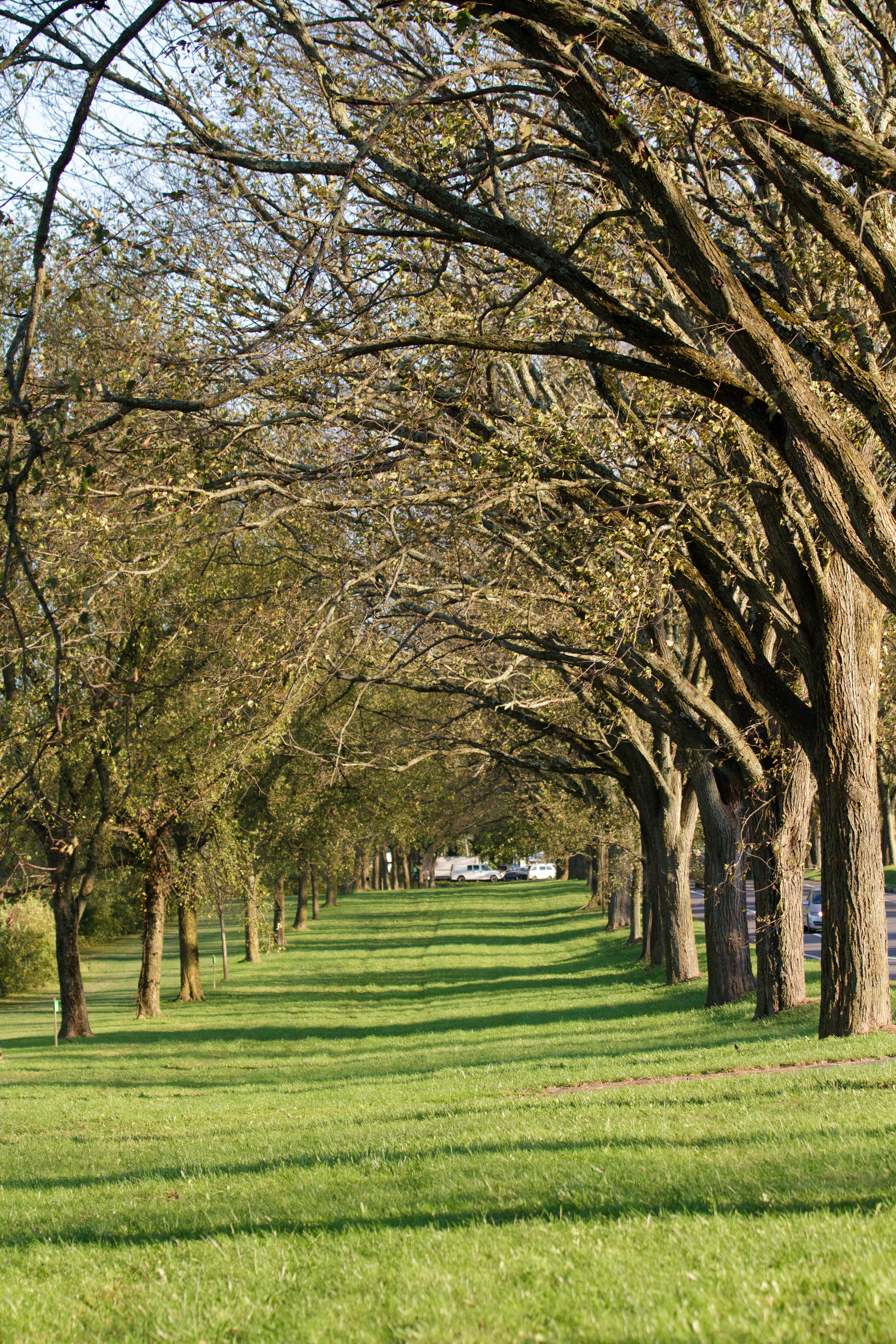
Washington Road Elm Allée

New Windsor Township (West Windsor's predecessor), known later as Windsor Township, was unofficially formed in 1730/1731, and officially created by Royal Charter on March 9, 1751, from a partition of Piscataway Township. Its borders encompassed today's West Windsor Township, East Windsor Township, Hightstown Borough and Robbinsville Township, as well as present-day Princeton southeast of Nassau Street and portions of present-day Millstone Township and Monroe Township. In 1756, The College of New Jersey relocated to Nassau Hall in the village of Princeton. When West Windsor and East Windsor were created from the division of Windsor Township on February 9, 1797, West Windsor's boundaries extended up to Nassau Street. Following the 1838 formation of Mercer County and further land acquisitions by Princeton in 1843 and 1853, West Windsor's borders were again redefined to reflect the township's current 26.84 square miles (69.5 km^{2}).

Historically, West Windsor relied heavily upon agriculture. Common products were wheat, tomatoes, rye, and potatoes. This farming identity dominated the township from its first settlement until the last half of the 20th century, and was really only extinguished upon the township's most rapid period of growth from the late 1970s-the 2000s.

However, this agrarian dominance incentivized the institution of slavery as well. Although records are sparse, township censuses indicate 190 slaves in Windsor Township in 1790. In West Windsor, there were 21 slaves in 1830 and 3 in 1840. Additionally, several late 1700s wills and 1800s "abandonments" show the presence of slavery in the township around the turn of the 19th century.

West Windsor never developed a centralized "downtown." Instead, The township contained within it (entirely or partly) several small hamlets whose names and locations are still identifiable and/or in use in contemporary times. They are as follows:

- Aqueduct Mills – centered at Mapleton Avenue, Lower Harrison Street, and the Millstone River. Partly located in Plainsboro.
- Canal/Princeton Basin – at the intersection of Alexander Road and the Delaware & Raritan Canal. Partially located in Princeton.
- Clarksville – at the intersection of Route 1 and Quakerbridge Road.
- Dutch Neck – at the intersection of Village Roads East/West and South Mill Road.
- Edinburg – at the intersection of Old Trenton and Edinburg Roads.
- Jugtown/Queenston – at the intersection of Nassau and Harrison Streets. Now fully located in Princeton.
- Grovers Mill – at the intersection of Cranbury and Clarksville Roads.
- Penns Neck – Centered at the intersection of Washington Road and Route 1.
- Port Windsor/Mercer – at the end of Quakerbridge Road at the Delaware Canal. Partially located in Lawrence.
- Princeton Junction – Initially centered at the Princeton Junction Train Station. Manifested after the mid-1860s relocation of the Camden and Amboy Railroad line (now the Northeast Corridor) and opening of the current station.

Grover's Mill in West Windsor was the site Orson Welles chose for the Martian invasion in his infamous 1938 radio broadcast of The War of the Worlds.

During the later part of the 20th century, the township underwent dramatic changes, driven mainly by a major boom in new housing developments. For generations, West Windsor had existed mostly as a sparsely populated agricultural community according to a 1999 article in The New York Times, the township "has grown into a sprawl of expensive houses in carefully groomed developments, and home to nearly 20,000 people", since the 1970s.

The West Windsor post office was found to be infected with anthrax during the 2001 anthrax attacks.

In April 2002, a memorial was dedicated to the seven residents of West Windsor who died in the September 11 terrorist attacks.

In October 2019, the Historical Society of West Windsor published an online museum exploring the history of West Windsor.

== Geography ==
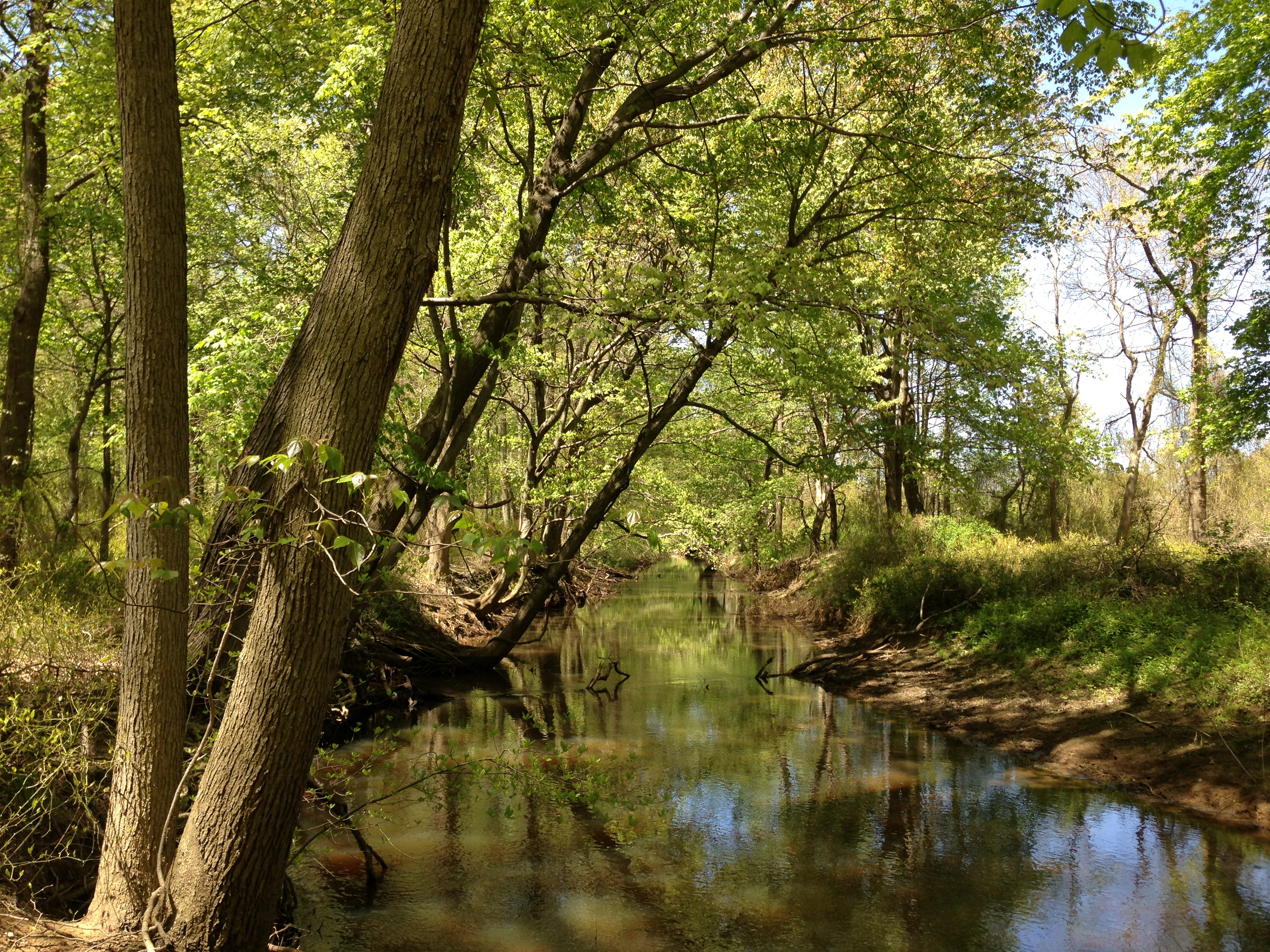
View west along the Assunpink Creek in West Windsor.

According to the United States Census Bureau, the township had a total area of 26.25 square miles (68.00 km^{2}), including 25.55 square miles (66.17 km^{2}) of land and 0.71 square miles (1.83 km^{2}) of water (2.69%).

Princeton Junction (with a 2020 Census population of 2,475) is an unincorporated community and census-designated place located within West Windsor. Other unincorporated communities in the township include Berrien City, Dutch Neck, Edinburg, Grover's Mill, Millstone, Penns Neck, Port Mercer, Post Corner, and Princeton Ivy East.

The township borders the municipalities of East Windsor, Hamilton, Lawrence Township, Princeton and Robbinsville in Mercer County; and Plainsboro in Middlesex County.

The Howard Hughes Corporation has proposed redevelopment of a 653-acre (264 ha) tract of land bounded by the Northeast Corridor train line, Route 1, and Quakerbridge Road, which includes land once owned by American Cyanamid and last used up until 2002 as an agricultural research facility by BASF; in of 2017 a plan was proposed to create mixed-use development that would include 2,000 residences along with 1,300,000 square feet (120,000 m^{2}) of retail and commercial space on the site, which is currently zoned for commercial use. The local school district has developed a report identifying significant potential growth in the number of students enrolling from this and other residential development in both West Windsor and Plainsboro. In 2019, Atlantic Realty purchased the property, and in November 2020 they and the township reached an agreement to restrict the tract to non-residential use and convert it to warehouse space. The West Windsor Planning Board granted approval to build 5.5 million square feet of warehouse space (called "Bridge Point 8") on June 29, 2022."

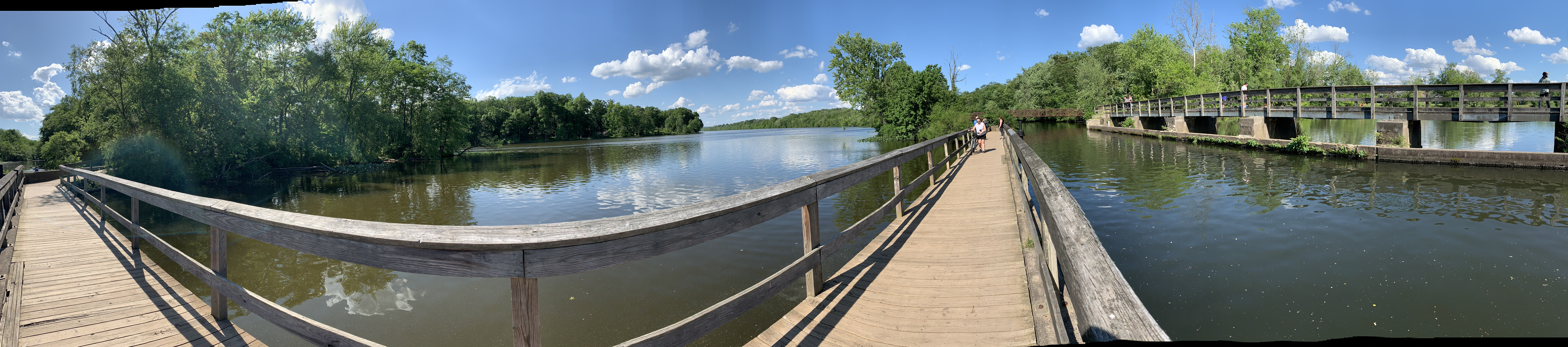
The Millstone River as it enters into the D&R Canal, on the border of West Windsor and Plainsboro Township.

== Climate ==
According to the Köppen climate classification system, West Windsor Township has a Hot-summer Humid continental climate (Dfa).

Climate data for West Windsor Twp (40.2897, -74.6266), 1991-2020 normals, extremes 1981-2024
Month	Jan	Feb	Mar	Apr	May	Jun	Jul	Aug	Sep	Oct	Nov	Dec	Year
Record high °F (°C)	71.6 (22.0)	77.6 (25.3)	88.0 (31.1)	95.1 (35.1)	95.4 (35.2)	98.1 (36.7)	102.6 (39.2)	101.4 (38.6)	97.6 (36.4)	93.7 (34.3)	82.4 (28.0)	75.6 (24.2)	102.6 (39.2)
Mean daily maximum °F (°C)	40.2 (4.6)	42.7 (5.9)	50.5 (10.3)	62.9 (17.2)	72.5 (22.5)	81.7 (27.6)	86.3 (30.2)	84.5 (29.2)	78.1 (25.6)	66.1 (18.9)	55.4 (13.0)	45.3 (7.4)	63.9 (17.7)
Daily mean °F (°C)	31.8 (−0.1)	33.8 (1.0)	41.1 (5.1)	52.2 (11.2)	61.8 (16.6)	71.0 (21.7)	76.0 (24.4)	74.2 (23.4)	67.4 (19.7)	55.6 (13.1)	45.4 (7.4)	36.9 (2.7)	54.0 (12.2)
Mean daily minimum °F (°C)	23.4 (−4.8)	24.8 (−4.0)	31.7 (−0.2)	41.5 (5.3)	51.1 (10.6)	60.3 (15.7)	65.6 (18.7)	63.8 (17.7)	56.8 (13.8)	45.1 (7.3)	35.4 (1.9)	28.6 (−1.9)	44.1 (6.7)
Record low °F (°C)	−11.2 (−24.0)	−4.1 (−20.1)	3.8 (−15.7)	17.8 (−7.9)	32.0 (0.0)	40.0 (4.4)	46.4 (8.0)	41.4 (5.2)	34.8 (1.6)	24.0 (−4.4)	9.7 (−12.4)	−0.1 (−17.8)	−11.2 (−24.0)
Average precipitation inches (mm)	3.53 (90)	2.71 (69)	4.26 (108)	3.69 (94)	4.05 (103)	4.53 (115)	4.94 (125)	4.43 (113)	4.17 (106)	4.02 (102)	3.30 (84)	4.33 (110)	47.95 (1,218)
Average snowfall inches (cm)	7.6 (19)	8.3 (21)	3.7 (9.4)	0.1 (0.25)	0.0 (0.0)	0.0 (0.0)	0.0 (0.0)	0.0 (0.0)	0.0 (0.0)	0.1 (0.25)	0.6 (1.5)	3.6 (9.1)	24.0 (61)
Average dew point °F (°C)	21.6 (−5.8)	22.2 (−5.4)	27.7 (−2.4)	37.2 (2.9)	49.1 (9.5)	59.4 (15.2)	64.2 (17.9)	63.5 (17.5)	57.6 (14.2)	45.9 (7.7)	34.9 (1.6)	27.3 (−2.6)	42.7 (5.9)
Source 1: PRISM
Source 2: NOHRSC (Snow, 2008/2009 - 2024/2025 normals)

== Ecology ==
According to the A. W. Kuchler U.S. potential natural vegetation types, West Windsor Township would have a dominant vegetation type of Appalachian Oak (104) with a dominant vegetation form of Eastern Hardwood Forest (25).

== Demographics ==
Historical population
Census	Pop.	Note	%±
1810	1,714		—
1820	1,918		11.9%
1830	2,129		11.0%
1840	1,536		−27.9%
1850	1,596		3.9%
1860	1,497		−6.2%
1870	1,428		−4.6%
1880	1,396		−2.2%
1890	1,329		−4.8%
1900	1,279		−3.8%
1910	1,342		4.9%
1920	1,389		3.5%
1930	1,711		23.2%
1940	2,160		26.2%
1950	2,519		16.6%
1960	4,016		59.4%
1970	6,431		60.1%
1980	8,542		32.8%
1990	16,021		87.6%
2000	21,907		36.7%
2010	27,165		24.0%
2020	29,518		8.7%
2023 (est.)	30,509		3.4%
Population sources: 1800–1920 1840 1850–1870; 1850 1870 1880–1890; 1890–1910 1910–1930; 1940–2000 2000; 2010 2020

AOL/NeighborhoodScout named West Windsor in 2009 as the best neighborhood to raise children because of its school district (top 7% in New Jersey, top 3% nationwide), prevailing family type (families with school-aged children), and neighborhood safety (safer than 97% of neighborhoods). As of January 2018 the township's population was the second most educated in the state of New Jersey, according to an analysis by NJ.com. The percent of residents with a bachelor's degree or higher was 81.7%, with 48% of residents holding advanced graduate or professional degrees.

=== 2010 census ===
The 2010 United States census counted 27,165 people, 9,449 households, and 7,606 families in the township. The population density was 1,062.6 per square mile (410.3/km^{2}). There were 9,810 housing units at an average density of 383.7 per square mile (148.1/km^{2}). The racial makeup was 54.94% (14,924) White, 3.67% (998) Black or African American, 0.09% (25) Native American, 37.71% (10,245) Asian, 0.04% (10) Pacific Islander, 0.97% (263) from other races, and 2.58% (700) from two or more races. Hispanic or Latino of any race were 4.47% (1,213) of the population.

Of the 9,449 households, 45.5% had children under the age of 18; 73.0% were married couples living together; 5.6% had a female householder with no husband present and 19.5% were non-families. Of all households, 16.7% were made up of individuals and 6.1% had someone living alone who was 65 years of age or older. The average household size was 2.85 and the average family size was 3.23.

28.4% of the population were under the age of 18, 5.1% from 18 to 24, 26.2% from 25 to 44, 29.5% from 45 to 64, and 10.8% who were 65 years of age or older. The median age was 39.6 years. For every 100 females, the population had 94.7 males. For every 100 females ages 18 and older there were 91.4 males.

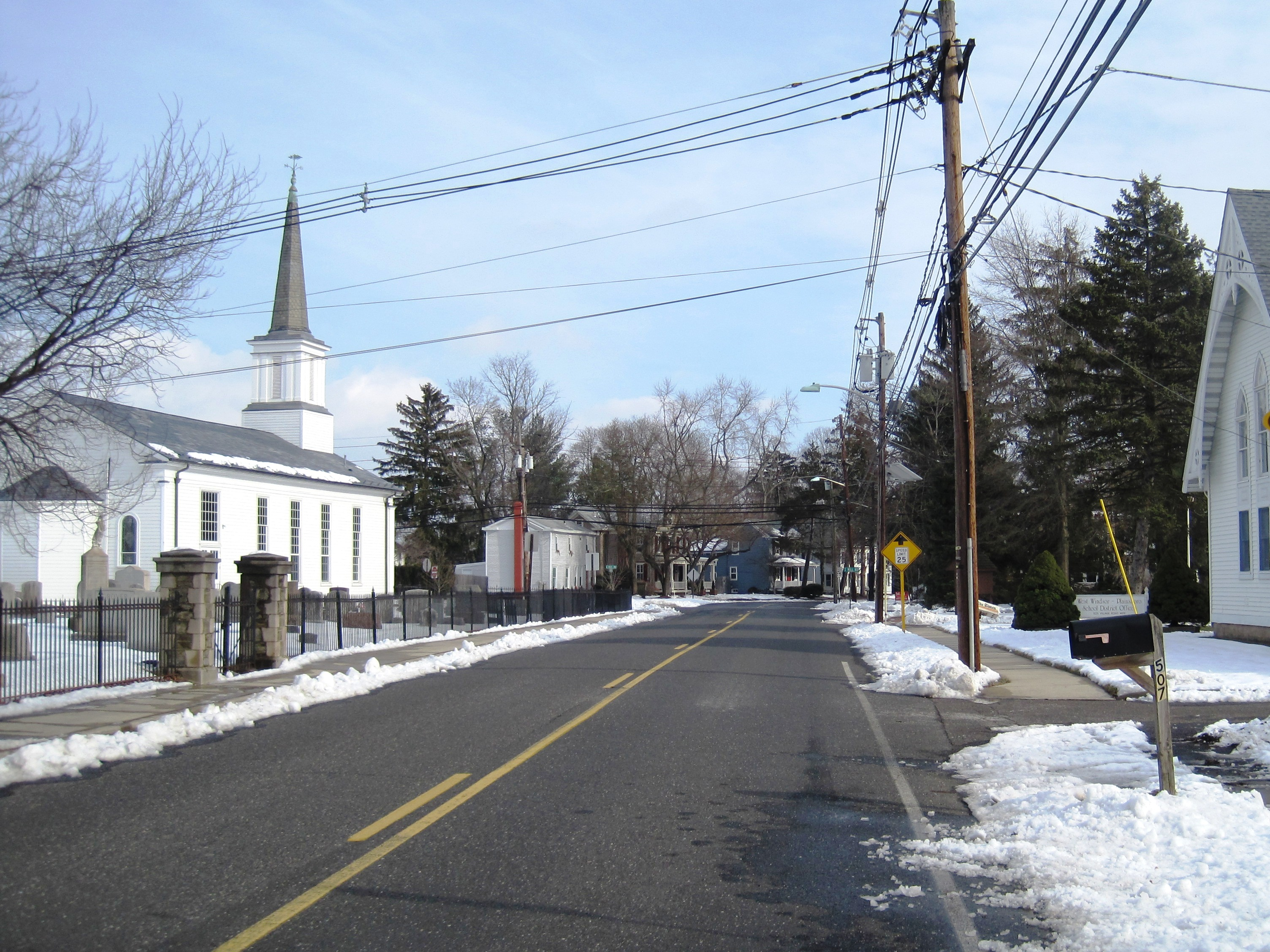
Dutch Neck neighborhood

The Census Bureau's 2006–2010 American Community Survey showed that (in 2010 inflation-adjusted dollars) median household income was $137,265 (with a margin of error of +/− $12,610) and the median family income was $156,110 (+/− $6,769). Males had a median income of $120,662 (+/− $6,410) versus $71,151 (+/− $9,841) for females. The per capita income for the township was $59,946 (+/− $3,307). About 3.6% of families and 4.9% of the population were below the poverty line, including 5.2% of those under age 18 and 4.7% of those age 65 or over.

=== 2000 census ===
As of the 2000 United States census there were 21,907 people, 7,282 households, and 5,985 families residing in the township. The population density was 842.4 inhabitants per square mile (325.3/km^{2}). There were 7,450 housing units at an average density of 286.5 per square mile (110.6/km^{2}). The racial makeup of the township was 71.53% White, 2.76% African American, 0.08% Native American, 22.76% Asian, 0.01% Pacific Islander, 1.08% from other races, and 1.78% from two or more races. Hispanic or Latino of any race were 4.07% of the population.

As of the 2000 Census, 8.31% of West Windsor's residents identified themselves as being of Chinese ancestry. This was the fourth highest percentage of people with Chinese ancestry in any place in New Jersey with 1,000 or more residents identifying their ancestry.

There were 7,282 households, out of which 50.4% had children under the age of 18 living with them, 75.3% were married couples living together, 5.1% had a female householder with no husband present, and 17.8% were non-families. 14.6% of all households were made up of individuals, and 2.8% had someone living alone who was 65 years of age or older. The average household size was 3.01 and the average family size was 3.36.

In the township the population was spread out, with 31.8% under the age of 18, 4.4% from 18 to 24, 31.4% from 25 to 44, 26.2% from 45 to 64, and 6.2% who were 65 years of age or older. The median age was 37 years. For every 100 females, there were 98.3 males. For every 100 females age 18 and over, there were 95.8 males.

The median income for a household in the township was $116,335, and the median income for a family was $127,877. Males had a median income of $100,000 versus $56,002 for females. The per capita income for the township was $48,511. About 2.0% of families and 2.5% of the population were below the poverty line, including 2.4% of those under age 18 and 2.3% of those age 65 or over.

== Economy ==
West Windsor's economy includes a mix of corporate, retail and local services. NRG Energy, a company specializing in electricity generation and retail, has its corporate headquarters located in West Windsor.

The township benefits from its proximity to New York City and Philadelphia, making it an attractive location for businesses and sectors such as finance, technology, and healthcare. Several small and medium-sized enterprises operate within the township, ranging from local startups to regional offices of larger corporations. Retail centers, such as the MarketFair in West Windsor, and the nearby Quaker Bridge Mall in Lawrence Township, also drive commerce and attract customers from surrounding communities.

Agriculture remains a small but notable part of West Windsor's economy, with local farms contributing to the region's farmers' markets and community-supported agriculture programs. These farms offer fresh produce and promote agricultural practices that appeal to environmentally-conscious residents. The township's support for green initiatives and environmentally-friendly policies has also made it an appealing place for businesses and residents focused on sustainability.

== Arts and culture ==
The West Windsor Arts Center is the junction where the arts and community meet. They offer performances, classes, workshops, exhibitions, literary arts events and various other special events. It is located in the historic Princeton Junction Firehouse.

The Mercer County Italian-American Festival, established in 2000 and held annually in West Windsor, celebrated its 20th annual event in September 2019.

=== MCTV 26 ===
Mercer County Television channel 26 is an Educational-access television station in West Windsor that is owned and operated by Mercer County Community College. The student television station is transmitted to all of Mercer County, New Jersey, via cable TV channel 26 on Xfinity and Optimum, reaching an excess of 90,000 households. MCTV was added as Verizon FiOS channel 20 in Mercer County starting in 2009.

== Parks and recreation ==
Richard J. Coffee Mercer County Park is located on Old Trenton Road. Administered by the Mercer County Park Commission and located primarily in West Windsor, it has athletic fields, a dog park, picnic grounds, a newly renovated boathouse and marina on Mercer Lake, bike trails and an ice skating rink that is home to the Mercer Bulldogs special hockey team.

The West Windsor Community Park is a 123-acre (50 ha) public park which serves as the primary park for active recreation. Facilities include a playground, jogging/bicycling paths, basketball courts, dog parks, a skate park, tennis courts and pickleball courts. This park also features 3 baseball fields and an indoor baseball facility where many children go to train. The park is also home to the West Windsor Waterworks Family Aquatics Center.

Duck Pond Park is a 120-acre (49 ha) park under construction located off Meadow Road between the intersections with Clarksville Road and Bear Brook Road, bordering Duck Pond Run. It is designed to be a "second community park" for the township. As of 2015, lighted soccer fields have been completed and in use by the West Windsor–Plainsboro Soccer Association, as well as tennis, volleyball and basketball courts. Future plans include a playground, picnic areas, an amphitheater, and a fishing pond.

== Government ==
=== Local government ===
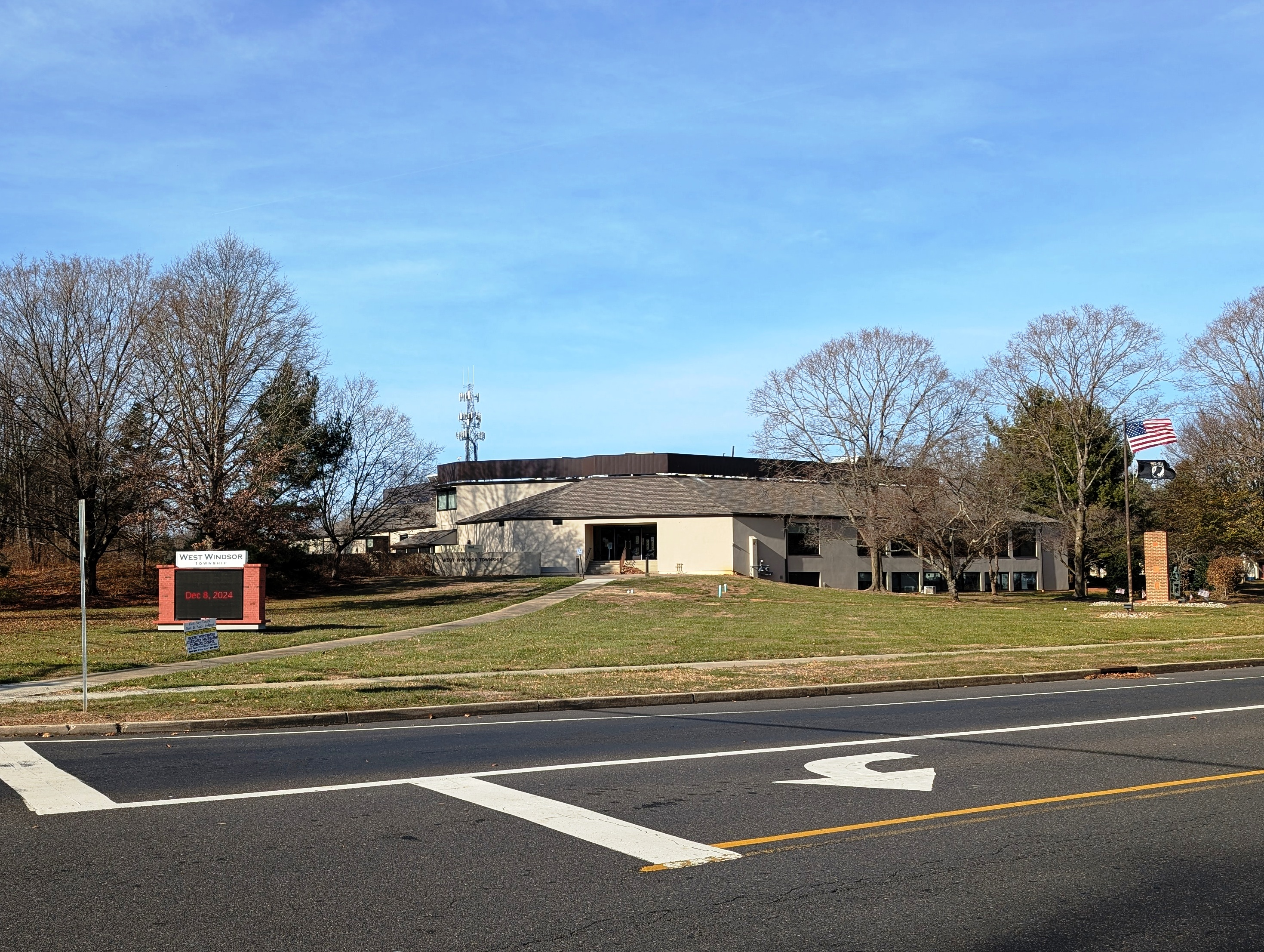
West Windsor Township municipal building

West Windsor is governed under the Faulkner Act (formally known as the Optional Municipal Charter Law) within the mayor-council form of New Jersey municipal government (Plan 6), implemented based on the recommendations of a Charter Study Commission as of July 1, 1993. The township is one of 71 municipalities (of the 564) statewide that use this form of government. From the time of its formation in 1797, until 1993, the township was governed by a township committee, which combined both executive and legislative authority. In May 1993, West Windsor residents voted to change their form of government to a Faulkner Act form of government.

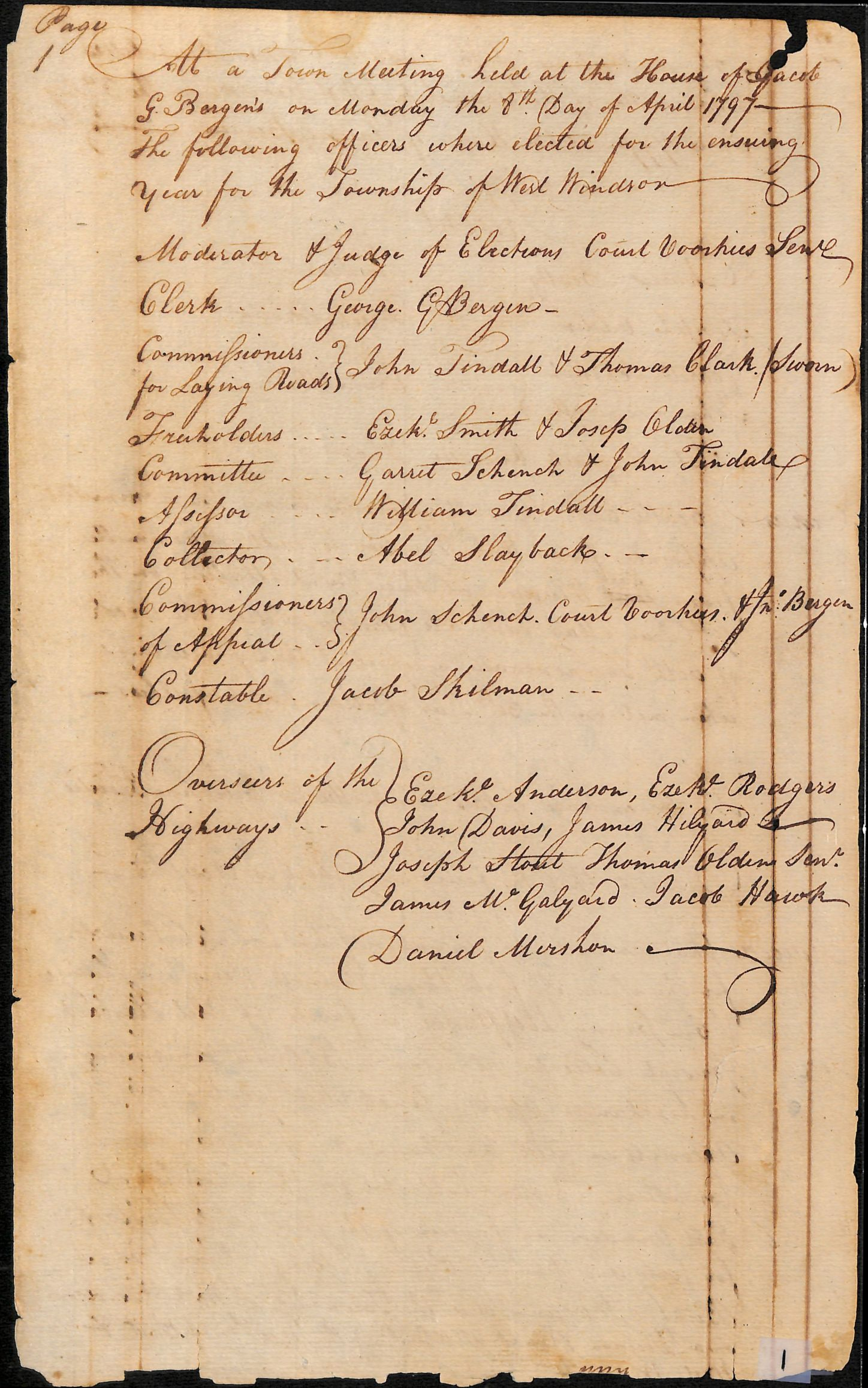
First township minutes from April 8, 1797. At this meeting, the original township officers were elected. Followed the township's February 9, 1797 formation.

The governing body is comprised of the Mayor and the five-member Township Council. Under the township's mayor-council form of government, the mayor and council function as independent branches of government. The mayor is the chief executive of the township and heads its administration. The mayor is elected in a non-partisan election and serves for a four-year term. The mayor may attend council meetings but is not obligated to do so. The council is the legislative branch. The five members of the township council are elected on a non-partisan basis for four-year terms on a staggered basis, with either two seats (and the mayoral seat) or three seats up for vote in odd-numbered years as part of the November general election. At the annual organizational meeting held during the first week of January of each year, the Council elects a president and vice president to serve for one-year terms. The council president chairs the meetings of the governing body. Starting in 2011, the township's elections were shifted from May to November as part of an effort to lower costs of running standalone municipal elections and as part of an effort to increase voter participation.

As of 2026, the mayor of West Windsor is Hemant Marathe, whose term of office ends January 14, 2030. Marathe is the first Indian-American to serve as the township's mayor. Members of the West Windsor Township Council are Council President Sonia Gawas (2027), Council Vice President Andrea Mandel (2027), Joe Charles (2029), Linda Geevers (2029) and Daniel Weiss (2027).

In June 2017, council president Peter Mendonez resigned from office. Council vice president Allison Miller was chosen to serve as acting council president and Jyotika Bahree was appointed to fill the vacant seat left by Miller expiring in December 2019. In the November 2018 general election, Yingchao "YZ" Zhang was elected to serve the balance of the term of office.

In June 2015, the township council selected Hemant Marathe to fill the vacant seat expiring December 2015 of Kristina Samonte, who had resigned from office in the previous month as she was relocating out of the township.

=== Federal, state and county representation ===
West Windsor is located in the 12th Congressional District and is part of New Jersey's 15th state legislative district.

For the 119th United States Congress, New Jersey's 12th congressional district is represented by Bonnie Watson Coleman (D, Ewing Township). New Jersey is represented in the United States Senate by Democrats Cory Booker (Newark, term ends 2027) and Andy Kim (Moorestown, term ends 2031).

For the 2026–2027 session, the 15th legislative district of the New Jersey Legislature is represented in the State Senate by Shirley Turner (D, Lawrence Township) and in the General Assembly by Verlina Reynolds-Jackson (D, Trenton) and Anthony Verrelli (D, Hopewell Township).

Mercer County is governed by a County Executive who oversees the day-to-day operations of the county and by a seven-member Board of County Commissioners that acts in a legislative capacity, setting policy. All officials are chosen at-large in partisan elections, with the executive serving a four-year term of office while the commissioners serve three-year terms of office on a staggered basis, with either two or three seats up for election each year as part of the November general election. As of 2025, the County Executive is Daniel R. Benson (D, Hamilton Township) whose term of office ends December 31, 2027. Mercer County's Commissioners are:

Lucylle R. S. Walter (D, Ewing Township, 2026), Chair John A. Cimino (D, Hamilton Township, 2026), Samuel T. Frisby Sr. (D, Trenton, 2027), Cathleen M. Lewis (D, Lawrence Township, 2025), Vice Chair Kristin L. McLaughlin (D, Hopewell Township, 2027), Nina D. Melker (D, Hamilton Township, 2025) and Terrance Stokes (D, Ewing Township, 2027).

Mercer County's constitutional officers are: Clerk Paula Sollami-Covello (D, Lawrence Township, 2025), Sheriff John A. Kemler (D, Hamilton Township, 2026) and Surrogate Diane Gerofsky (D, Lawrence Township, 2026).

=== Politics ===
As of March 2011, there were a total of 16,034 registered voters in West Windsor, of which 5,384 (33.6%) were registered as Democrats, 2,968 (18.5%) were registered as Republicans and 7,672 (47.8%) were registered as unaffiliated. There were 10 voters registered as Libertarians or Greens.

United States presidential election results for West Windsor
Year	Republican		Democratic		Third party(ies)	
Year	No.	%	No.	%	No.	%
2024	3,581	25.63%	9,927	71.06%	462	3.31%
2020	3,423	22.15%	11,821	76.50%	208	1.35%
2016	3,197	24.56%	9,415	72.33%	404	3.10%
2012	4,401	35.73%	7,769	63.07%	148	1.20%
2008	4,092	33.78%	7,895	65.18%	125	1.03%
2004	4,596	40.22%	6,753	59.09%	79	0.69%

In the 2012 presidential election, Democrat Barack Obama received 63.1% of the vote (7,769 cast), ahead of Republican Mitt Romney with 35.7% (4,401 votes), and other candidates with 1.2% (148 votes), among the 14,045 ballots cast by the township's 17,891 registered voters (1,727 ballots were spoiled), for a turnout of 78.5%. In the 2008 presidential election, Obama received 64.3% of the vote (7,895 cast), ahead of Republican John McCain with 33.3% (4,092 votes) and other candidates with 1.0% (125 votes), among the 12,273 ballots cast by the township's 16,548 registered voters, for a turnout of 74.2%.

Gubernatorial election results for West Windsor
Year	Republican		Democratic		Third party(ies)	
Year	No.	%	No.	%	No.	%
2025	2,646	23.90%	8,353	75.44%	73	0.66%
2021	2,445	27.62%	6,324	71.43%	84	0.95%
2017	2,710	32.86%	5,399	65.46%	139	1.69%
2013	4,983	62.97%	2,793	35.30%	137	1.73%
2009	3,436	43.70%	3,918	49.83%	508	6.46%
2005	3,414	44.14%	4,144	53.58%	176	2.28%

In the 2013 gubernatorial election, Republican Chris Christie received 63.0% of the vote (4,983 cast), ahead of Democrat Barbara Buono with 35.3% (2,793 votes), and other candidates with 1.7% (137 votes), among the 8,181 ballots cast by the township's 17,648 registered voters (268 ballots were spoiled), for a turnout of 46.4%. In the 2009 gubernatorial election, Democrat Jon Corzine received 49.5% of the vote (3,918 ballots cast), ahead of Republican Chris Christie with 43.4% (3,436 votes), Independent Chris Daggett with 6.0% (474 votes) and other candidates with 0.4% (34 votes), among the 7,914 ballots cast by the township's 16,267 registered voters, yielding a 48.7% turnout.

United States Senate election results for West Windsor1
Year	Republican		Democratic		Third party(ies)	
Year	No.	%	No.	%	No.	%
2024	3,431	25.06%	9,848	71.93%	413	3.02%
2018	2,808	31.34%	5,888	65.71%	264	2.95%
2012	4,189	35.56%	7,369	62.56%	222	1.88%
2006	2,950	39.10%	4,485	59.45%	109	1.44%

United States Senate election results for West Windsor2
Year	Republican		Democratic		Third party(ies)	
Year	No.	%	No.	%	No.	%
2020	3,970	25.94%	11,200	73.19%	133	0.87%
2014	2,171	34.00%	4,094	64.11%	121	1.89%
2013	1,562	32.65%	3,172	66.30%	50	1.05%
2008	4,576	40.24%	6,601	58.05%	195	1.71%

== Education ==
=== Colleges and universities ===
West Windsor is the site of the West Windsor Campus of Mercer County Community College.

Princeton University's satellite campus is located in West Windsor.

=== Public ===
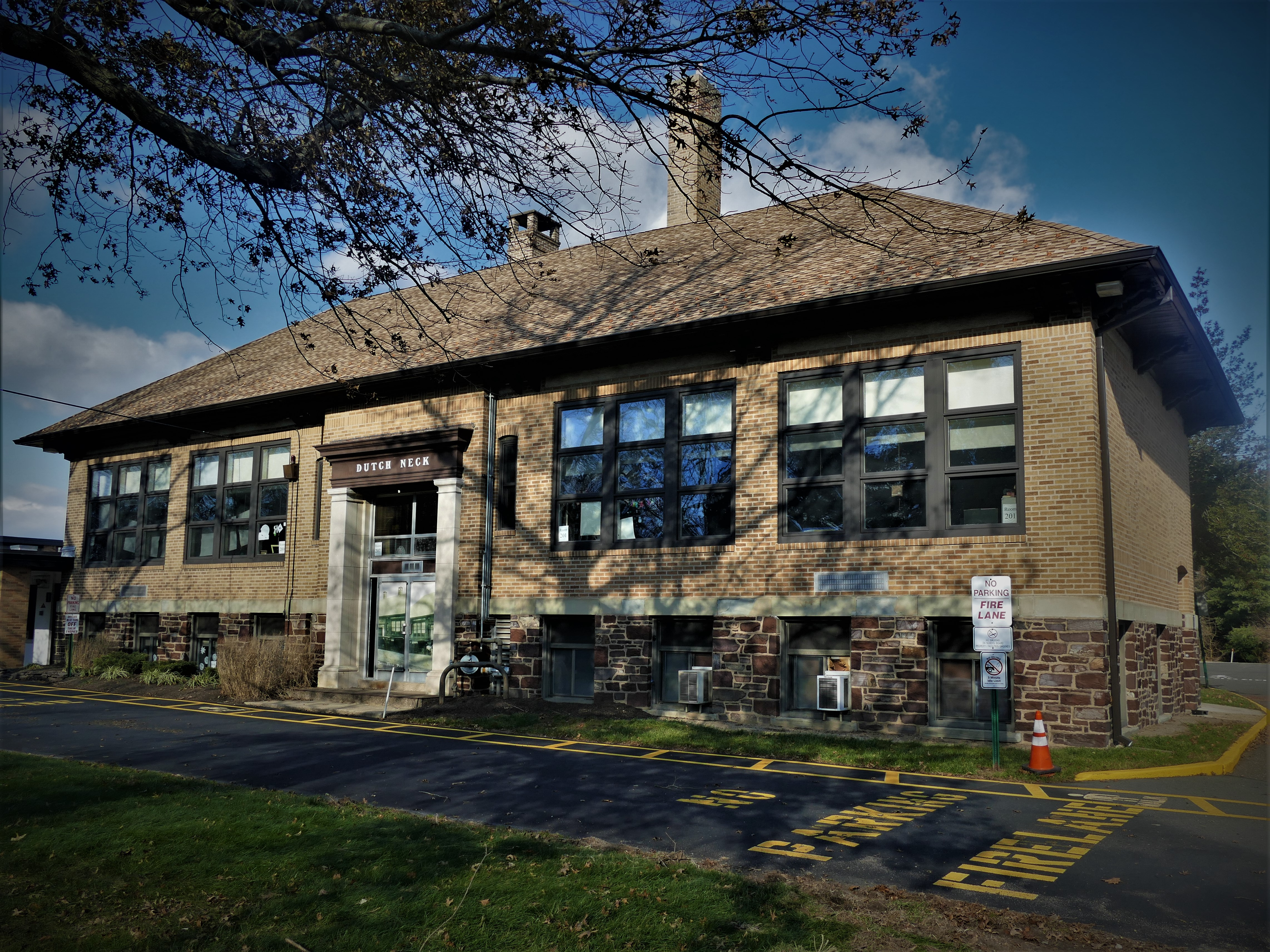
Dutch Neck Elementary School in December 2018. Constructed in 1917 to replace the township's 1 and 2-room school houses, in use since the mid-1700s.

West Windsor and Plainsboro are part of a shared regional school district, the West Windsor-Plainsboro Regional School District, which serves students in pre-kindergarten through twelfth grade from the two communities. There are four elementary schools (grades PreK/K - 3), two upper elementary schools (grades 4 and 5), two middle schools (grades 6 - 8) and two high schools (grades 9 - 12). As of the 2024–25 school year, the district, comprised of 10 schools, had an enrollment of 8,900 students and 775.8 classroom teachers (on an FTE basis), for a student–teacher ratio of 11.5:1. Schools in the district (with 2024–25 enrollment data from the National Center for Education Statistics) are Dutch Neck Elementary School (located in West Windsor: 557 students; in grades K-3), Maurice Hawk Elementary School (West Windsor: 723; PreK-3), Town Center Elementary School (Plainsboro: 439; PreK-3), J.V.B. Wicoff Elementary School (Plainsboro: 334; K-3), Millstone River School (Plainsboro: 772; 3-5), Village School (West Windsor: 657; 4-5), Community Middle School (Plainsboro: 1,029; 6-8), Thomas R. Grover Middle School (West Windsor: 1,183; 6-8), West Windsor-Plainsboro High School North (Plainsboro: 1,510; 9-12) and West Windsor-Plainsboro High School South (West Windsor: 1,627; 9-12). The district is overseen by a directly elected nine-member board of education whose seats are allocated to the two constituent municipalities based on population, with five of the nine seats allocated to West Windsor.

Three of the district's schools have been recognized by the National Blue Ribbon Schools Program. West Windsor-Plainsboro High School South was recognized during the 1992–1993 school year and Maurice Hawk Elementary School was recognized in 1993–1994, while West Windsor-Plainsboro High School North was recognized in the 2006–2007 school year.

Eighth grade students from all of Mercer County are eligible to apply to attend the high school programs offered by the Mercer County Technical Schools, a county-wide vocational school district that offers full-time career and technical education at its Health Sciences Academy, STEM Academy and Academy of Culinary Arts, with no tuition charged to students for attendance.

=== Private ===
The Wilberforce School, a K–12 school founded in 2005 that offers a Classical Christian education, moved to new facilities in the township in 2014.

== Infrastructure ==
=== Transportation ===
==== Roads and highways ====
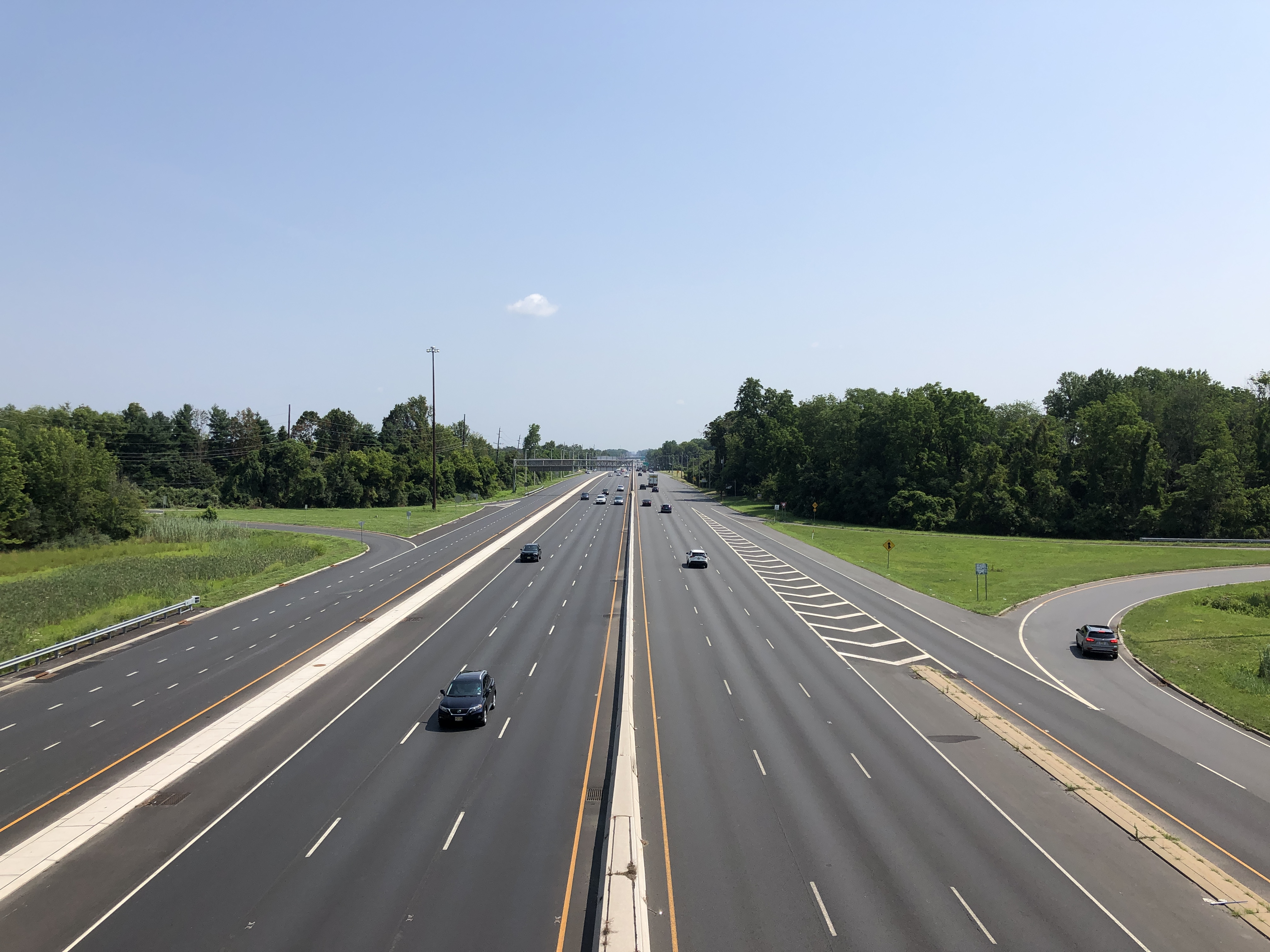
U.S. Route 1 in West Windsor

As of 2010, the township had a total of 151.84 miles (244.36 km) of roadways, of which 123.43 miles (198.64 km) were maintained by the municipality, 24.16 miles (38.88 km) by Mercer County and 4.25 miles (6.84 km) by the New Jersey Department of Transportation.

U.S. Route 1 is the largest and busiest highway in West Windsor, crossing the northwestern sections of the township, oriented southwest to northeast. CR 533 (Quakerbridge Road) passes along the western border with Lawrence. CR 526 and CR 571 are multiplexed together from the northwestern part of the township until they split in the center of the municipality. CR 535 passes through in the south and serves Mercer County Community College. Route 64 is a short, unsigned state highway that runs 0.32 miles (0.51 km) concurrent with CR 526/CR 571 where they cross the Northeast Corridor rail line.

Other major roads that are accessible in neighboring municipalities include: Interstate 295 in Hamilton and Lawrence, Interstate 195 in Hamilton and Robbinsville, and the New Jersey Turnpike (Interstate 95) in Robbinsville (Exit 7A) and East Windsor (Exit 8).

==== Public transportation ====
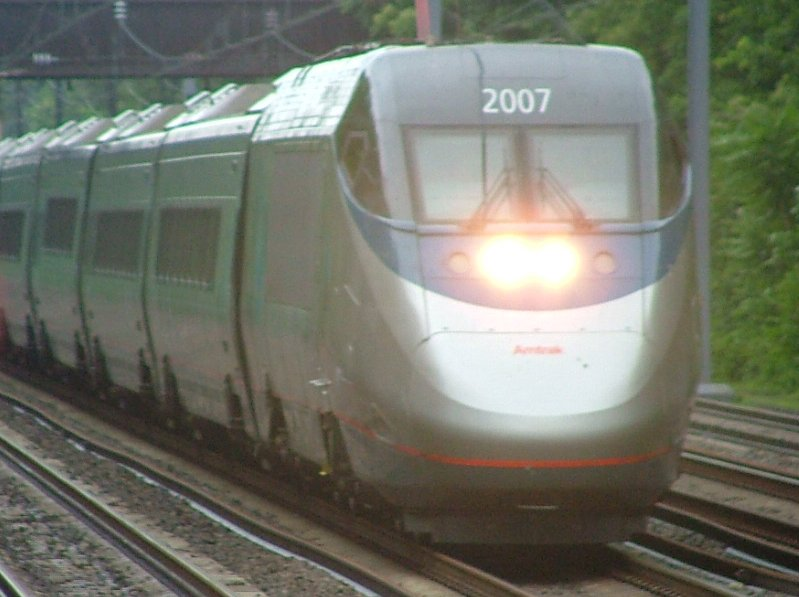
An Acela Express speeding through West Windsor.

Princeton Junction station offers commuter rail service in the township. Service is provided by NJ Transit on the Northeast Corridor Line to Newark Penn Station, Secaucus Junction and New York Penn Station. Amtrak's Keystone Service and Northeast Regional routes stop at Princeton Junction which is ranked as one of the ten busiest train stations in the Northeast. The station had 4,271 average weekday boardings in 2025, the fifth-highest of any NJ Transit station in the state.

Running between the Princeton Junction station and the Princeton station is what is known to locals as the "Dinky." The Dinky is a one-car train that shuttles back and forth many times a day between the two stations. Traveling 2.7 miles (4.3 km) each way, it is the shortest regularly scheduled passenger route in the United States.

NJ Transit bus service to Trenton is provided via the 600, 603, 609, with other area service on the 605 route.

The Greater Mercer Transportation Management Association offers service on Route 130 between the West Windsor Campus of Mercer County Community College and East Windsor Township / Hightstown.

=== Healthcare ===
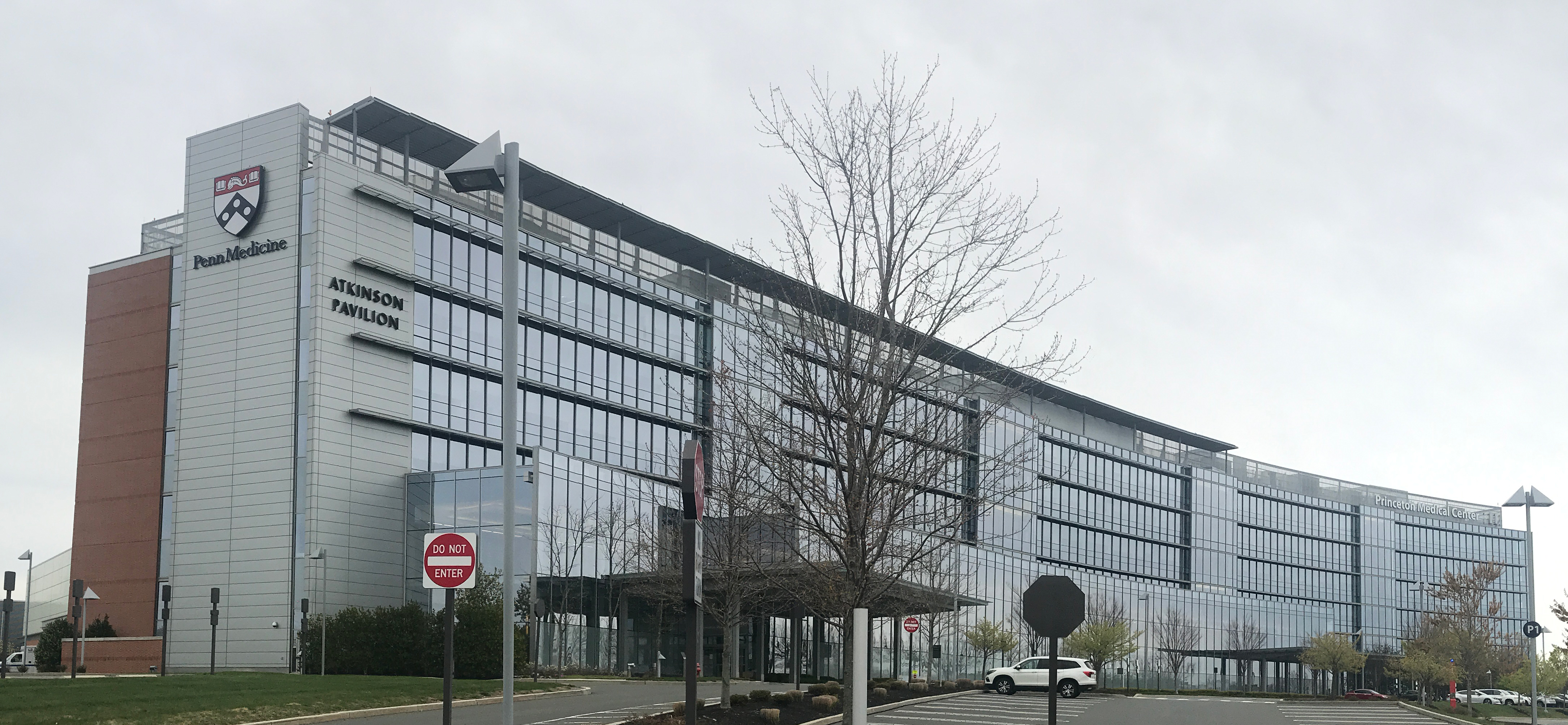
Penn Medicine Princeton Medical Center

Penn Medicine Princeton Medical Center is a 355-bed regional non-profit, tertiary and academic medical center located in neighboring Plainsboro Township. The hospital services the greater Princeton region in Central Jersey. It is owned by the Penn Medicine Health System and is the only such hospital in the state of New Jersey. The PMC network offers a wide array of services at its main campus location in Plainsboro, along with its network of primary and specialty care through its family-based physician practice locations across Central Jersey. One of those physician practices has a primary and specialty care unit in West Windsor, located on Princeton-Hightstown Road.

Other nearby regional hospitals and healthcare networks that are accessible to the township include CentraState Medical Center in nearby Freehold Township, the Old Bridge Township division of Raritan Bay Medical Center, and the Hamilton Township division of Robert Wood Johnson University Hospital. Saint Peter's University Hospital and Robert Wood Johnson University Hospital are also located nearby in New Brunswick.

== Notable people ==
People who were born in, residents of, or otherwise closely associated with West Windsor include:

- Jack Aker (born 1940), former Major League Baseball pitcher who played for the New York Yankees and New York Mets
- Kevin Barry (born 1978), former Atlanta Braves relief pitcher
- Kevin G. Chapman, author and attorney
- Aneesh Chopra (born 1972), first Chief Technology Officer of the United States
- Stanley Dancer (1927–2005), harness racing driver and trainer
- Eileen Filler-Corn (born 1964), member of the Virginia House of Delegates since 2010 who was chosen in 2019 to become the first woman to serve as Speaker
- Douglas Forrester (born 1953), former mayor of West Windsor Township who was the Republican Party nominee for U.S. Senator in 2002 and for Governor of New Jersey in 2005
- John W. Hartmann (born 1967), politician who served in the New Jersey General Assembly from the 15th Legislative District from 1992 to 1994
- Ethan Hawke (born 1970), actor
- Sachidananda Kangovi (born 1948), engineer and author
- Katie Kellner (born 1991), distance runner and coach who specializes in the marathon
- Kris Kolluri (born c. 1969), former Commissioner of the New Jersey Department of Transportation
- Matt Lalli (born 1986), professional lacrosse player for the Boston Cannons of Major League Lacrosse
- Paul Lansky (born 1944), composer
- Ben H. Love (1930–2010), the eighth Chief Scout Executive of the Boy Scouts of America serving from 1985 to 1993
- Brad Mays (born 1955), screenwriter, award-winning stage and film director
- Ramesses McGuiness (born 2000), footballer who plays for the U.S. Virgin Islands national team
- Christopher McQuarrie (born 1968), screenwriter, director and producer who is a regular collaborator of director Bryan Singer, with whom he co-wrote the screenplay of Singer's Public Access, wrote the screenplay for The Usual Suspects, co-wrote and produced Valkyrie and co-wrote Jack the Giant Slayer and Edge of Tomorrow
- Lyle and Erik Menendez (born 1968), notorious 1990s California convicted criminals
- Glenn Michibata (born 1962), retired professional tennis player who has been tennis coach of the Princeton Tigers
- James Murphy (born 1970), singer, songwriter, DJ, electronic musician (as LCD Soundsystem)
- John Forbes Nash Jr. (1928–2015), Nobel Prize-winning mathematician who was the subject of the film A Beautiful Mind
- Taktin Oey (born 1986), composer
- Fernando Perez (born 1983), former Tampa Bay Rays outfielder, current San Francisco Giants coach
- Steve Rogers (born 1949), former MLB pitcher who played for the Montreal Expos
- Bryan Singer (born 1965), film and television director
- David Zhuang (born 1963), Olympic table tennis player
