= Cranberry (disambiguation) =

The cranberry is a group of evergreen dwarf shrubs, bearing the fruit named after such.

Cranberry may also refer to:

== Places ==
=== Canada ===
- Cranberry, British Columbia, a community
- Cranberry Portage, Manitoba, a community

=== United States ===
- Cranberry Isles, Maine
- Cranberry Street Tunnel, New York City, New York
- Cranberry Township (disambiguation), the name of five townships in the United States
- Cranberry Wilderness, West Virginia
- Cranberry Prairie, Ohio, an unincorporated community
- Cranberry Glades Botanical Area, West Virginia
- Tannersville Cranberry Bog, a protected bog in Tannersville, Pennsylvania
- Cranberry Lake, Wisconsin, an unincorporated community
- Cranberry Marsh, Wisconsin, an unincorporated community
- Cranberry, Luzerne County, Pennsylvania, an unincorporated community
- Cranberry, Venango County, Pennsylvania, an unincorporated community

== Waters ==
- Cranberry River (disambiguation)
- Cranberry Lake, New York, United States
- Cranberry Lake (Nova Scotia) (disambiguation), Canada
- Little Cranberry Lake (disambiguation)

== Things ==
- Cranberry sauce, a sauce or relish made out of cranberries
- Cranberry glass, a red glass
- Cranberry morpheme, a type of bound morpheme in linguistic morphology
- Ugni molinae, a fruit marketed as 'New Zealand cranberry'
- Cranberry bean, a variety of common bean (Phaseolus vulgaris)
- Viburnum opulus, known as the European Cranberrybush

== Music ==
- The Cranberries, an Irish rock band

== See also ==
- Cranbury (disambiguation)
