= Cranbury =

Cranbury may refer to:

- Cranbury, New Jersey, a township in Middlesex County, NJ, USA
  - Cranbury (CDP), New Jersey, an unincorporated community within the township
    - Cranbury Road, the main road in the community
  - Cranbury School District, a school board in the township
- Cranbury (Norwalk), a neighborhood in Norwalk, Fairfield County, Connecticut, USA
- Cranbury Brook, a tributary of the Millstone River, in New Jersey, USA

== Other uses ==
- Cranbury Station, New Jersey, an unincorporated community in Cranbury Township, NJ, USA
- Cranbury Park, a country estate and mansion in England, UK

== See also ==
- Cranberry (disambiguation)
