= Little Cranberry Lake =

Little Cranberry Lake may refer to:

- Canada
  - Little Cranberry Lake (Annapolis)
  - Little Cranberry Lake (Digby)
  - Little Cranberry Lake (Halifax)
- United States
  - Little Cranberry Lake, Washington
