= Wortendyke Barn =

- U.S. National Register of Historic Places
- New Jersey Register of Historic Places
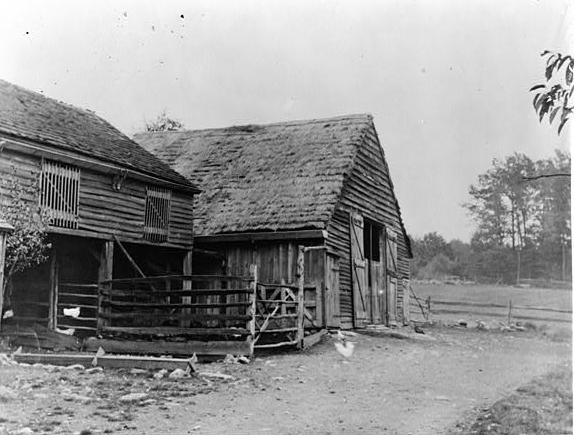

- Location within Bergen County, New Jersey Location within New Jersey Location within the United States
- Location: 13 Pascack Road, Park Ridge, New Jersey
- Coordinates: 41.02880°N 74.04540°W
- Area: 0.5 acres (0.20 ha)
- Built: 1770
- Architectural style: Lower Rhenish
- NRHP reference No.: 73001081
- NJRHP No.: 630

Significant dates
- Added to NRHP: May 07, 1973
- Designated NJRHP: August 2, 1972

Wortendyke Barn, at 13 Pascack Road in Park Ridge, Bergen County, New Jersey, United States, was built in 1770 and added to the National Register of Historic Places on August 2, 1972. The historic Dutch barn was restored by Bergen County in 1973. The barn is home to the Wortendyke Barn Museum. The museum contains an exhibit on the development of agriculture in Bergen County.

== See also ==
- National Register of Historic Places listings in Bergen County, New Jersey
- List of museums in New Jersey
- Updike Parsonage Barn
- List of the oldest buildings in New Jersey
