= Cranberry Township =

Cranberry Township is the name of four townships in the United States:

- Cranberry Township, Butler County, Pennsylvania
- Cranberry, Venango County, Pennsylvania
- Cranberry Township, Alleghany County, North Carolina
- Cranberry Township, Avery County, North Carolina
- Cranberry Township, Ohio
