= Anacortes Community Forest Lands =

- IUCN category IV (habitat/species management area)
- Location within the United States
- Location: Washington, USA
- Nearest city: Anacortes
- Coordinates: 48°28′3.87″N 122°37′46.13″W
- Area: 2,800 acres (11 km^{2})
- Established: 1919
- Governing body: Anacortes City Council

Anacortes Community Forest Lands (ACFL) consists of mostly forested lands surrounding and adjoining Little Cranberry, Heart, and Whistle Lakes on Fidalgo Island, west and south of Anacortes, Washington. Its highest point is Mount Erie, the highest point on the island at 1,273 feet (388 m). Sugarloaf, 1,044 feet (318 m) and 0.6 miles (1.0 km) north of Mount Erie, is its second highest peak. As well as the aforementioned lakes, ACFL contains a number of smaller lakes, ponds and wetlands.

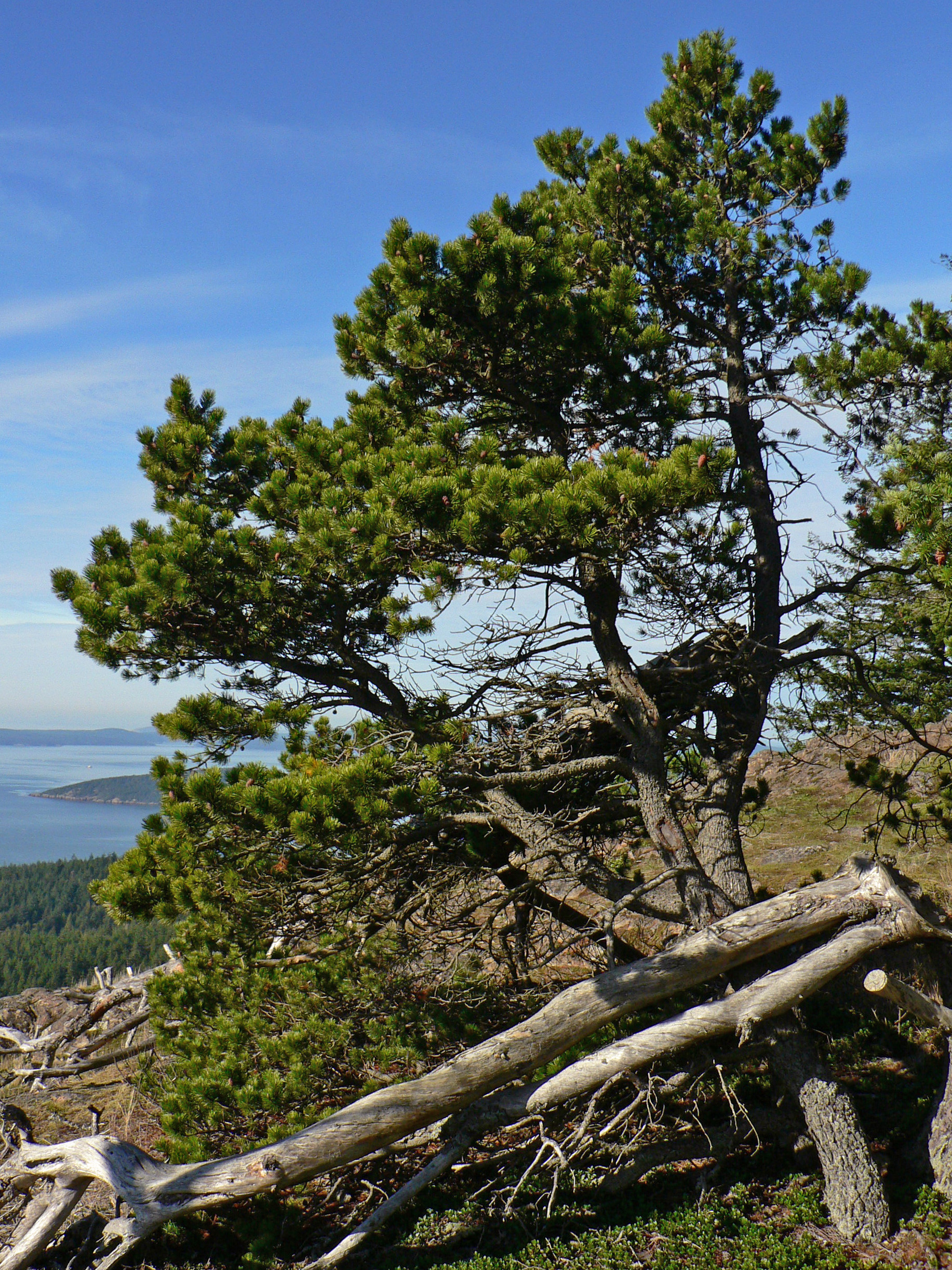
Pinus contorta on Sugarloaf

ACFL originated in the August 2, 1919, purchase by the city of Washington Power, Light and Water Company equipment and lands for $135,000. Prior to 1989, the forest was logged for the revenue that it produced. In the late 1980s, the forest produced little or no net income and a community organization, Friends of the Forest, was formed to oppose logging. Subsequently, a survey by the Parks Department indicated that the community favored non-forestry uses of those lands, and a study showed that the forest trails were highly valued for recreational use. In 1990, the Forest Endowment Fund was started. On April 15, 1991, the City Council ended logging, except to remove downed or dangerous trees, from the permitted uses of the forest. In 1998, a Conservation Easement Program (CEP) was adopted by the city council as a means of funding ACFL and preserving the forest. Contributions to the CEP preserve the forest at a rate of $1000 per acre. The conservation easements are held and monitored by Skagit Land Trust. As of mid-2007, over $1.5 million had been contributed and 1,500 acres (6.1 km^{2}) was preserved.

The forest includes lakes, bogs and wetlands, low mountains and rocky cliffs. Most of the forest has been logged once or twice, but a notable grove of low-elevation old-growth forest remains. The upper story is dominated by Pinaceae (Pine Family) including Pseudotsuga menziesii (Douglas-fir), Tsuga heterophylla (Western Hemlock), Pinus contorta (Shore Pine), and Abies grandis (Grand Fir), as well as Acer macrophyllum (Bigleaf Maple), Arbutus menziesii (Pacific Madrone), and Alnus rubra (Red Alder). Important understory species are Gaultheria shallon (Salal) and Acer circinatum (Vine Maple).
