= Whistle Lake =

Lake in Washington, United States

Whistle lake
- Location within Washington (state) Location within the United States
- Location: Anacortes, Washington
- Coordinates: 48°27′33.55″N 122°36′20.85″W
- Basin countries: United States
- Surface elevation: 440 ft (134 m)

Whistle Lake is a small lake located within city limits in Anacortes Community Forest Lands southeast of central Anacortes, Washington. Though not directly accessible by vehicle, Whistle Lake attracts thousands of visitors each year. The lake may be reached by driving to the trailhead off Whistle Lake Road and hiking or bicycling 1.3 miles along a dirt track.

The scenery surrounding the lake is pleasant and a variety of trails provide opportunities for hikers. The lake itself is used for swimming and fishing; only inflatable rafts and non-motorized boats can be used. Cliffs varying in height from 10 feet to nearly 70 feet attract cliff divers.
