= Charles McKnight =

American surgeon and professor

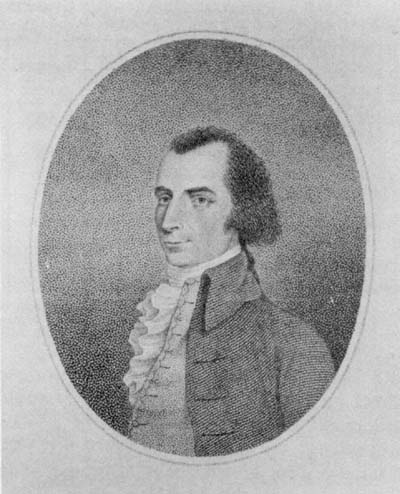
- Pencil drawing of Charles McKnight, made after his death
- Born: 10 October 1750; Cranbury Township, Province of New Jersey
- Died: 16 November 1791 (aged 41); New York City, New York
- Military career
- Allegiance: United States of America
- Branch: Continental Army
- Service years: 1776–1782
- Rank: Surgeon General; Chief Hospital Physician
- Units: Middle Department, Continental Army
- Other work: surgeon and professor at Columbia College

Charles McKnight (October 10, 1750 – November 16, 1791) was an American physician during and after the American Revolutionary War. He served as a surgeon and physician in the Hospital Department of the Continental Army under General George Washington and other subordinate commanders. McKnight was one of the most respected surgeons of his day and was remembered by one colleague as "particularly distinguished as a practical surgeon … at the time of his death (he) was without a rival in that branch of his profession."

== Early life ==
McKnight was born in Cranbury Township in the colonial Province of New Jersey in 1750. His only sibling was his younger brother, Richard. His father, also named Charles McKnight, emigrated to the colonies from Ireland sometime around 1740 and was ordained as a Presbyterian minister in 1742. He became a minister of some note, and was one of the founders and trustees of the College of New Jersey (now Princeton University). Reverend McKnight opposed British governance in Colonial America and was a loud voice for opposition and overthrow of the British government in New Jersey. According to Martha J. Lamb, Reverend McKnight received a severe saber cut to his head in the slashing melee that mortally wounded General Hugh Mercer at the Battle of Princeton. His church at Middletown Point was burned in 1777 and Reverend McKnight was arrested. While in custody aboard the British prison ship HMS Jersey in New York City, Rev. McKnight's health rapidly failed, and he was released shortly before his death on January 1, 1778.

The younger McKnight attended schools in New Jersey and graduated from the College of New Jersey in 1771, in the same class as James Madison, Gunning Bedford Jr., Henry Brackenridge, and Philip Freneau. He was one of the founders of the American Whig Society, along with Brackenridge, Madison, Samuel Stanhope Smith, Bedford, Freneau, John Beatty, John Henry of Maryland, and William Bradford. McKnight studied medicine and surgery privately with eminent Philadelphia surgeon William Shippen, but left before he completed his studies and entered the Continental Army in 1775.

== Continental Army surgeon ==
In late 1775, Benjamin Church, the Director General, assigned McKnight to the Putnam House building, one of six hospitals of the army's Hospital Department in Cambridge, Massachusetts. He remained in that division, which supported Washington's army, until, during a period of great scarcity of medical and surgical supplies for the sick and wounded, McKnight went with other surgeons and physicians to North Castle, New York with Washington's army when the Battle of White Plains began in October 1776. The Continental Army lost the battle, and the British took Fort Washington and Fort Lee, which pushed Washington's ragged army south toward New Jersey in December 1776, which set the stage for the Battle of Trenton.

McKnight remained at North Castle until John Morgan, the Director General, ordered him and Samuel Adams Jr. (the son of Samuel Adams of Massachusetts) to set up a new hospital near Peekskill, New York, for more than 300 sick soldiers of General William Heath's division. Unable to find an acceptable site for a hospital, the two surgeons took over accommodations in Fishkill, New York, twenty miles north of Peekskill. Washington, however, sent convalescents to Peekskill because Morgan told him the hospital was there. Morgan was dismissed as Director General soon thereafter, in January 1777, due to rancor with Washington over supplies and a rampant smallpox epidemic then raging its way through the army. Morgan's management style rankled the surgeons, including McKnight, as Morgan was wrestling with Shippen, McKnight's mentor, over control of the hospitals in New Jersey. Isaac Foster took over temporary supervision of the hospitals on the east side of the Hudson River after Morgan's dismissal at Washington's request.

McKnight served later as a surgeon in the Pennsylvania Battalion of the Flying Camp. On April 11, 1777, he was appointed Surgeon General (also called Senior Surgeon, a subordinate position to Physician General and Director General, not to be confused with Surgeon General of the United States Army) of the Flying Hospital of the Middle Department, which moved with the army during the New York and New Jersey campaign. He served as Senior Surgeon for three years. In December 1779, McKnight was in Morristown, New Jersey with Washington, at the encampment near Jockey Hollow, during the worst winter of the Revolutionary War.

The Hospital Department of the army was reorganized in 1780, and McKnight was promoted to Chief Hospital Physician, the highest medical position of the Middle Department. He served there until he left the army in January 1782. According to records, he was one of the original members of the New York State Society of the Cincinnati.

== Later years and death ==
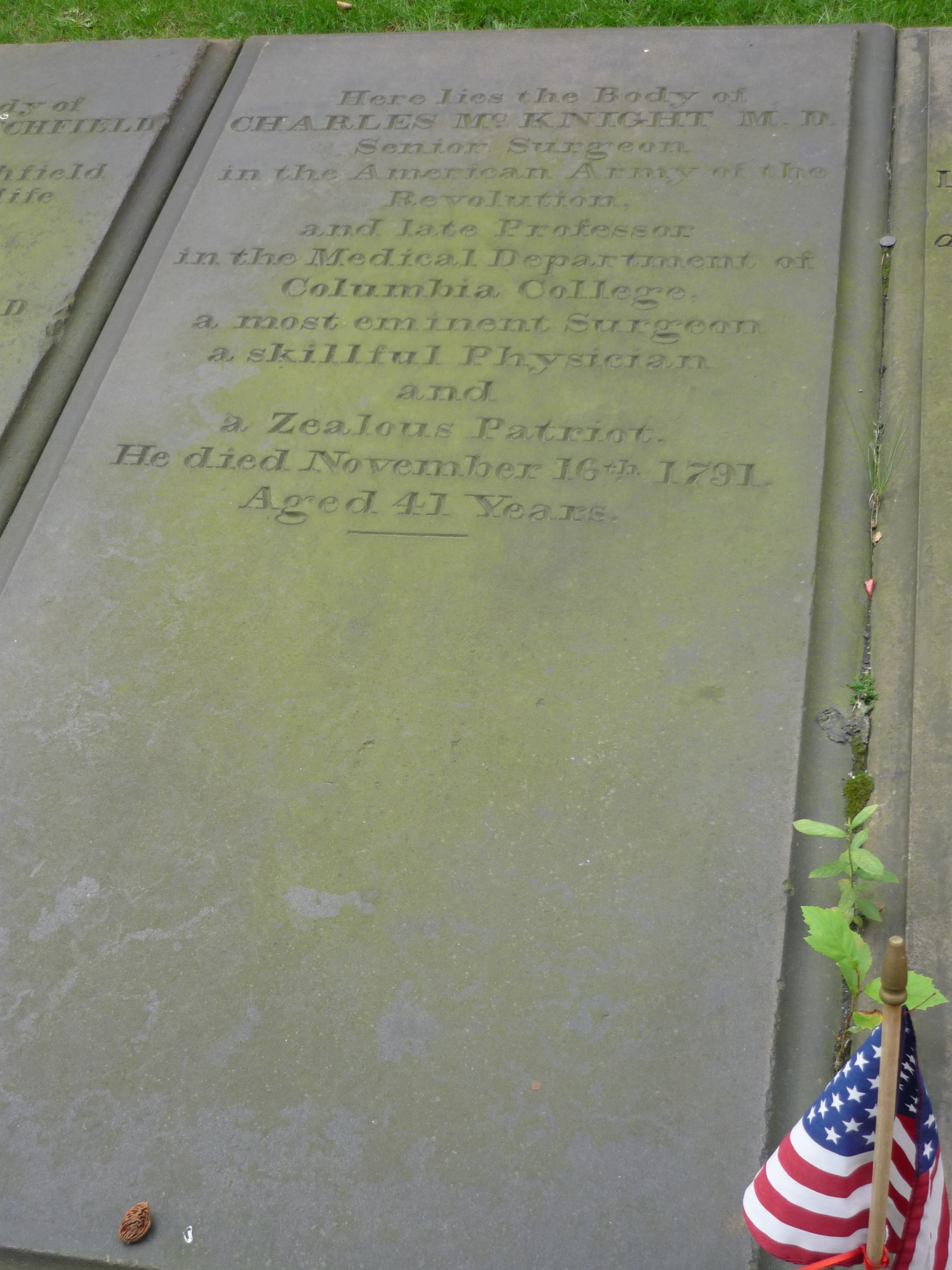
McKnight's grave marker.

After the war ended, McKnight settled in New York City, where he married Mary Morin Scott, daughter of General John Morin Scott. He opened a private practice and was one of the first physicians to use a carriage to visit his patients. McKnight published only one article, the surgical removal of an ectopic pregnancy, but the piece was cited later by the Medical Society of London in its London Medical Observations and Inquiries.

On November 26, 1784, McKnight was appointed one of the first regents of the University of the State of New York. In 1785, McKnight became professor of anatomy and surgery at Columbia College (now the Columbia University College of Physicians and Surgeons), which his father-in-law co-founded. He also was appointed Port Physician of New York. McKnight was remembered as an oculist, and therefore probably performed eye surgery. McKnight maintained a steady surgical practice and held his professorship until his death from pneumonia, the result of an old war injury, on November 16, 1791, at age 41.

McKnight was interred at the corner of Wall Street and Broadway in Lower Manhattan, just beyond the gates of the historic Trinity Churchyard, next to his wife, Mary, and her father. They left four daughters and one son, John Morin Scott McKnight, who also became a physician.

== See also ==
- Ford Mansion
- Morristown National Historical Park
- The Society of the Cincinnati
- American Revolution Institute
