= Cranberry River =

Several rivers are called Cranberry River:

- Cranberry River (Maine)
- Cranberry River (Massachusetts)
- Cranberry River (Michigan)
- Cranberry River (West Virginia)
- Cranberry River (Wisconsin)
- Cranberry River (British Columbia)
- Cranberry River (Ontario)

== See also ==
- Cranberry (disambiguation)
