= Cranbury, New Jersey =

Township in Middlesex County, New Jersey, US

- Township
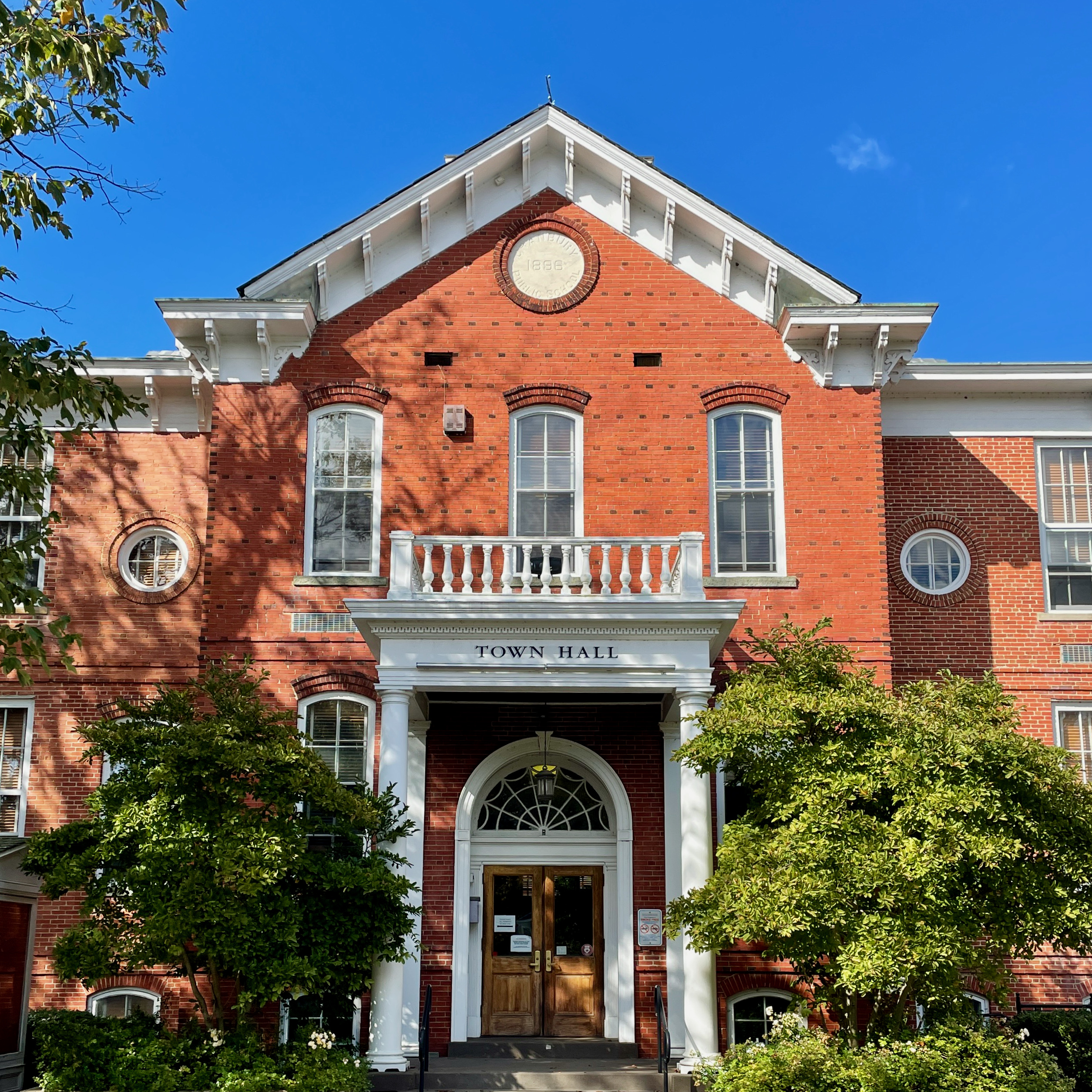
- Cranbury Town Hall, housed in the former Old Cranbury School, a state and federal historic landmark

- Seal

- Location of Cranbury in Middlesex County highlighted in red (left). Inset map: Location of Middlesex County in New Jersey highlighted in orange (right).

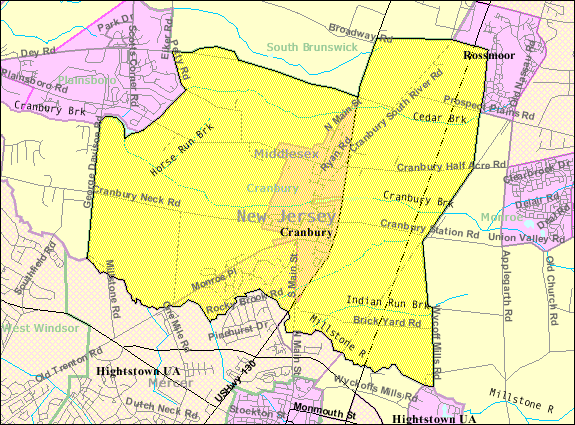
- Census Bureau map of Cranbury Township, New Jersey

- Location in Middlesex County Location in New Jersey Location in the United States
- Coordinates: 40.31345°N 74.520233°W
- Country: United States
- State: New Jersey
- County: Middlesex
- Incorporated: March 7, 1872

Government
  - Type: Township
  - Body: Township Committee
  - Mayor: Lisa Knierim (D, term ends December 31, 2026)
  - Administrator: Denise Marabello
  - Municipal clerk: Debra A. Rubin

Area
  - Total: 13.43 sq mi (34.79 km^{2})
  - Land: 13.28 sq mi (34.40 km^{2})
  - Water: 0.15 sq mi (0.39 km^{2}) 1.12%
  - Rank: 181st of 565 in state 9th of 25 in county
- Elevation: 82 ft (25 m)

Population (2020)
  - Total: 3,842
  - Estimate (2023): 3,960
  - Rank: 418th of 565 in state 24th of 25 in county
  - Density: 289.2/sq mi (111.7/km^{2})
  - Rank: 479th of 565 in state 25th of 25 in county
- Time zone: UTC−05:00 (Eastern (EST))
  - Summer (DST): UTC−04:00 (Eastern (EDT))
- ZIP Codes: 08512
- Area codes: 609 and 640
- FIPS code: 3402315550
- GNIS feature ID: 0882160
- Website: www.cranburytownship.org

Cranbury is a township in southern Middlesex County, within the U.S. state of New Jersey. As of the 2020 United States census, the township's population was 3,842, a decrease of 15 (−0.4%) from the 2010 census count of 3,857, which in turn reflected an increase of 630 (+19.5%) from the 3,227 counted in the 2000 census.

Located within the Raritan Valley region, Cranbury is roughly equidistant between New York City and Philadelphia, contributing to it being a regional historical, cultural, and commercial hub of Central New Jersey (the township is known for its logistics industry) and as an outer-ring commuter suburb of New York City within the New York metropolitan area. The municipal taxes generated by warehouse and industrial properties have helped to keep residential property taxes steady over time.

== History ==
A deed for a sale of land and improvements dated March 1, 1698, is the earliest evidence of buildings constructed in present-day Cranbury. A home in Cranbury was used by Alexander Hamilton and the Marquis de Lafayette as a headquarters during the American Revolutionary War, and they were visited by General George Washington on June 26, 1778. It was during this visit, when George Washington hedged out plans to intercept the British's retreat from Philadelphia to New York City, during the tail end of Britain's Philadelphia campaign. This continued pursuit led to the fated events of the Battle of Monmouth (which took place nearby in modern-day Freehold Township and Manalapan Township, preserved currently as Monmouth Battlefield State Park), a major turning point for the Revolutionary War. As part of orders issued during the presidency of George Washington, maps of Cranbury were made showing the presence of a church, a mill and 25 other buildings. Fleeing after he killed Alexander Hamilton in their 1804 duel, Aaron Burr stopped in Cranbury to exchange horses and eat at a local inn.

During its earliest years, the location was usually spelled as "Cranberry". Rev. Joseph G. Symmes argued in 1857 that the name was spelled improperly and that the suffix "bury" was more appropriate, leading the name of the community and brook to be changed to "Cranbury" in 1869. The name has been attributed to wild cranberries that grew in the area. The so-called Hightstown rail accident occurred in or near Cranbury, in 1833. According to John Quincy Adams, who was aboard the train and who wrote in his diary about it, the train was 3 miles (4.8 km) from Hightstown when the disaster struck, putting the accident near what is now Cranbury Station. Among the passengers aboard were Tyrone Power and Cornelius Vanderbilt.

Cranbury was incorporated as a township by an act of the New Jersey Legislature on March 7, 1872, from portions of both Monroe Township and South Brunswick Township. Portions of the township were taken on April 1, 1919, to form Plainsboro Township. The township celebrated its tricentennial in 1998. Updike Parsonage Barn, originally constructed c. 1759, was disassembled, relocated and reconstructed in 2010 at its current location in Barn Park.

Cranbury, along with the municipalities of Bellmawr, Egg Harbor Township, Montclair, and Woodbridge Township, were the original five municipalities that had authorized dispensaries for the sale of medical cannabis in their municipality in 2017, years before the legal sale of recreational cannabis began in 2022. In July 2021 the township unanimously passed a new ordinance that banned all types of recreational cannabis licenses within the municipality.

The Cranbury Historical and Preservation Society saved the 1713 East Jersey Cottage from demolition and had the building relocated across Old Trenton Road, onto its original 1693 Fullerton tract, the 1752 Philipse property and the 1760 Bodine farm in 2019. The building retained its intact hand-hewn post and beam structure with pegged mortise and tenon joints and rubble nogging.

The township committee voted unanimously on May 12, 2025 to use eminent domain to seize a 175-year-old family farm in order to allow the construction of affordable housing. The Mount Laurel doctrine established by the Supreme Court of New Jersey in 1975 requires municipalities in New Jersey to change their zoning laws to enable the construction of low and middle income housing. The family is fighting the decision and the legal battle is ongoing. The town has been working with the state of New Jersey to alleviate the affordable housing restrictions that led to this property being necessary for affordable housing, and on October 23, 2025, Governor Murphy announced that an agreement was reached. On 6 November, the township revealed it had lost $26 million to a sophisticated fraud scheme, after sending a wire transfer while attempting to purchase property in order to meet their affordable housing obligations. Investigators from the Cranbury Township Police and Middlesex County Prosecutor's office have frozen roughly $17.3 million of the funds, while the investigation remains ongoing.

== Geography ==
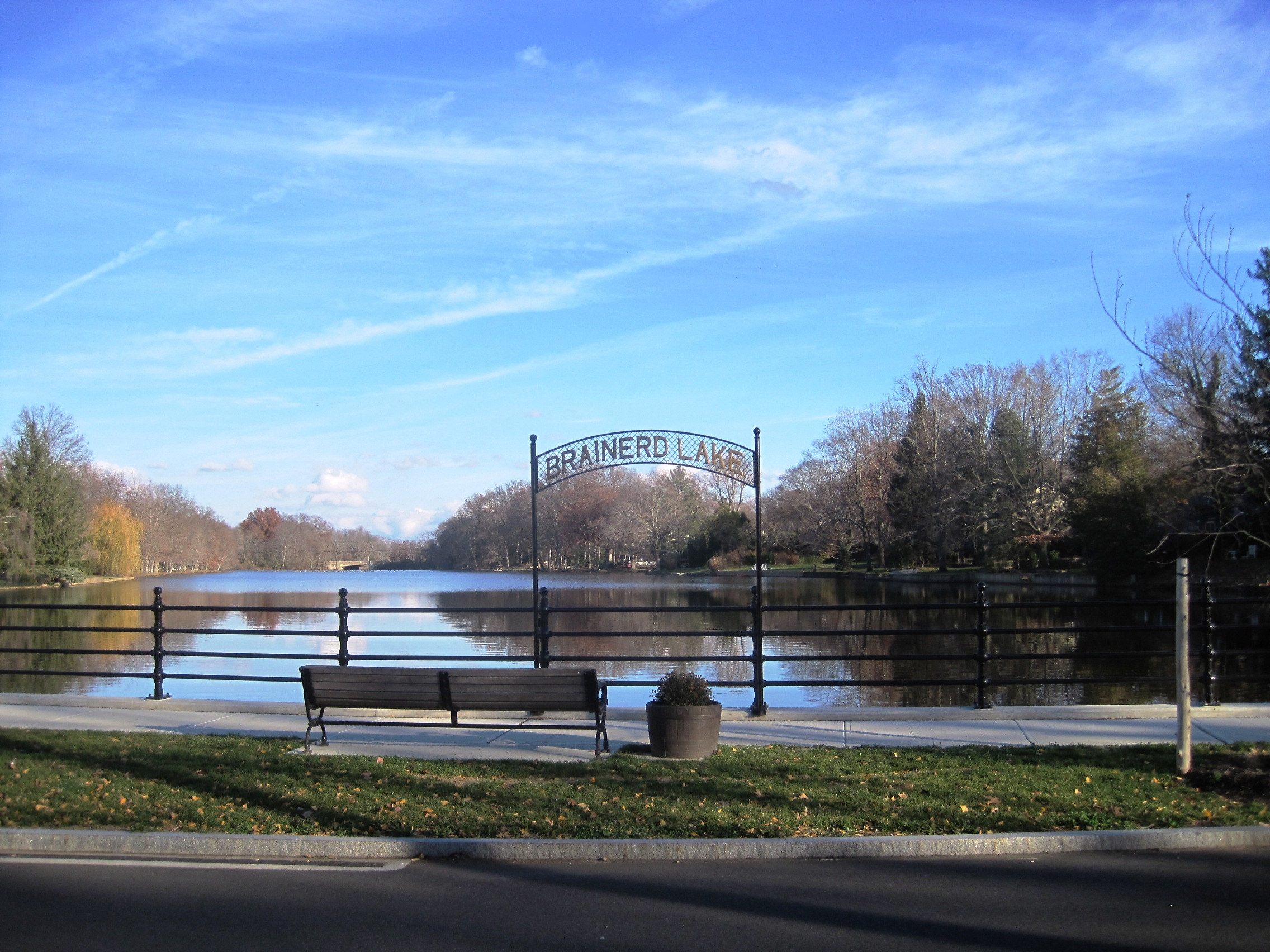
Brainerd Lake in the center of the township

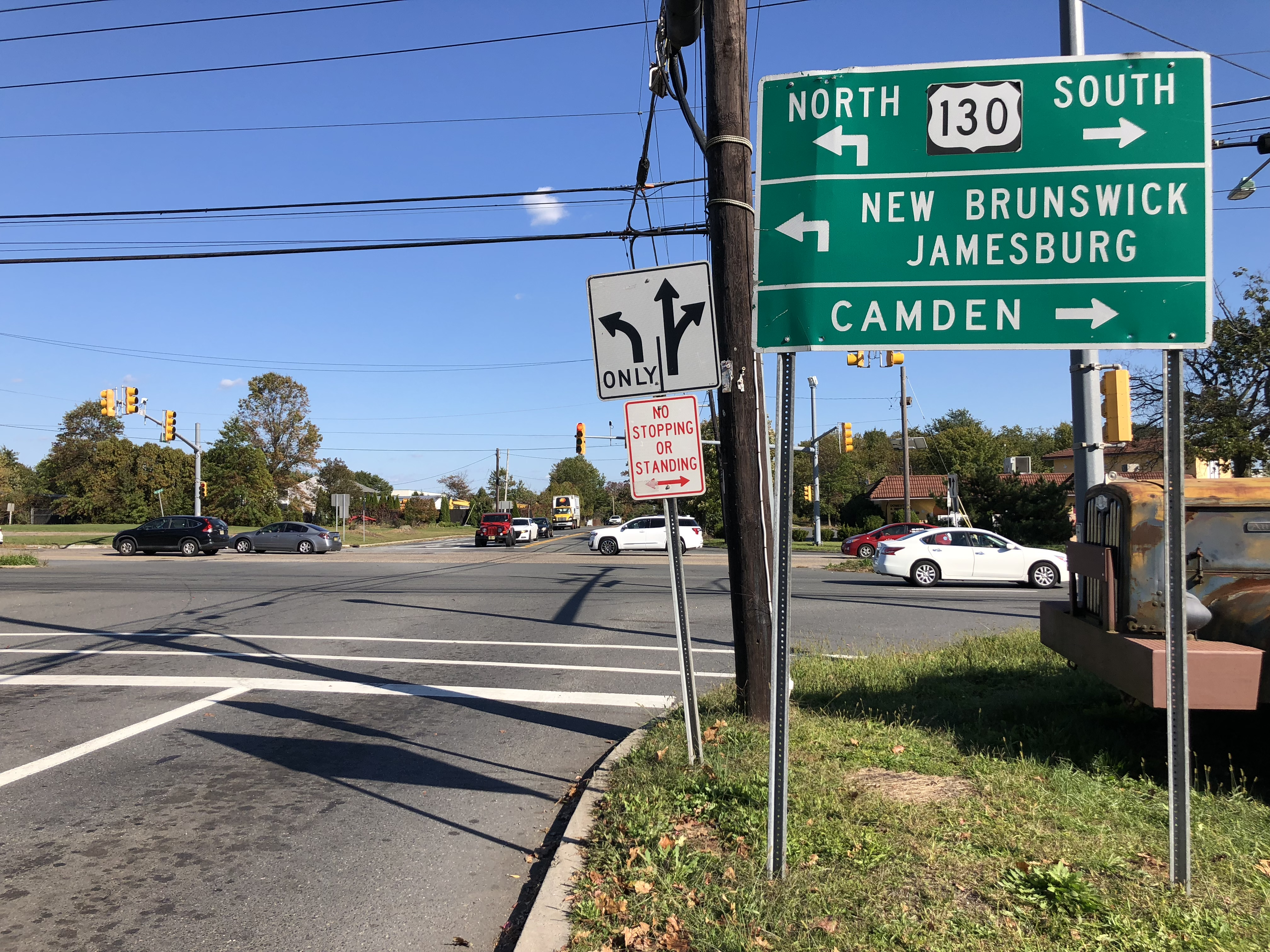
U.S. Route 130 is a major commercial and light-industrial highway in Cranbury.

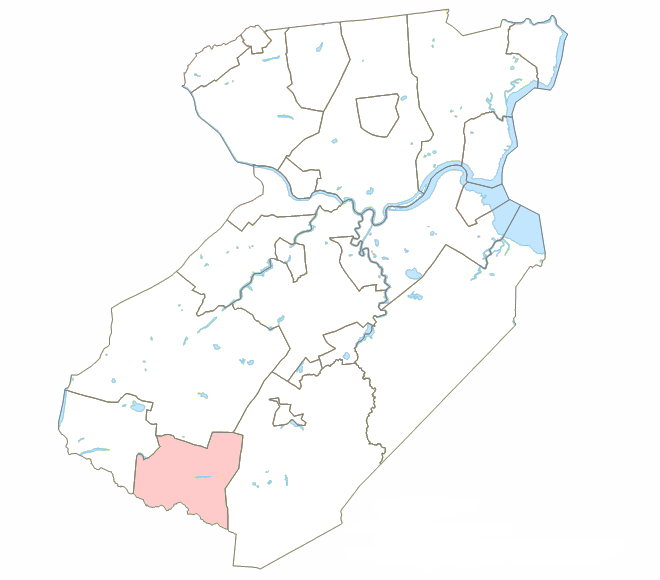
Cranbury Township highlighted in Middlesex County

According to the United States Census Bureau, the township had a total area of 13.43 square miles (34.79 km^{2}), including 13.28 square miles (34.40 km^{2}) of land and 0.15 square miles (0.39 km^{2}) of water (1.12%).

Cranbury CDP (2020 Census population of 2,200) is an unincorporated community and census-designated place (CDP) located within Cranbury Township. Despite the match between the name of the Township and the CDP, the two are not one and the same, as was the case for most paired Township / CDP combinations (i.e., a CDP with the same as its parent township) before the 2010 Census, when most such paired CDPs were coextensive with a township of the same name.

Other unincorporated communities, localities and place names located partially or completely within the township include Brain Grove Lake, Cranbury Station, Wescott, and Wyckoffs Mills.

The township borders Monroe Township, Plainsboro Township and South Brunswick Township in Middlesex County; and East Windsor Township in Mercer County.

== Demographics ==
Historical population
Census	Pop.	Note	%±
1880	1,509		—
1890	1,422		−5.8%
1900	1,428		0.4%
1910	1,424		−0.3%
1920	1,083	*	−23.9%
1930	1,278		18.0%
1940	1,342		5.0%
1950	1,797		33.9%
1960	2,001		11.4%
1970	2,253		12.6%
1980	1,927		−14.5%
1990	2,500		29.7%
2000	3,227		29.1%
2010	3,857		19.5%
2020	3,842		−0.4%
2023 (est.)	3,960	▲	3.1%
Population sources: 1880–1920 1880–1890; 1890–1910 1910–1930; 1940–2000 2000; 2010 2020 * = Lost territory in previous decade.

=== 2010 census ===
The 2010 United States census counted 3,857 people, 1,320 households, and 1,060 families in the township. The population density was 291.2 per square mile (112.4/km^{2}). There were 1,371 housing units at an average density of 103.5 per square mile (40.0/km^{2}). The racial makeup was 80.53% (3,106) White, 3.45% (133) Black or African American, 0.10% (4) Native American, 13.74% (530) Asian, 0.03% (1) Pacific Islander, 0.36% (14) from other races, and 1.79% (69) from two or more races. Hispanic or Latino people of any race were 2.57% (99) of the population.

Of the 1,320 households, 41.4% had children under the age of 18; 71.3% were married couples living together; 7.0% had a female householder with no husband present and 19.7% were non-families. Of all households, 17.5% were made up of individuals and 7.8% had someone living alone who was 65 years of age or older. The average household size was 2.82 and the average family size was 3.21.

27.2% of the population were under the age of 18, 5.4% from 18 to 24, 15.1% from 25 to 44, 35.5% from 45 to 64, and 16.6% who were 65 years of age or older. The median age was 46.2 years. For every 100 females, the population had 94.2 males. For every 100 females ages 18 and older there were 88.2 males.

The Census Bureau's 2006–2010 American Community Survey showed that (in 2010 inflation-adjusted dollars) median household income was $131,667 (with a margin of error of +/− $21,076) and the median family income was $146,250 (+/− $24,045). Males had a median income of $122,566 (+/− $25,917) versus $60,781 (+/− $22,066) for females. The per capita income for the borough was $55,236 (+/− $5,718). About 3.1% of families and 4.1% of the population were below the poverty line, including 8.2% of those under age 18 and none of those age 65 or over.

=== 2000 census ===
As of the 2000 United States census there were 3,227 people, 1,091 households, and 877 families residing in the township. The population density was 240.6 inhabitants per square mile (92.9/km^{2}). There were 1,121 housing units at an average density of 83.6 per square mile (32.3/km^{2}). The racial makeup of the township was 88.78% White, 2.26% African American, 7.41% Asian, 0.22% from other races, and 1.33% from two or more races. Hispanic or Latino people of any race were 1.70% of the population.

There were 1,091 households, out of which 46.3% had children under the age of 18 living with them, 74.6% were married couples living together, 4.3% had a female householder with no husband present, and 19.6% were non-families. 16.3% of all households were made up of individuals, and 7.9% had someone living alone who was 65 years of age or older. The average household size was 2.92 and the average family size was 3.31.

In the township the population was spread out, with 30.4% under the age of 18, 3.4% from 18 to 24, 27.6% from 25 to 44, 27.3% from 45 to 64, and 11.2% who were 65 years of age or older. The median age was 40 years. For every 100 females, there were 93.3 males. For every 100 females age 18 and over, there were 90.4 males.

The median income for a household in the township was $111,680, and the median income for a family was $128,410. Males had a median income of $94,683 versus $44,167 for females. The per capita income for the township was $50,698. About 0.7% of families and 1.6% of the population were below the poverty line, including 2.7% of those under age 18 and 0.9% of those age 65 or over.

== Economy ==
Cranbury is host to many warehouses along Route 130 and the roads leading to the NJ Turnpike. A company making the Boy Scout Pinewood Derby cars is also here. Cranbury was noted for a used Rolls-Royce dealership located in the center of township, but it has gone out of business. The alternative energy business Brilliant Light Power, which occupies a building formerly occupied by Creative Playthings, is in fact located in East Windsor, in an area served by the Cranbury Post Office.

The Associated University Presses is an academic publishing company supplying textbooks to colleges and universities.

== Government ==
=== Local government ===
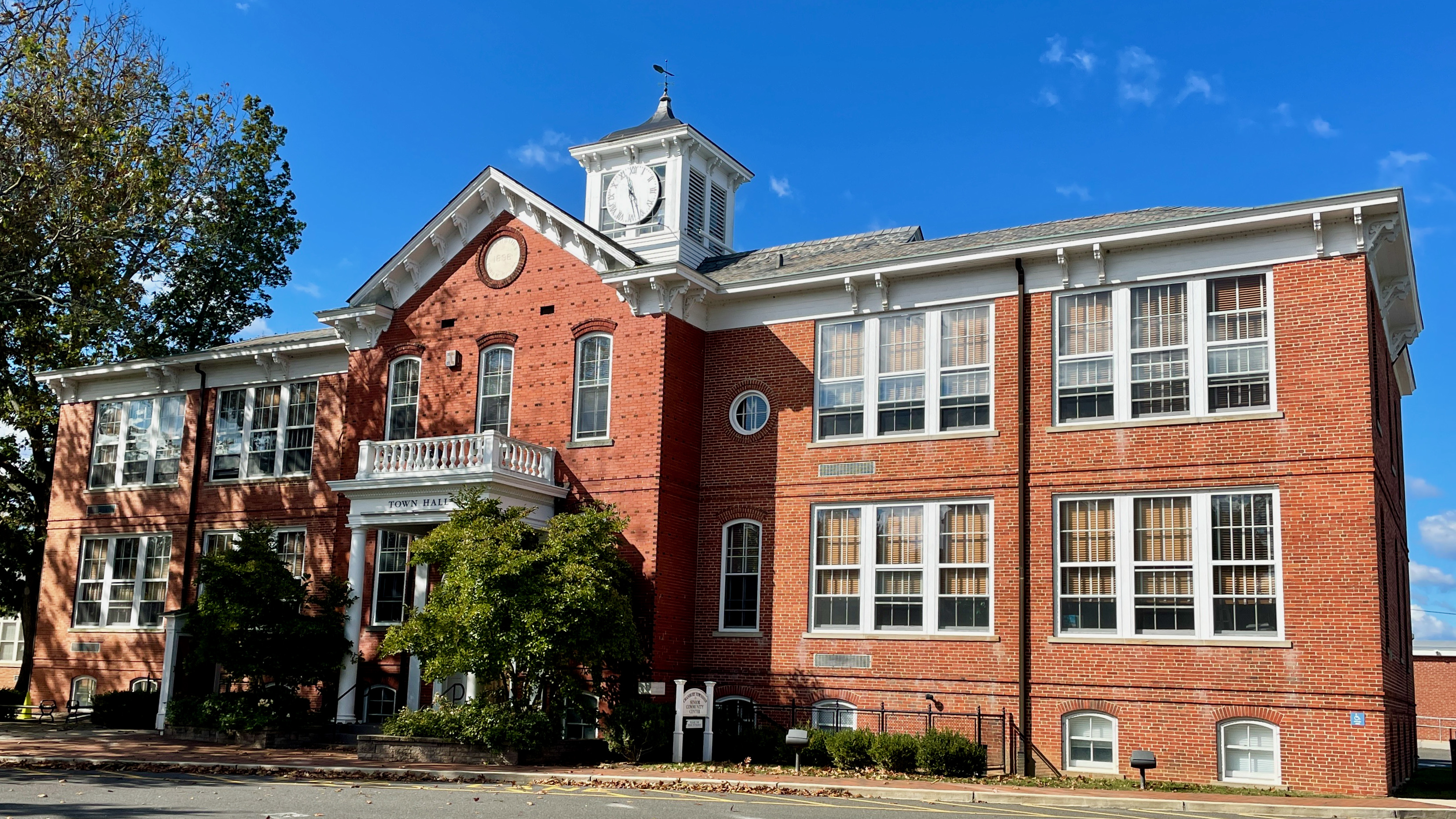
Cranbury Town Hall, the Old Cranbury School

Cranbury Township is governed under the township form of government, one of 141 municipalities (of the 564) statewide governed under this form. The Township Committee is comprised of five members, who are elected directly by the voters at-large in partisan elections to serve three-year terms of office on a staggered basis, with either one or two seats coming up for election each year as part of the November general election in a three-year cycle; all terms of office end on December 31. At an annual reorganization meeting, the Township Committee selects one of its members to serve as mayor. In 1990, the Cranbury Township Committee was expanded from three to five members and the position of Township Administrator was established by ordinance.

As of 2026, members of the Cranbury Township Committee are Mayor Lisa Knierim (D, term on committee ends December 31, 2028; term as mayor ends 2026), Deputy Mayor Barbara F. Rogers (D, term on committee ends 2028; term as deputy mayor ends 2026), Robert Christopher (D, 2027), Eman El-Badawi (D, 2027) and Matthew A. Scott (D, 2026).

In 2023, the township had the lowest effective property tax rate in Middlesex County at 1.621%. In 2018, the township had an average property tax bill of $11,960, the highest in the county, compared to an average bill of $8,767 statewide.

=== Federal, state and county representation ===
Cranbury Township is located in the 12th Congressional District and is part of New Jersey's 14th state legislative district.

For the 119th United States Congress, New Jersey's 12th congressional district is represented by Bonnie Watson Coleman (D, Ewing Township). New Jersey is represented in the United States Senate by Democrats Cory Booker (Newark, term ends 2027) and Andy Kim (Moorestown, term ends 2031).

For the 2026–2027 session, the 14th legislative district of the New Jersey Legislature is represented in the State Senate by Linda R. Greenstein (D, Plainsboro Township) and in the General Assembly by Wayne DeAngelo (D, Hamilton Township) and Tennille McCoy (D, Hamilton Township).

Middlesex County is governed by a Board of County Commissioners, whose seven members are elected at-large on a partisan basis to serve three-year terms of office on a staggered basis, with either two or three seats coming up for election each year as part of the November general election. At an annual reorganization meeting held in January, the board selects from among its members a commissioner director and deputy director. As of 2025, Middlesex County's Commissioners (with party affiliation, term-end year, and residence listed in parentheses) are:

Director Ronald G. Rios (D, Carteret, 2027), Deputy Director Shanti Narra (D, North Brunswick, 2027), Claribel A. "Clary" Azcona-Barber (D, New Brunswick, 2025), Charles Kenny (D, Woodbridge Township, 2025), Leslie Koppel (D, Monroe Township, 2026), Chanelle Scott McCullum (D, Piscataway, 2025) and Charles E. Tomaro (D, Edison, 2026).

Constitutional officers are: Clerk Nancy Pinkin (D, 2025, East Brunswick), Sheriff Mildred S. Scott (D, 2025, Piscataway) and Surrogate Claribel Cortes (D, 2026; North Brunswick).

=== Politics ===
As of March 2011, there were a total of 2,768 registered voters in Cranbury Township, of which 836 (30.2%) were registered as Democrats, 684 (24.7%) were registered as Republicans and 1,246 (45.0%) were registered as Unaffiliated. There were 2 voters registered as either Libertarians or Greens.

United States presidential election results for Cranbury
Year	Republican		Democratic		Third party(ies)	
Year	No.	%	No.	%	No.	%
2024	892	36.41%	1,497	61.10%	61	2.49%
2020	872	34.56%	1,596	63.26%	55	2.18%
2016	794	37.10%	1,196	55.89%	150	7.01%
2012	971	46.93%	1,076	52.01%	22	1.06%
2008	986	45.48%	1,153	53.18%	29	1.34%
2004	1,044	50.83%	987	48.05%	23	1.12%
2000	848	51.49%	740	44.93%	59	3.58%

In the 2012 presidential election, Democrat Barack Obama received 52.0% of the vote (1,076 cast), ahead of Republican Mitt Romney with 46.9% (971 votes), and other candidates with 1.1% (22 votes), among the 2,082 ballots cast by the township's 2,839 registered voters (13 ballots were spoiled), for a turnout of 73.3%. In the 2008 presidential election, Democrat Barack Obama received 53.0% of the vote (1,153 cast), ahead of Republican John McCain with 45.3% (986 votes) and other candidates with 1.3% (29 votes), among the 2,176 ballots cast by the township's 2,777 registered voters, for a turnout of 78.4%. In the 2004 presidential election, Republican George W. Bush received 50.8% of the vote (1,044 ballots cast), outpolling Democrat John Kerry with 48.0% (987 votes) and other candidates with 0.9% (23 votes), among the 2,055 ballots cast by the township's 2,510 registered voters, for a turnout percentage of 81.9.

Gubernatorial election results for Cranbury
Year	Republican		Democratic		Third party(ies)	
Year	No.	%	No.	%	No.	%
2025	812	38.12%	1,309	61.46%	9	0.42%
2021	727	41.69%	999	57.28%	18	1.03%
2017	655	47.19%	716	51.59%	17	1.22%
2013	941	67.12%	439	31.31%	22	1.57%
2009	901	54.91%	585	35.65%	155	9.45%
2005	787	51.54%	691	45.25%	49	3.21%

In the 2013 gubernatorial election, Republican Chris Christie received 67.1% of the vote (941 cast), ahead of Democrat Barbara Buono with 31.3% (439 votes), and other candidates with 1.6% (22 votes), among the 1,421 ballots cast by the township's 2,850 registered voters (19 ballots were spoiled), for a turnout of 49.9%. In the 2009 gubernatorial election, Republican Chris Christie received 54.6% of the vote (901 ballots cast), ahead of Democrat Jon Corzine with 35.5% (585 votes), Independent Chris Daggett with 8.7% (144 votes) and other candidates with 0.7% (11 votes), among the 1,649 ballots cast by the township's 2,711 registered voters, yielding a 60.8% turnout.

United States Senate election results for Cranbury1
Year	Republican		Democratic		Third party(ies)	
Year	No.	%	No.	%	No.	%
2024	897	37.24%	1,469	60.98%	43	1.78%
2018	904	46.34%	987	50.59%	60	3.08%
2012	948	47.93%	1,002	50.66%	28	1.42%
2006	770	49.11%	760	48.47%	38	2.42%

United States Senate election results for Cranbury2
Year	Republican		Democratic		Third party(ies)	
Year	No.	%	No.	%	No.	%
2020	951	38.10%	1,502	60.18%	43	1.72%
2014	571	47.31%	616	51.04%	20	1.66%
2013	481	49.28%	487	49.90%	8	0.82%
2008	1,091	52.76%	945	45.70%	32	1.55%

== Education ==
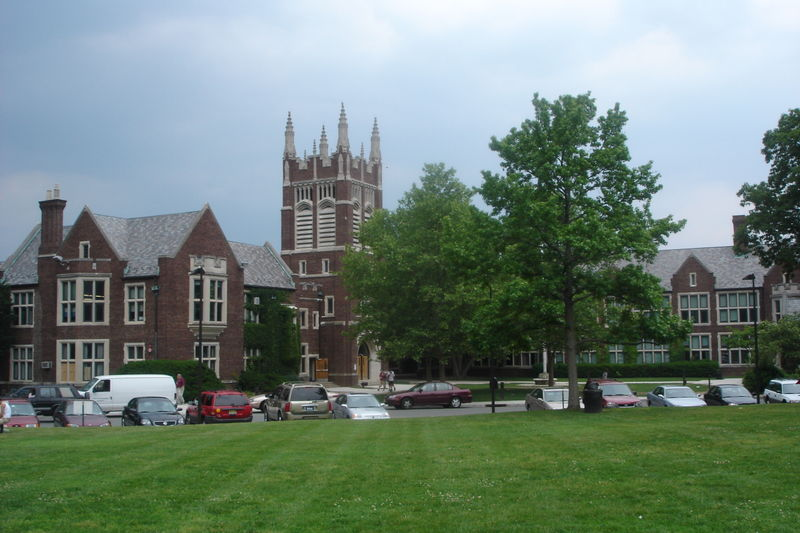
Princeton High School

The Cranbury School District serves children in public school for pre-kindergarten through eighth grade at Cranbury School. As of the 2022–23 school year, the district, comprised of one school, had an enrollment of 453 students and 59.1 classroom teachers (on an FTE basis), for a student–teacher ratio of 7.7:1. For the 2016–17 school year, Cranbury School was formally designated as a National Blue Ribbon School, the highest honor that an American public school can achieve. This was also earned during the 1996–97 and 2009-10 school years.

Since 1991, ninth through twelfth grade students have gone to Princeton High School in Princeton, as part of a sending/receiving relationship with the Princeton Public Schools. Cranbury Township is granted a seat on the Princeton Regional Schools Board of Education, with the designated representative only voting on issues pertaining to Princeton High School and district-wide issues. As of the 2022–23 school year, the high school had an enrollment of 1,532 students and 130.2 classroom teachers (on an FTE basis), for a student–teacher ratio of 11.8:1. Cranbury students had attended Hightstown High School and then Lawrence High School before the relationship was established with Princeton.

Eighth grade students from all of Middlesex County are eligible to apply to attend the high school programs offered by the Middlesex County Magnet Schools, a county-wide vocational school district that offers full-time career and technical education at its schools in East Brunswick, Edison, Perth Amboy, Piscataway and Woodbridge Township, with no tuition charged to students for attendance.

=== Public libraries ===
The Cranbury Public Library serves Cranbury residents and opened in a brand-new building in November 2022 at 30 Park Place West. Prior to the free-standing building, the library shared a facility with the Cranbury School from 1968 until summer 2020 when the school evicted the library to provide additional learning space during the COVID-19 pandemic. From early 2021 to November 2022, the library operated out of a pocket library on North Main Street. The free-standing library was built with funds donated through a capital campaign by the Cranbury Public Library Foundation from 2010 through 2022, as well as funds from surplus operating revenue saved from prior to 2008 when the Cranbury School started charging rent. In 2020, the library applied for and was awarded a $2.39 million grant from the New Jersey Library Construction Bond Act.

== Historic district ==
- Cranbury Historic District
- U.S. National Register of Historic Places
- U.S. Historic district
- New Jersey Register of Historic Places
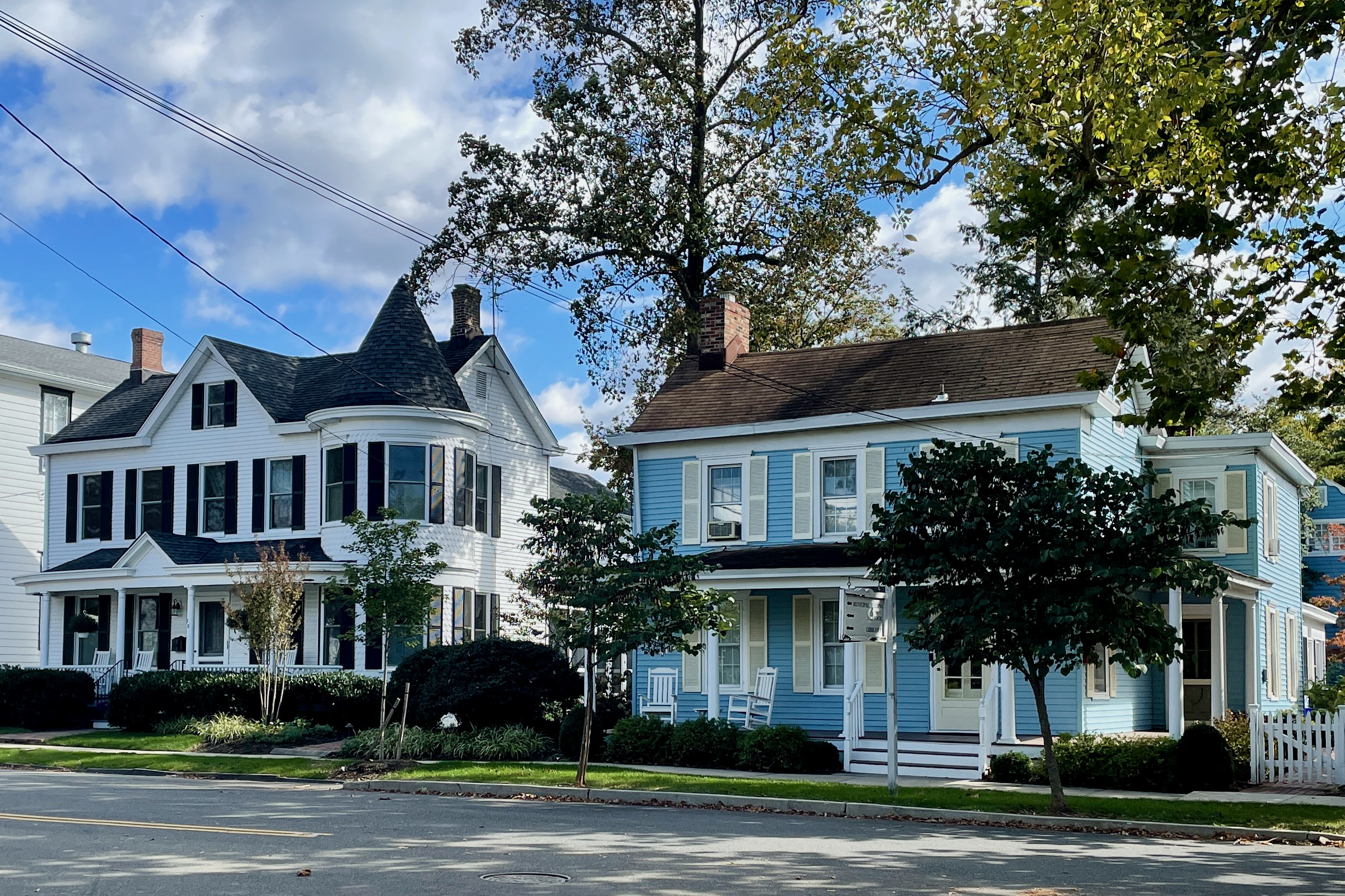
- Historic houses on North Main Street
- Location: Main and Prospect streets; Maplewood and Scott avenues; Bunker Hill Road; Symmes Court; Westminster, Park and Wesley places
- Area: 175 acres (71 ha)
- Architectural style: Bungalow/craftsman, Greek Revival, Vernacular Italianate
- NRHP reference No.: 80002502
- NJRHP No.: 1830

Significant dates
- Added to NRHP: September 18, 1980
- Designated NJRHP: August 9, 1979

The Cranbury Historic District is a 175-acre (71 ha) historic district encompassing the village of Cranbury along Main and Prospect streets; Maplewood and Scott avenues; Bunker Hill Road; Symmes Court; Westminster, Park and Wesley places. It was added to the National Register of Historic Places on September 18, 1980, for its significance in architecture and commerce. The district includes 177 contributing buildings, including the Old Cranbury School, which was added individually to the NRHP in 1971. Many buildings on Cranbury's Main Street and in the surrounding area date to the 18th or 19th century.

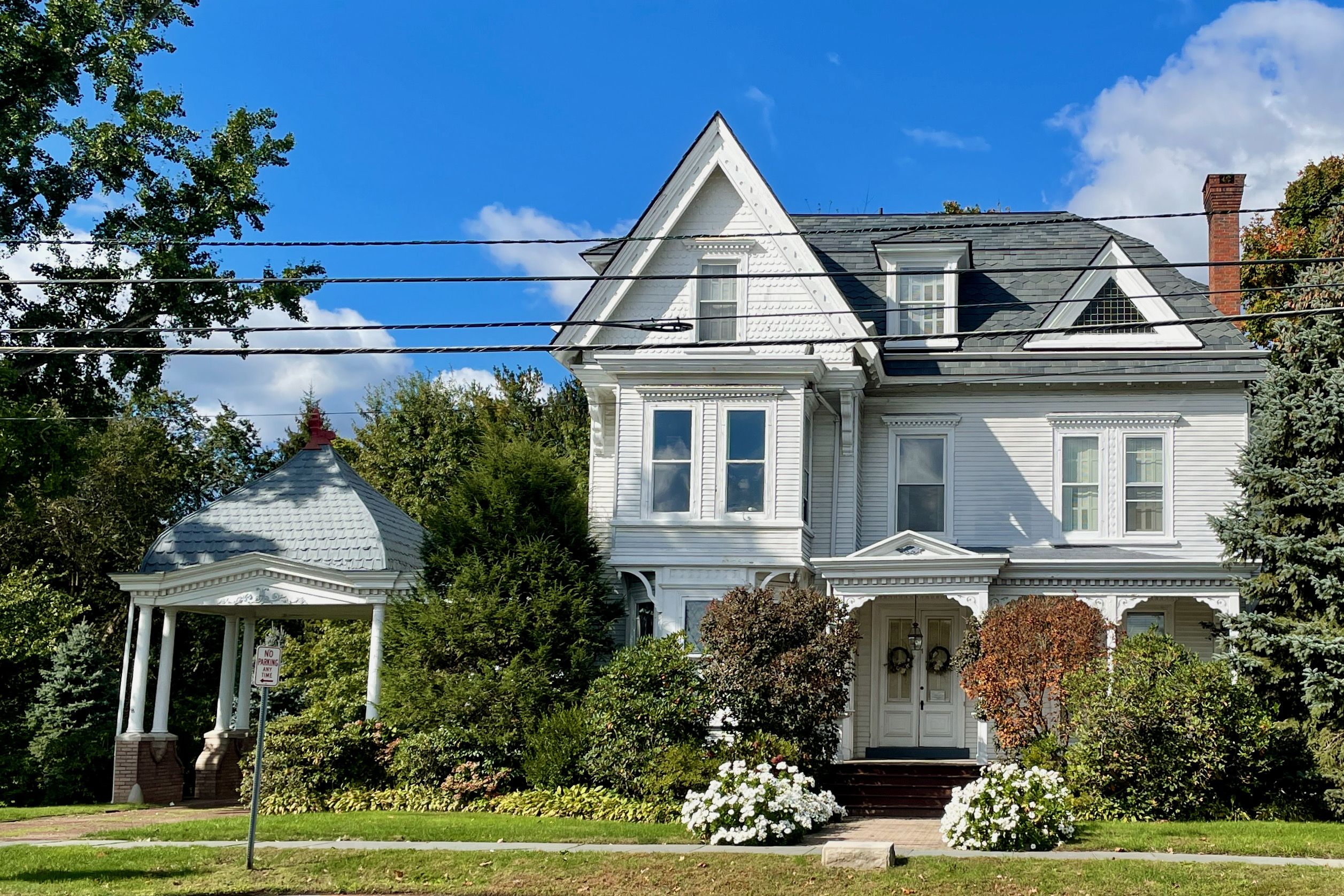
The John S. Silvers Mansion, built in 1886

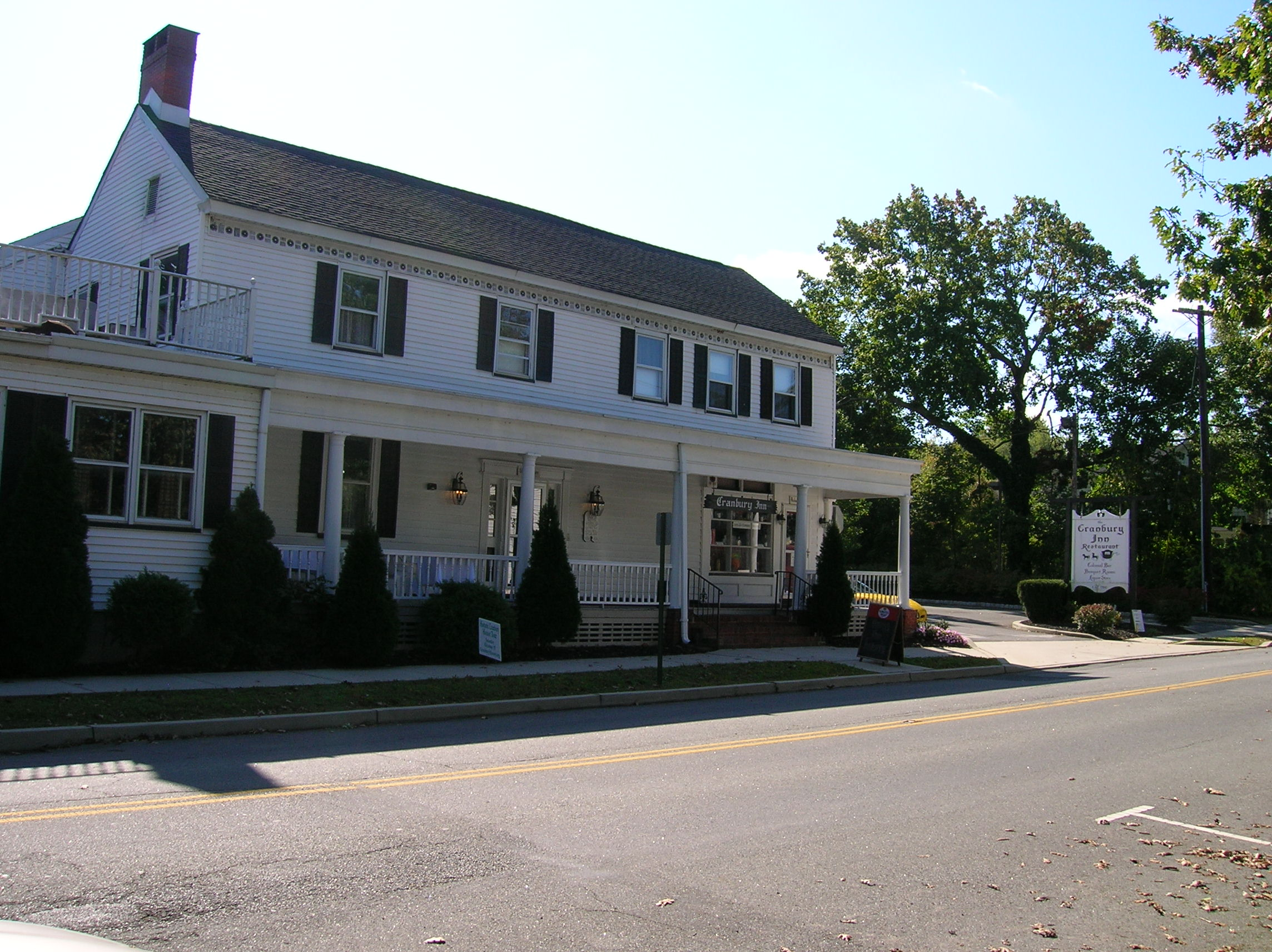
The Cranbury Inn

=== Cranberry Mills ===
The nomination form describes how "Cranbury is the best preserved 19th century village in Middlesex County" and states that "While there are many small mill towns in New Jersey, few are in such an undisturbed environment as that of Cranbury." The John S. Silvers Mansion, built 1886, features Queen Anne style architecture. The Elizabeth M. Wagner History Center of the Cranbury Historical and Preservation Society is located in a former gristmiller's house and has a display on Cranberry Mills. Cranberry Mills is an exemplary historic showcase of Cranbury's importance as a bustling mill town during the 18th/19th centuries. It was located along Cranbury Brook, a tributary of the Millstone River (which in turn is a major tributary of the Raritan River).

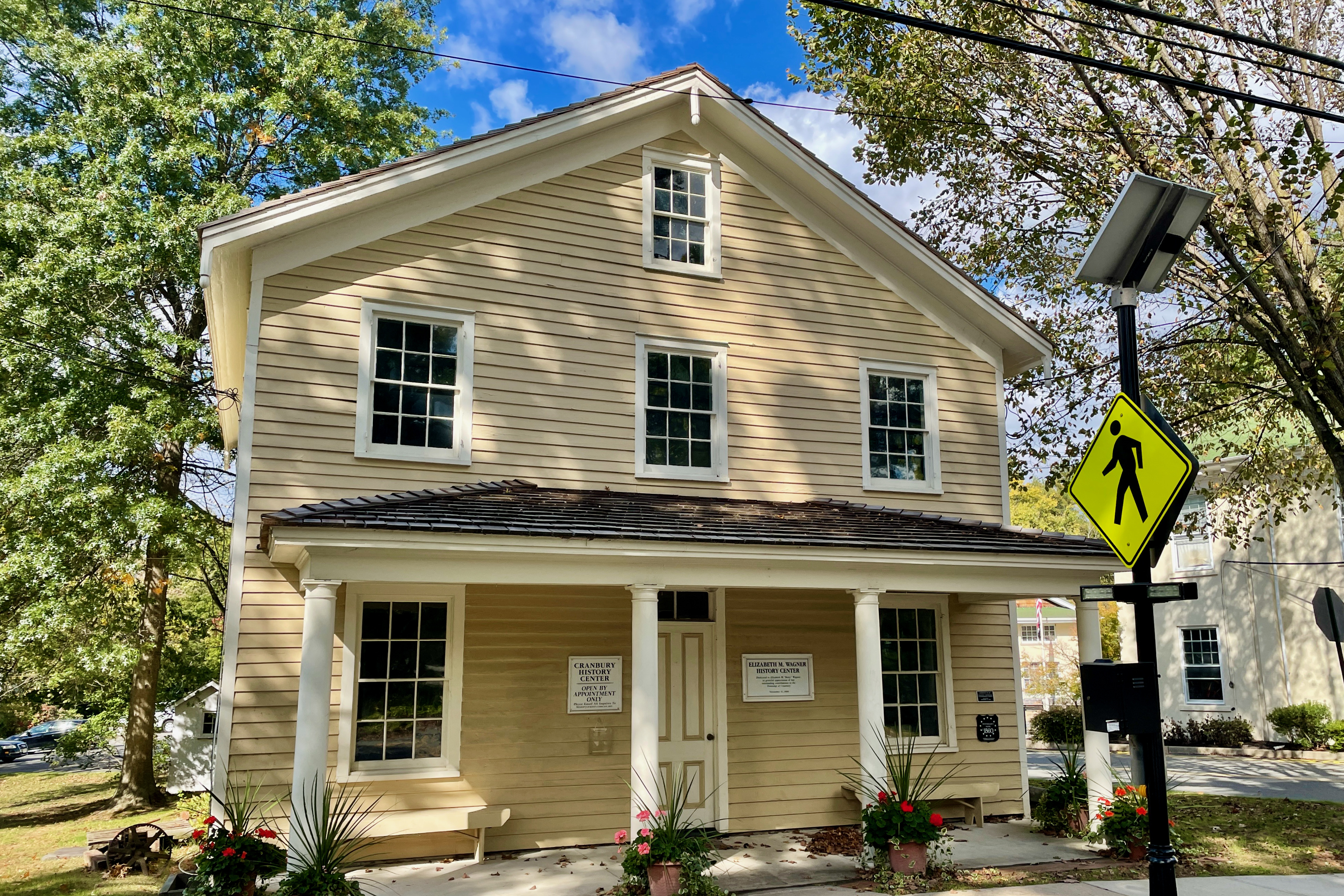
Elizabeth M. Wagner History Center

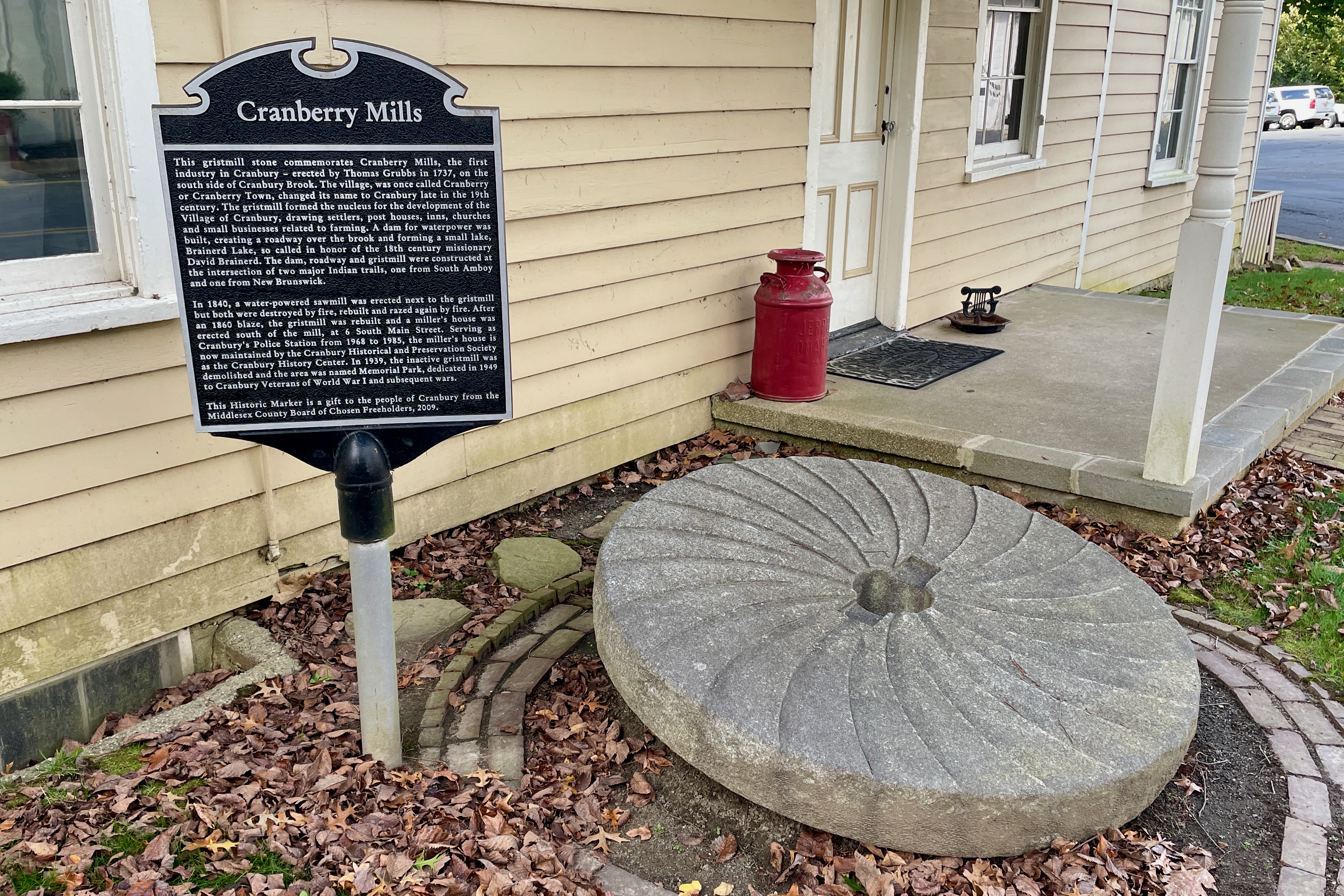
Information on Cranberry Mills

=== Places of worship ===
The First Presbyterian Church was founded c. 1740 and the current church was built in 1839. The United Methodist Church was built in 1848. Both are contributing properties of the historic district.

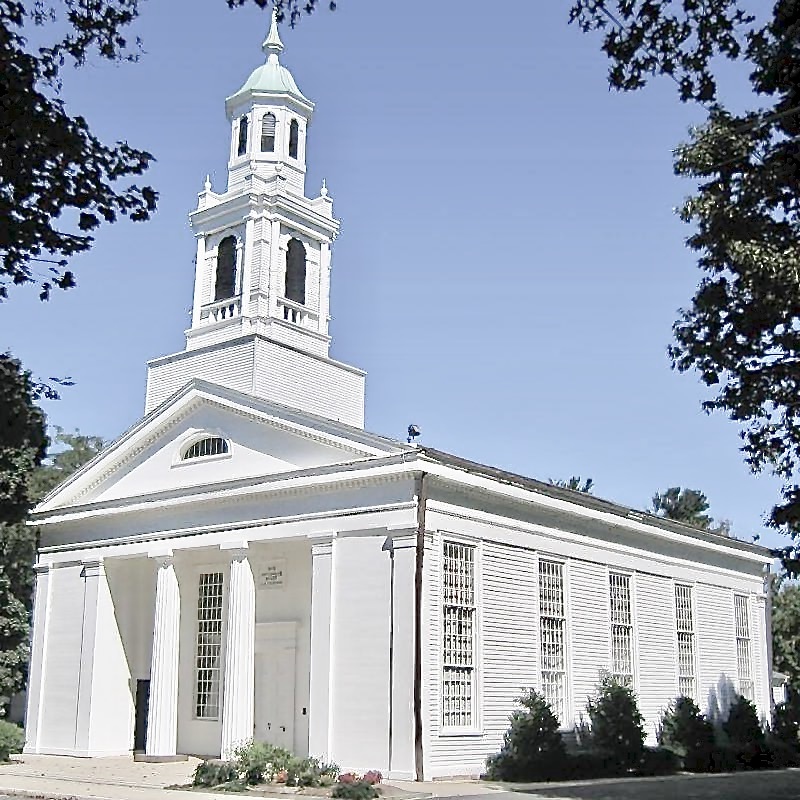
First Presbyterian Church

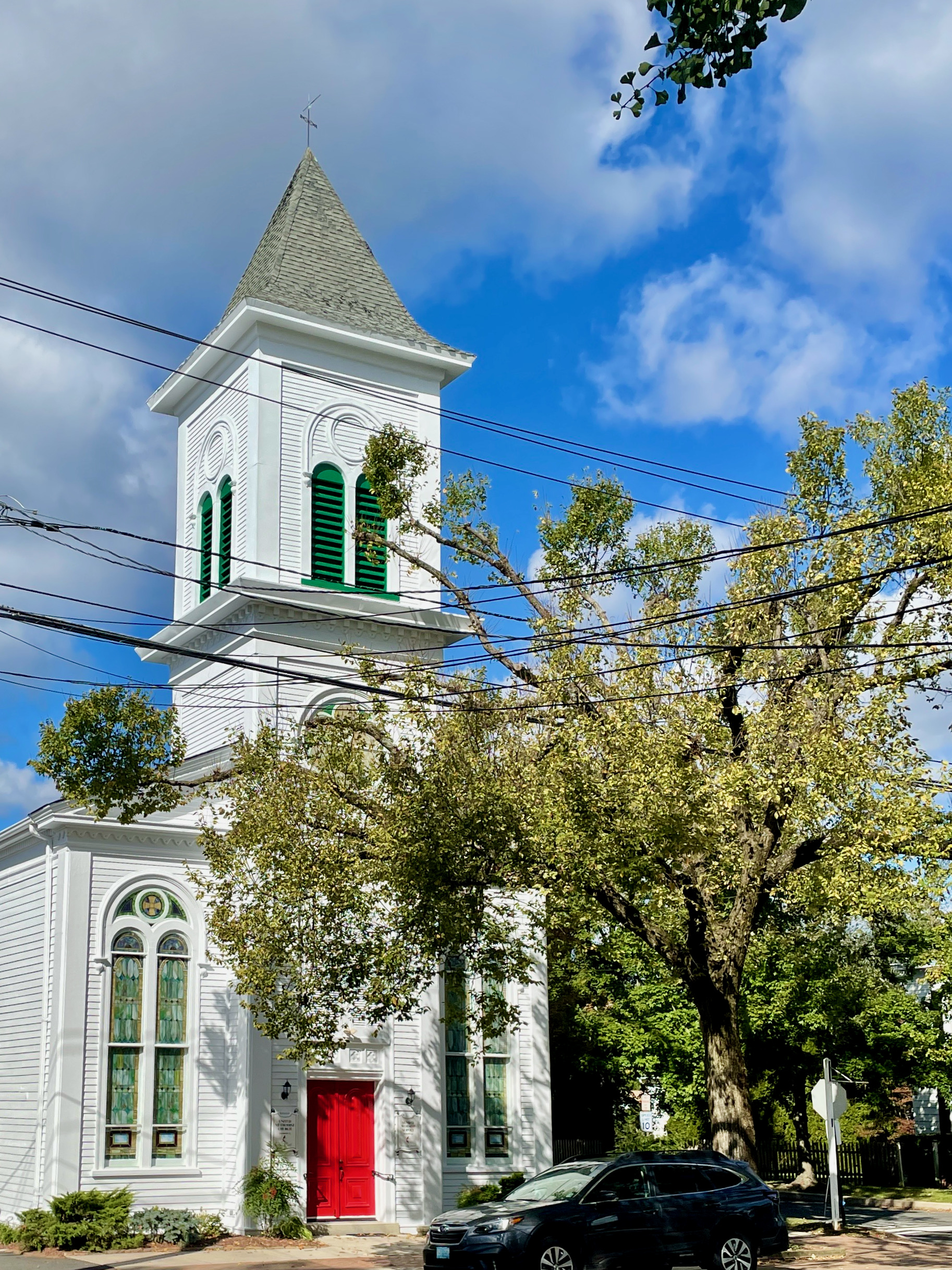
United Methodist Church

== Infrastructure ==
=== Transportation ===
==== Roads and highways ====
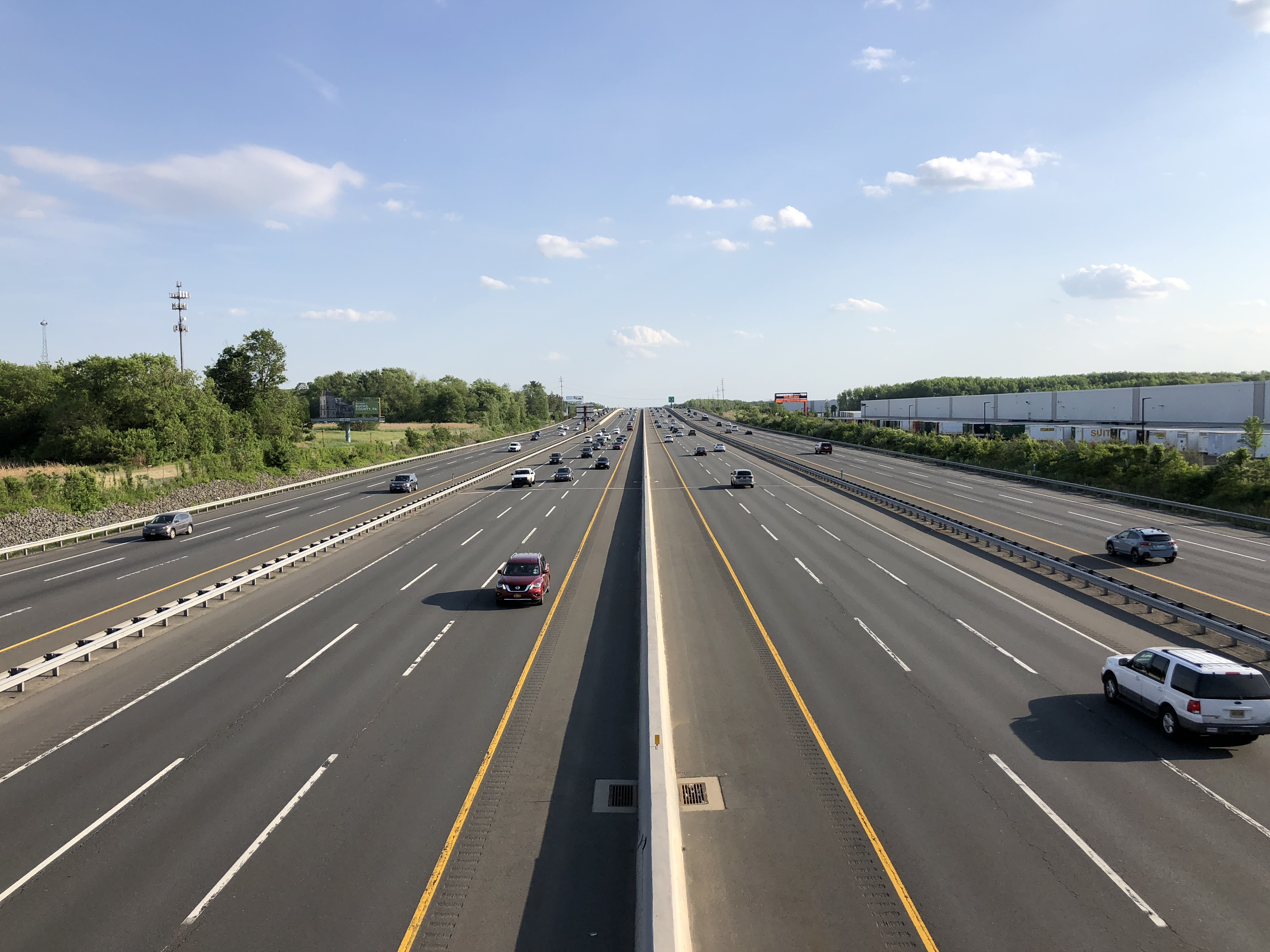
View south along the 12-lane New Jersey Turnpike (Interstate 95) near exit 8A in Cranbury

As of May 2010, the township had a total of 51.25 miles (82.48 km) of roadways, of which 31.08 miles (50.02 km) were maintained by the municipality, 12.85 miles (20.68 km) by Middlesex County and 3.16 miles (5.09 km) by the New Jersey Department of Transportation and 4.16 miles (6.69 km) by the New Jersey Turnpike Authority.

Several major roads and highways pass through the township Cranbury hosts a 4-mile (6.4 km) section of Interstate 95 (the New Jersey Turnpike). While there are no exits in Cranbury, the township is accessible by the Turnpike in neighboring East Windsor Township (Exit 8) and Monroe Township (Exit 8A). The Molly Pitcher Service Area is located at mile marker 71.7 on the southbound side.

Other significant roads passing through Cranbury include U.S. Route 130, County Route 535, County Route 539, County Route 615 and County Route 614.

==== Public transportation ====
Middlesex County offers the M6 MCAT shuttle route providing service to Jamesburg and Plainsboro Township.

=== Healthcare ===
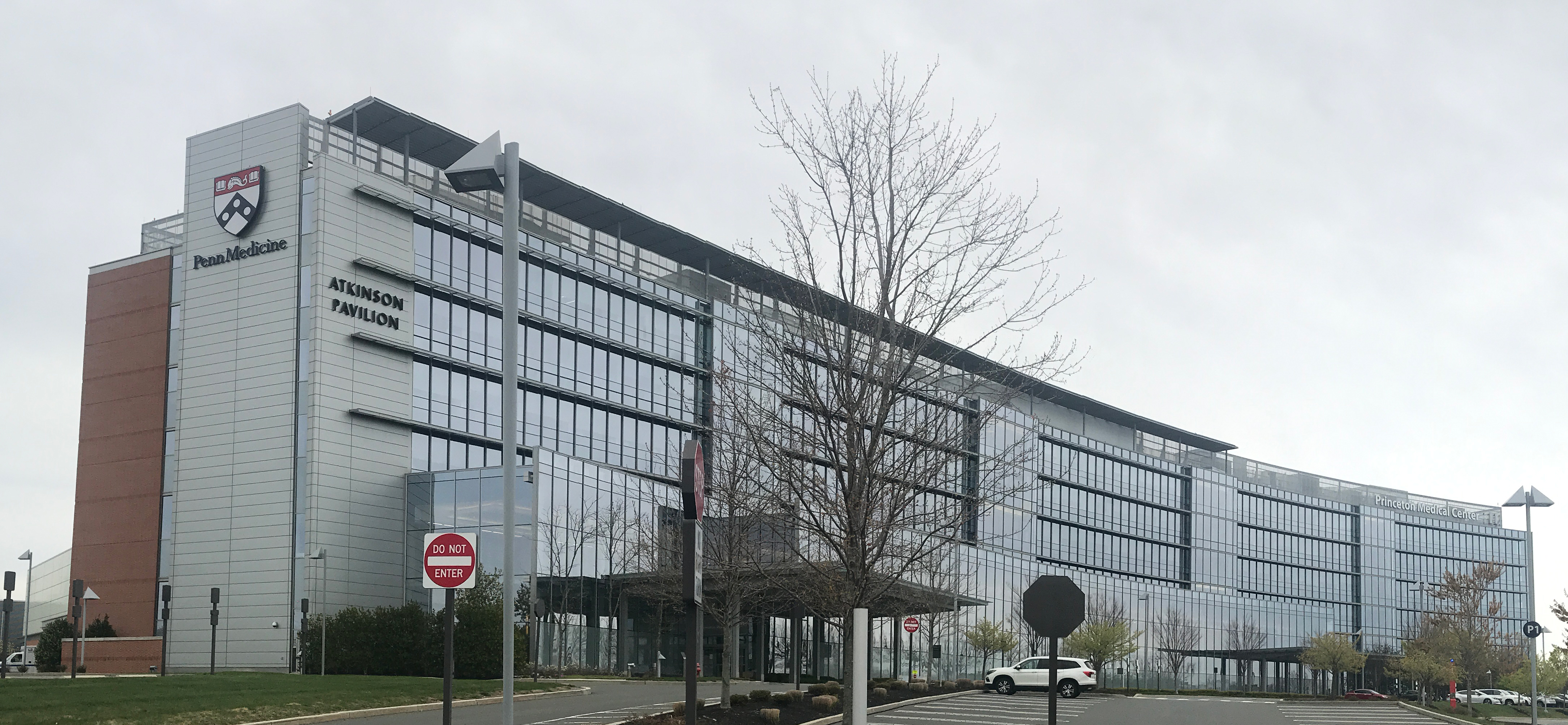
Penn Medicine Princeton Medical Center

Penn Medicine Princeton Medical Center is a 355-bed regional non-profit, tertiary and academic medical center located in neighboring Plainsboro Township. The hospital services the greater Princeton region in central New Jersey. It is owned by the Penn Medicine Health System and is the only such hospital in the state of New Jersey.

Other nearby regional hospitals and healthcare networks that are accessible to the township include CentraState Medical Center in Freehold Township, the Old Bridge Township division of Raritan Bay Medical Center, and Saint Peter's University Hospital and Robert Wood Johnson University Hospital in nearby New Brunswick.

== Notable people ==
People who were born in, residents of, or otherwise closely associated with Cranbury include:

- Melanie Balcomb (born 1962), head coach of the Vanderbilt Commodores women's basketball team
- Todd Beamer (1968–2001), passenger aboard United Airlines Flight 93, who said "Let's roll" to fellow passengers with whom he was planning an attack on terrorists who had taken over the cockpit
- Scott Brunner (born 1957), quarterback who played in the NFL from 1981 to 1986, most notably for the New York Giants
- Ronald C. Davidson (1941–2016), physicist, professor and scientific administrator who served as the first director of the MIT Plasma Science and Fusion Center and as director of the Princeton Plasma Physics Laboratory
- Wendy Gooditis (born Gwendolyn Wallace in 1960), politician who represents Virginia's 10th House of Delegates district in the Virginia House of Delegates
- Noah Harlan, independent filmmaker
- Ralph Izzo, businessman and former nuclear physicist who was the Chairman, Presiden, and CEO of Public Service Enterprise Group
- Hughie Lee-Smith (1915–1999), artist
- Cicero Hunt Lewis (1826–1897), merchant
- Robert Lougy, judge on the New Jersey Superior Court who served as acting New Jersey Attorney General in 1996
- Charles McKnight (1750–1791), physician during and after the American Revolutionary War
- Jan Morris (1926–2020), Welsh travel writer and historian, whose impressions of his time living in Cranbury in the 1950s are recorded in the book Coast to Coast: A Journey Across 1950s America
- Taylor Ortega (born 1988 or 1989), actress and comedian who has starred in the series Welcome to Flatch and Big Mistakes
- Henry Perrine (1797–1840), physician, horticulturist and enthusiast for introducing tropical plants into cultivation in the US
- Craig Sechler (born 1951), film and voice actor
- Hollis Sigler (1948–2001), artist
- Jessica Ware (born 1977), Canadian-American evolutionary biologist and entomologist
- Barbara Wright (born 1933), politician who represented the 14th Legislative District for four terms in the New Jersey General Assembly

== In popular culture ==
Cranbury is referenced in the 2014 movie Edge of Tomorrow, as the hometown of Major William Cage (played by Tom Cruise). When asked if people of Cranbury plant cranberries, Cage answers: "Tomatoes, best I've ever had."

== See also ==
- List of Washington's Headquarters during the Revolutionary War
- National Register of Historic Places listings in Middlesex County, New Jersey
