= Cranbury (CDP), New Jersey =

Populated place in Middlesex County, New Jersey, US

Cranbury, New Jersey
- Census-designated place
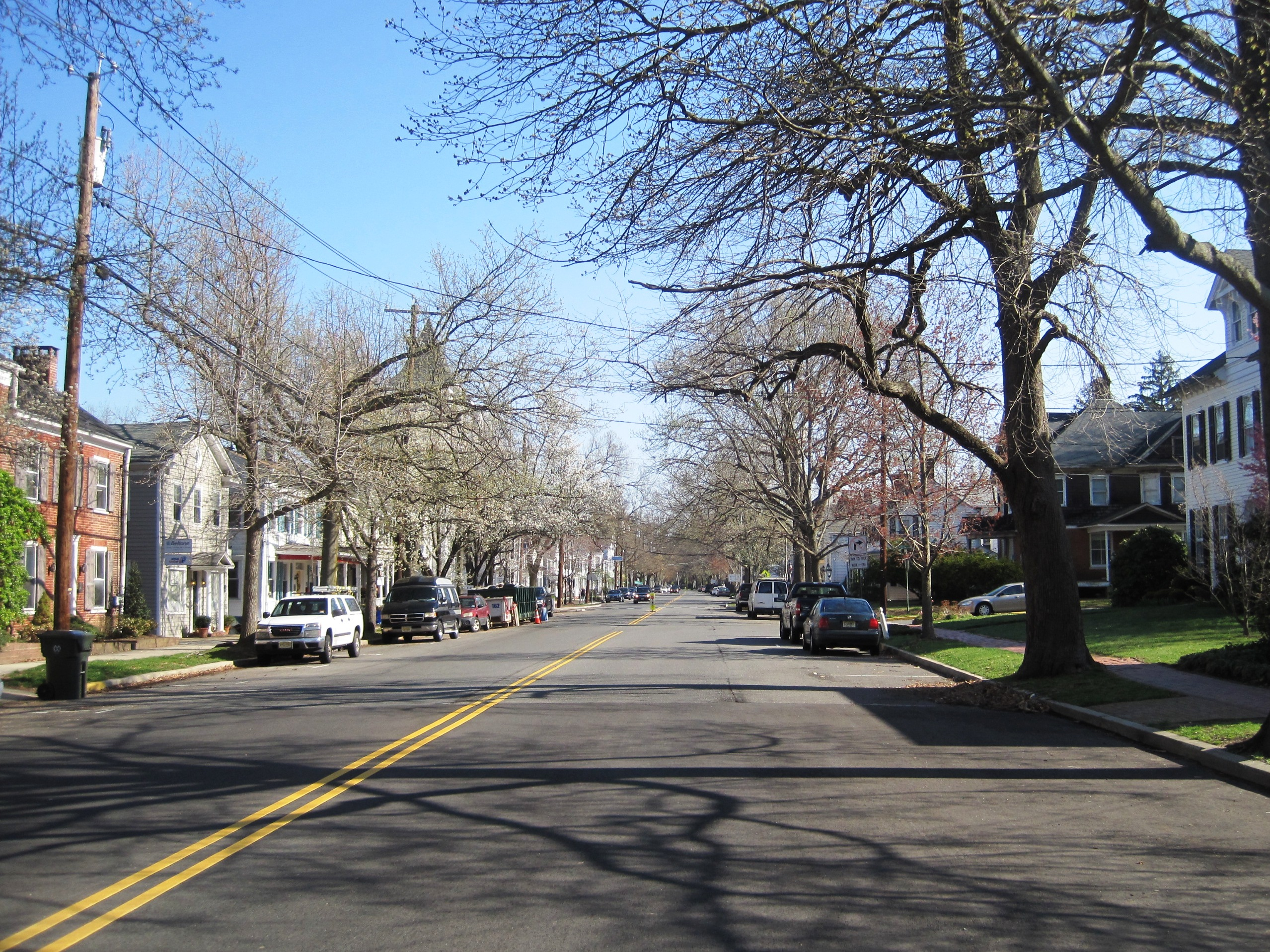
- Center of Cranbury

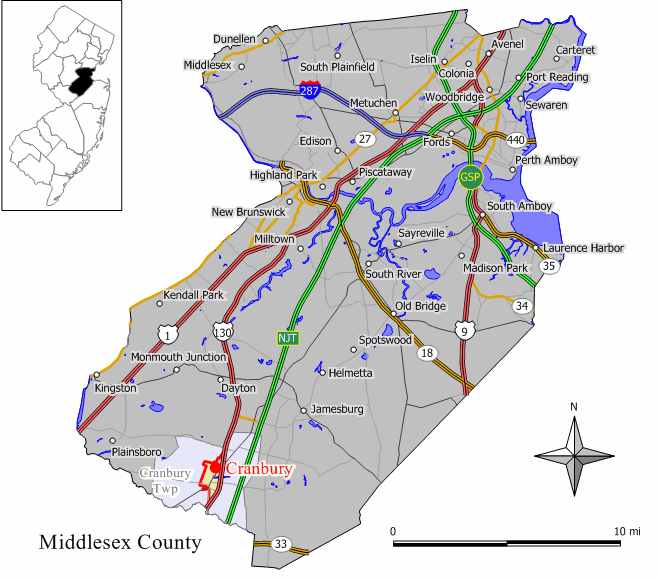
- Map of Cranbury CDP in Middlesex County. Inset: Location of Middlesex County in New Jersey.

- Location within Middlesex County, New Jersey Location within New Jersey Location within the United States
- Coordinates: 40.313448°N 74.520224°W
- Country: United States
- State: New Jersey
- County: Middlesex
- Township: Cranbury

Area
  - Total: 1.24 sq mi (3.22 km^{2})
  - Land: 1.22 sq mi (3.17 km^{2})
  - Water: 0.019 sq mi (0.05 km^{2}) 1.57%
- Elevation: 79 ft (24 m)

Population (2020)
  - Total: 2,200
  - Density: 1,797.9/sq mi (694.16/km^{2})
- Time zone: UTC−05:00 (Eastern (EST))
  - Summer (DST): UTC−04:00 (Eastern (EDT))
- ZIP Code: 08512
- Area code: 609
- FIPS code: 34-15520
- GNIS feature ID: 02389369
- Website: www.cranburytownship.com

Cranbury is an unincorporated community and census-designated place (CDP) in Cranbury Township, Middlesex County, New Jersey, in the United States. As of the 2020 United States census, the CDP's population was 2,200. Unlike in some other New Jersey townships, the Cranbury CDP is only part of Cranbury Township.

== Geography ==
Cranbury is in southern Middlesex County, in the east-central part of Cranbury Township. U.S. Route 130 forms the eastern border of the CDP; the highway leads south 2 miles (3 km) to Hightstown and north 14 miles (23 km) to New Brunswick, the Middlesex county seat. Trenton, the state capital, is 15 miles (24 km) to the southwest.

According to the U.S. Census Bureau, the Cranbury CDP has a total area of 1.243 square miles (3.22 km^{2}), including 1.224 square miles (3.17 km^{2}) of land and 0.019 square miles (0.049 km^{2}) of water (1.53%). Cranbury Brook passes through the southern part of the community, flowing west to join the Millstone River at Princeton Junction. Via the Millstone, Cranbury is within the Raritan River watershed flowing to Lower New York Bay.

== Demographics ==
Historical population
Census	Pop.	Note	%±
1960	1,038		—
1970	1,253		20.7%
1980	5,909		371.6%
2000	2,008		—
2010	2,181		8.6%
2020	2,200		0.9%
Population sources: 1950 1960 1970; 1980 1990 2000; 2010 2020

Cranbury appeared as an unincorporated community in the 1960 U.S. census, The name ws changed to Cranbury Center in the 1970 U.S. census. The community was relisted as a census designated place in the 1980 U.S. census; and then deleted prior to the 1990 U.S. census. It was relisted as a CDP under the name Cranbury in the 2000 U.S. census.

=== 2020 census ===
Cranbury CDP, New Jersey – Racial and ethnic composition Note: the US Census treats Hispanic/Latino as an ethnic category. This table excludes Latinos from the racial categories and assigns them to a separate category. Hispanics/Latinos may be of any race.
Race / Ethnicity (NH = Non-Hispanic)	Pop 2000	Pop 2010	Pop 2020	% 2000	% 2010	% 2020
White alone (NH)	1,752	1,762	1,530	87.25%	80.79%	69.55%
Black or African American alone (NH)	37	86	82	1.84%	3.94%	3.73%
Native American or Alaska Native alone (NH)	0	0	0	0.00%	0.00%	0.00%
Asian alone (NH)	163	245	413	8.12%	11.23%	18.77%
Native Hawaiian or Pacific Islander alone (NH)	0	1	0	0.00%	0.05%	0.00%
Other race alone (NH)	1	2	7	0.05%	0.09%	0.32%
Mixed race or Multiracial (NH)	25	36	65	1.25%	1.65%	2.95%
Hispanic or Latino (any race)	30	49	103	1.49%	2.25%	4.68%
Total	2,008	2,181	2,200	100.00%	100.00%	100.00%

=== 2010 census ===
The 2010 United States census counted 2,181 people, 722 households, and 572 families in the CDP. The population density was 1,818.5 people per square mile (702.1 people/km^{2}). There were 745 housing units at an average density of 621.2 units per square mile (239.8 units/km^{2}). The racial makeup was 82.49% (1,799) White, 4.08% (89) Black or African American, 0.05% (1) Native American, 11.23% (245) Asian, 0.05% (1) Pacific Islander, 0.18% (4) from other races, and 1.93% (42) from two or more races. Hispanic or Latino of any race were 2.25% (49) of the population.

Of the 722 households, 44.9% had children under the age of 18; 69.3% were married couples living together; 7.9% had a female householder with no husband present and 20.8% were non-families. Of all households, 18.4% were made up of individuals and 6.5% had someone living alone who was 65 years of age or older. The average household size was 2.85 and the average family size was 3.29.

29.0% of the population were under the age of 18, 4.9% from 18 to 24, 16.5% from 25 to 44, 33.8% from 45 to 64, and 15.7% who were 65 years of age or older. The median age was 44.7 years. For every 100 females, the population had 92.7 males. For every 100 females ages 18 and older there were 84.9 males.

=== 2000 census ===
As of the 2000 United States census there were 2,008 people, 703 households, and 534 families living in the CDP. The population density was 625.2 people/km^{2} (1,619 people/mi^{2}). There were 728 housing units at an average density of 226.7 units/km^{2} (587 units/mi^{2}). The racial makeup of the CDP was 88.35% White, 1.89% African American, 8.12% Asian, 0.20% from other races, and 1.44% from two or more races. Hispanic or Latino of any race were 1.49% of the population.

There were 703 households, out of which 45.7% had children under the age of 18 living with them, 69.4% were married couples living together, 5.0% had a female householder with no husband present, and 23.9% were non-families. 20.3% of all households were made up of individuals, and 10.2% had someone living alone who was 65 years of age or older. The average household size was 2.79 and the average family size was 3.27.

In the CDP the population was spread out, with 30.9% under the age of 18, 2.4% from 18 to 24, 30.1% from 25 to 44, 23.3% from 45 to 64, and 13.2% who were 65 years of age or older. The median age was 39 years. For every 100 females, there were 91.2 males. For every 100 females age 18 and over, there were 86.2 males.

The median income for a household in the CDP was $104,444, and the median income for a family was $129,877. Males had a median income of $95,316 versus $44,500 for females. The per capita income for the CDP was $51,095. About 1.1% of families and 2.2% of the population were below the poverty line, including 4.0% of those under age 18 and 1.4% of those age 65 or over.
