= Cranberry Township, Avery County, North Carolina =

Township in Avery County, North Carolina, U.S.

Coordinates: 36°09′12″N 81°57′33″W

Cranberry Township is a township located in Avery County, North Carolina, United States.
