= Updike Parsonage Barn =

- Interactive map of the Updike Parsonage Barn area
- Former names: Howarth Barn
- Alternative names: Parsonage Barn

General information
- Type: Barn
- Location: Cranbury, New Jersey, Cranbury Neck Road
- Coordinates: 40°18′17″N 74°31′15″W
- Current tenants: Cranbury Historical and Preservation Society
- Completed: 1741
- Renovated: 2010
- Cost: $40,500

The Updike Parsonage Barn, formerly known as the Howarth Barn, is a restored historic barn in Cranbury, New Jersey. The pre-revolutionary, hand-hewn, white oak structure, believed to be one of the earliest barns constructed in Cranbury Township, was originally built in 1741.

In 2005, the town engaged the New Jersey Barn Company, specialists in the restoration of historic barns, to dismantle and store and at a later date repair and reconstruct its frame. It was re-built on a new foundation at its new location in 2010. The barn joined two existing historic agricultural buildings known as the wagon house and the corncrib on the site known as the Barn Park.

== See also ==
- List of the oldest buildings in New Jersey
