= Little Cranberry Lake (Digby) =

Lake in Digby County, Nova Scotia, Canada

- Location within Nova Scotia
- Location: Digby District, Nova Scotia
- Coordinates: 44.321283°N 65.735684°W
- Basin countries: Canada

Little Cranberry Lake is a lake of Digby District, in Nova Scotia, Canada.

== See also ==
- List of lakes in Nova Scotia
