= Cranberry, British Columbia =

Cranberry
- Location of Cranberry in British Columbia
- Coordinates: 49°53′00″N 124°32′00″W
- Country: Canada
- Province: British Columbia
- Time zone: UTC−07:00 (PT)
- Area codes: 250, 778

Cranberry, formerly Cranberry Lake, is a community and neighbourhood within Powell River, British Columbia, Canada. It was incorporated as the Village of Cranberry Lake in 1942 and was merged into Powell River in 1955 as that District Municipality was expanded. The settlement's original name derives from the lake of the same name, around which grew cranberries on the peat-rimmed shoreline. Because there was another Cranberry Post Office in British Columbia, the word "lake" was retained in the name of both post office and the village municipality although it has since been dropped since amalgamation into what is now the City of Powell River.
