= Cranberry, Luzerne County, Pennsylvania =

Unincorporated community in Pennsylvania, US

Cranberry, Pennsylvania
- Unincorporated community
- Location within Pennsylvania Location within the United States
- Coordinates: 40°57′14″N 75°59′52″W
- Country: United States
- State: Pennsylvania
- County: Luzerne
- Township: Hazle
- Elevation: 1,601 ft (488 m)
- Time zone: UTC-5 (Eastern (EST))
  - Summer (DST): UTC-4 (EDT)
- Area codes: 570 & 272
- GNIS feature ID: 1202233

Cranberry is an unincorporated community in Hazle Township, Luzerne County, Pennsylvania, United States.
