= Little Cranberry Lake (Washington) =

Lake of the United States of America

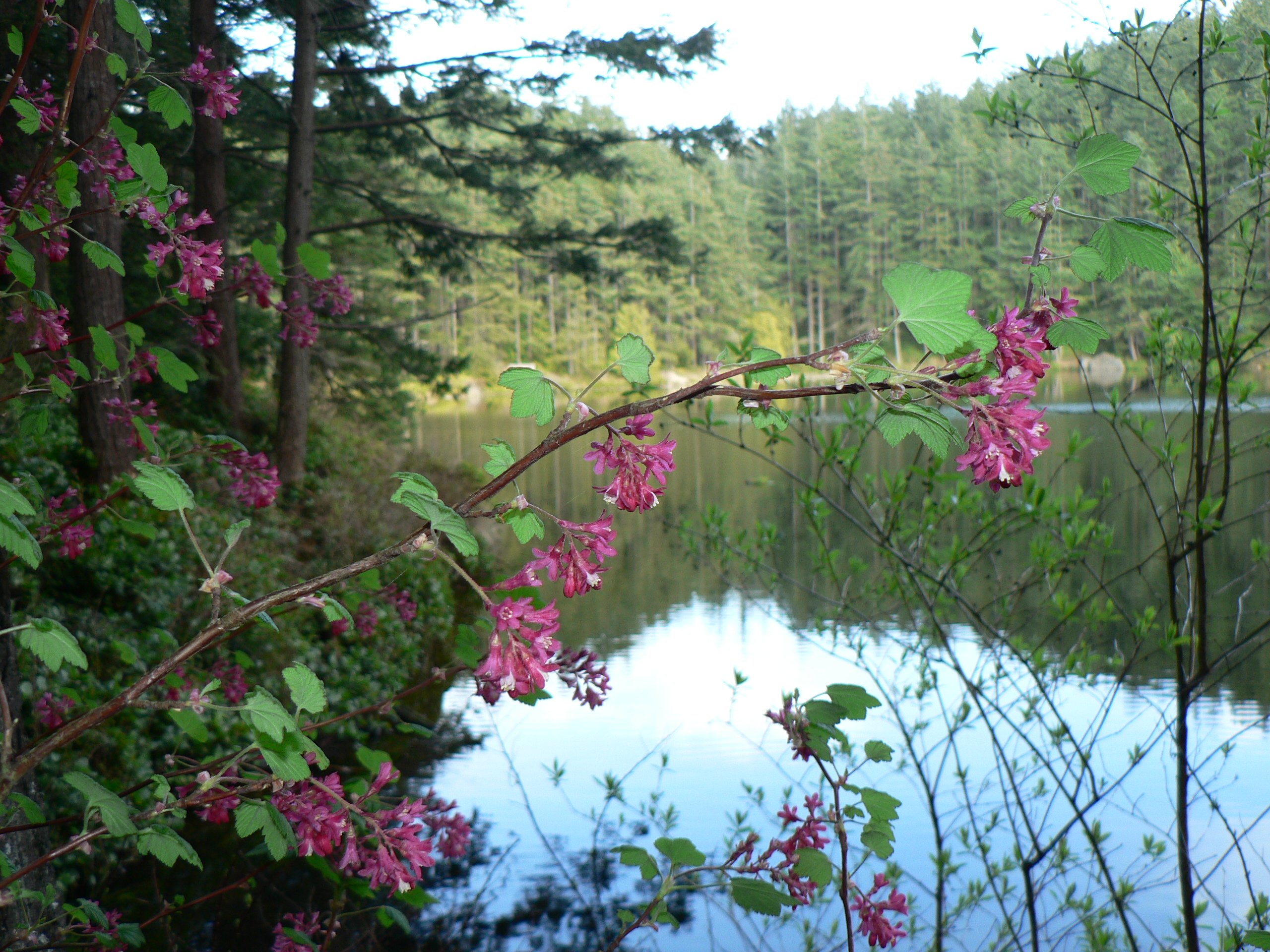
- Redflower currant with Little Cranberry Lake (behind)

- Location within Washington (state) Location within the United States
- Location: Anacortes, Washington
- Coordinates: 48°30′2.48″N 122°38′40.29″W
- Basin countries: United States
- Surface elevation: 279 ft (85 m)

Little Cranberry Lake is located within Anacortes Community Forest Lands on Fidalgo Island in the northwestern corner of the U.S. state of Washington. The lake is deepened by a dam on the northern end which was constructed in the 1930s. The previous dam had broken in 1921 releasing a large amount of water which crashed down the hills to the beach.

The lake basin is part of a 10-mile long, north-south wilderness corridor that roughly follows an ancient moraine, which snakes its way down the middle of the island. This moraine is a major source of gravel for the region which adjoins Anacortes, Washington. The trails in this corridor are maintained but are of variable quality. Almost all are ideal for mountain biking, in particular.

Little Cranberry Lake is a popular swimming location, especially for visitors to the annual summer music celebration, What the Heck Fest.

== Flora, fauna, and funga ==
Wildlife is plentiful and diverse. Coyotes, deer, beaver, grouse, pelicans, hawks, bald eagles, Canada geese, mallards, and many different varieties of reptiles and insects are plentiful in the Little Cranberry basin. Hunting is not allowed. To the south of the lake are swamplands whose size and depth has been increasing since approximately 1985, when the beavers moved in.

=== Rare species ===
Several varieties of orchids exist in this area that could be unique. The area around the lake was clearcut between 1890 and 1920 but some of the basin's less accessible trees, such as those on the southern end of the lake, are old growth. Until the 1950s locals say, morel mushrooms were extremely plentiful. As of 2005, morels are practically impossible to find.
