= Cranberry Lake (Nova Scotia) =

Cranberry Lake (Nova Scotia) may refer to:

== Annapolis County ==
- Cranberry Lake 44°47′50″N 65°7′44″W
- Cranberry Lake 44°36′4″N 65°27′7″W

== Cape Breton Regional Municipality ==
- Cranberry Lake 46°14′22″N 60°16′31″W
- Cranberry Lake 45°48′52″N 60°27′58″W

== Municipality of Clare ==
- Cranberry Lake 44°22′28″N 65°32′29″W
- Cranberry Lake 44°9′4″N 66°6′3″W

== Municipality of the District of Chester ==
- Cranberry Lake 44°40′38″N 64°12′12″W

== Colchester County ==
- Cranberry Lake 45°25′23″N 62°58′44″W

== Cumberland County ==
- Cranberry Lake 45°28′15″N 64°15′46″W

== Municipality of the District of Guysborough ==
- Cranberry Lake 45°14′40″N 61°31′8″W
- Cranberry Lake 45°29′39″N 61°17′49″W
- Cranberry Lake 45°11′37″N 61°23′30″W
- Cranberry Lake 45°18′32″N 61°22′0″W

== Halifax Regional Municipality ==
- Cranberry Lake 44°53′21″N 62°54′51″W
- Cranberry Lake 44°50′6″N 63°25′44″W
- Cranberry Lake 44°50′10″N 62°42′36″W
- Cranberry Lake 44°48′16″N 63°20′14″W
- Cranberry Lake 44°41′46″N 63°46′56″W
- Cranberry Lake 45°0′51″N 62°50′43″W
- Cranberry Lake 44°39′21″N 63°46′3″W
- Cranberry Lake 44°59′12″N 63°2′26″W
- Cranberry Lake 44°58′32″N 63°16′34″W
- Cranberry Lake 44°54′26″N 63°3′38″W
- Cranberry Lake 44°54′30″N 62°40′24″W
- Cranberry Lake 44°53′19″N 63°40′46″W
- Cranberry Lake 44°41′20.3″N 63°29′52.1″W
- Cranberry Lakes 44°33′37″N 63°40′46″W

== Inverness County ==
- Cranberry Lake 46°40′14″N 60°41′29″W

== Municipality of the District of Lunenburg ==
- Cranberry Lake 44°15′4″N 64°34′2″W
- Cranberry Lake 44°27′55″N 64°41′58″W
- Cranberry Lake 44°39′45″N 64°40′19″W

== Pictou County ==
- Cranberry Lake 45°22′17″N 62°17′36″W
- Cranberry Lake 45°21′11″N 62°41′38″W

== Region of Queens Municipality ==
- Cranberry Lake 44°29′22″N 64°56′30″W

== Richmond County ==
- Cranberry Lake 45°41′6″N 60°53′11″W

== Municipality of the District of Saint Mary's ==
- Cranberry Lake 45°12′39″N 61°53′52″W
- Cranberry Lake 45°14′21″N 62°12′20″W
- Cranberry Lake 45°19′59″N 62°1′17″W
- Cranberry Lake 45°17′52″N 62°15′4″W
- Cranberry Lakes 45°11′10″N 62°1′49″W

== Municipality of the District of Shelburne ==
- Cranberry Lake 44°4′31″N 65°26′39″W

== Municipality of the District of Yarmouth ==
- Cranberry Lake 43°57′41″N 65°50′9″W

== Rivers ==
- Cranberry Lake Brook Shelburne at 44°4′0″N 65°26′57″W
- Cranberry Lake Brook Shelburne at 44°59′0″N 63°3′57″W
