= Little Cranberry Lake (Halifax) =

Lake in Nova Scotia, Canada

- Location within Nova Scotia
- Location: Halifax Regional Municipality, Nova Scotia
- Coordinates: 44°50′12″N 62°41′41″W
- Basin countries: Canada

Little Cranberry Lake, Halifax is a lake of Halifax Regional Municipality, Nova Scotia, Canada.

== See also ==
- List of lakes in Nova Scotia
