= Cranbury School District =

School district in Middlesex County, New Jersey, US

Address
- 23 North Main Street Cranbury, Middlesex County, New Jersey, 08512; United States
- Coordinates: 40.3120°N 74.5188°W

District information
- Grades: PreK to 8
- Superintendent: Jennifer K. Diszler
- Business administrator: Karin Weiner
- Schools: 1

Students and staff
- Enrollment: 442 (as of 2023–24)
- Faculty: 57.0 FTEs
- Student–teacher ratio: 7.8:1

Other information
- District Factor Group: J
- Website: www.cranburyschool.org
Ind.	Per pupil	District spending	Rank (*)	K-8 average	%± vs. average
1A	Total Spending	$21,866	56	$18,891	15.7%
1	Budgetary Cost	17,460	57	14,159	23.3%
2	Classroom Instruction	10,495	57	8,659	21.2%
6	Support Services	2,544	47	2,167	17.4%
8	Administrative Cost	1,695	33	1,547	9.6%
10	Operations & Maintenance	2,352	62	1,612	45.9%
13	Extracurricular Activities	348	64	104	234.6%
16	Median Teacher Salary	57,200	19	61,136
Data from NJDoE 2014 Taxpayers' Guide to Education Spending. *Of K-8 districts with 401-750 students. Lowest spending=1; Highest=64

Cranbury School District is a public school district located in and serving students in pre-kindergarten through eighth grade from Cranbury, in Middlesex County, in the U.S. state of New Jersey.

As of the 2023–24 school year, the district, comprised of one school, had an enrollment of 442 students and 57.0 classroom teachers (on an FTE basis), for a student–teacher ratio of 7.8:1.

The district had been classified by the New Jersey Department of Education as being in District Factor Group "J", the highest of eight groupings. District Factor Groups organize districts statewide to allow comparison by common socioeconomic characteristics of the local districts. From lowest socioeconomic status to highest, the categories are A, B, CD, DE, FG, GH, I and J.

Since 1991, ninth through twelfth grade public school students have gone to Princeton High School, located in Princeton, as part of a sending/receiving relationship with the Princeton Public Schools. Cranbury Township is granted a seat on the Princeton Regional Schools board of education, with the designated representative restricted to voting on issues pertaining to Princeton High School and district-wide issues. As of the 2023–24 school year, the high school had an enrollment of 1,532 students and 130.2 classroom teachers (on an FTE basis), for a student–teacher ratio of 11.8:1.

== History ==
- Old Cranbury School
- U.S. National Register of Historic Places
- New Jersey Register of Historic Places
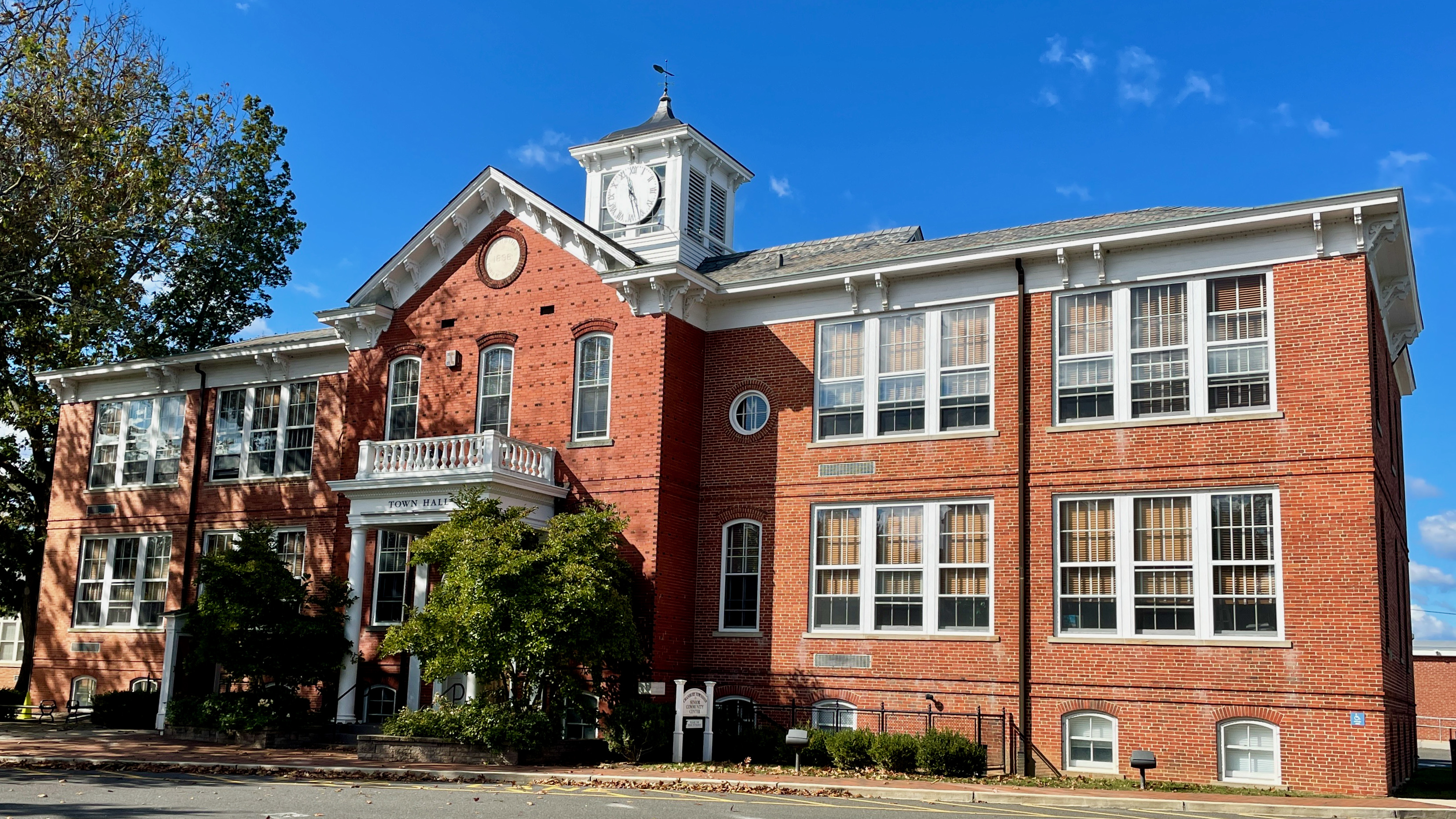
- Old Cranbury School, now the Town Hall

- Location within Middlesex County, New Jersey Location within New Jersey Location within the United States
- Location: 23 N. Main Street, Cranbury, New Jersey
- Coordinates: 40°18′42″N 74°31′02″W
- Area: 1 acre (0.40 ha)
- Built: 1897
- NRHP reference No.: 71000508
- NJRHP No.: 1832

Significant dates
- Added to NRHP: June 21, 1971
- Designated NJRHP: May 6, 1971

Originally two public schools, the Bunker Hill School and the South Cranbury School, were established in 1850. On May 25, 1896, voters approved the construction of a consolidated grade school that would replace the Bunker Hill School and the South Cranbury School. Construction on the school began in August 1896 and ended in January 1897. The school opened on January 25, 1897, with a population of 159 students. The school was dedicated on February 22, 1897. The Cranbury School had three departments: primary, grammar, and high school.

Cranbury Neck School closed in 1903, and the students who attended Cranbury Neck attended Cranbury School after their school closed. In 1906, a south wing with two classrooms was added to the Cranbury School building.

Wyckoff Mills School closed in 1910, and the students also attended Cranbury School after their school closed.

In 1922, a North wing was added to the Cranbury School building, bringing enrollment to 200 students.

In 1924, the Cranbury Library moved into the Cranbury School building The Cranbury Public Library moved into a temporary building outside of the school in 2020.

The school building received additions in 1949, 1957, and 1967.

The Old Cranbury School was added to the National Register of Historic Places on June 21, 1971 for its significance in architecture and education. It is a two story brick building and features a cupola with the school bell and a clock facing Main Street.

In 1969, a new school replaced the old facility. The new facility received an addition in 1997. On October 14, 2001, the old school building was rededicated as Cranbury Township's town hall. The old school building also houses the Cranbury Township Board of education offices and the Gourgaud Gallery, an art gallery.

Cranbury students had attended Hightstown High School and then Lawrence High School before the relationship was established with Princeton.

== Awards and recognition ==
For the 1996–97 school year, Cranbury School was formally designated as a National Blue Ribbon School, the highest honor that an American public school can achieve. During the 2009–10 school year, Cranbury School was awarded the Blue Ribbon School Award of Excellence a second time. The school was recognized again in 2016–17.

== School ==
Cranbury School had an enrollment of 438 students in grades PreK-8 as of the 2023–24 school year.

- Jennifer K. Diszler, principal

== Administration ==
Core members of the district's administration are:

- Jennifer K. Diszler, chief school administrator
- Karin Weiner, business administrator and board secretary

== Board of education ==
The district's board of education is comprised of nine members who set policy and oversee the fiscal and educational operation of the district through its administration. As a Type II school district, the board's trustees are elected directly by voters to serve three-year terms of office on a staggered basis, with three seats up for election each year held (since 2014) as part of the November general election. The board appoints a superintendent to oversee the district's day-to-day operations and a business administrator to supervise the business functions of the district.
