= Cranbury Station, New Jersey =

Populated place in Middlesex County, New Jersey, US

- Unincorporated community
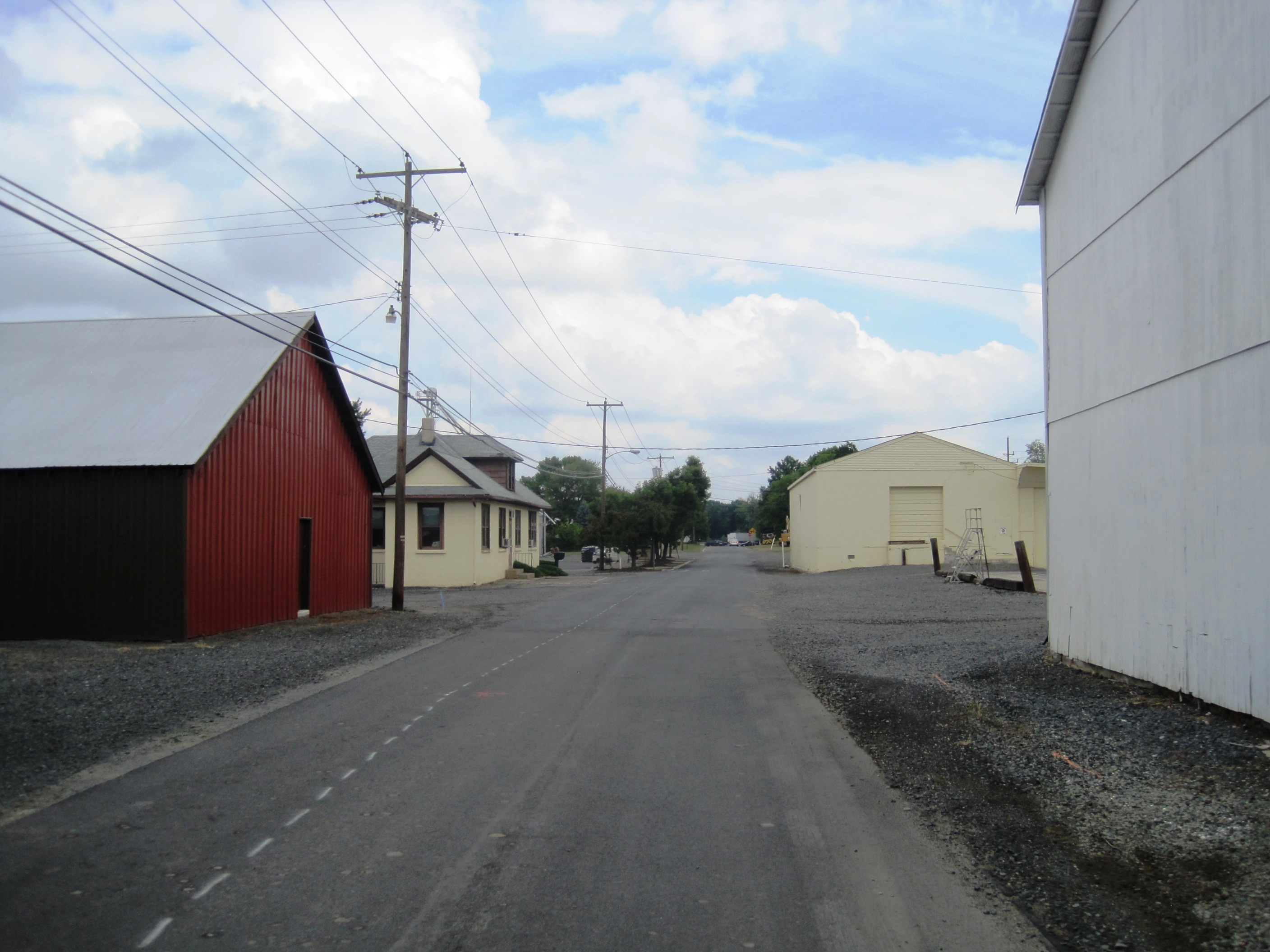
- Along Hightstown-Cranbury Station Road

- Location of Cranbury Station in Middlesex County Inset: Location of county within the state of New Jersey Cranbury Station (New Jersey) Cranbury Station (the United States)
- Coordinates: 40°18′07″N 74°29′31″W
- Country: United States
- State: New Jersey
- County: Middlesex
- Township: Cranbury
- Elevation: 121 ft (37 m)
- GNIS feature ID: 875706

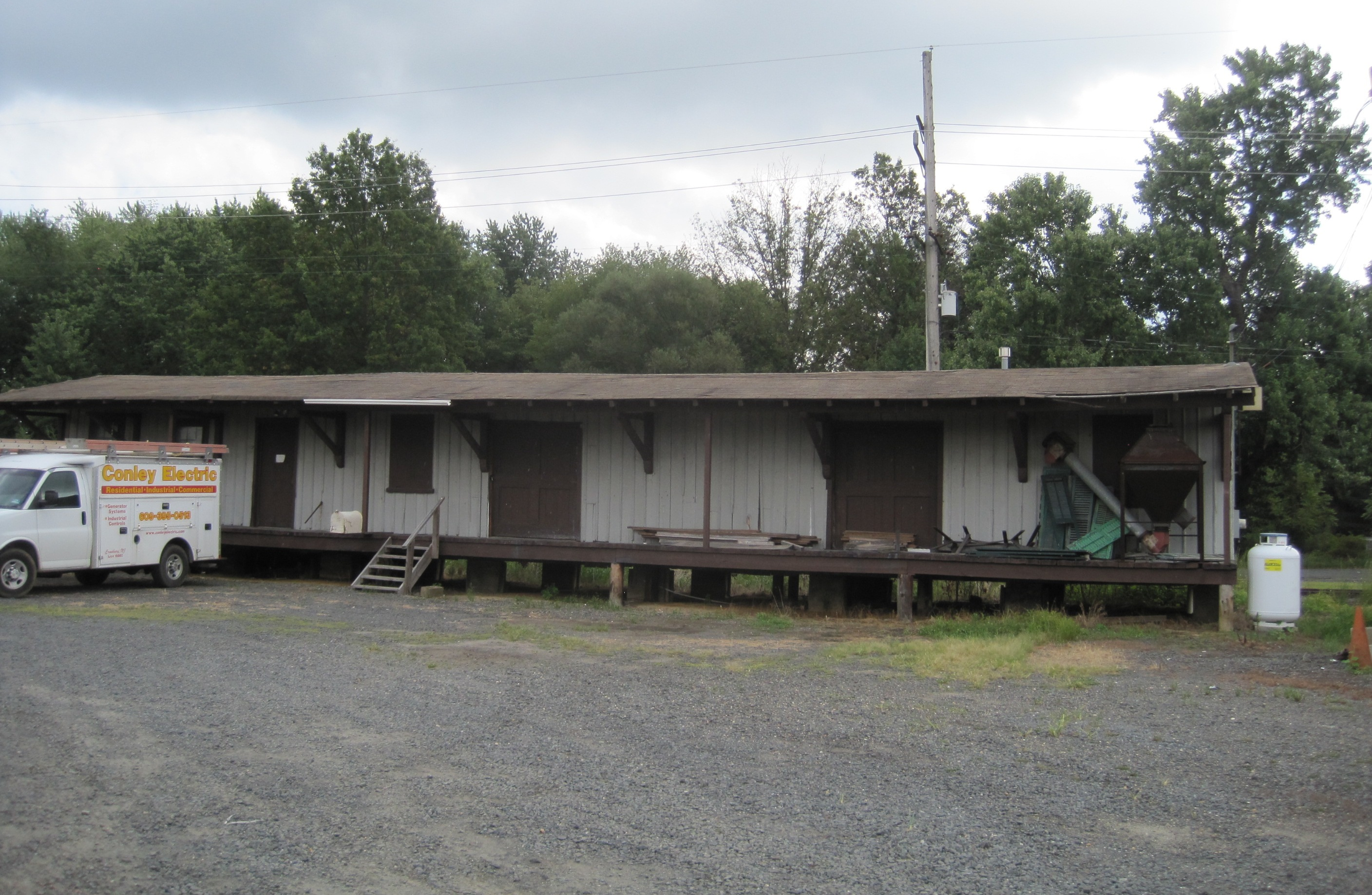
Building that formerly housed the railroad station

Cranbury Station is an unincorporated community located within Cranbury Township in Middlesex County, in the U.S. state of New Jersey. The area immediately around the site of the former railroad station along the Camden and Amboy Railroad contains agricultural businesses and small homes. Hightstown-Cranbury Station Road is the main road through the settlement paralleling the railroad and Station Road (County Route 615) as a major road heading east and west through the area. Modern warehouses line Station Road and the nearby New Jersey Turnpike west of the station while large housing developments are located east of here in Monroe Township.
