= Cranberry, Venango County, Pennsylvania =

Unincorporated community in Pennsylvania, US

Cranberry, Pennsylvania
- Unincorporated community
- Location within Pennsylvania Location within the United States
- Coordinates: 41°20′59″N 79°42′36″W
- Country: United States
- State: Pennsylvania
- County: Venango
- Elevation: 1,417 ft (432 m)
- Time zone: UTC-5 (Eastern (EST))
  - Summer (DST): UTC-4 (EDT)
- Area code: 814
- GNIS feature ID: 1172615

Cranberry (also Cranberry Village, Salina) is an unincorporated community in Cranberry Township, Venango County, Pennsylvania, United States.
