= James Edward Daniels =

American serial killer

- Born: 1940; Brooklyn, New York City, U.S.
- Died: May 7, 1984 (aged 44); Penn Medicine Princeton Medical Center, Plainsboro Township, New Jersey, U.S.
- Cause of death: Injuries sustained in a car accident
- Conviction: Murder
- Penalty: 50-years-to-life

Details
- Victims: 4
- Span of crimes: 1963–1984
- Country: United States
- States: New York, New Jersey
- Date apprehended: Died before apprehension

James Edward Daniels (1940 – May 7, 1984) was an American serial killer. Originally sentenced to 50-years-to-life for a 1963 murder in New York, he was later paroled before committing a double homicide and the murder of a New Jersey state trooper from March to May 1984. While fleeing the scene of his final crime, he and a friend were killed in a car crash on Route 33.

== Early crimes and first murder ==
Little is known of Daniels's early life. A native of Brooklyn born in 1940, he was first arrested in early 1960 for assaulting a man in Queens with a zip gun, for which he served two years in prison. Less than a year after his release, he and five other men were charged with the second-degree murder in relation to the March 1963 death of Calvin Dean, who was running a craps game in Ozone Park. Daniels was convicted for his role in the crime and was given a 50-year-to-life term, which he served at the Green Haven Correctional Facility in Beekman.

While incarcerated there, Daniels undertook vocational training to become a barber, played on the prison's football team and enrolled in black studies and political science courses. He befriended students from the nearby SUNY New Paltz who had come to work as prison volunteers, including some who were originally from Oregon.

=== Release and legal troubles in Oregon ===
After serving 13 years of his sentence, Daniels was paroled on February 8, 1976, due to changes in the state's penal law that affected mandatory minimum sentencing. In September 1977, he moved to Portland, Oregon, in an attempt to rebuild his life. Whilst living there, he married, had a daughter and worked as an aide to an alcohol detoxification facility, which did not run a pre-emptive background check.

During his tenure there, some people started complaining that Daniels was stealing their money. Due to this, several sheriff's deputies disguised themselves as drunks and attempted to catch him in the act, and on August 11, 1978, Daniels was arrested on charges of stealing $91 from one of them. He steadfastly denied responsibility and was tried twice for the crime – after the first trial resulted in a hung jury and the second in a mistrial – the charges were dismissed on the conditions that he voluntarily return to New York.

Daniels eventually moved into a flat in St. Albans. While his parole was not revoked due to the fact that he had not been convicted, he soon absconded from New York without permission and an arrest warrant was issued for him. While the authorities were unable to determine the exact reason why, Daniels's brother and his friends alleged that he had become so embittered with the authorities that he vowed to "go hard" and never spend another day in prison.

== Double murder and manhunt ==
On the early morning of March 19, 1984, police in Queens received a report from a concerned citizen who said that he had found the body of a man, who had apparently been shot to death, inside a parked U-Haul truck. A quick check determined that the truck had been stolen, and that the deceased man was 29-year-old Ira Adams, a local criminal who had repeatedly been arrested for burglary and grand larceny. After finding a note with an address written down on it, the officers determined that it was only six blocks away, so they decided to check it. Once they entered, they found the body of 21-year-old Karen Jefferson, Adams's live-in girlfriend, who had been shot in the head and chest.

Less than a week after their murders, both state and federal authorities issued an arrest warrant for Daniels, who had become the prime suspect in the killings after being identified by a witness. According to the detectives, he and Adams had been part of a burglary ring that specialized in stealing various household items around Queens, but the pair got into a dispute over money that resulted in Adams being killed, with Daniels supposedly killing Jefferson to get rid of any potential witnesses. As he was now a wanted fugitive, stake-outs were set up in Brooklyn and Queens in an attempt to catch Daniels, but their efforts proved fruitless. Unbeknownst to authorities, he was living in an old van he owned and had temporarily traveled to Durham, North Carolina, to evade arrest, but would later return to Queens.

== Murder of Carlos Negron and death ==
In the early morning hours of May 7, 1984, Daniels and a friend, 40-year-old Bezilel (or Lenel) Hutchinson, had made a temporary stop along the New Jersey Turnpike near East Windsor when they were approached by 29-year-old Carlos Negron, a state trooper who mistakenly believed that they had car trouble. After reporting his location to colleagues in East Brunswick, he got out of his car and walked towards the van, whereupon Daniels opened fire on him. A short gunfight erupted, but Negron was fatally wounded, having been shot thrice in the chest and once in the ribs, causing him to fall halfway on the way back to his vehicle.

Daniels and Hutchinson soon abandoned the van and fled to the nearby woods, continuing to fire shots at the wounded officer. They ran until they reached a service center in nearby Hightstown, where they held the three employees at gunpoint, tied them up with telephone cords and stole the company van. As they were speeding along State Route 33, they were engaged in a high-speed chase by Trooper Thomas Suscewicz, who was soon joined by another colleague and two police cars from East Windsor. In Suscewicz's account, the suspects' van suddenly swerved out of control and crashed into a high-tension utility pole, plunged down an embankment and overturned.

The incident was immediately reported to the nearby police and medical authorities, who quickly dragged the two men out of the van and drove them to the Penn Medicine Princeton Medical Center in Plainsboro Township for emergency treatment. Not long after, both Daniels and Hutchinson were pronounced dead – coincidentally, Negron, who had also been admitted at the medical center, had also been pronounced dead a short time prior.

=== Aftermath ===
Shortly after his death, state authorities searched Daniels's van and uncovered a quantity of ammunition, an outdoor survival manual and a letter addressed to a man named "Dahruba". As the letter supposedly included the sentence "Assata is fine and sends her regards", some assumed this might be a reference to Assata Shakur, a member of the Black Liberation Army and wanted fugitive who had escaped prison in New Jersey, where she was serving a prison sentence for killing a state trooper during a shootout. Due to the parallels between the two cases, and Daniels having boasted about having links with black supremacist groups in the past, it was suggested that there might be some correlation. Authorities quickly dismissed this theory, as assistant deputy director for the FBI Kenneth Walton said that the letter likely did not belong to Daniels, but to his former cellmate, Anatye Dahruba, a former member of the Black Liberation Army serving a life term at a New York prison.

Five days after his death, Negron was buried with all honors in a special ceremony dedicated to him. His death caused some legislators to consider drafting a bill to increase patrol sizes to prevent further incidents like this.

== See also ==
- List of serial killers in the United States
