= John Van Buren Wicoff House =

- U.S. National Register of Historic Places
- New Jersey Register of Historic Places
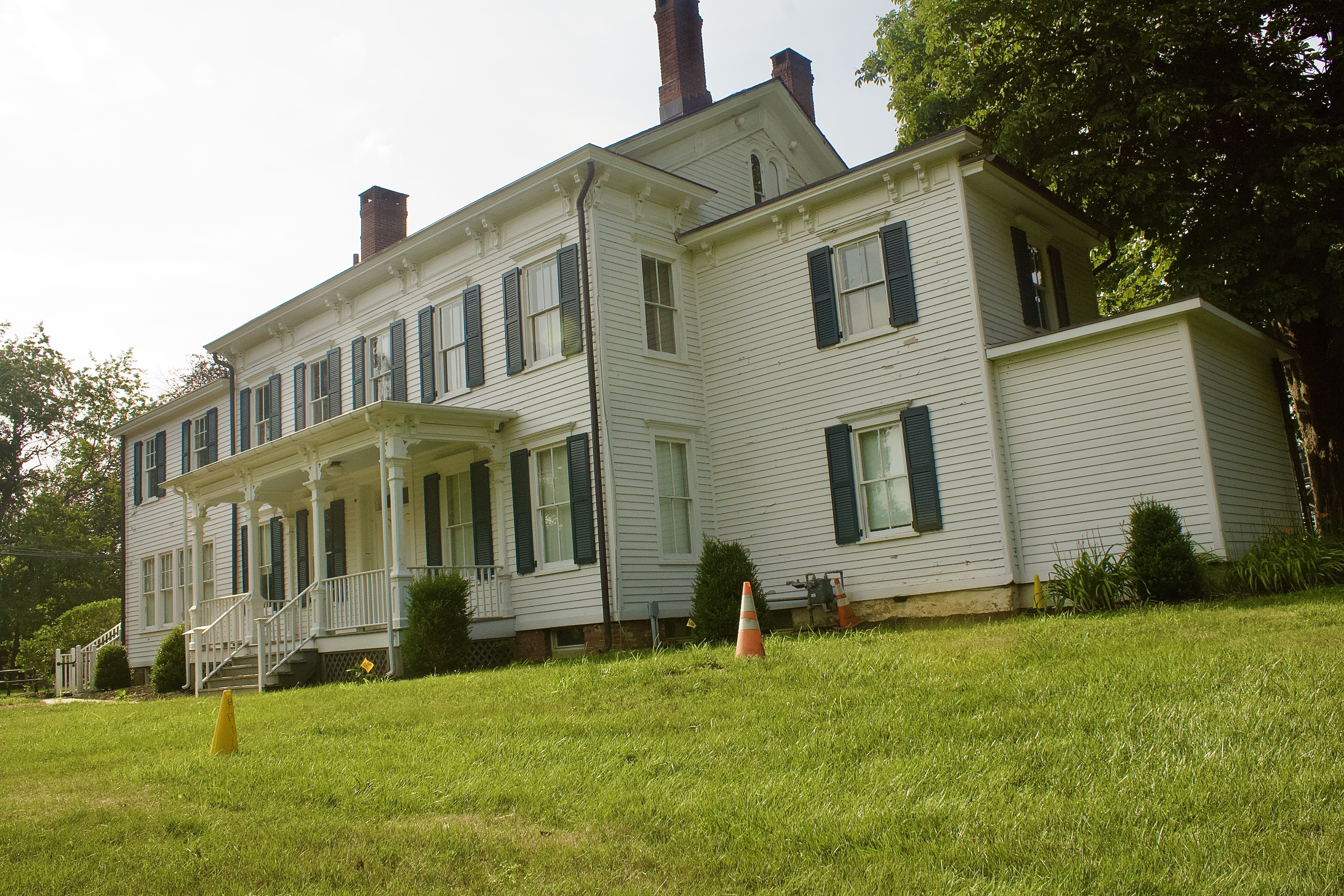

- Location within Middlesex County, New Jersey Location within New Jersey Location within the United States
- Location: 641 Plainsboro Road, Plainsboro, New Jersey
- Coordinates: 40°19′59″N 74°35′06″W
- Area: 3 acres (1.2 ha)
- Architect: W.A. Klemann; Klemann & Fowler
- Architectural style: Italianate
- NRHP reference No.: 98000236
- NJRHP No.: 361

Significant dates
- Added to NRHP: March 12, 1998
- Designated NJRHP: February 2, 1988

The John Van Buren Wicoff House is a historic building located at 641 Plainsboro Road in the township of Plainsboro in Middlesex County, New Jersey. It was added to the National Register of Historic Places on September 12, 1979, for its significance in politics/government from 1907 to 1947. It is currently a historic house museum, known as the Historic Wicoff House Museum.

== History and description ==
In 1872, Catharine Lucretia Britton acquired 104 acres (42 ha) here following her father's death. On February 3, 1875, she married John Wicoff and moved here. The house likely dates to this time. On June 8, 1878, their only child, John Van Buren (J.V.B.) Wicoff was born. He graduated from Princeton University in 1900 and became a locally prominent attorney, politician, banker, and farmer. He served as the twenty-seventh Governor General of the Order of the Founders and Patriots of America from 1941 to 1942. He lived in the house until his death in 1952. It was purchased by Township of Plainsboro in 1977 for use as a municipal center. Starting in 1995, the Plainsboro Historical Society operated a museum in the house.

The house is a two story frame building featuring Italianate style. Elements of Classical Revival style were added in 1929 when the house was expanded and altered.

== See also ==
- National Register of Historic Places listings in Middlesex County, New Jersey
- List of museums in New Jersey
