= Schalks, New Jersey =

Populated place in Middlesex County, New Jersey, US

- Unincorporated community
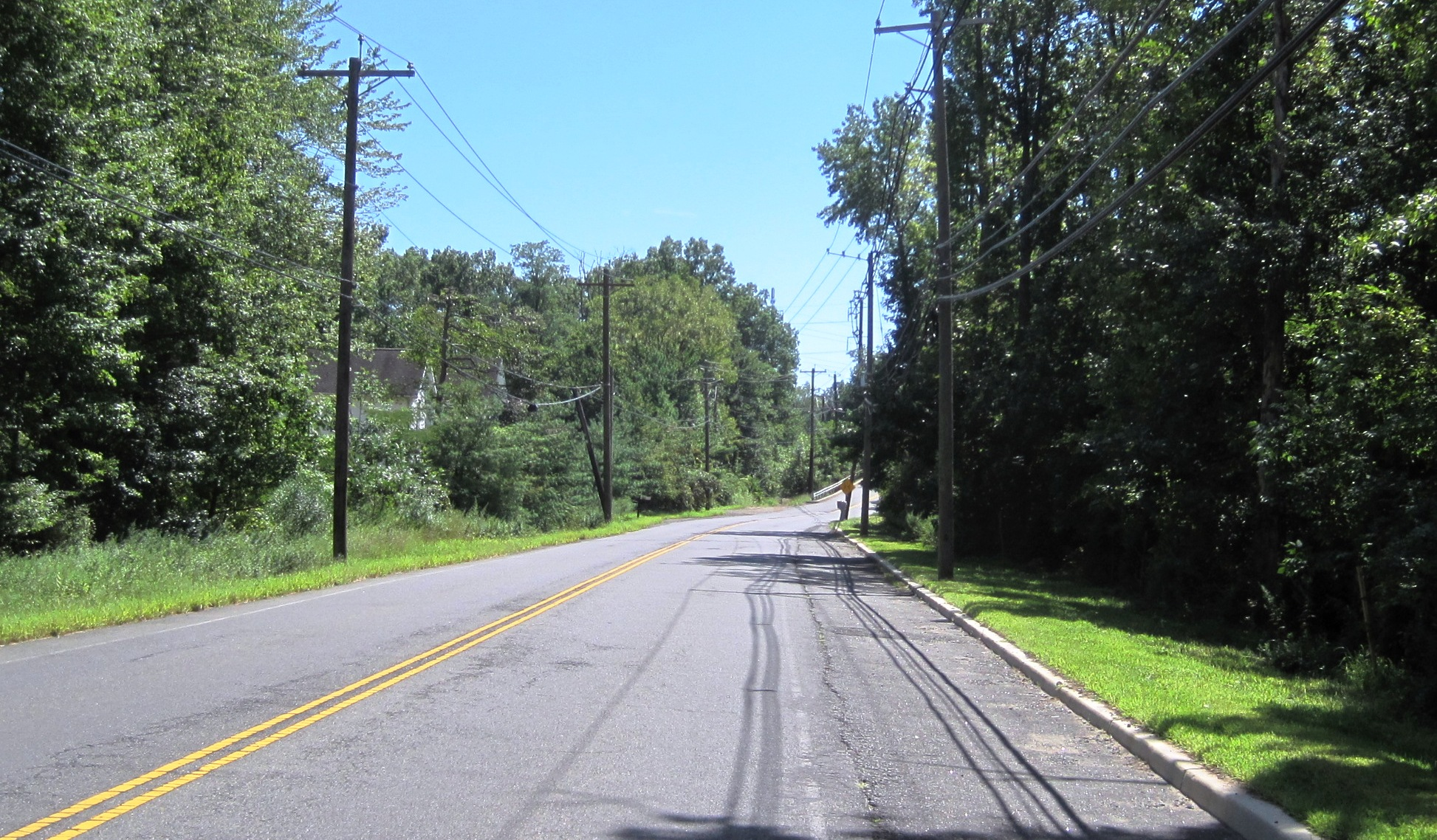
- South along Schalks Crossing Road (CR 683) approaching the Northeast Corridor overpass

- Location of Schalks in Middlesex County Inset: Location of county within the state of New Jersey Schalks (New Jersey) Schalks (the United States)
- Coordinates: 40°20′33″N 74°35′31″W
- Country: United States
- State: New Jersey
- County: Middlesex
- Township: Plainsboro
- Elevation: 66 ft (20 m)
- GNIS feature ID: 880288

Schalks or Schalks Station is an unincorporated community located within Plainsboro Township in Middlesex County, in the U.S. state of New Jersey. Located along Schalks Crossing Road (County Route 683) at its junction with the Northeast Corridor railroad tracks, the area contains single-family homes, forested areas, a former research nuclear reactor built by Industrial Reactor Laboratories, and the rear yards to offices within the Princeton Forrestal Center.
