= Princeton Meadows, New Jersey =

Populated place in Middlesex County, New Jersey, US

- Census-designated place
- Location of Princeton Meadows in Middlesex County highlighted in red (left). Inset map: Location of Middlesex County in New Jersey highlighted in orange (right).

- Location in Middlesex County Location in New Jersey Location in the United States
- Coordinates: 40.333922°N 74.566133°W
- Country: United States
- State: New Jersey
- County: Middlesex
- Township: Plainsboro

Area
  - Total: 2.59 sq mi (6.71 km^{2})
  - Land: 2.55 sq mi (6.60 km^{2})
  - Water: 0.042 sq mi (0.11 km^{2}) 1.79%
- Elevation: 85 ft (26 m)

Population (2020)
  - Total: 14,776
  - Density: 5,794.5/sq mi (2,237.3/km^{2})
- Time zone: UTC−05:00 (Eastern (EST))
  - Summer (DST): UTC−04:00 (Eastern (EDT))
- ZIP Codes: 08536 (Plainsboro); 08512 (Cranbury)
- Area code: 609
- FIPS code: 34-60975
- GNIS feature ID: 02389709

Princeton Meadows is an unincorporated community and census-designated place (CDP) in Plainsboro Township, Middlesex County, New Jersey, United States. As of the 2020 census, the population was 14,776.

== Geography ==
The community is in southwestern Middlesex County, in the eastern part of Plainsboro Township. It is bordered to the west by Plainsboro Center. The borough of Princeton is 6 miles (10 km) to the west, Cranbury is 4 miles (6 km) to the southeast, and New Brunswick, the Middlesex county seat, is 15 miles (24 km) to the northeast.

According to the U.S. Census Bureau, the Princeton Meadows CDP has an area of 2.59 square miles (6.71 km^{2}), including 2.55 square miles (6.60 km^{2}) of land and 0.04 square miles (0.10 km^{2}) of water (1.62%). Shallow Brook runs along the northern edge of the community, while Cedar Brook and Cranbury Brook form the southern edge. The entire community is within the drainage area of the Millstone River, part of the larger Raritan River watershed.

== Demographics ==
Historical population
| Census | Pop. | Note | %± |
|---|---|---|---|
| 2000 | 13,436 | | — |
| 2010 | 13,834 | | 3.0% |
| 2020 | 14,776 | | 6.8% |
Population sources: 1950 1960 1970; 1980 1990 2000; 2010 2020

Princeton Meadows first appeared as a census designated place in the 2000 U.S. census.

=== Racial and ethnic composition ===
Princeton Meadows CDP, New Jersey – Racial and ethnic composition Note: the US Census treats Hispanic/Latino as an ethnic category. This table excludes Latinos from the racial categories and assigns them to a separate category. Hispanics/Latinos may be of any race.
| Race / Ethnicity (NH = Non-Hispanic) | Pop 2000 | Pop 2010 | Pop 2020 | % 2000 | % 2010 | % 2020 |
|---|---|---|---|---|---|---|
| White alone (NH) | 7,155 | 4,718 | 3,384 | 53.25% | 34.10% | 22.90% |
| Black or African American alone (NH) | 1,257 | 1,342 | 1,225 | 9.36% | 9.70% | 8.29% |
| Native American or Alaska Native alone (NH) | 17 | 37 | 41 | 0.13% | 0.27% | 0.28% |
| Asian alone (NH) | 4,022 | 6,330 | 8,648 | 29.93% | 45.76% | 58.53% |
| Native Hawaiian or Pacific Islander alone (NH) | 0 | 2 | 1 | 0.00% | 0.01% | 0.01% |
| Other race alone (NH) | 45 | 35 | 75 | 0.33% | 0.25% | 0.51% |
| Mixed race or Multiracial (NH) | 232 | 311 | 362 | 1.73% | 2.25% | 2.45% |
| Hispanic or Latino (any race) | 708 | 1,059 | 1,040 | 5.27% | 7.66% | 7.04% |
| Total | 13,436 | 13,834 | 14,776 | 100.00% | 100.00% | 100.00% |

=== 2020 census ===
As of the 2020 census, Princeton Meadows had a population of 14,776. The median age was 34.4 years. 23.0% of residents were under the age of 18 and 6.4% of residents were 65 years of age or older. For every 100 females there were 99.0 males, and for every 100 females age 18 and over there were 98.6 males age 18 and over.

99.3% of residents lived in urban areas, while 0.7% lived in rural areas.

There were 6,154 households in Princeton Meadows, of which 36.1% had children under the age of 18 living in them. Of all households, 50.0% were married-couple households, 21.1% were households with a male householder and no spouse or partner present, and 22.8% were households with a female householder and no spouse or partner present. About 29.6% of all households were made up of individuals and 4.0% had someone living alone who was 65 years of age or older.

There were 6,507 housing units, of which 5.4% were vacant. The homeowner vacancy rate was 0.8% and the rental vacancy rate was 5.8%.

=== 2010 census ===
The 2010 United States census counted 13,834 people, 5,976 households, and 3,448 families in the CDP. The population density was 6,659.2 people per square mile (2,571.1 people/km^{2}). There were 6,290 housing units at an average density of 3,027.8 units per square mile (1,169.0 units/km^{2}). The racial makeup was 38.31% (5,300) White, 10.31% (1,426) Black or African American, 0.35% (48) Native American, 45.85% (6,343) Asian, 0.02% (3) Pacific Islander, 2.24% (310) from other races, and 2.92% (404) from two or more races. Hispanic or Latino of any race were 7.66% (1,059) of the population.

Of the 5,976 households, 34.4% had children under the age of 18; 47.1% were married couples living together; 8.3% had a female householder with no husband present and 42.3% were non-families. Of all households, 34.6% were made up of individuals and 2.0% had someone living alone who was 65 years of age or older. The average household size was 2.31 and the average family size was 3.09.

23.8% of the population were under the age of 18, 6.9% from 18 to 24, 41.1% from 25 to 44, 24.3% from 45 to 64, and 4.0% who were 65 years of age or older. The median age was 33.2 years. For every 100 females, the population had 99.8 males. For every 100 females ages 18 and older there were 98.6 males.

The median value of owner-occupied housing units was $350,100, and 72.8% of housing units were in multi-unit structures. The homeownership rate was 38.6%

=== 2000 census ===
As of the 2000 United States census there were 13,436 people, 6,017 households, and 3,255 families living in the CDP. The population density was 2,390.6 people/km^{2} (6,192 people/mi^{2}). There were 6,205 housing units at an average density of 1,104.0 units/km^{2} (2,859 units/mi^{2}). The racial makeup of the CDP was 56.16% White, 9.64% African American, 0.13% Native American, 30.05% Asian, 1.71% from other races, and 2.31% from two or more races. Hispanic or Latino of any race were 5.27% of the population.

There were 6,017 households, out of which 32.4% had children under the age of 18 living with them, 44.7% were married couples living together, 7.5% had a female householder with no husband present, and 45.9% were non-families. 37.1% of all households were made up of individuals, and 1.2% had someone living alone who was 65 years of age or older. The average household size was 2.22 and the average family size was 3.06.

In the CDP the population was spread out, with 24.3% under the age of 18, 7.3% from 18 to 24, 49.0% from 25 to 44, 17.0% from 45 to 64, and 2.4% who were 65 years of age or older. The median age was 32 years. For every 100 females, there were 103.0 males. For every 100 females age 18 and over, there were 102.1 males.

The median income for a household in the CDP was $66,415, and the median income for a family was $80,134. Males had a median income of $57,000 versus $43,481 for females. The per capita income for the CDP was $36,654. About 1.4% of families and 3.4% of the population were below the poverty line, including 2.0% of those under age 18 and none of those age 65 or over.
