= Plainsboro Center, New Jersey =

Populated place in Middlesex County, New Jersey, US

- Census-designated place
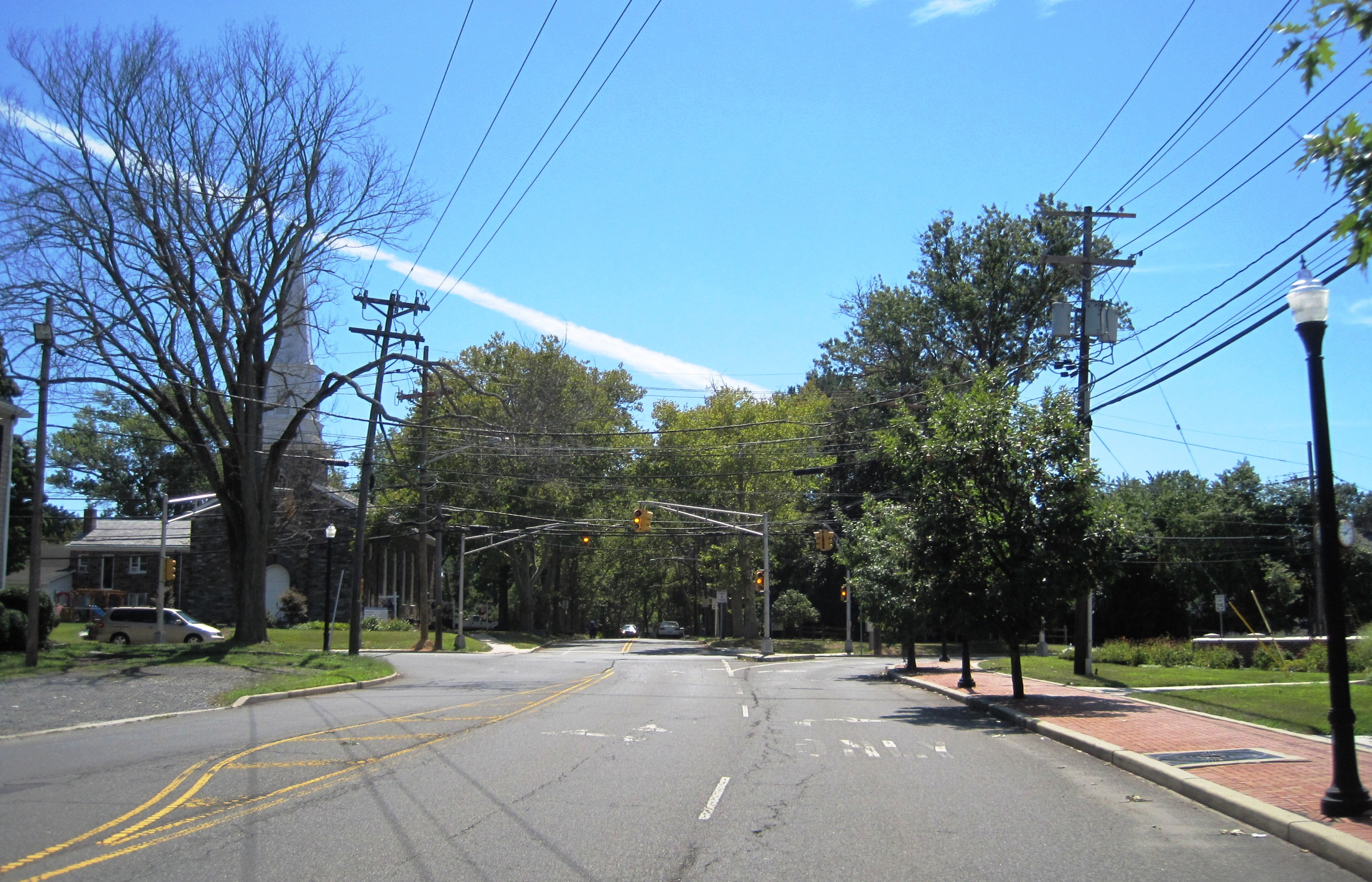
- Intersection of Schalks Crossing Road / Edgemere Avenue and Plainsboro Road

- Location of Plainsboro Center in Middlesex County highlighted in red (left). Location of Middlesex County in New Jersey highlighted in orange (right).

- Location in Middlesex County Location in New Jersey Location in the United States
- Coordinates: 40.332213°N 74.589986°W
- Country: United States
- State: New Jersey
- County: Middlesex
- Township: Plainsboro

Area
  - Total: 0.76 sq mi (1.96 km^{2})
  - Land: 0.73 sq mi (1.90 km^{2})
  - Water: 0.023 sq mi (0.06 km^{2}) 0.42%
- Elevation: 72 ft (22 m)

Population (2020)
  - Total: 2,760
  - Density: 3,755.0/sq mi (1,449.81/km^{2})
- Time zone: UTC−05:00 (Eastern (EST))
  - Summer (DST): UTC−04:00 (Eastern (EDT))
- Area code: 609
- FIPS code: 34-68304
- GNIS feature ID: 02390310

Plainsboro Center is an unincorporated community and census-designated place (CDP) in Plainsboro Township, Middlesex County, New Jersey, United States. As of the 2020 census, the CDP's population was 2,760, its highest decennial count ever and an increase of 48 (+1.8%) from the 2,712 recorded at the 2010 census.

== Geography ==
The community is in southwestern Middlesex County and occupies south-central Plainsboro Township. The CDP is bordered to the east by Princeton Meadows. The borough of Princeton is 5 miles (8 km) to the west, Cranbury is the same distance to the east, and New Brunswick, the Middlesex county seat, is 14 miles (23 km) to the northeast.

According to the U.S. Census Bureau, the Plainsboro Center CDP has an area of 0.757 square miles (1.96 km^{2}), including 0.735 square miles (1.90 km^{2}) of land and 0.022 square miles (0.057 km^{2}) of water (2.91%). Plainsboro Pond on Cranbury Brook forms the southern edge of the CDP, and Devils Brook passes just north of the community. Both brooks are west-flowing tributaries of the Millstone River and thus part of the Raritan River watershed.

== Demographics ==
Historical population
Census	Pop.	Note	%±
2000	2,209		—
2010	2,712		22.8%
2020	2,760		1.8%
Population sources: 1950 1960 1970; 1980 1990 2000; 2010 2020

Plainsboro Center first appeared as a census designated place in the 2000 U.S. census.

=== Racial and ethnic composition ===
Plainsboro Center CDP, New Jersey – Racial and ethnic composition Note: the US Census treats Hispanic/Latino as an ethnic category. This table excludes Latinos from the racial categories and assigns them to a separate category. Hispanics/Latinos may be of any race.
Race / Ethnicity (NH = Non-Hispanic)	Pop 2000	Pop 2010	Pop 2020	% 2000	% 2010	% 2020
White alone (NH)	1,111	1,066	967	50.29%	39.31%	35.04%
Black or African American alone (NH)	101	125	84	4.57%	4.61%	3.04%
Native American or Alaska Native alone (NH)	1	9	7	0.05%	0.33%	0.25%
Asian alone (NH)	859	1,312	1,421	38.89%	48.38%	51.49%
Native Hawaiian or Pacific Islander alone (NH)	0	1	0	0.00%	0.04%	0.00%
Other race alone (NH)	4	9	15	0.18%	0.33%	0.54%
Mixed race or Multiracial (NH)	40	52	75	1.81%	1.92%	2.72%
Hispanic or Latino (any race)	93	138	191	4.21%	5.09%	6.92%
Total	2,209	2,712	2,760	100.00%	100.00%	100.00%

=== 2020 census ===
As of the 2020 census, Plainsboro Center had a population of 2,760. The median age was 35.4 years. 20.4% of residents were under the age of 18 and 13.2% of residents were 65 years of age or older. For every 100 females there were 96.0 males, and for every 100 females age 18 and over there were 92.1 males age 18 and over.

100.0% of residents lived in urban areas, while 0.0% lived in rural areas.

There were 1,250 households in Plainsboro Center, of which 26.6% had children under the age of 18 living in them. Of all households, 48.7% were married-couple households, 19.6% were households with a male householder and no spouse or partner present, and 24.8% were households with a female householder and no spouse or partner present. About 36.2% of all households were made up of individuals and 6.1% had someone living alone who was 65 years of age or older.

There were 1,325 housing units, of which 5.7% were vacant. The homeowner vacancy rate was 0.2% and the rental vacancy rate was 6.2%.

=== 2010 census ===
The 2010 United States census counted 2,712 people, 1,192 households, and 735 families in the CDP. The population density was 3,572.0 people per square mile (1,379.2 people/km^{2}). There were 1,311 housing units at an average density of 1,726.7 units per square mile (666.7 units/km^{2}). The racial makeup was 42.74% (1,159) White, 4.87% (132) Black or African American, 0.44% (12) Native American, 48.53% (1,316) Asian, 0.04% (1) Pacific Islander, 1.07% (29) from other races, and 2.32% (63) from two or more races. Hispanic or Latino of any race were 5.09% (138) of the population.

Of the 1,192 households, 32.6% had children under the age of 18; 53.7% were married couples living together; 5.8% had a female householder with no husband present and 38.3% were non-families. Of all households, 33.9% were made up of individuals and 5.0% had someone living alone who was 65 years of age or older. The average household size was 2.28 and the average family size was 2.97.

23.0% of the population were under the age of 18, 5.1% from 18 to 24, 41.0% from 25 to 44, 22.7% from 45 to 64, and 8.1% who were 65 years of age or older. The median age was 33.9 years. For every 100 females, the population had 96.9 males. For every 100 females ages 18 and older there were 95.8 males.

=== 2000 census ===
As of the 2000 United States census there were 2,209 people, 1,026 households, and 572 families living in the CDP. The population density was 1,273.0 people/km^{2} (3,297 people/mi^{2}). There were 1,089 housing units at an average density of 627.6 units/km^{2} (1,625 units/mi^{2}). The racial makeup of the CDP was 53.19% White, 4.75% African American, 0.05% Native American, 38.89% Asian, 0.95% from other races, and 2.17% from two or more races. Hispanic or Latino of any race were 4.21% of the population.

There were 1,026 households, out of which 29.1% had children under the age of 18 living with them, 48.8% were married couples living together, 5.2% had a female householder with no husband present, and 44.2% were non-families. 37.8% of all households were made up of individuals, and 1.8% had someone living alone who was 65 years of age or older. The average household size was 2.15 and the average family size was 2.90.

In the CDP the population was spread out, with 21.9% under the age of 18, 7.3% from 18 to 24, 51.1% from 25 to 44, 16.3% from 45 to 64, and 3.4% who were 65 years of age or older. The median age was 32 years. For every 100 females, there were 107.6 males. For every 100 females age 18 and over, there were 107.1 males.

The median income for a household in the CDP was $70,759, and the median income for a family was $81,201. Males had a median income of $70,110 versus $42,500 for females. The per capita income for the CDP was $36,555. About 4.8% of families and 3.8% of the population were below the poverty line, including 3.6% of those under age 18 and 35.8% of those age 65 or over.

== Nearby historic communities ==
- Blackwells Mills in Franklin Township (Somerset County)
- Blawenburg in Montgomery Township
- Clarksburg in Millstone Township
- Dayton in South Brunswick
- The Estate of Duke Farms in Hillsborough
- Dutch Neck in West Windsor Township
- Griggstown in Franklin Township (Somerset County)
- Harlingen in Montgomery Township
- Kingston in Franklin Township (Somerset County) and South Brunswick
- Lawrenceville in Lawrence Township (Mercer County)
- The Livingston Avenue Historic District in New Brunswick
- Marlboro in Marlboro Township, along with a detailed list of Historic Sites in Marlboro Township
- The Monmouth Battlefield Historic District in Freehold Township and Manalapan Township
- Monmouth Junction in South Brunswick
- Perrineville in Millstone Township
- The Princeton Battlefield Historic District in Princeton
- Princeton Junction in West Windsor Township
- The Road Up Raritan Historic District in Piscataway
- Tennent in Manalapan Township
- West Freehold in Freehold Township

...end hidden section -->
