= Plainsboro Township, New Jersey =

Township in Middlesex County, New Jersey, US

- Township
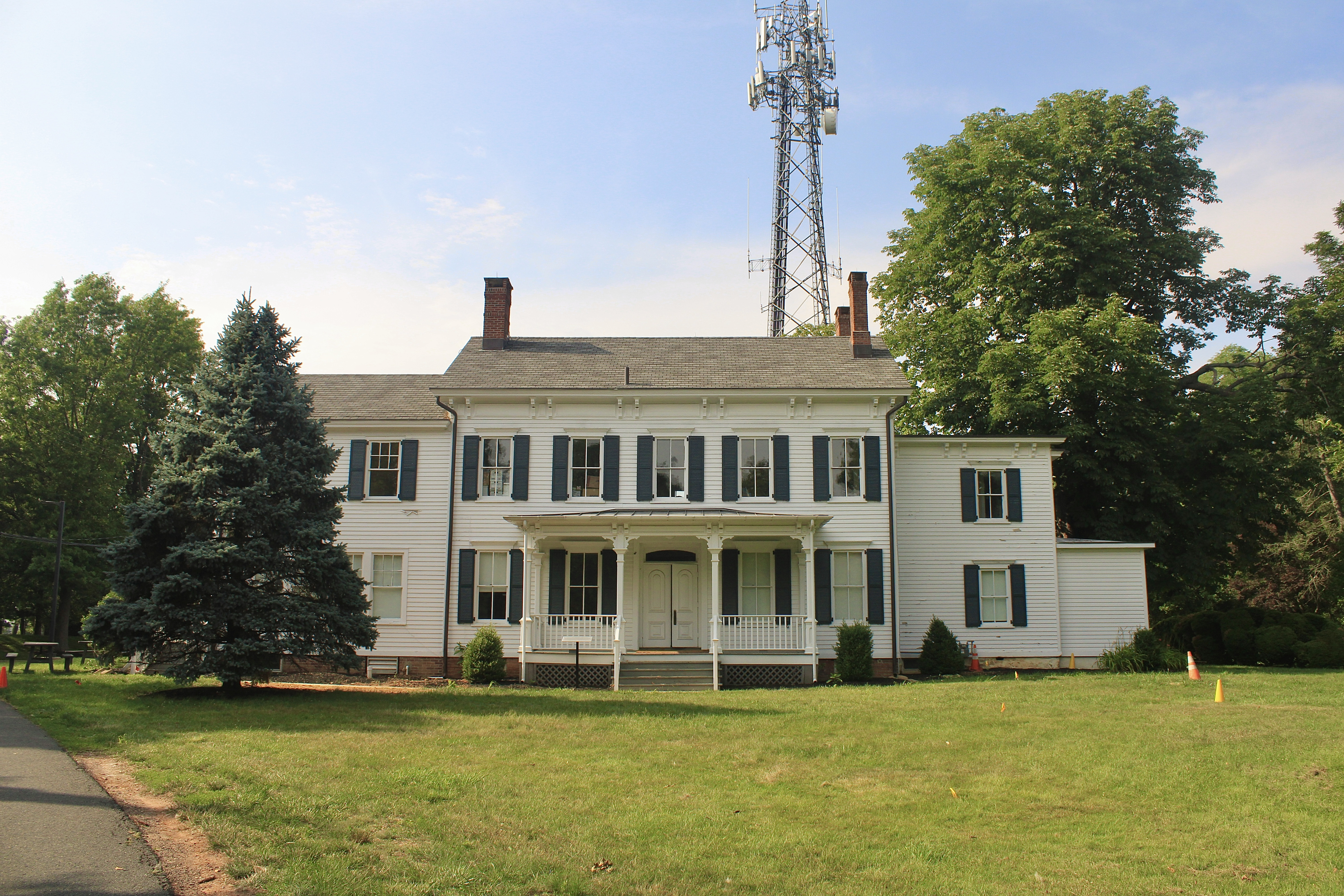
- John Van Buren Wicoff House

- logo

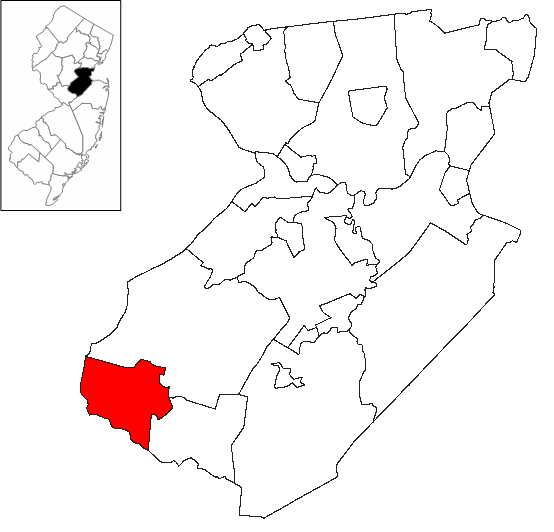
- Location of Plainsboro Township in Middlesex County highlighted in red (right). Inset map: Location of Middlesex County in New Jersey highlighted in black (left).

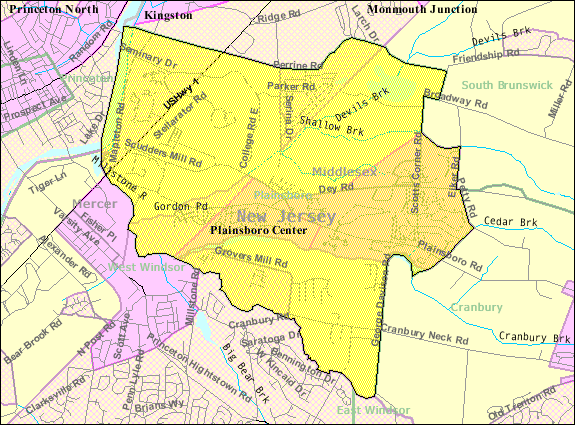
- Census Bureau map of Plainsboro Township, New Jersey

- Location in Middlesex County Location in New Jersey Location in the United States
- Coordinates: 40.335061°N 74.586326°W
- Country: United States
- State: New Jersey
- County: Middlesex
- Incorporated: May 6, 1919

Government
  - Type: Township
  - Body: Township Committee
  - Mayor: Ed Yates
  - Administrator: Anthony Cancro
  - Municipal clerk: Carol J. Torres

Area
  - Total: 12.11 sq mi (31.37 km^{2})
  - Land: 11.74 sq mi (30.40 km^{2})
  - Water: 0.37 sq mi (0.97 km^{2}) 3.09%
  - Rank: 191st of 565 in state 11th of 25 in county
- Elevation: 79 ft (24 m)

Population (2020)
  - Total: 24,084
  - Estimate (2023): 23,874
  - Rank: 110th of 565 in state 14th of 25 in county
  - Density: 2,051.8/sq mi (792.2/km^{2})
  - Rank: 292nd of 565 in state 21st of 25 in county
- Time zone: UTC−05:00 (Eastern (EST))
  - Summer (DST): UTC−04:00 (Eastern (EDT))
- ZIP Code: 08536
- Area code: 609
- FIPS code: 3402359280
- GNIS feature ID: 0882161
- Website: plainsboronj.com

Plainsboro Township is a township situated in southern Middlesex County, in the U.S. state of New Jersey. Centrally located in the Raritan Valley region, the township is an outer-ring suburb of New York City in the New York metropolitan area, even though it is slightly geographically closer to Center City, Philadelphia than to Midtown Manhattan. As of the 2020 United States census, the township's population was 24,084, its highest decennial count ever and an increase of 1,085 (+4.7%) from the 22,999 recorded at the 2010 census, which in turn reflected an increase of 2,784 (+13.8%) from the 20,215 counted in the 2000 census.

Plainsboro was incorporated as a township on May 6, 1919, from lands north of Plainsboro Road and Dey Road that had been part of South Brunswick and lands south of Plainsboro Road and Dey Road that had been part of Cranbury. The main impetus towards the creation of the township was the lack of schools serving the area; a new school was constructed after the township was established, which still exists as J.V.B. Wicoff School, named for one of the individuals who led the effort to create Plainsboro.

== History ==
The original residents of Plainsboro were the Unami people, a subtribe of the Lenape Native Americans. In the 17th century, the Dutch settled the area for its agricultural properties.

The oldest developed section of Plainsboro is at the intersection of Dey and Plainsboro Roads. It is thought that the road was named after a Dutch-built tavern that sat at the intersection, called "The Planes Tavern", in the early 18th century or earlier. The building still stands and was featured on HGTV's If These Walls Could Talk along with the historic Plainsboro Inn building (circa 1790) that was built adjacent to "Planes Tavern" at Plainsboro Road and Dey Road.

In 1897, the Walker-Gordon Dairy Farm opened up, which, among many other things, contributed Elsie the Cow and The Walker Gordon Diner, which has since been closed. The site of the farm has been turned into a community of 350 single-family homes named Walker-Gordon Farm.

Other family farms arrived during the first three quarters of the 20th century, notably the Parker, Simonson, Stults, and Groendyke farms. The Parker Farm was eventually integrated into the Groendyke farm, and both became part of Walker-Gordon's Dairy Farm, which is now a housing development. The Simonson and Stults Farms still stand and operate in Plainsboro.

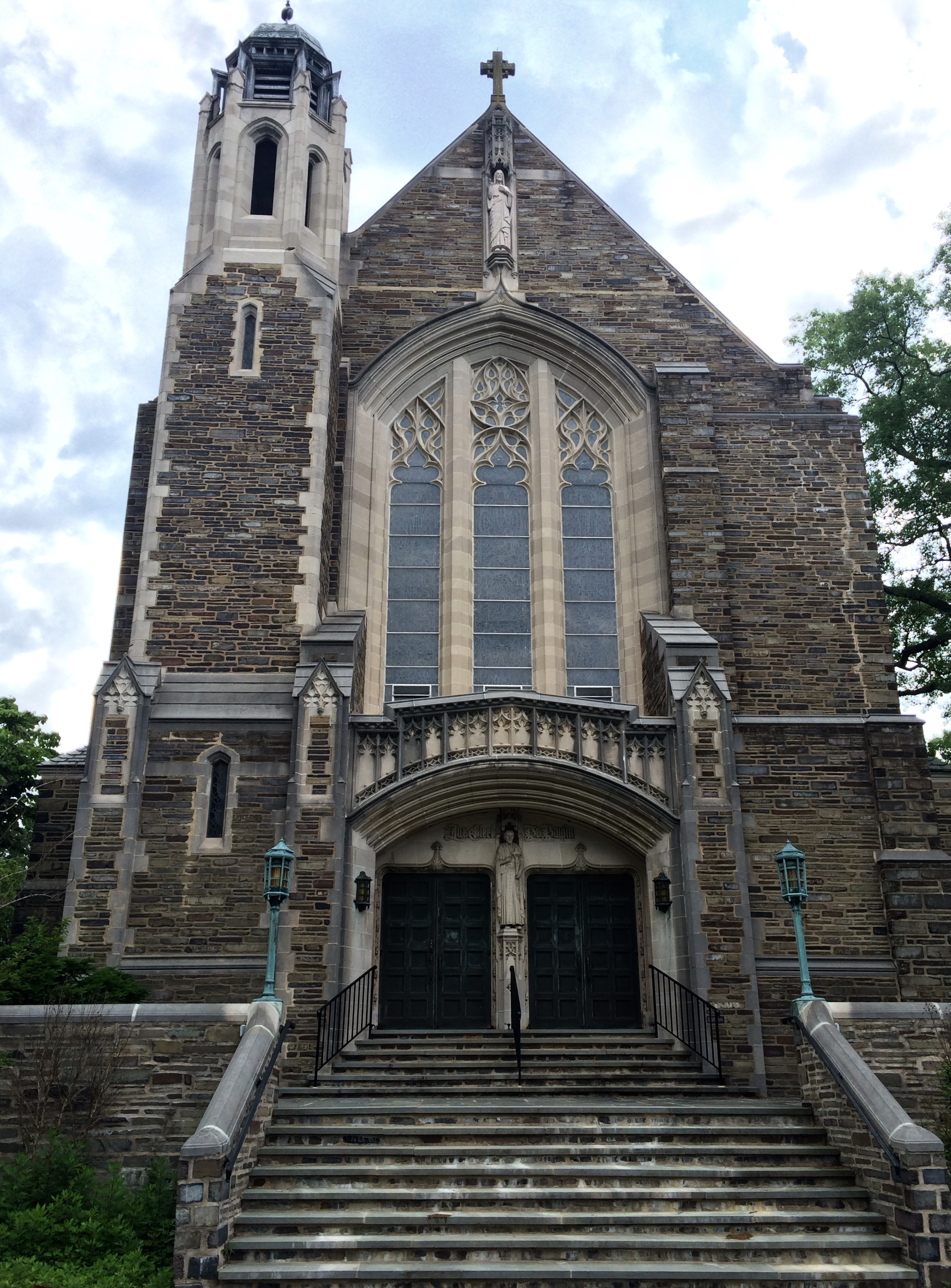
The chapel of St. Joseph's Seminary, built 1914 in Plainsboro, though it bears a Princeton address

Plainsboro was officially founded on May 6, 1919, and was formed from sections of Cranbury and South Brunswick townships. Plainsboro Township was created in response to Cranbury and South Brunswick refusing to build a new fireproof and larger school in Plainsboro Village. Every year, the date is celebrated with a parade, festival, and a concert.

In 1971, Princeton University (which owned most of the township) and Lincoln Properties, Inc., together started to develop the area into what it is now, a large suburban township still holding on to its rural past. By the 1980s, Princeton University had acquired nearly 5,000 acres (2,000 ha) of Plainsboro Township, a holding far larger than the 4.5 acres (1.8 ha) size of the original university campus. In response to the development, West Windsor-Plainsboro High School South was opened in nearby Princeton Junction, then just called WWP High. To accommodate the additional growth, West Windsor-Plainsboro High School North was opened in Plainsboro in September 2000, beginning a north–south rivalry between the Pirates and the Knights.

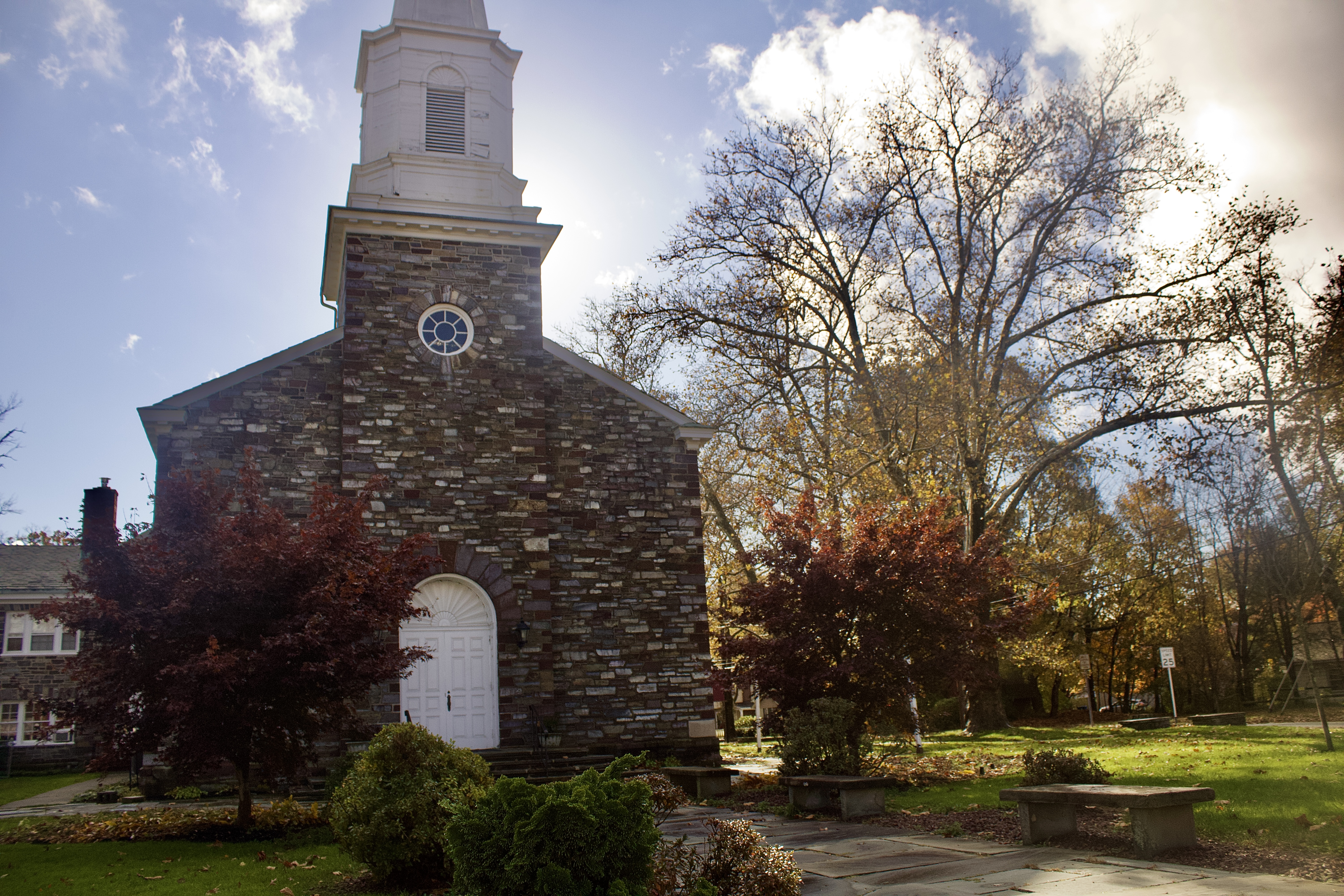
First Presbyterian Church (the current home of the Cornerstone Fellowship congregation) in the historic village of Plainsboro Center

The latest addition to Plainsboro is the Village Center, which is adjacent to the historic village area. Located at the intersection of Schalks Crossing and Scudder Mills Roads, Plainsboro Village Center currently features eight buildings totaling almost 75,000 square feet (7,000 m^{2}) of retail, commercial and office space, as well as 11 single-family homes and 12 townhomes. The Village Center contains wide landscaped sidewalks and outdoor, cafe'-style seating. The Village center's downtown atmosphere is the location of many shopping and dining destinations. The Village Center features a large village green with a tranquil fountain and walking paths in a park-like setting. The Village Center also houses a new $12.4 million Plainsboro Library, which opened on April 10, 2010. The township broke ground on July 27, for two new buildings that will host medical offices, additional retail space and eight residential condominium units.

A new hospital facility was under development in Plainsboro, that would be renamed University Medical Center of Princeton at Plainsboro. The new hospital and 171-acre (69 ha) medical campus was designed to include a medical office building attached to the hospital, an education center, a health and fitness center, a nursing facility, a pediatric services facility and a 32-acre (13 ha) public park. Officials at the Children's Hospital of Philadelphia (CHOP) announced they will be opening a facility in Plainsboro on 13 acres (5.3 ha) of the new hospital campus. Constructed at a cost of $523 million, the new hospital opened in May 2012, with patients relocated from the former facility in Princeton that had been in use for 93 years. The hospital was acquired in January 2018 by University of Pennsylvania Health System and renamed as Penn Medicine Princeton Medical Center.

== Geography ==
According to the United States Census Bureau, the township had a total area of 12.11 square miles (31.37 km^{2}), including 11.74 square miles (30.40 km^{2}) of land and 0.37 square miles (0.97 km^{2}) of water (3.09%).

Plainsboro Center (with a 2020 Census population of 2,760) and Princeton Meadows (14,776) are unincorporated communities and census-designated places (CDPs) located within Plainsboro Township.

Other unincorporated communities, localities and place names located partially or completely within the township include Aqueduct, Schalks and Scotts Corner.

The township borders the municipalities of Cranbury and South Brunswick in Middlesex County; and East Windsor, Princeton and West Windsor in Mercer County.

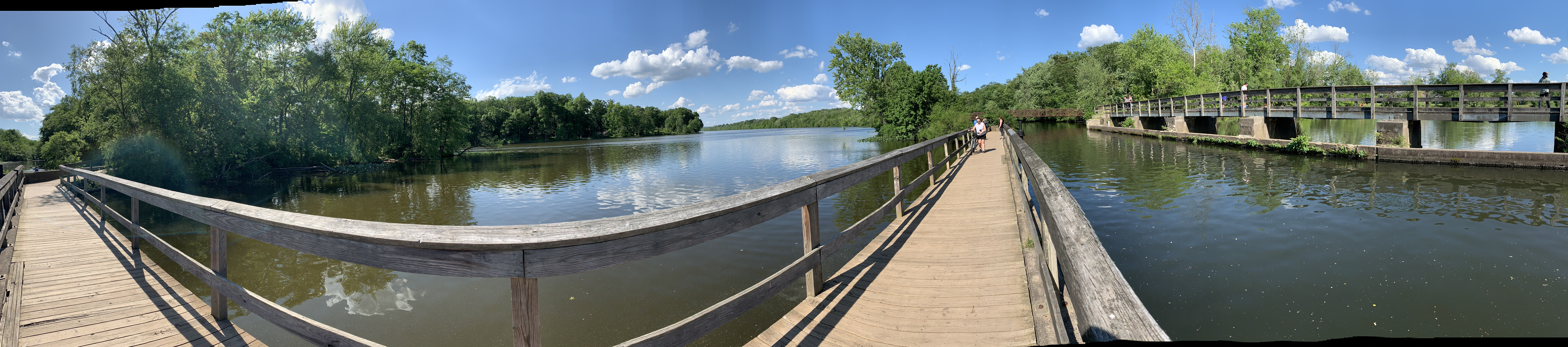
The Millstone River as it enters into the D&R Canal, on the border of Plainsboro and West Windsor

== Demographics ==
Historical population
Census	Pop.	Note	%±
1920	460		—
1930	1,018		121.3%
1940	925		−9.1%
1950	1,112		20.2%
1960	1,171		5.3%
1970	1,648		40.7%
1980	5,605		240.1%
1990	14,213		153.6%
2000	20,215		42.2%
2010	22,999		13.8%
2020	24,084		4.7%
2023 (est.)	23,874		−0.9%
U.S. Decennial Census; 1920 1920–1930; 1940–2000 2000; 2010 2020

=== 2020 Census ===
The 2020 United States census counted a total population of 24,084 people within Plainsboro Township, and 9,960 total households in the township. The median age of a Plainsboro resident was 38.2, while 22.2% of the population were under the age of 18. The racial makeup of the town was 13,596 (56%) Asian, 6,974 (28.9%) White, 1,646 (6.8%) Black/African American, 1,449 (6%) Hispanic/Latino, 71 (0.29%) American Indian and Alaska Native, 9 (0.037%) Native Hawaiian and Other Pacific Islander, 1,222 (5.07%) Mixed Race, and 566 (2.3%) were some other race.

Of 9,960 households, 56.9% were married-couple family households, 20.5% were Female householder with no spouse present family households, and 18.2% were Male householder with no spouse present family households, with 4.6% being other means of living.

The Census Bureau's 2022 American Community Survey displays the median household income of the township was $120,971, with family households making $166,880 on average, with married/couple families making $173,910 on average, and nonfamily households making $84,755 on average.

=== 2010 Census ===
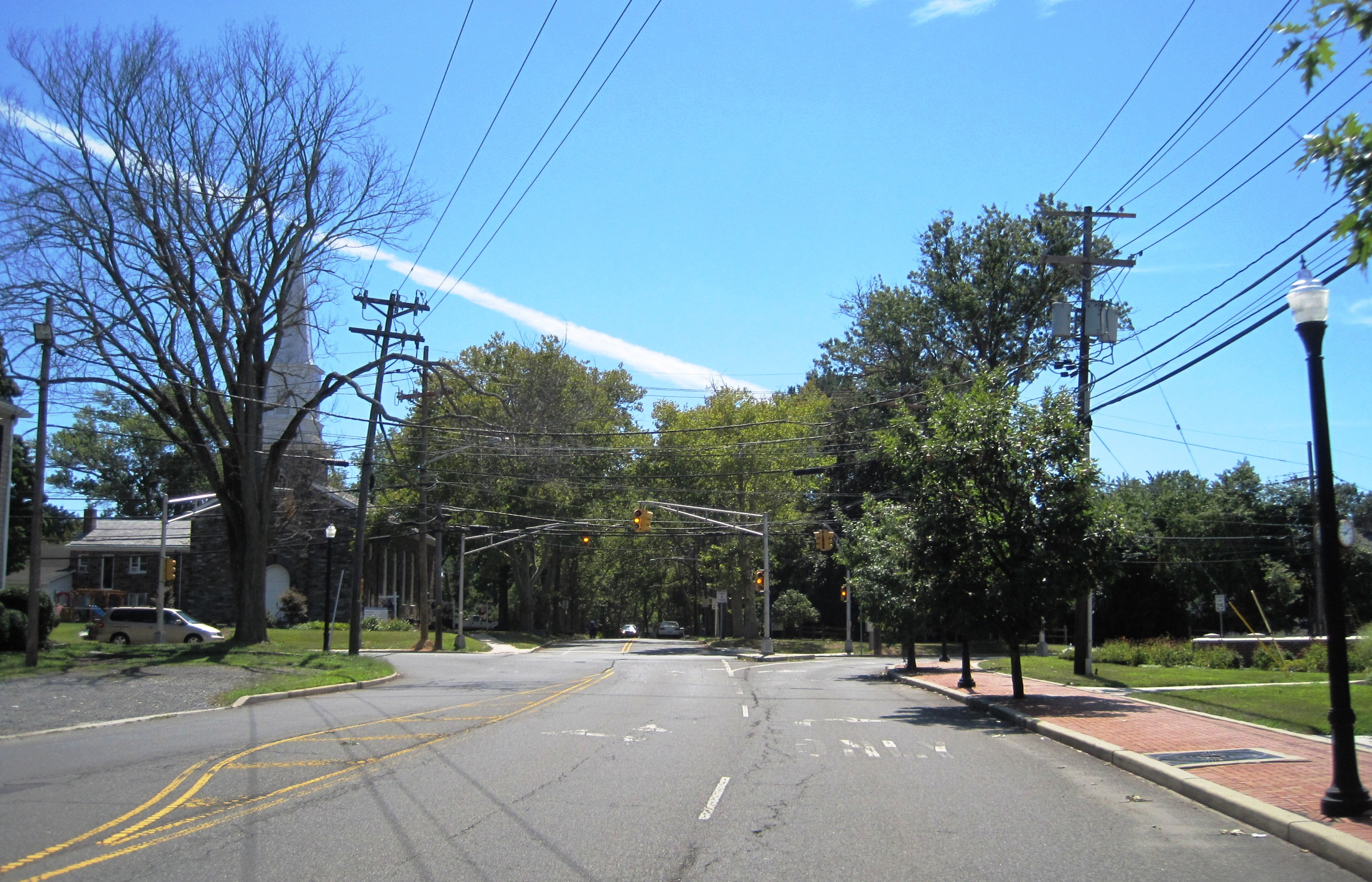
The Plainsboro Center neighborhood, located in the middle of the township

The 2010 United States census counted 22,999 people, 9,402 households, and 5,886 families in the township. The population density was 1,951.6 per square mile (753.5/km^{2}). There were 10,089 housing units at an average density of 856.1 per square mile (330.5/km^{2}). The racial makeup was 41.07% (9,445) White, 8.03% (1,847) Black or African American, 0.30% (69) Native American, 46.22% (10,630) Asian, 0.02% (4) Pacific Islander, 1.76% (404) from other races, and 2.61% (600) from two or more races. Hispanic or Latino of any race were 6.21% (1,429) of the population. As of the 2010 Census, 29.6% of the township's population self-identified as being Indian American, making them the largest minority group in the township.

Of the 9,402 households, 36.5% had children under the age of 18; 53.4% were married couples living together; 7.0% had a female householder with no husband present and 37.4% were non-families. Of all households, 31.2% were made up of individuals and 3.8% had someone living alone who was 65 years of age or older. The average household size was 2.43 and the average family size was 3.14.

24.7% of the population were under the age of 18, 6.0% from 18 to 24, 35.7% from 25 to 44, 26.2% from 45 to 64, and 7.5% who were 65 years of age or older. The median age was 35.5 years. For every 100 females, the population had 98.8 males. For every 100 females ages 18 and older there were 96.4 males.

The Census Bureau's 2006–2010 American Community Survey showed that (in 2010 inflation-adjusted dollars) median household income was $86,986 (with a margin of error of +/− $5,536) and the median family income was $114,457 (+/− $6.162). Males had a median income of $76,846 (+/− $6,185) versus $58,515 (+/− $5,722) for females. The per capita income for the township was $46,222 (+/− $2,054). About 1.9% of families and 3.9% of the population were below the poverty line, including 3.6% of those under age 18 and 4.0% of those age 65 or over.

=== 2000 Census ===
As of the 2000 United States census there were 20,215 people, 8,742 households, and 5,122 families residing in the township. The population density was 1,707.7 inhabitants per square mile (659.3/km^{2}). There were 9,133 housing units at an average density of 771.5 per square mile (297.9/km^{2}). The racial makeup of the township was 58.20% White, 7.58% African American, 0.10% Native American, 30.51% Asian, 0.01% Pacific Islander, 1.36% from other races, and 2.24% from two or more races. Hispanic or Latino of any race were 4.64% of the population.

As part of the 2000 Census, 16.97% of Plainsboro Township residents identified themselves as being Indian American. This was the second-highest percentage (behind Edison) of Indian American people in any municipality in the United States with 1,000 or more residents identifying their ancestry. In the 2000 census, 8.55% of Plainsboro Township's residents identified themselves as being of Chinese ancestry. This was the second-highest percentage (behind Holmdel Township) of people with Chinese ancestry in any municipality in New Jersey with 1,000 or more residents identifying their ancestry.

There were 8,742 households, out of which 33.4% had children under the age of 18 living with them, 50.4% were married couples living together, 6.4% had a female householder with no husband present, and 41.4% were non-families. 33.9% of all households were made up of individuals, and 2.2% had someone living alone who was 65 years of age or older. The average household size was 2.30 and the average family size was 3.06.

In the township the population was spread out, with 24.6% under the age of 18, 6.5% from 18 to 24, 45.2% from 25 to 44, 19.4% from 45 to 64, and 4.2% who were 65 years of age or older. The median age was 33 years. For every 100 females, there were 102.4 males. For every 100 females age 18 and over, there were 100.8 males.

The median income for a household in the township was $72,097, and the median income for a family was $88,783 (these figures had risen to $82,609 and $102,586 respectively as of the 2007 American Community Survey estimate). Males had a median income of $62,327 versus $44,671 for females. The per capita income for the township was $38,982. About 1.4% of families and 3.0% of the population were below the poverty line, including 1.7% of those under age 18 and 2.3% of those age 65 or over.

== Economy ==
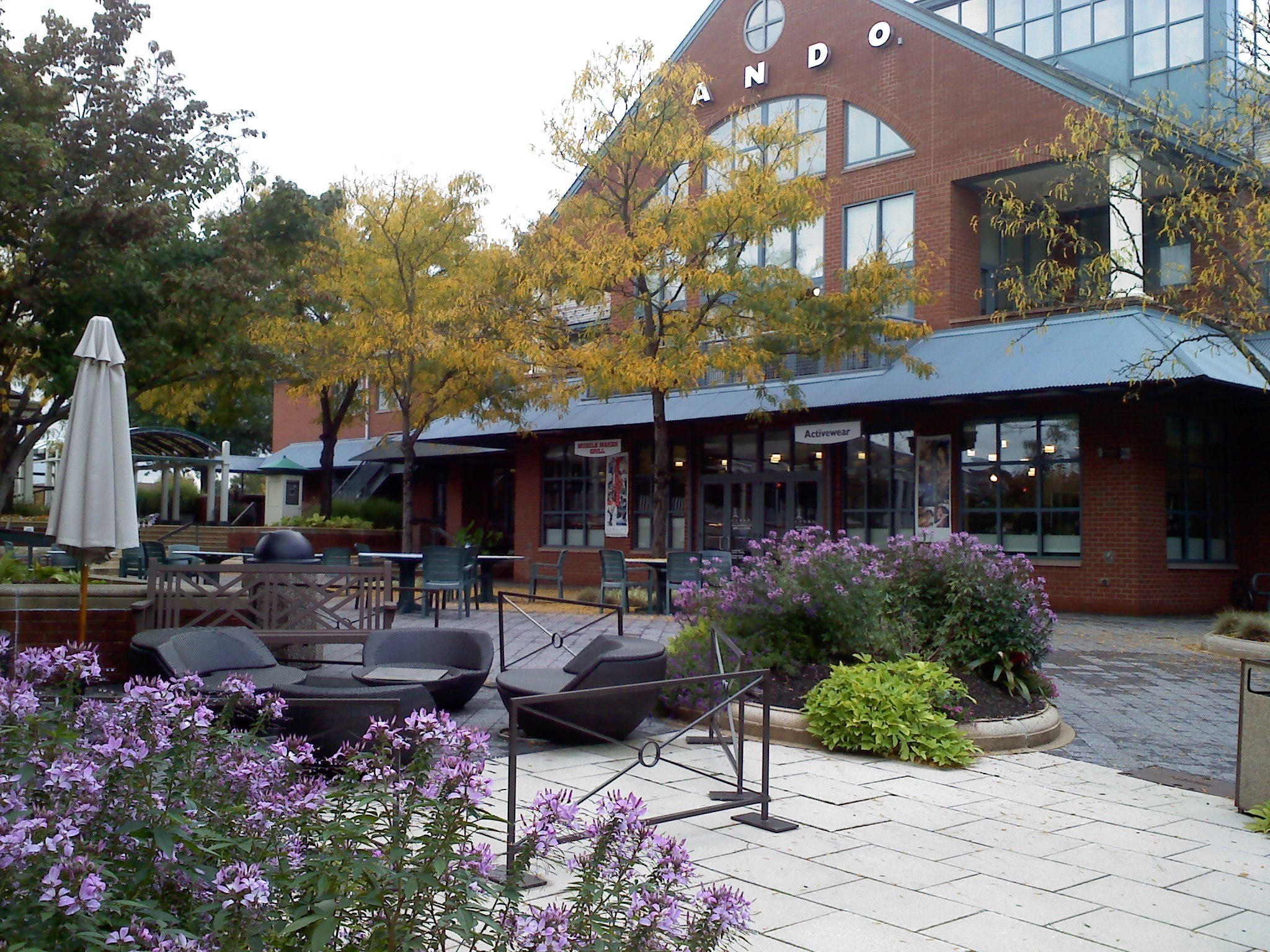
Courtyard in Forrestal Village

Forrestal Village is an upscale mixed use lifestyle center located on U.S. Route 1. The center opened in 1986 and has a gross leasable area of 720,000-square-foot (67,000 m^{2}), 52-acre (210,000 m^{2}) of retail and office space. It was designed by Sasaki Associates of Watertown, Massachusetts, with the architectural firm Bower Lewis Thrower/Architects to "create a retail mix that will not just bring people in every few weeks like the regional malls do".

As of 2022 its tenants are primarily smaller boutique retailers, offices, restaurants, and a hotel. The center has also been approved for residential units. MarketFair in Princeton and Quaker Bridge Mall in Lawrence Township are also a short distance away.

== Government ==
=== Local government ===
Old Town Logo

Plainsboro Township is governed by a Township Committee form of New Jersey municipal government. The township is one of 141 municipalities (of the 564) statewide governed under this form. The governing body is comprised of a five-member Township Committee whose members are chosen at-large on a partisan basis for three-year terms of office on a staggered basis, with either one or two seats up for vote each year as part of the November general election. Every January 1, the Township Committee re-organizes and selects a mayor and deputy mayor from among its membership. Township Committee meetings are open to the public and held on the second and fourth Wednesday of each month. A Township Administrator appointed by the Township Committee oversees Plainsboro's professional employees. Major departments are Administration, Township Clerk, Finance, Recreation/Cultural Affairs, Municipal Court, Public Safety, Public Works, Planning/Zoning, and Building Inspections, each overseen by a department head.

As of 2024, members of the Plainsboro Township Committee are Mayor Peter A. Cantu (D, term on committee ends December 31, 2026; terms as mayor ends 2024), Deputy Mayor Edward Yates (D, term on committee ends 2025; term as deputy mayor ends 2024), David Bander (D, 2025), Neil J. Lewis (D, 2024) and Nuran Nabi (D, 2024).

=== Federal, state and county representation ===
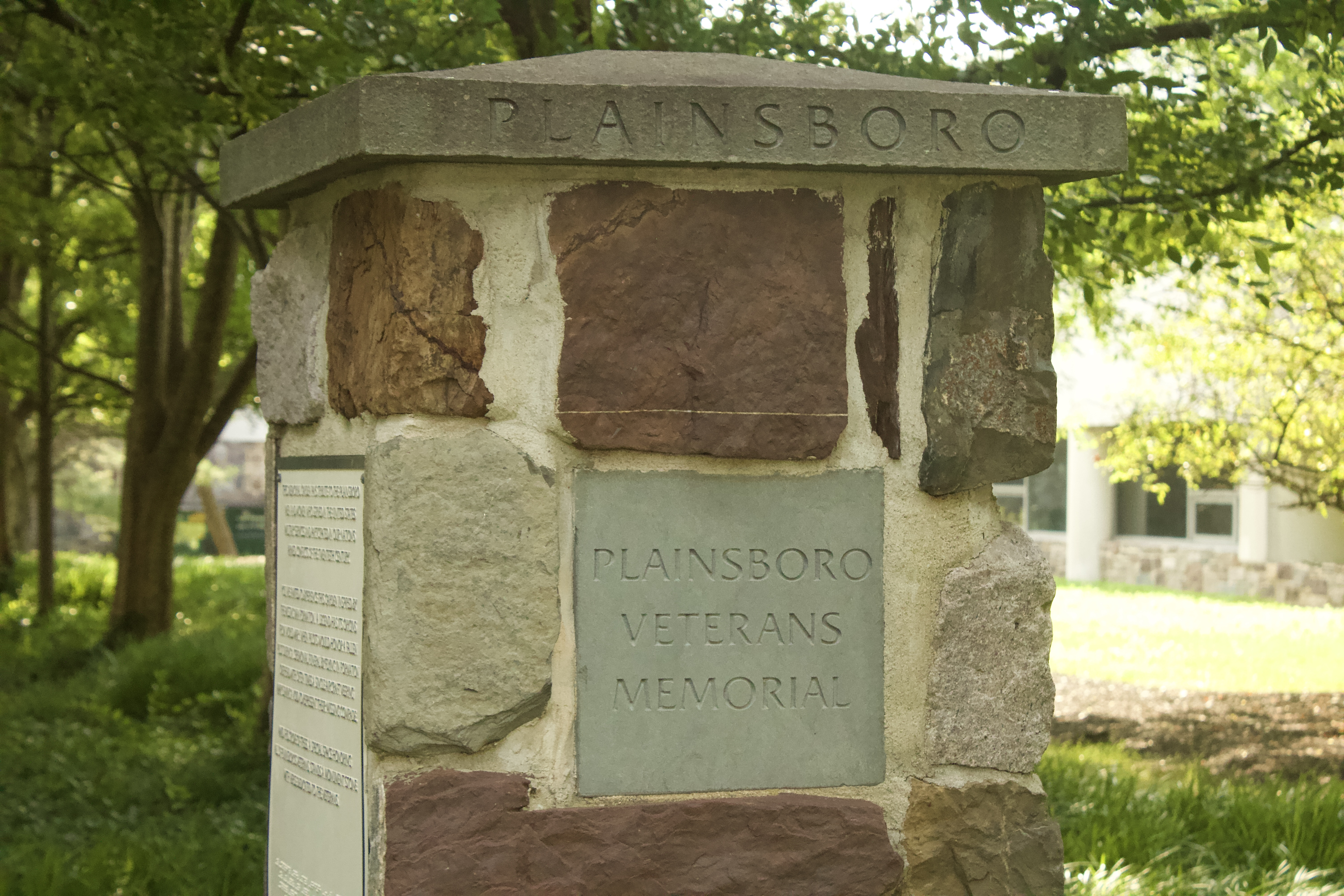

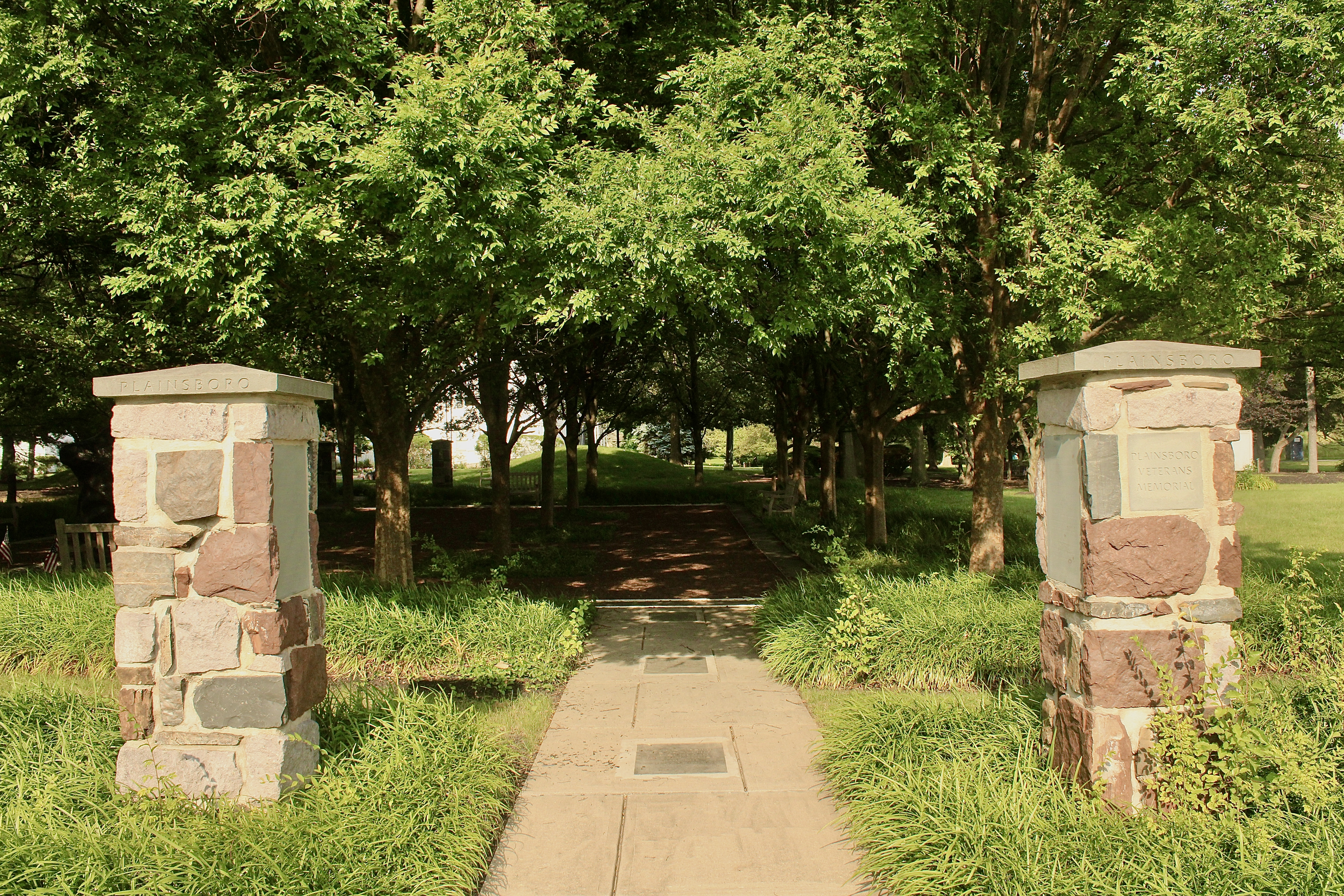
Plainsboro Veterans and 9/11 Memorial, built to honor U.S. service veterans and the four residents who lost their lives in the September 11 terrorist attacks. It is located on the Plainsboro Municipal Complex next to the Wicoff House.

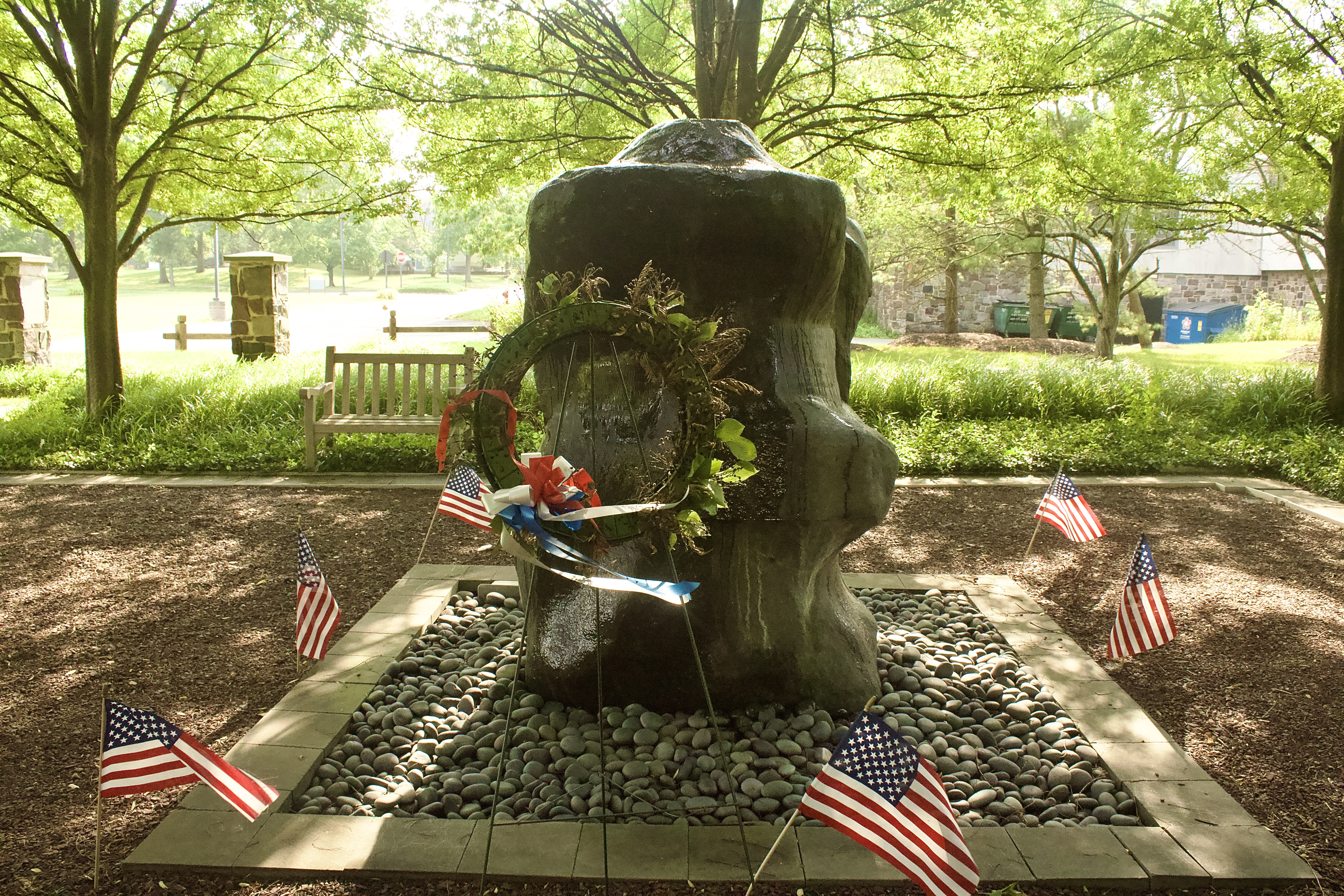

Plainsboro Township is located in the 12th Congressional District and is part of New Jersey's 14th state legislative district.

For the 119th United States Congress, New Jersey's 12th congressional district is represented by Bonnie Watson Coleman (D, Ewing Township). New Jersey is represented in the United States Senate by Democrats Cory Booker (Newark, term ends 2027) and Andy Kim (Moorestown, term ends 2031).

For the 2026–2027 session, the 14th legislative district of the New Jersey Legislature is represented in the State Senate by Linda R. Greenstein (D, Plainsboro Township) and in the General Assembly by Wayne DeAngelo (D, Hamilton Township) and Tennille McCoy (D, Hamilton Township).

Middlesex County is governed by a Board of County Commissioners, whose seven members are elected at-large on a partisan basis to serve three-year terms of office on a staggered basis, with either two or three seats coming up for election each year as part of the November general election. At an annual reorganization meeting held in January, the board selects from among its members a commissioner director and deputy director. As of 2025, Middlesex County's Commissioners (with party affiliation, term-end year, and residence listed in parentheses) are:

Director Ronald G. Rios (D, Carteret, 2027), Deputy Director Shanti Narra (D, North Brunswick, 2027), Claribel A. "Clary" Azcona-Barber (D, New Brunswick, 2025), Charles Kenny (D, Woodbridge Township, 2025), Leslie Koppel (D, Monroe Township, 2026), Chanelle Scott McCullum (D, Piscataway, 2025) and Charles E. Tomaro (D, Edison, 2026).

Constitutional officers are: Clerk Nancy Pinkin (D, 2025, East Brunswick), Sheriff Mildred S. Scott (D, 2025, Piscataway) and Surrogate Claribel Cortes (D, 2026; North Brunswick).

=== Politics ===
As of March 23, 2011, there were a total of 11,460 registered voters in Plainsboro Township, of which 3,884 (33.9%) were registered as Democrats, 1,486 (13.0%) were registered as Republicans and 6,081 (53.1%) were registered as Unaffiliated. There were 9 voters registered as Libertarians or Greens.

United States presidential election results for Plainsboro
Year	Republican		Democratic		Third party(ies)	
Year	No.	%	No.	%	No.	%
2024	2,438	27.16%	6,271	69.85%	269	3.00%
2020	2,152	22.83%	7,178	76.14%	97	1.03%
2016	1,800	22.45%	5,960	74.32%	259	3.23%
2012	2,286	29.26%	5,416	69.32%	111	1.42%
2008	2,280	28.05%	5,760	70.87%	87	1.07%
2004	2,575	35.56%	4,603	63.57%	63	0.87%
2000	2,359	36.11%	3,915	59.94%	258	3.95%

In the 2012 presidential election, Democrat Barack Obama received 69.3% of the vote (5,416 cast), ahead of Republican Mitt Romney with 29.3% (2,286 votes), and other candidates with 1.4% (111 votes), among the 7,859 ballots cast by the township's 12,074 registered voters (46 ballots were spoiled), for a turnout of 65.1%. In the 2008 presidential election, Democrat Barack Obama received 70.4% of the vote (5,760 cast), ahead of Republican John McCain with 27.8% (2,280 votes) and other candidates with 1.1% (87 votes), among the 8,187 ballots cast by the township's 11,847 registered voters, for a turnout of 69.1%. In the 2004 presidential election, Democrat John Kerry received 63.4% of the vote (4,603 ballots cast), outpolling Republican George W. Bush with 35.5% (2,575 votes) and other candidates with 0.6% (63 votes), among the 7,261 ballots cast by the township's 10,605 registered voters, for a turnout percentage of 68.5.

Gubernatorial election results for Plainsboro
Year	Republican		Democratic		Third party(ies)	
Year	No.	%	No.	%	No.	%
2025	1,503	22.23%	5,211	77.07%	47	0.70%
2021	1,239	25.35%	3,590	73.46%	58	1.19%
2017	1,239	29.40%	2,893	68.64%	83	1.97%
2013	2,232	54.93%	1,763	43.39%	68	1.67%
2009	1,823	39.11%	2,478	53.16%	360	7.72%
2005	1,737	38.31%	2,628	57.96%	169	3.73%

In the 2013 gubernatorial election, Republican Chris Christie received 54.9% of the vote (2,232 cast), ahead of Democrat Barbara Buono with 43.4% (1,763 votes), and other candidates with 1.7% (68 votes), among the 4,121 ballots cast by the township's 12,289 registered voters (58 ballots were spoiled), for a turnout of 33.5%. In the 2009 gubernatorial election, Democrat Jon Corzine received 58.7% of the vote (2,478 ballots cast), ahead of Republican Chris Christie with 43.2% (1,823 votes), Independent Chris Daggett with 7.3% (309 votes) and other candidates with 1.2% (51 votes), among the 4,223 ballots cast by the township's 11,142 registered voters, yielding a 37.9% turnout.

United States Senate election results for Plainsboro1
Year	Republican		Democratic		Third party(ies)	
Year	No.	%	No.	%	No.	%
2024	2,221	25.59%	6,164	71.02%	294	3.39%
2018	1,732	25.97%	4,700	70.48%	237	3.55%
2012	2,142	28.84%	5,106	68.74%	180	2.42%
2006	1,471	33.79%	2,772	63.68%	110	2.53%

United States Senate election results for Plainsboro2
Year	Republican		Democratic		Third party(ies)	
Year	No.	%	No.	%	No.	%
2020	2,266	24.39%	6,866	73.90%	159	1.71%
2014	1,048	29.56%	2,410	67.98%	87	2.45%
2013	748	28.47%	1,841	70.08%	38	1.45%
2008	2,528	33.28%	4,884	64.29%	185	2.44%

== Education ==
=== Public schools ===
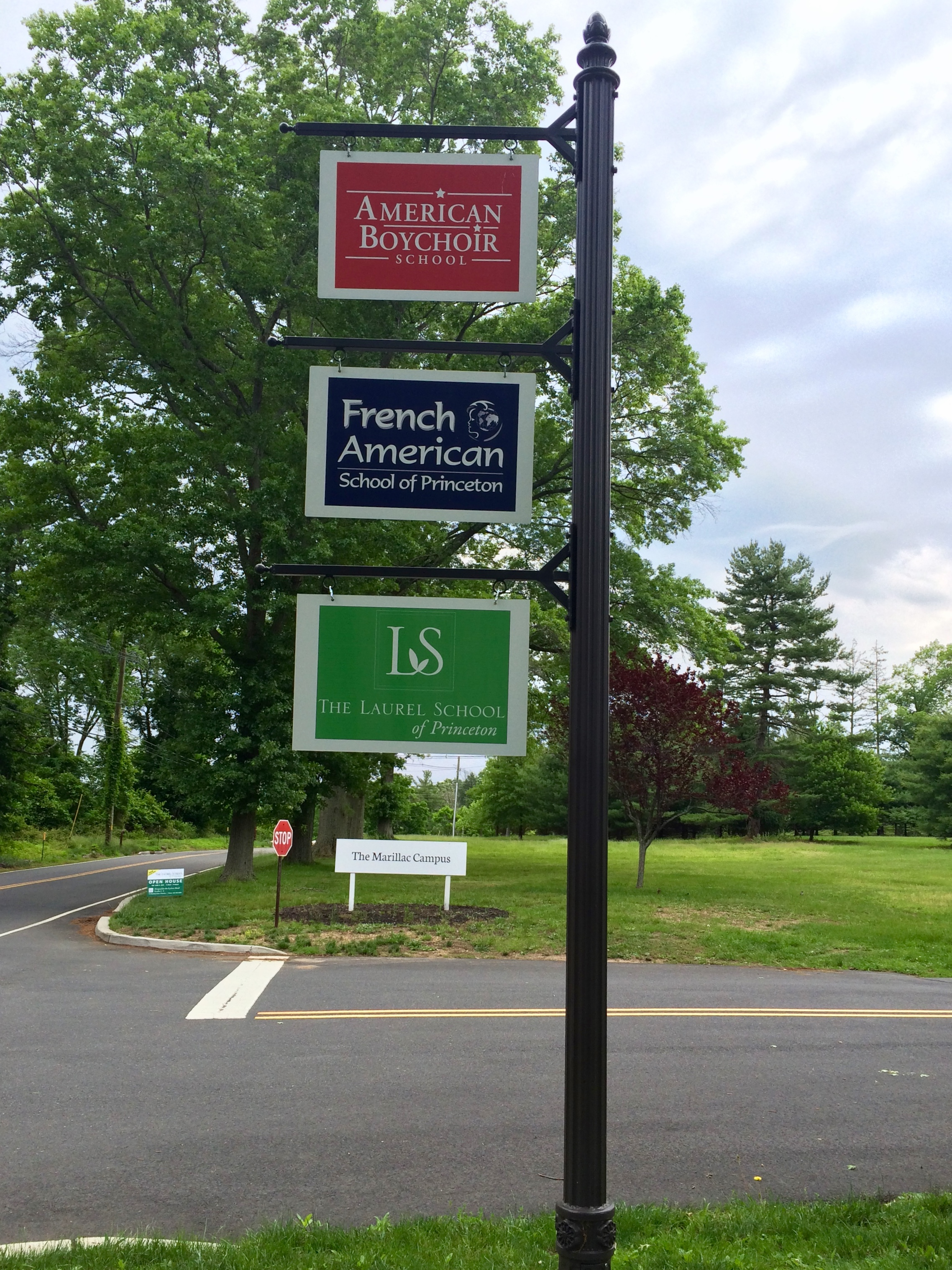
The campus of the former St. Joseph's Seminary is home to a number of private schools.

Plainsboro Township and West Windsor Township are part of a shared regional school district, which is known as the West Windsor-Plainsboro Regional School District, which serves students in pre-kindergarten through twelfth grade from the two communities. There are four elementary schools (grades PreK/K - 3), two upper elementary schools (grades 4 and 5), two middle schools (grades 6 - 8) and two high schools (grades 9 - 12). As of the 2024–25 school year, the district, comprised of 10 schools, had an enrollment of 8,900 students and 775.8 classroom teachers (on an FTE basis), for a student–teacher ratio of 11.5:1. Schools in the district (with 2024–25 enrollment data from the National Center for Education Statistics) are Dutch Neck Elementary School (located in West Windsor: 557 students; in grades K-3), Maurice Hawk Elementary School (West Windsor: 723; PreK-3), Town Center Elementary School (Plainsboro: 439; PreK-3), J.V.B. Wicoff Elementary School (Plainsboro: 334; K-3), Millstone River School (Plainsboro: 772; 3-5), Village School (West Windsor: 657; 4-5), Community Middle School (Plainsboro: 1,029; 6-8), Thomas R. Grover Middle School (West Windsor: 1,183; 6-8), West Windsor-Plainsboro High School North (Plainsboro: 1,510; 9-12) and West Windsor-Plainsboro High School South (West Windsor: 1,627; 9-12). The district is overseen by a directly elected nine-member board of education whose seats are allocated to the two constituent municipalities based on population, with four of the nine seats allocated to Plainsboro Township.

Eighth grade students from all of Middlesex County are eligible to apply to attend the high school programs offered by the Middlesex County Magnet Schools, a county-wide vocational school district that offers full-time career and technical education at its schools in East Brunswick, Edison, Perth Amboy, Piscataway and Woodbridge Township, with no tuition charged to students for attendance.

=== Private schools ===
The campus of the former St. Joseph's Seminary, located in Plainsboro, is home to a number of private schools.

- French American School of Princeton (Pre-K–8)
- The American Boychoir School (closed after 2017–2018 school year)
- The Laurel School
- Wilberforce School, a Classical Christian school. The school had been located in Plainsboro from 2011 to 2014 but permanently located in the former Saint Joseph's seminary in 2019.

== Historic district ==
Princeton Nurseries was a large commercial plant nursery in Plainsboro Township, near the historic village of Kingston, New Jersey. Founded in 1913 by William Flemer Sr., it once was the largest commercial nursery in the United States. The company stopped operations here in 1995. It was added to the National Register of Historic Places as the Princeton Nurseries Historic District on August 28, 2018.

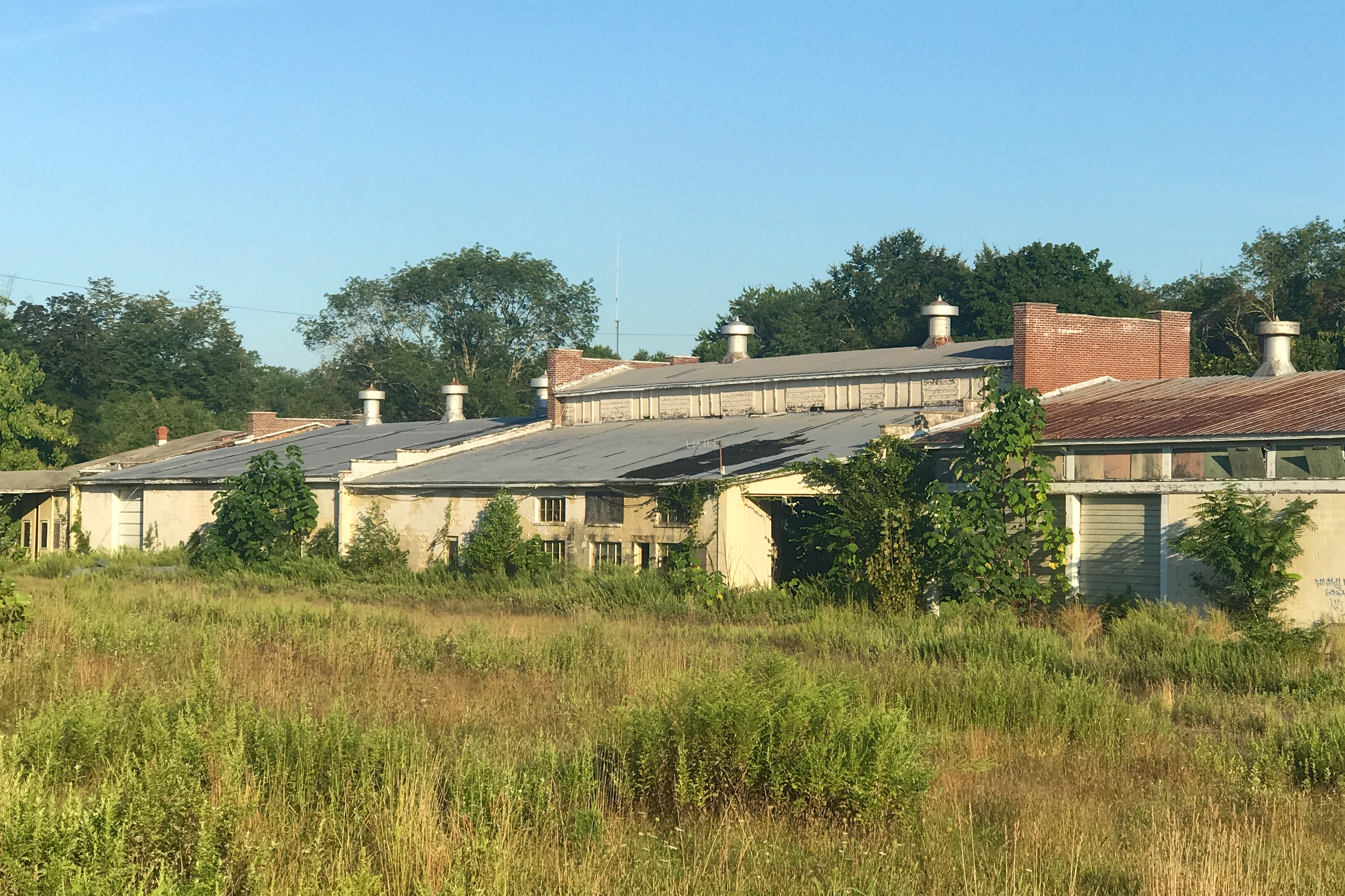
Storage Building

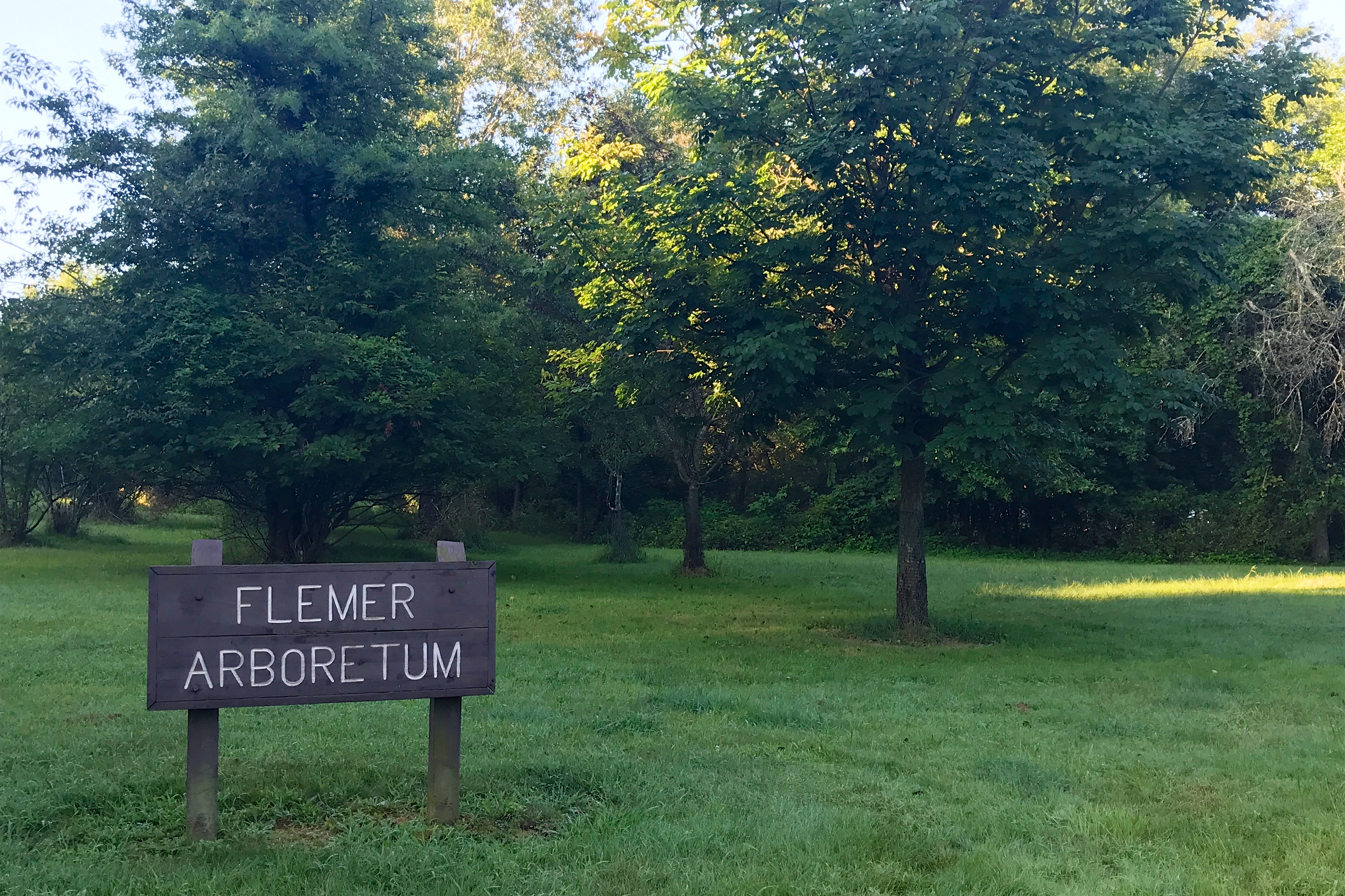
Flemer Arboretum

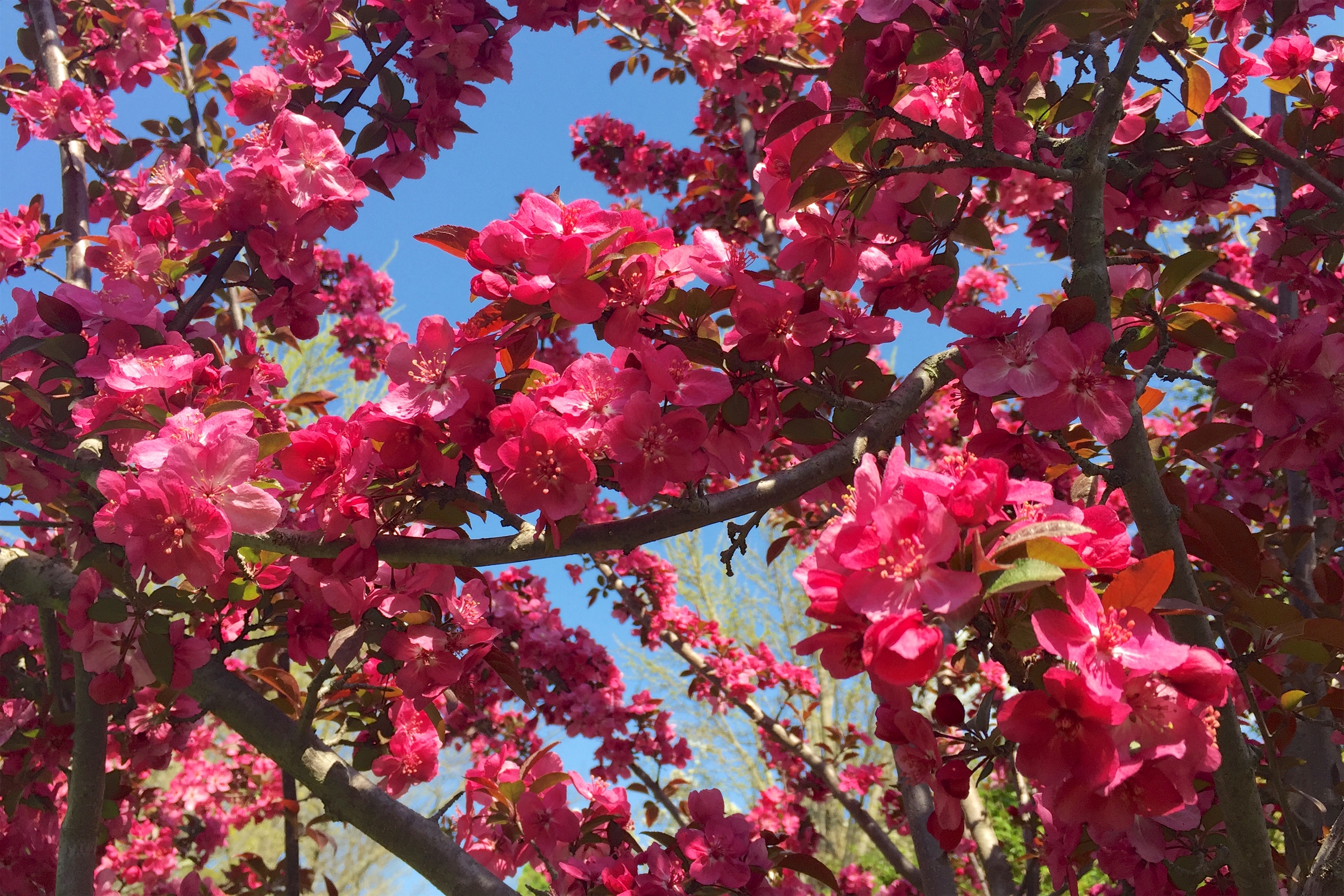
Flowering tree in the arboretum

== Infrastructure ==
=== Transportation ===
==== Roads and highways ====
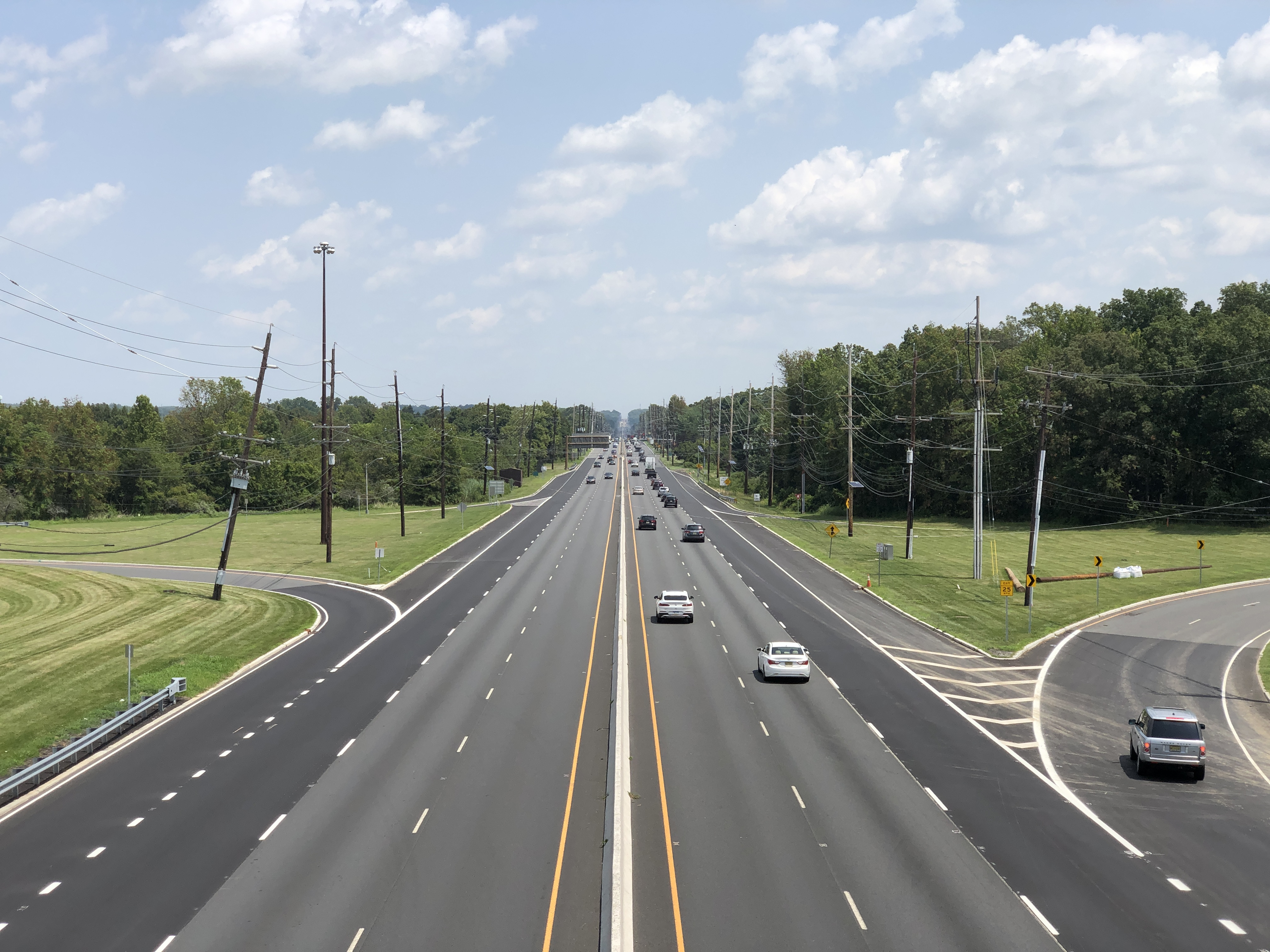
View north along U.S. Route 1 in Plainsboro

As of May 2010, the township had a total of 64.94 miles (104.51 km) of roadways, of which 55.78 miles (89.77 km) were maintained by the municipality, 7.06 miles (11.36 km) by Middlesex County and 2.10 miles (3.38 km) by the New Jersey Department of Transportation.

Several major transportation routes traverse the township. US 1 is a major transportation route that passes through the northwestern part of township. County Route 614 has its western terminus at US 1 and passes through the center of Plainsboro.

The closest limited access road is the New Jersey Turnpike (Interstate 95) which is accessible from Interchange 8 in neighboring East Windsor Township and Interchange 8A in Monroe Township.

==== Public transportation ====
New Jersey Transit bus service includes the 600, which provides service to Trenton. NJ Transit's Northeast Corridor rail line runs through the township. NJ Transit and Amtrak trains service the township at the nearby Princeton Junction.

Suburban Transit buses 300 line to New York from the Park and Ride in U.S. Route 130 provides service directly to Grand Central Terminal in Midtown Manhattan.

==== Cycling ====
There are many cycle routes through Plainsboro, connecting the main shopping districts and down to the D&R Canal cycle pathway. There are a few discontinuities in the cycle routes, but generally they are well-maintained.

=== Healthcare ===
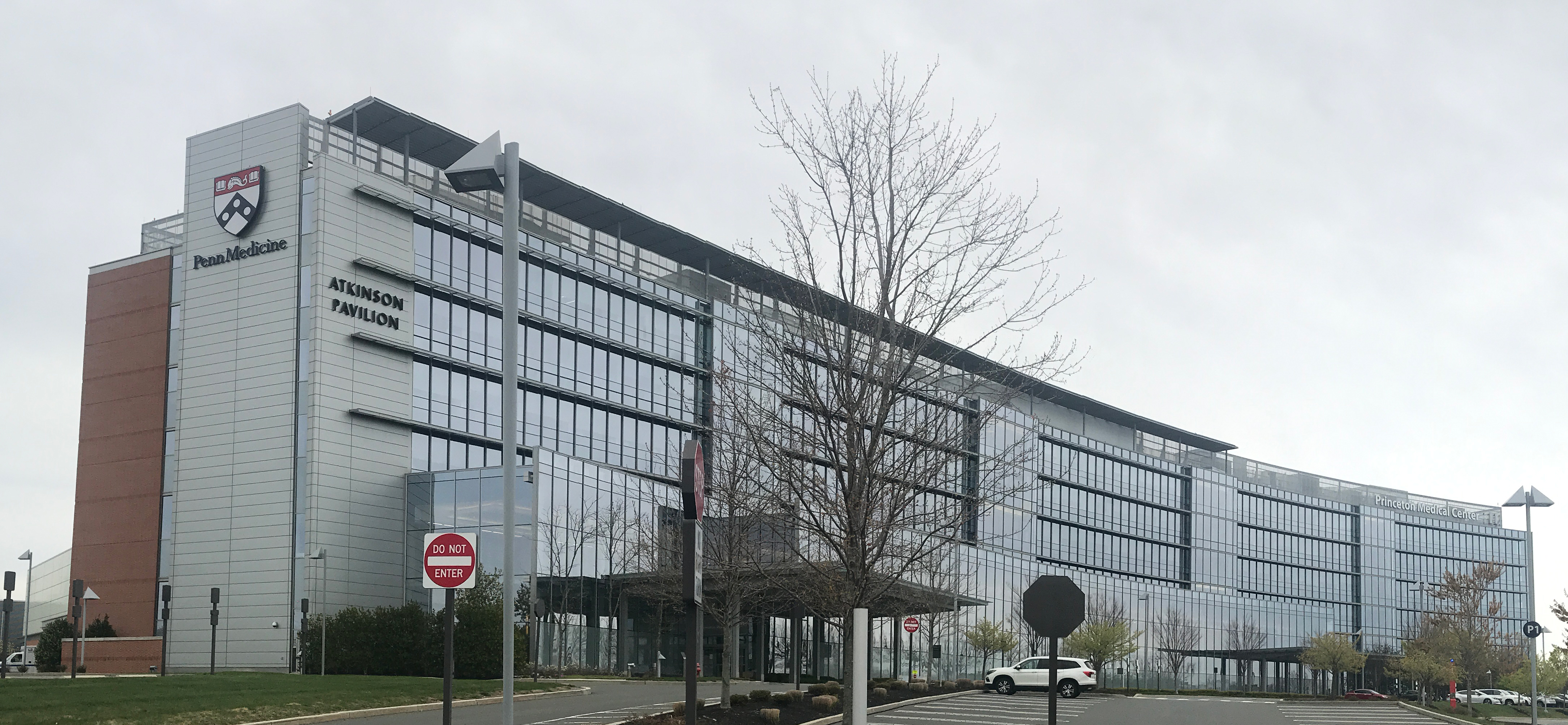
Penn Medicine Princeton Medical Center

Penn Medicine Princeton Medical Center (commonly abbreviated as "PMC") is a regional hospital and healthcare network located in Plainsboro Township. Servicing the greater Princeton region (which includes parts of Middlesex, Mercer, Monmouth, and Somerset counties) in central New Jersey, the hospital is owned by the Penn Medicine Health System and is the only such hospital in the state of New Jersey. PMC is a 355-bed non-profit, tertiary, and academic medical center. It is a major university hospital of the Robert Wood Johnson Medical School of Rutgers University and has a helipad to handle transport critical patients from and to other hospitals via PennStar. The hospital was previously located in Princeton on Witherspoon Street, until May 22, 2012, when the new location opened off of U.S.1. The new hospital was designed by a joint venture between HOK and RMJM Hiller. The PMC network offers a wide array of services at its main campus location in Plainsboro, along with its network of primary and specialty care through its Family-based Physician practice locations across Central Jersey (in locations such as in Cranbury, Dayton, East Windsor, Ewing, Hillsborough, Lawrenceville, Monroe, Morganville, Pennington, Robbinsville, and West Windsor).

Other nearby regional hospitals and healthcare networks that are accessible to the township include CentraState Medical Center in nearby Freehold Township, the Old Bridge Township division of Raritan Bay Medical Center, and the Hamilton Township division of Robert Wood Johnson University Hospital (RWJUH). Saint Peter's University Hospital and Robert Wood Johnson University Hospital are also located nearby in New Brunswick.

== Media appearances ==
- Plainsboro is the namesake of the fictional Princeton-Plainsboro Teaching Hospital in the Fox TV series House.
- Plainsboro is referred to in Tim Curry's song "Paradise Garage" from his album Fearless.
- Plainsboro and the fictional Plainsboro High School are the setting around which the HBO film Rocket Science is based.
- Plainsboro is mentioned in the description of the battle area in Orson Welles's 1938 radio broadcast, The War of the Worlds, when the radio announcer describes the aftermath of the purported Martian invasion at nearby Grover's Mill.
- Plainsboro was featured on the MTV series, True Life ("I'm Graduating from High School") season 11, 2008, on which MTV took a look at the life of three seniors who were enrolled at High School North.
- Plainsboro is the site for the tomb of Elsie the Cow.

== Science and research ==
- From 1986 through 1989, Plainsboro was home to the John von Neumann Center on College Road, which hosted the liquid nitrogen-cooled ETA10 supercomputer, then the world's fastest computer, and was a major hub of the early Internet.
- Plainsboro is home to the Princeton Plasma Physics Laboratory, a laboratory for plasma physics research.
- The National Oceanographic and Atmospheric Administration's Geophysical Fluid Dynamics Laboratory, where the first computer models of climate were developed, is physically located in Plainsboro on the James Forrestal Campus of Princeton University.
- Plainsboro had a nuclear research reactor (on Nuclear Reactor Road) built in 1957.
- In 1930, the Rotolactor was invented by Walker Gordon Farms in Plainsboro. The Rotolactor was the first rotary milking parlor and a popular tourist attraction. It remained in use into the 1960s.

== Notable people ==
People who were born in, residents of, or otherwise closely associated with Plainsboro Township include:

- David Jordan Bachner (1991–2009), baseball pitcher
- Andrew Bynum (born 1987), former professional basketball player
- Patrick Clark (1955–1998), chef
- Boris Epshteyn (born 1982), political strategist, investment banker and attorney
- Linda R. Greenstein (born 1950), represents the 14th Legislative District in the New Jersey State Senate
- Henry W. Jeffers (1871–1953), one of the leaders in establishing Plainsboro Township, and served as its first mayor after incorporation in 1919
- Gary Jeter (1955–2016), former NFL defensive end who played for the New York Giants, Los Angeles Rams and New England Patriots
- Mariam Nazarian (born 1983), concert pianist and producer, who made her Carnegie Hall debut at the age of 16
- Rebecca Soni (born 1987), U.S. Olympic swimmer and gold medal winner of the 200m breaststroke at the 2008 Summer Olympics in Beijing
- Barbara Wright (born 1933), member of the New Jersey General Assembly who also served as mayor of the township
- Felicia Zhang (born 1993), former pair skater who is a two-time U.S. national medalist and competed at the 2014 Winter Olympics
