= Penn Medicine Princeton Medical Center =

Princeton Medical Center
- Penn Medicine (Princeton Health)

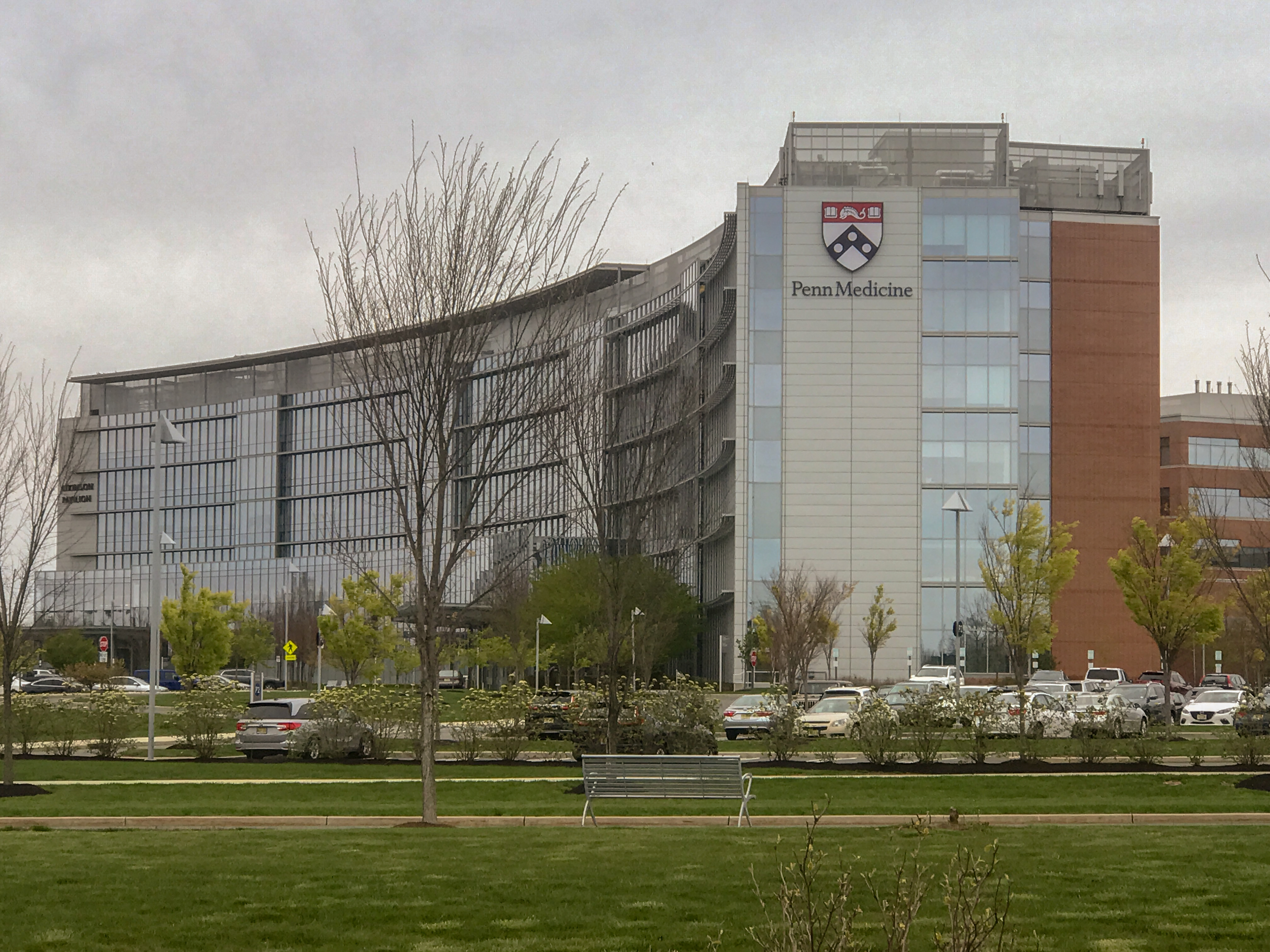
- A panorama of the Atkinson Pavilion of the Penn Medicine Princeton Medical Center in Plainsboro, New Jersey

Geography
- Location: 1 Plainsboro Road; Plainsboro, New Jersey 08536, United States
- Coordinates: 40.339111°N 74.623722°W

Organization
- Affiliated university: Robert Wood Johnson Medical School

Services
- Emergency department: Yes
- Beds: 355

Helipads
- Helipad: FAA LID: 45NJ

History
- Former name: University Medical Center of Princeton

Links
- Website: princetonhcs.org/our-locations/pmc
- Lists: Hospitals in the United States

Penn Medicine Princeton Medical Center (PMC), formerly known as the University Medical Center of Princeton at Plainsboro, is a 355-bed non-profit, tertiary, and academic medical center located in Plainsboro, New Jersey, servicing the Central Jersey area around Princeton. The hospital is owned by the Penn Medicine Health System and is their only such hospital in New Jersey. PMC is a major university hospital of the Robert Wood Johnson Medical School of Rutgers University and has a helipad to handle transport of critical patients from and to other hospitals via PennStar, the PennMed air ambulance system.

== History ==
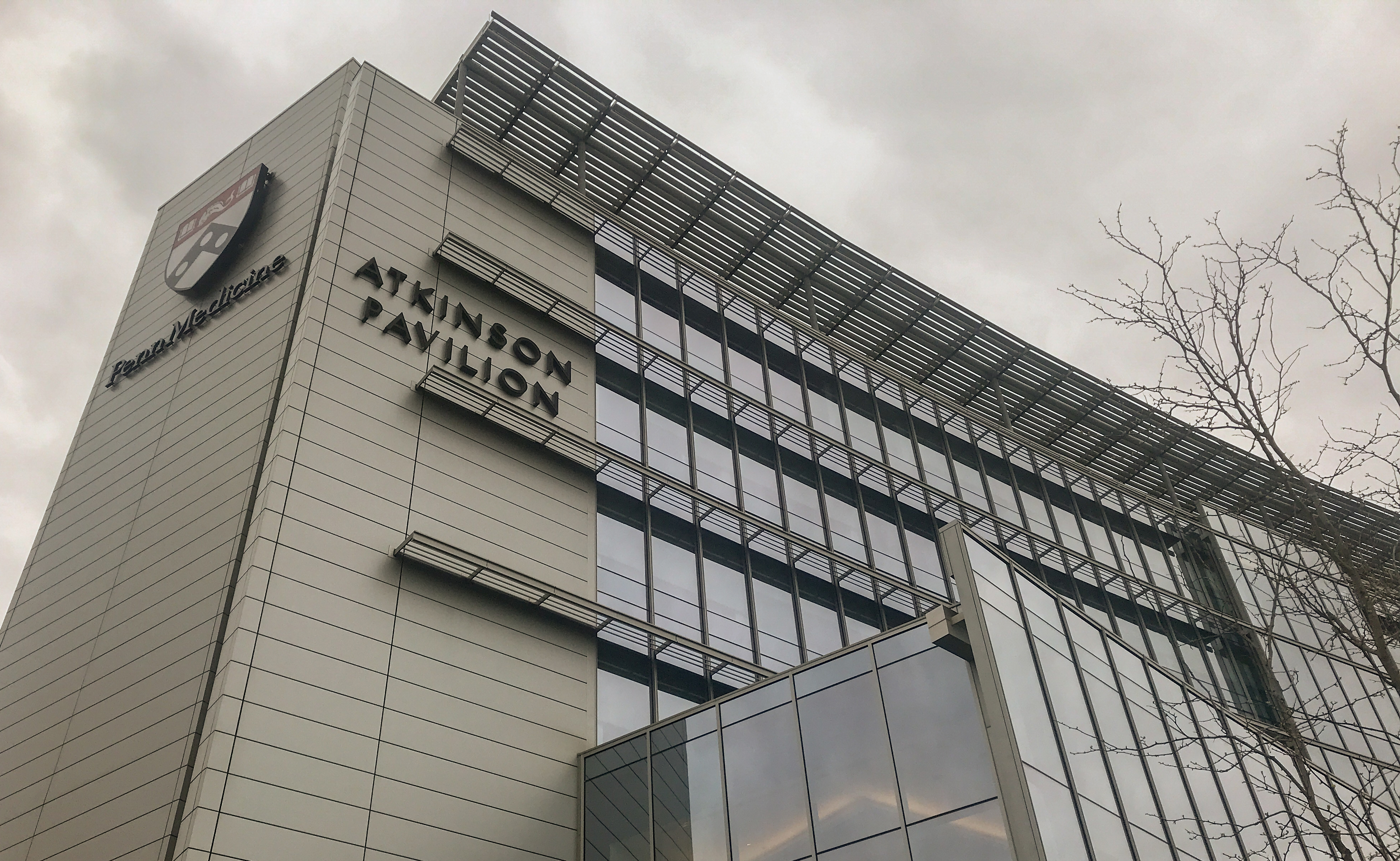
Atkinson Pavilion of the Penn Medicine Princeton Medical Center

The hospital was previously located in Princeton at 253 Witherspoon Street, until May 22, 2012, when the new location opened off of Route 1. The new hospital was designed by a joint venture between HOK and RMJM Hiller.

The hospital was a member of the Princeton HealthCare System, which was formally incorporated into the University of Pennsylvania Health System in January 2018. The addition of the Princeton HealthCare System will make it the sixth hospital in the University of Pennsylvania Health System, which will employ over 3,000 staff and more than 1,000 physicians.

Pediatric care to the hospital is provided by doctors from the Children's Hospital of Philadelphia on PMC's inpatient pediatric wards, pediatric emergency department, and pediatric specialty care center.

Adjacent to the medical center is the Children's Hospital of Philadelphia Specialty Center that treats infants, children, adolescents, and young adults up to the age of 21.

It has no relationship with the fictional Princeton-Plainsboro Teaching Hospital, which was the setting for the medical drama House M.D. from 2004 to 2012, even though they share a similar location and name.

The previous hospital on Witherspoon Street in Princeton was notable for being Albert Einstein's place of death.

The hospital implemented strict protocols to limit spread of illness during the COVID-19 pandemic in 2020, including limiting visitors to patients throughout its facilities.

In 2020–21, U.S. News & World Report ranked the hospital as the ninth-best in New Jersey, 24th-best in the New York City metropolitan area, and "high performing" in the specialty of orthopedics.

== Affiliations ==
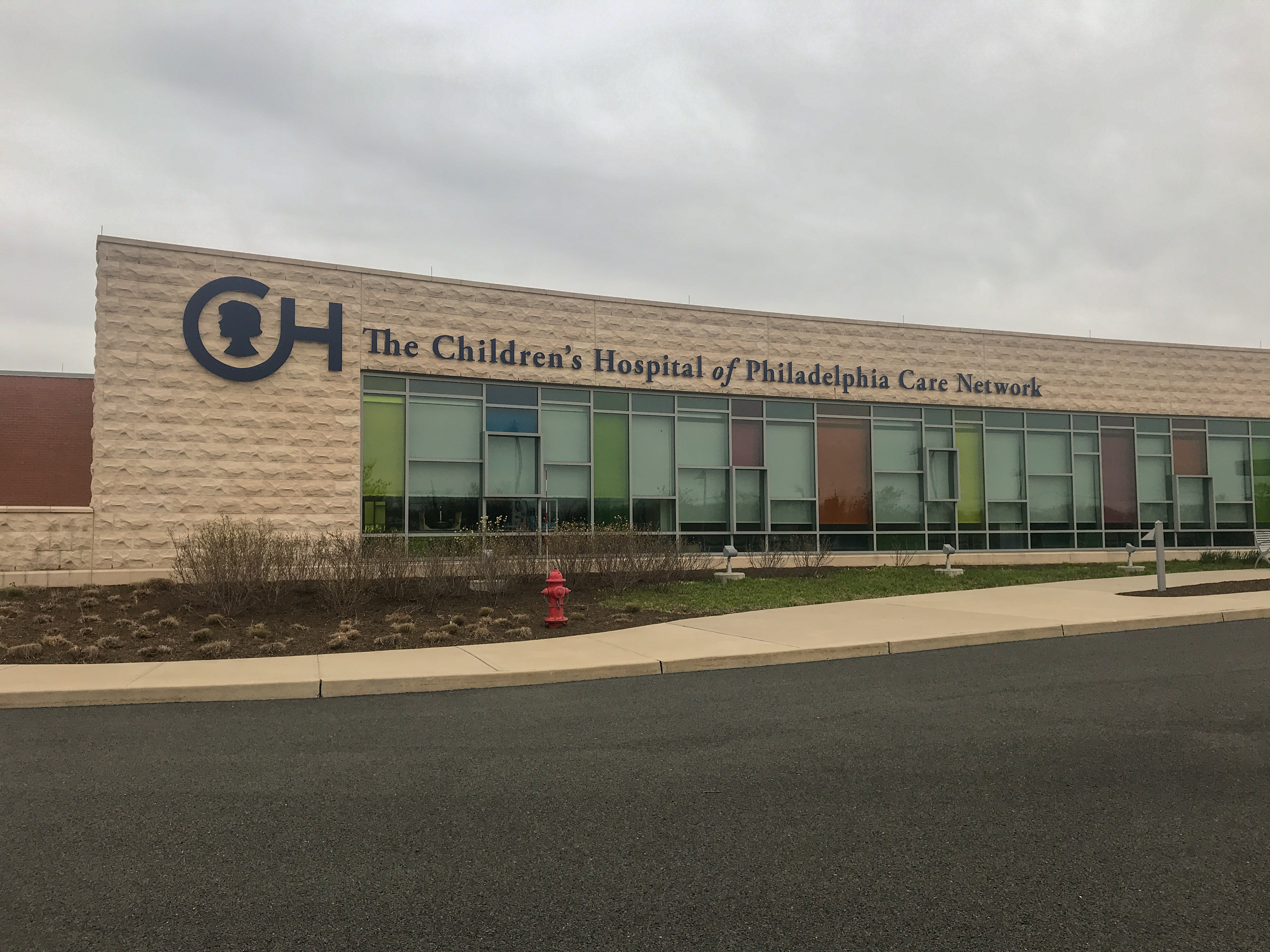
Children's Hospital of Philadelphia, a pediatric specialty center at Penn Medicine Princeton Medical Center

In addition to its affiliation with Penn Medicine, the hospital is affiliated with the Robert Wood Johnson Medical School and Children's Hospital of Philadelphia.

== See also ==
- Princeton University
- Robert Wood Johnson Medical School
- University of Pennsylvania
