= Lawrence Township, Mercer County, New Jersey =

Township in Mercer County, New Jersey, US

Lawrence Township, New Jersey
- Township
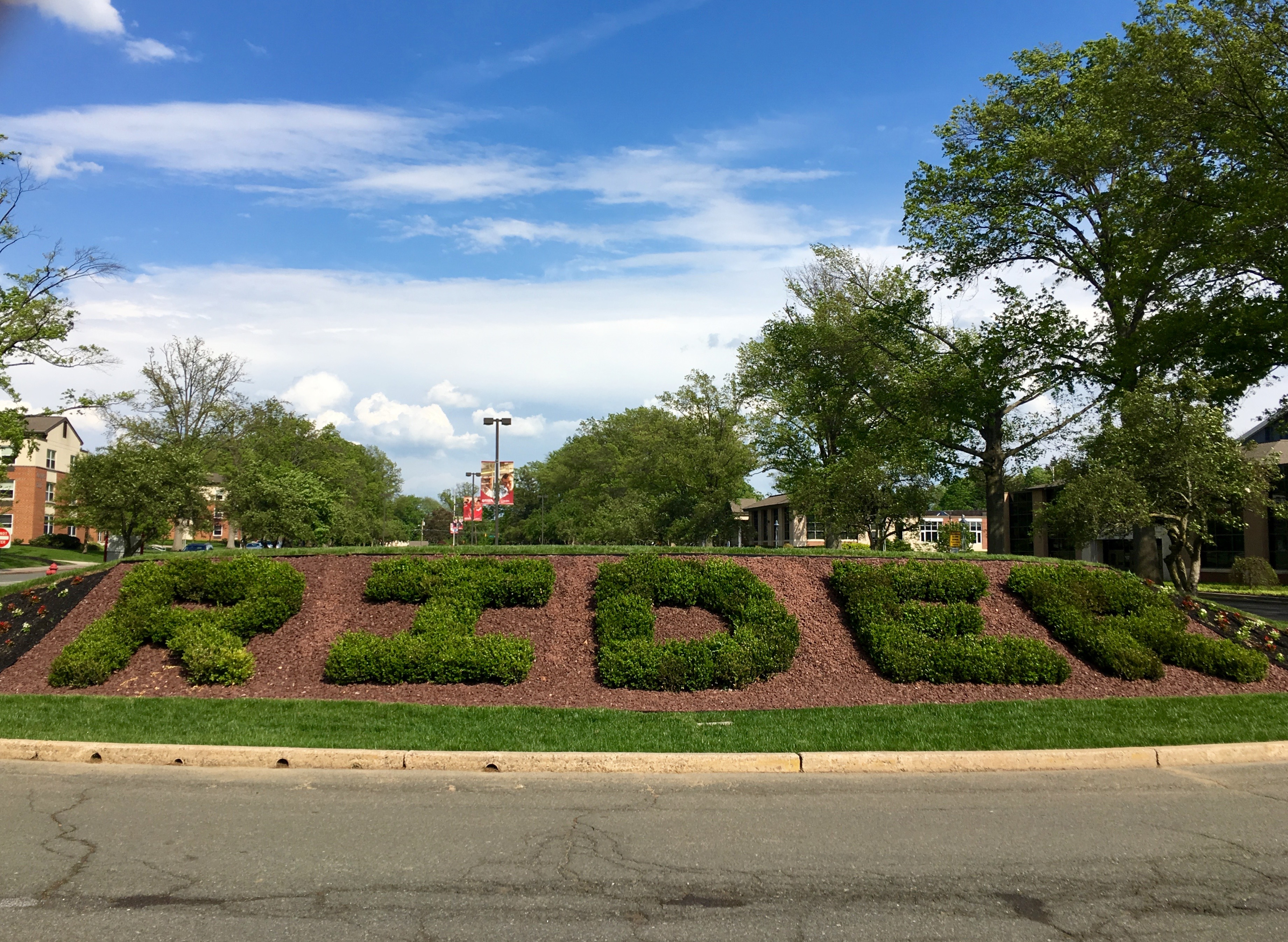
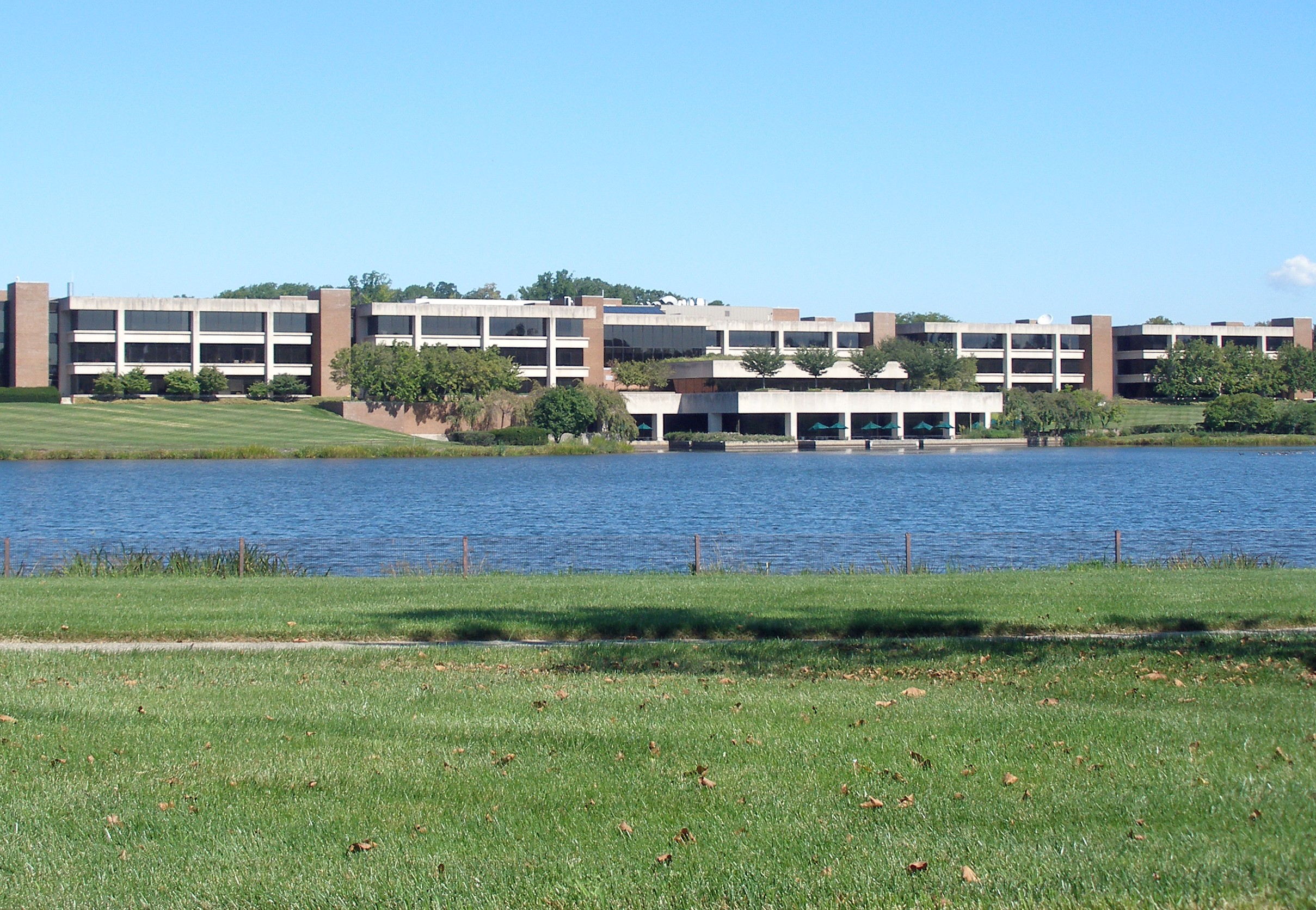
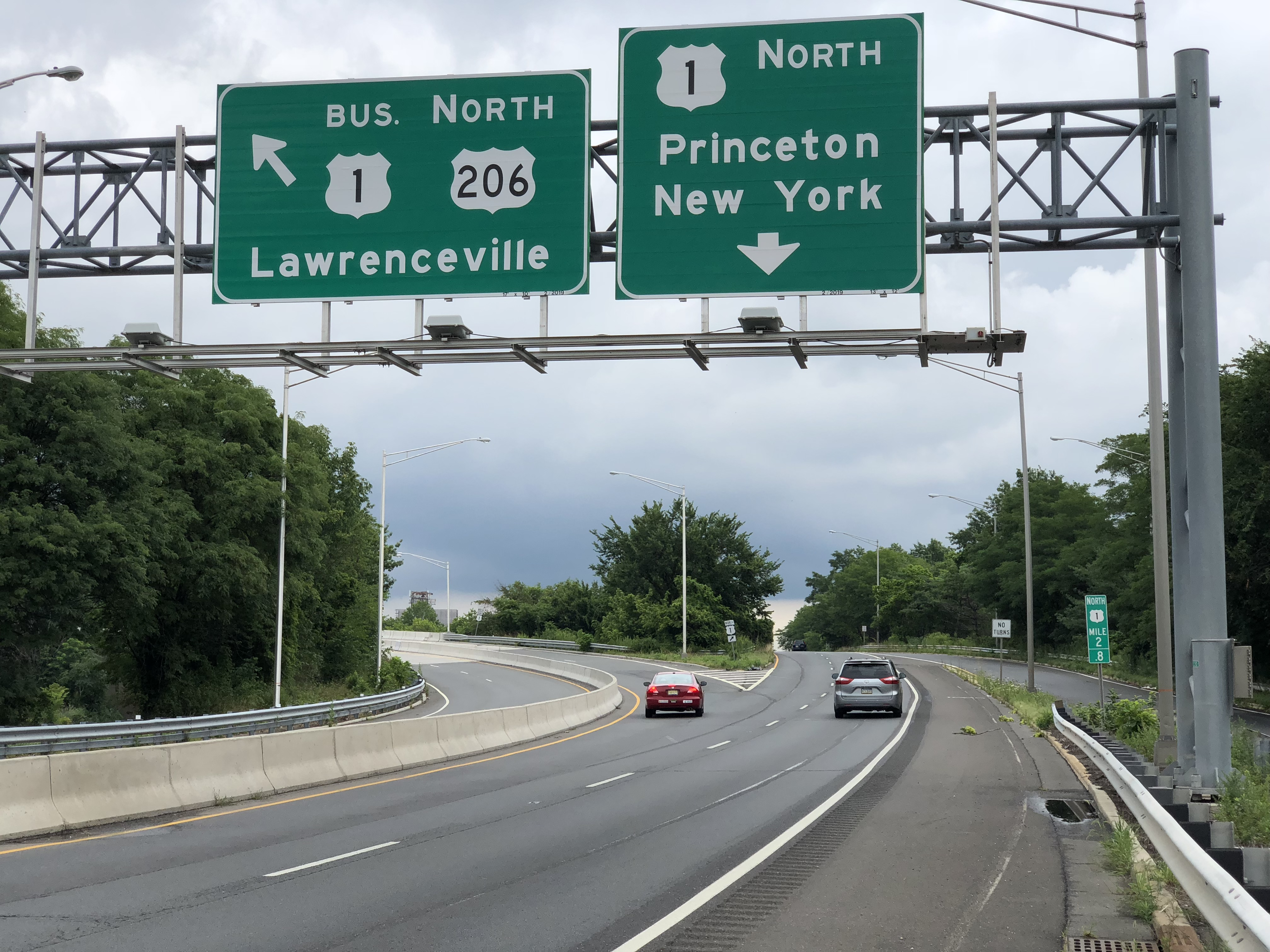
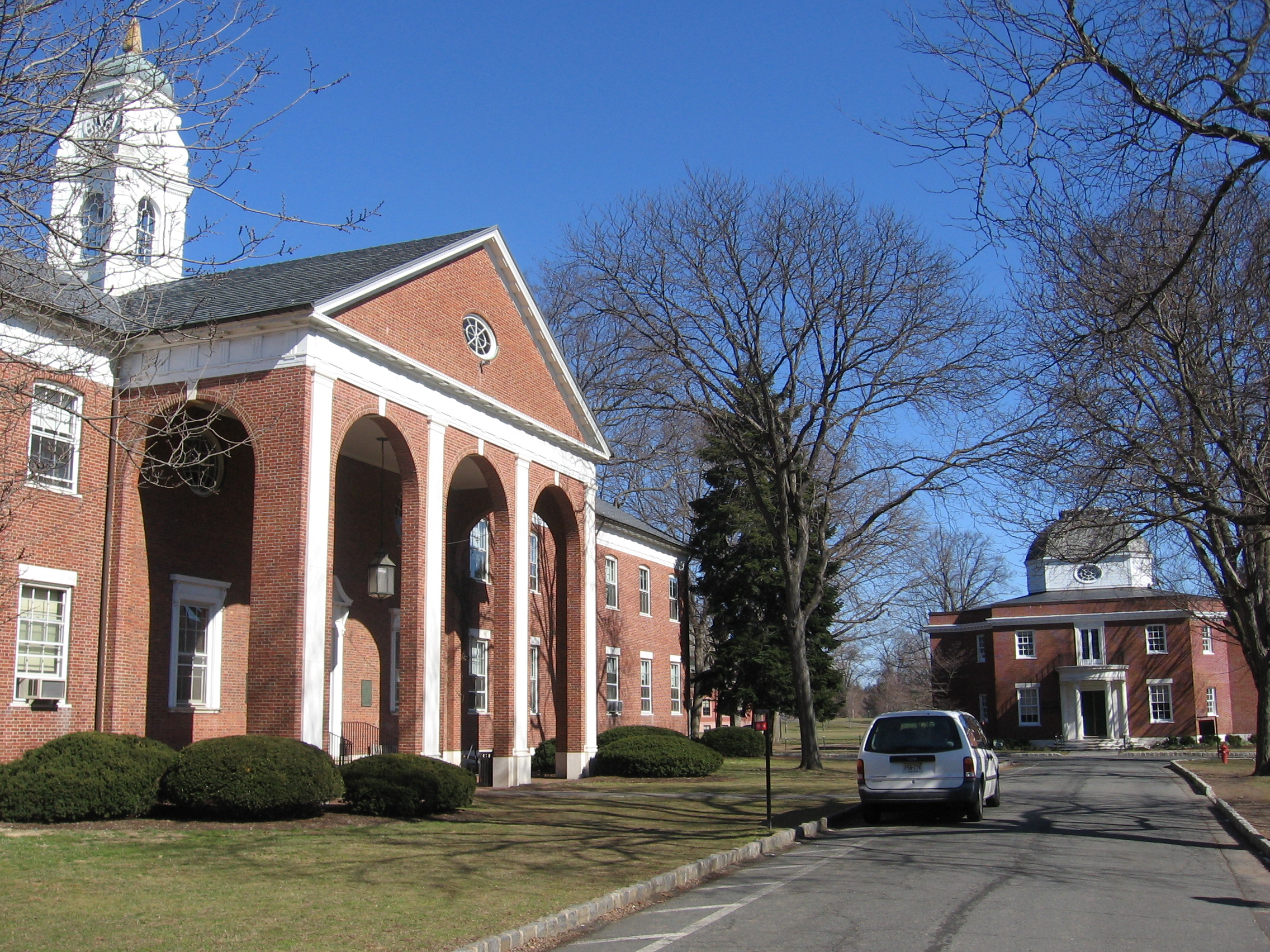
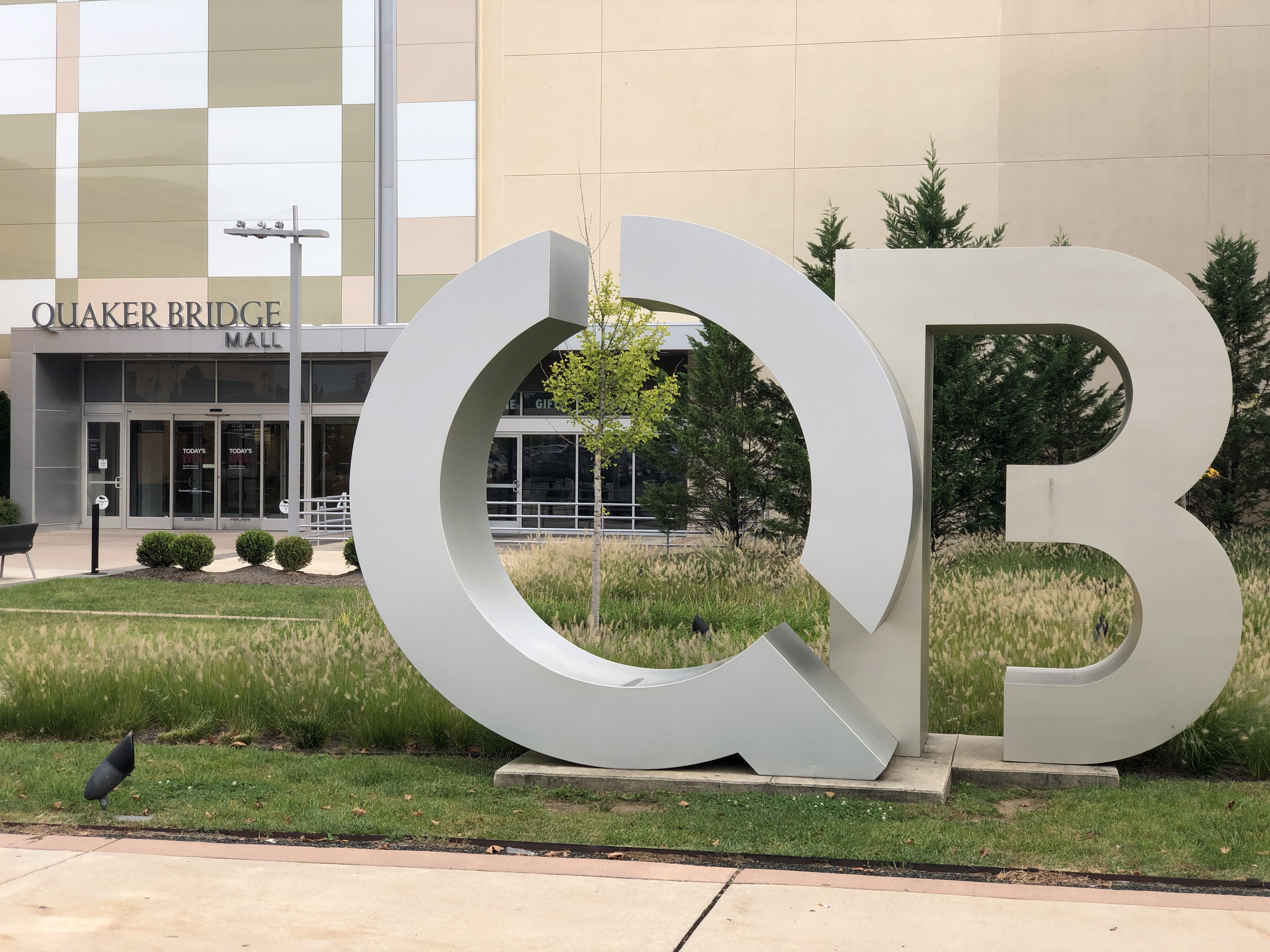
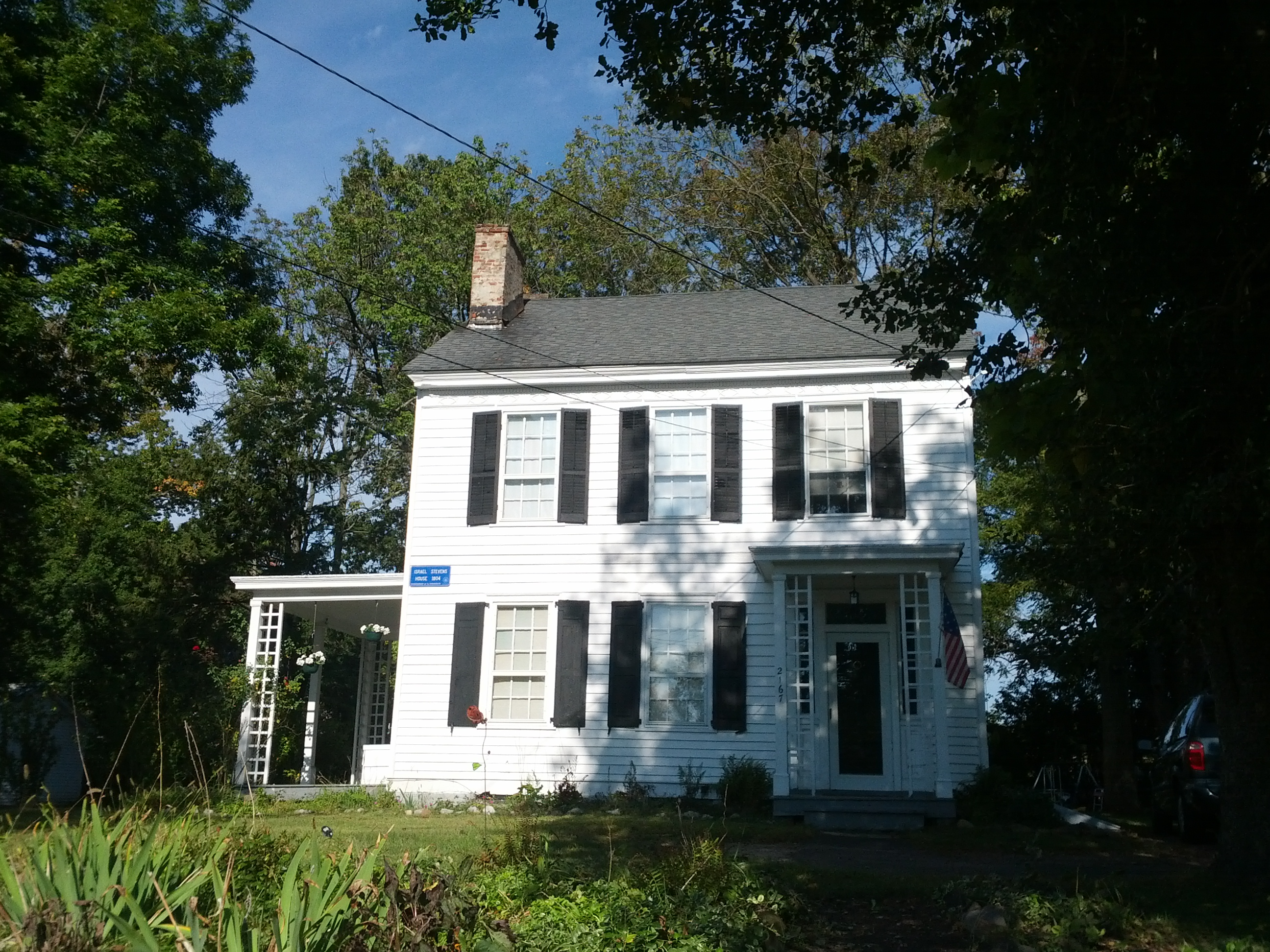
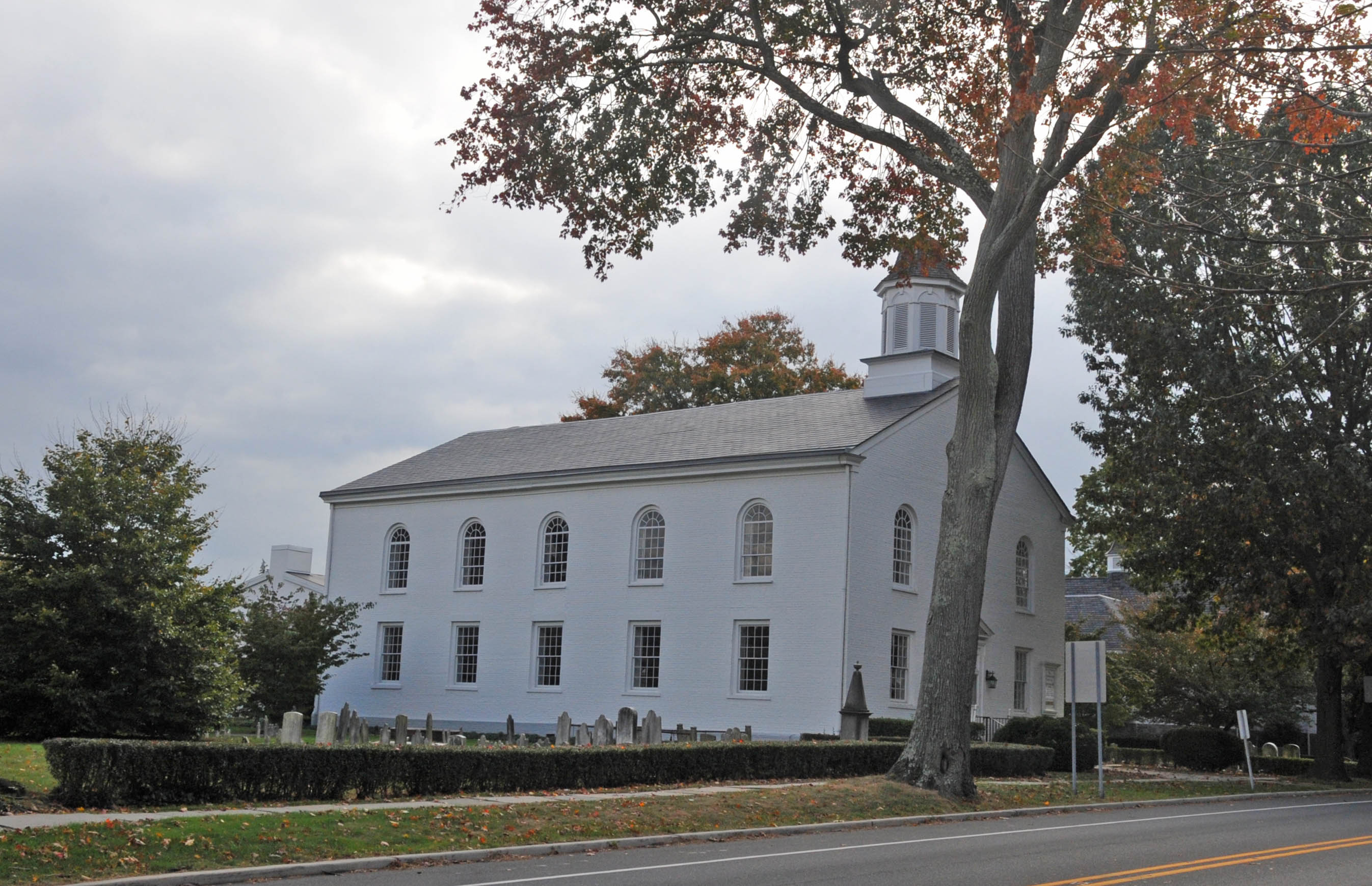
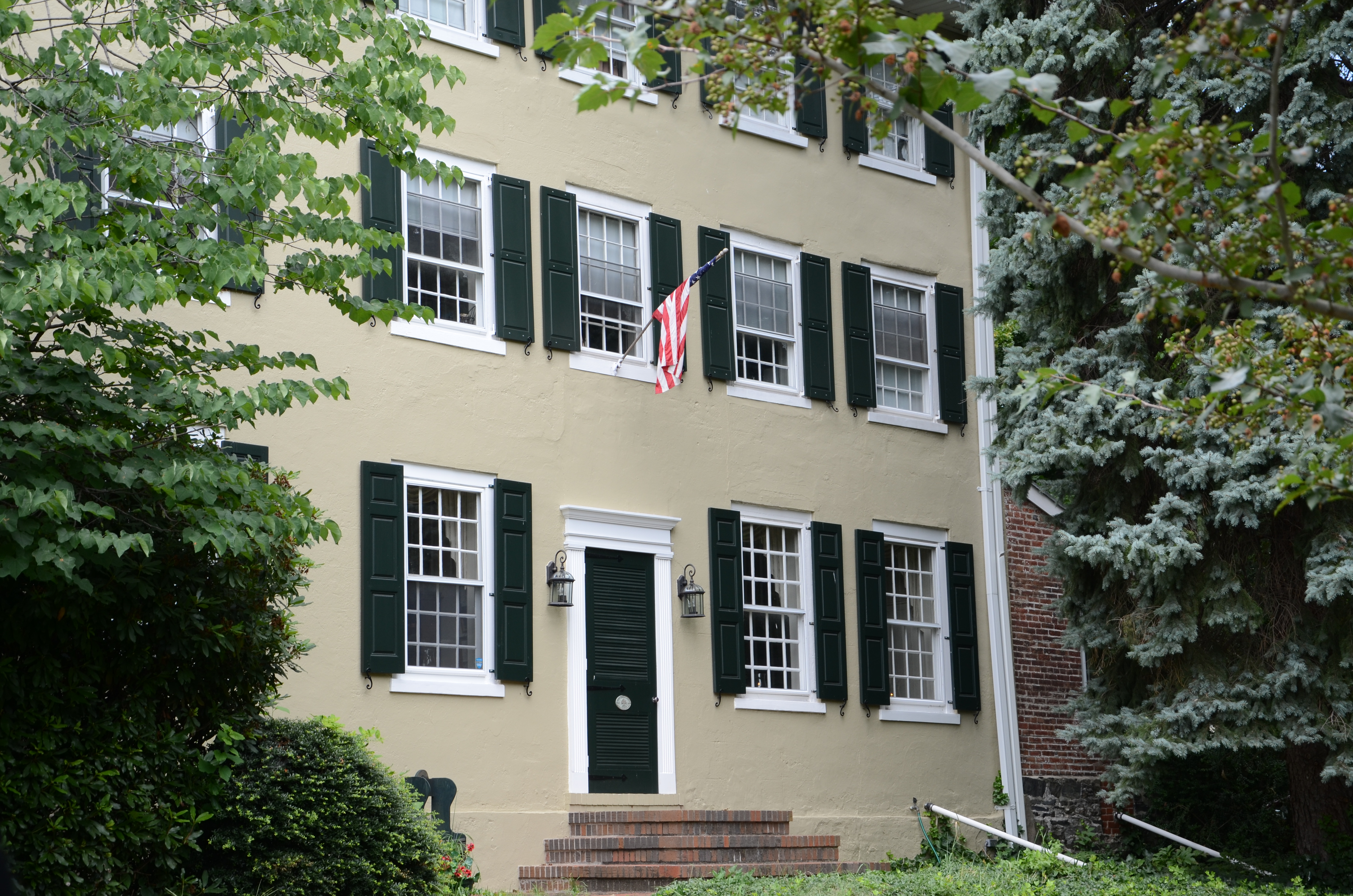
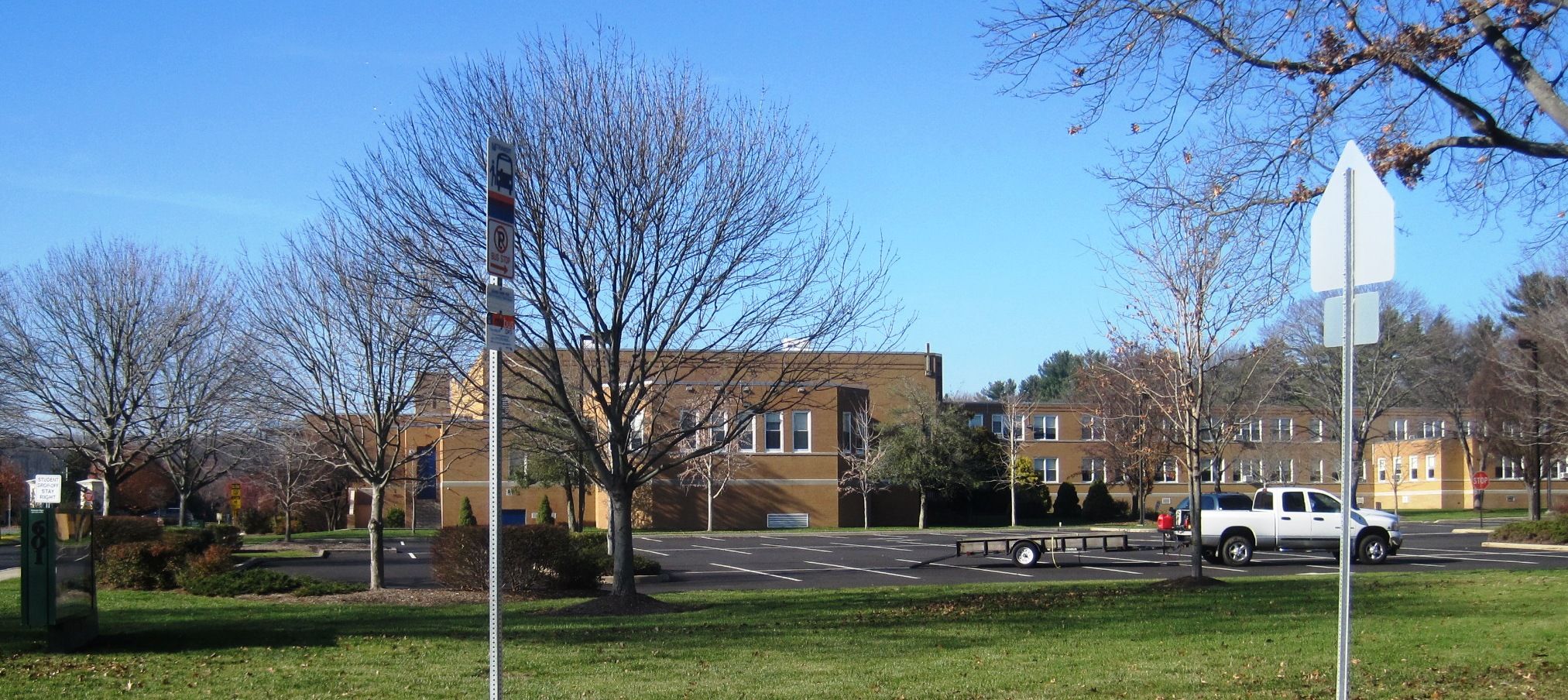
- Rider University Bristol Myers Squibb Headquarters U.S. Route 1 (Trenton Freeway) at the exit for U.S. Route 1 Business and U.S. Route 206 Lawrenceville School Quaker Bridge Mall Israel Stevens House Presbyterian Church of Lawrence, located in the town's main Historic district Anderson–Capner House Notre Dame High School

- Seal
- Nickname: "Where Nature Smiles for 22 Miles"
- Location of Lawrence Township in Mercer County highlighted in red (right). Inset map: Location of Mercer County in New Jersey highlighted in orange (left).

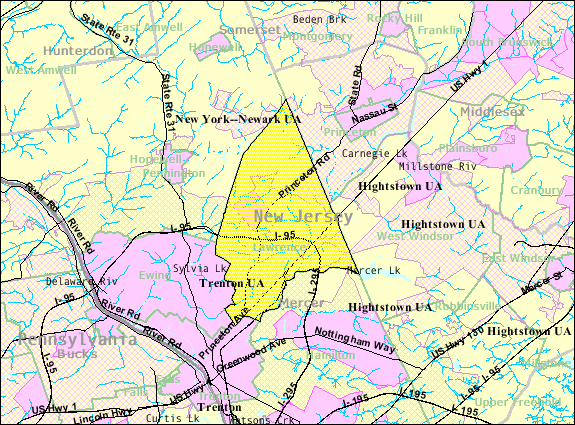
- Census Bureau map of Lawrence Township, Mercer County, New Jersey

- Location in Mercer County Location in New Jersey Location in the United States
- Coordinates: 40.295887°N 74.720093°W
- Country: United States
- State: New Jersey
- County: Mercer
- Formed: February 20, 1697 as Maidenhead Township
- Incorporated: February 21, 1798
- Renamed: January 24, 1816 as Lawrence Township
- Named for: Capt. James Lawrence

Government
  - Type: Faulkner Act (council–manager)
  - Body: Township Council
  - Mayor: Patricia Hendricks Farmer (D, term ends December 31, 2027)
  - Administrator: Kevin P. Nerwinski
  - Municipal clerk: Tonya Carter

Area
  - Total: 21.98 sq mi (56.94 km^{2})
  - Land: 21.73 sq mi (56.27 km^{2})
  - Water: 0.26 sq mi (0.67 km^{2}) 1.17%
  - Rank: 126th of 565 in state 4th of 12 in county
- Elevation: 82 ft (25 m)

Population (2020)
  - Total: 33,077
  - Estimate (2023): 31,771
  - Rank: 70th of 565 in state 4th of 12 in county
  - Density: 1,522.5/sq mi (587.8/km^{2})
  - Rank: 333rd of 565 in state 9th of 12 in county
- Time zone: UTC−05:00 (Eastern (EST))
  - Summer (DST): UTC−04:00 (Eastern (EDT))
- ZIP Code: 08648
- Area code: 609
- FIPS code: 3402139510
- GNIS feature ID: 0882126
- Website: www.lawrencetwp.com

Lawrence Township is a township in Mercer County, in the U.S. state of New Jersey. Located at the cross-roads between the Delaware Valley region to the southwest and the Raritan Valley region to the northeast, the township is an outer-ring suburb of New York City in the New York Metropolitan area, as defined by the United States Census Bureau, while also directly bordering the Philadelphia metropolitan area and is part of the Federal Communications Commission's Philadelphia Designated Market Area.

The home of the prestigious Lawrenceville School, Rider University, and the site of the Quaker Bridge Mall, the township is a regional commercial and cultural hub of central New Jersey. As of the 2020 United States census, the township's population was 33,077, a decrease of 395 (−1.2%) from the 2010 census count of 33,472, which in turn reflected an increase of 4,313 (+14.8%) from the 29,159 counted in the 2000 census.

== History ==
What is now Lawrence Township was originally formed as Maidenhead Township on February 20, 1697, while the area was still part of Burlington County in West Jersey on the eastern boundary of the Province Line (on the other side of which was East Jersey). The township was named by the early Quaker settlers after Maidenhead, a Thames River village west of London.

In 1698, Puritan settlers from Long Island and Connecticut came to Maidenhead and were granted land and established a Presbyterian church. A meetinghouse was erected on the site of the present Presbyterian Church of Lawrenceville in the early 1700s. A record from 1709 indicates that it was used both for a meeting of the Presbytery of Philadelphia and for a session of the Hunterdon County Court. The present structure was built in 1764.

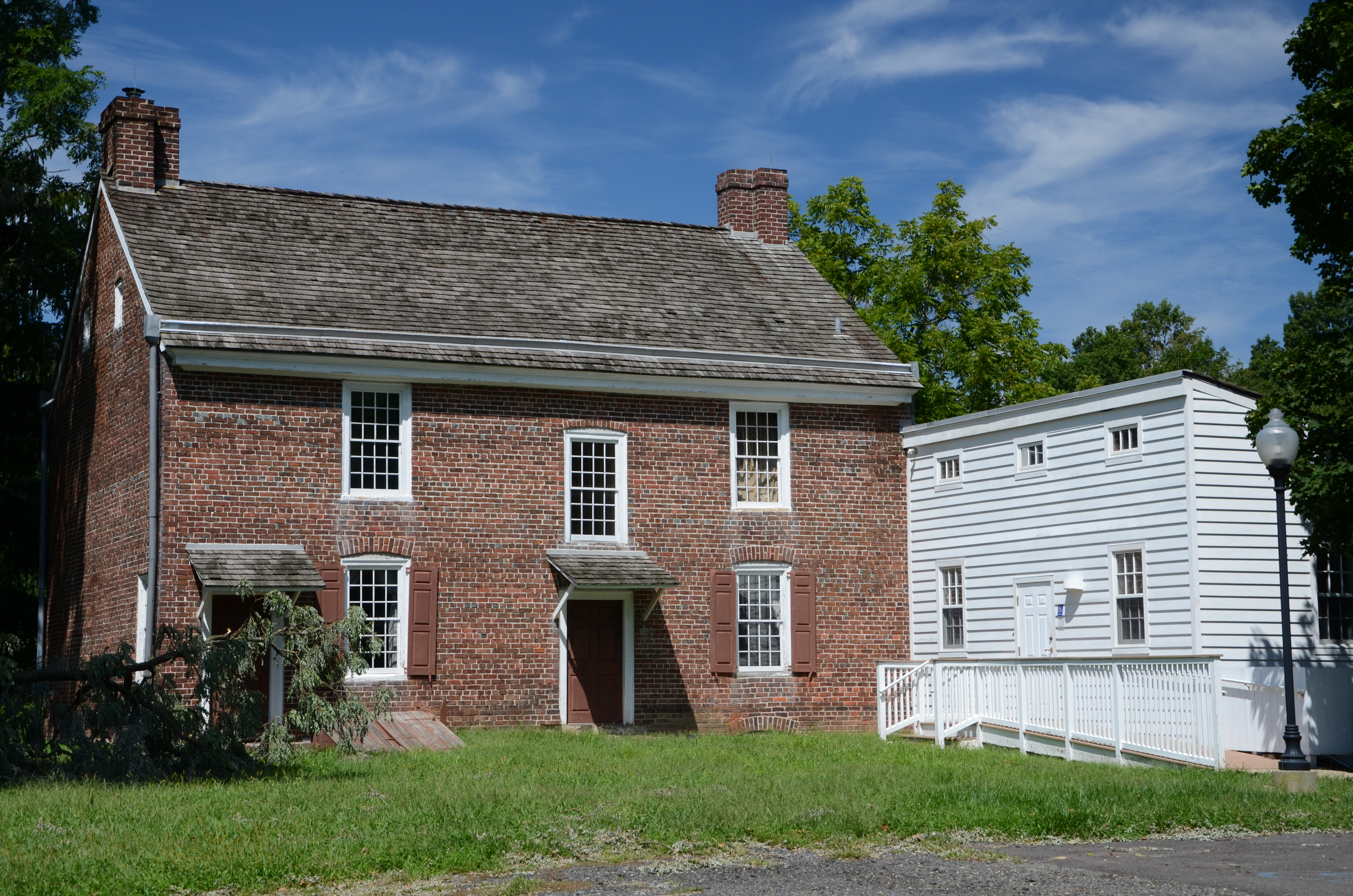
The Baker–Brearley House, one of many colonials located in the historic village of Lawrenceville

The township became part of the newly created Hunterdon County on March 11, 1714. Maidenhead Township was incorporated as one of New Jersey's initial group of 104 townships by an act of the New Jersey Legislature on February 21, 1798.

In 1810, the seventh minister of the church, Isaac V. Brown, began the Maidenhead Academy to prepare young men for college. This school is now the Lawrenceville School.

On January 24, 1816, the municipality was renamed Lawrence Township, in honor of Captain James Lawrence—commander of the frigate USS Chesapeake, one of the naval heroes of the War of 1812, and a native of relatively nearby Burlington, New Jersey—best known for his dying command of "Don't give up the ship". Lawrence Township became part of Mercer County at its creation on February 22, 1838. Portions of the township were taken to form Millham Township on February 10, 1882, which was annexed six years later by Trenton.

On September 23, 2003, at approximately 8:25am, an F1 tornado ripped through Lawrence Township. The tornado followed a path along Princeton Pike and caused widespread damage to homes. There were no fatalities.

Violent crime in Lawrence Township is notably rare. A fatal shooting at an Applebee's restaurant on November 14, 2017, was the first murder in the township in 16 years.

== Geography ==
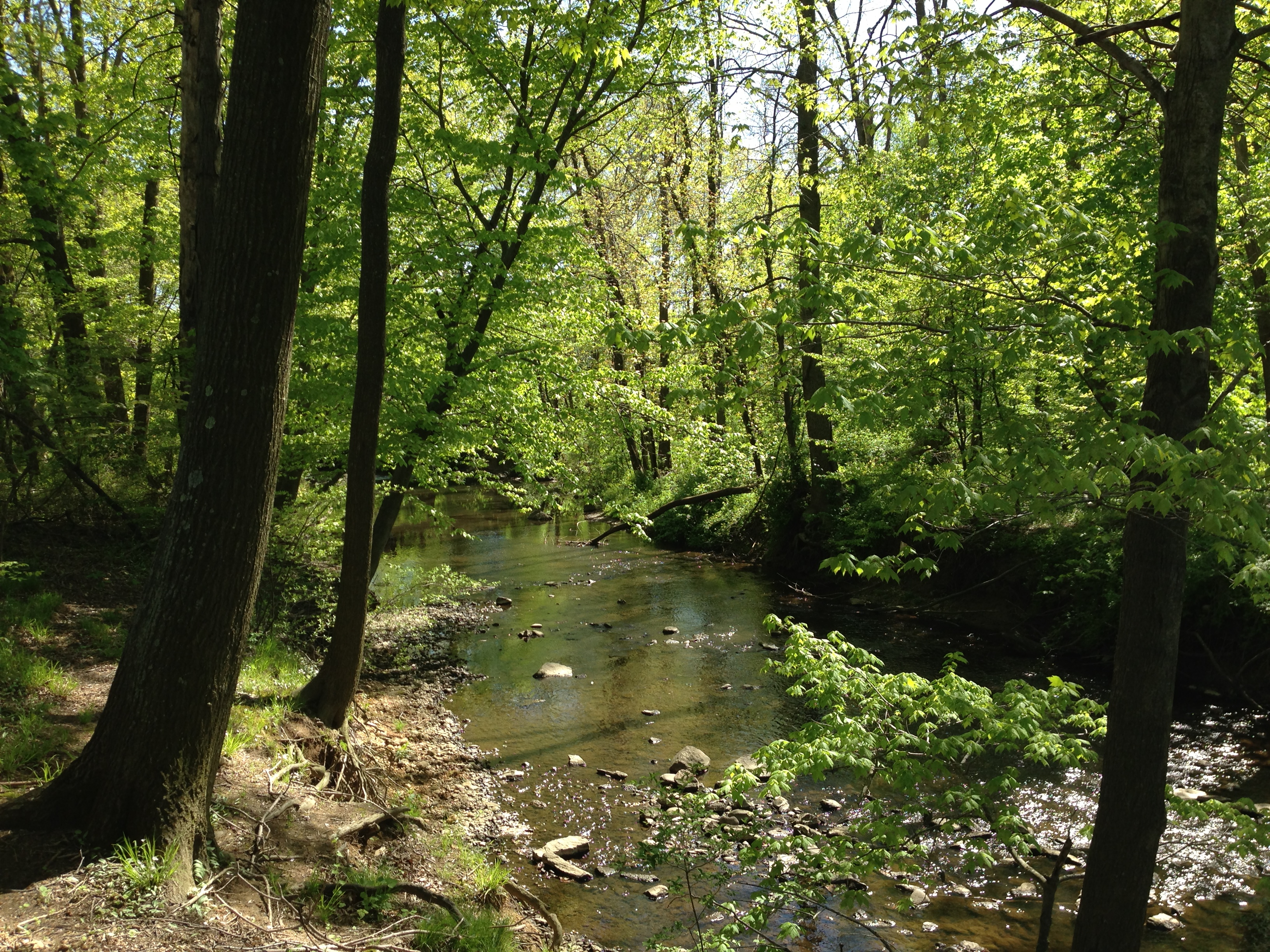
The Shabakunk Creek, below Colonial Lake, flowing in the southern portion of the township towards Trenton.

According to the United States Census Bureau, the township had a total area of 21.98 square miles (56.94 km^{2}), including 21.73 square miles (56.27 km^{2}) of land and 0.26 square miles (0.67 km^{2}) of water (1.17%).

Lawrenceville (with a 2020 Census population of 3,751) is a census-designated place and unincorporated community located within Lawrence Township.

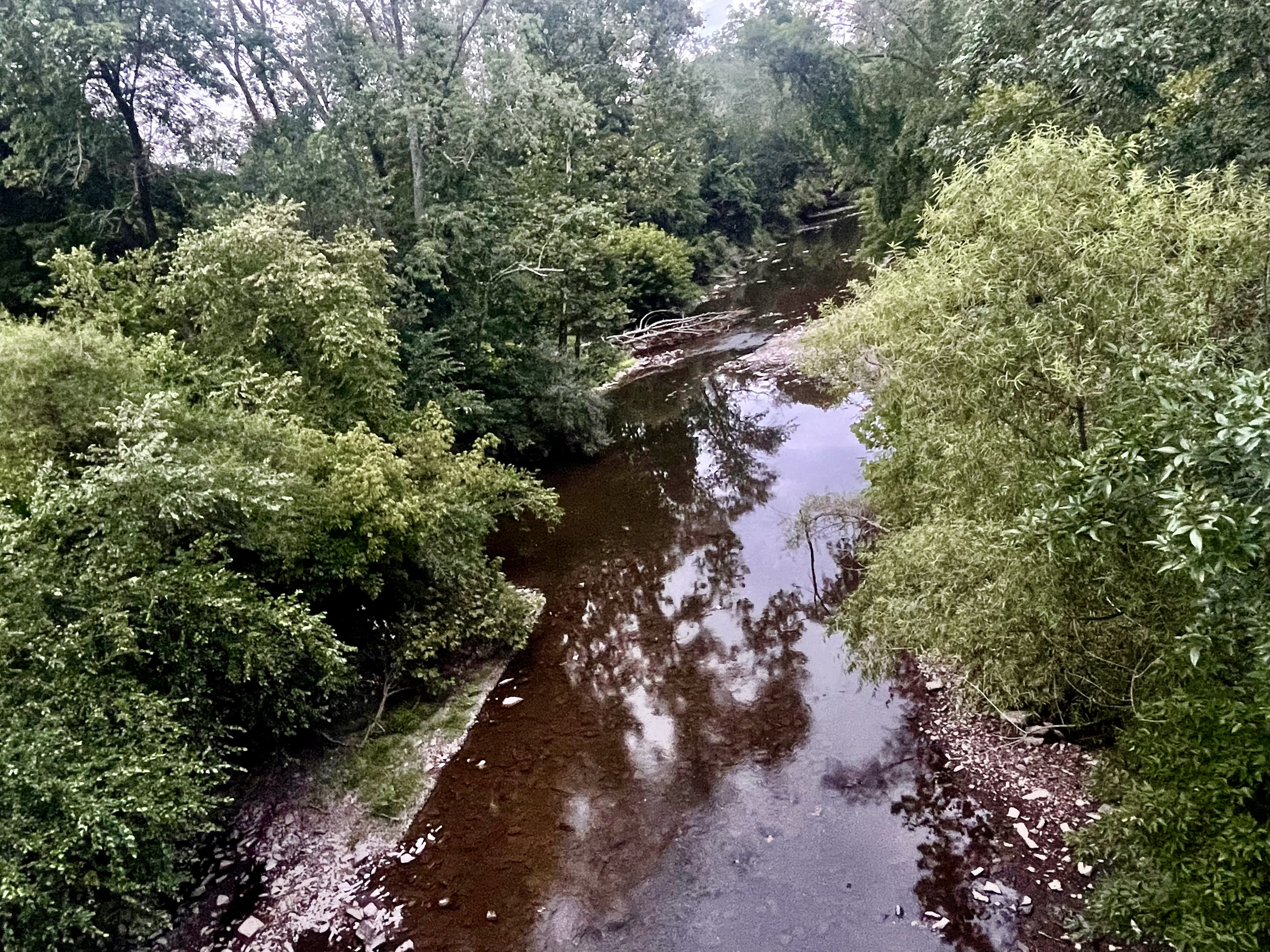
The Stony Brook flowing through the northern portion of the township towards Princeton.

Other unincorporated communities, localities and place names located partially or completely within the township include: Bakersville, Clarksville, Colonial Lakelands, Coxs Corner, Eldridge Park, Franklin Corner, Harneys Corner, Lawrence Station, Lewisville, Louisville, Port Mercer, Princessville, Quaker Bridge, Rosedale, Slackwood and Sturwood Hamlet.

Many area residents often refer to all of Lawrence Township as Lawrenceville, as a significant majority of township residents use a Lawrenceville mailing address as specified by the United States Postal Service, while other residents have mailing addresses in either Princeton or Trenton. The township was notified by the Postal Service in 2007 that the preferred designation for the ZIP code 08648 would be changed to "Lawrence Township".

The township borders the Mercer County municipalities of Ewing Township, Hamilton Township, Hopewell Township, Princeton, Trenton and West Windsor.

== Demographics ==
Historical population
Census	Pop.	Note	%±
1790	1,032		—
1810	1,086		—
1820	1,354		24.7%
1830	1,433		5.8%
1840	1,556		8.6%
1850	1,838		18.1%
1860	2,024		10.1%
1870	2,251		11.2%
1880	3,174		41.0%
1890	1,448	*	−54.4%
1900	1,555		7.4%
1910	2,522		62.2%
1920	3,686		46.2%
1930	6,293		70.7%
1940	6,522		3.6%
1950	8,499		30.3%
1960	13,665		60.8%
1970	19,567		43.2%
1980	19,724		0.8%
1990	25,787		30.7%
2000	29,159		13.1%
2010	33,472		14.8%
2020	33,077		−1.2%
2023 (est.)	31,771		−3.9%
Population sources: 1790–1920 1840; 1850–1870 1850; 1870 1880–1890; 1890–1910 1910–1930; 1940–2000 2000; 2010 2020 * = Lost territory in previous decade

=== 2010 census ===
The 2010 United States census counted 33,472 people, 12,524 households, and 8,116 families in the township. The population density was 1,534.8 per square mile (592.6/km^{2}). There were 13,239 housing units at an average density of 607.1 per square mile (234.4/km^{2}). The racial makeup was 69.68% (23,322) White, 10.76% (3,602) Black or African American, 0.20% (66) Native American, 14.10% (4,721) Asian, 0.09% (29) Pacific Islander, 2.73% (913) from other races, and 2.45% (819) from two or more races. Hispanic or Latino of any race were 7.48% (2,503) of the population.

Of the 12,524 households, 29.2% had children under the age of 18; 51.1% were married couples living together; 10.5% had a female householder with no husband present and 35.2% were non-families. Of all households, 29.2% were made up of individuals and 11.3% had someone living alone who was 65 years of age or older. The average household size was 2.45 and the average family size was 3.07.

20.0% of the population were under the age of 18, 13.5% from 18 to 24, 26.0% from 25 to 44, 26.7% from 45 to 64, and 13.8% who were 65 years of age or older. The median age was 38.3 years. For every 100 females, the population had 86.8 males. For every 100 females ages 18 and older there were 82.7 males.

The Census Bureau's 2006–2010 American Community Survey showed that (in 2010 inflation-adjusted dollars) median household income was $88,693 (with a margin of error of +/– $5,442) and the median family income was $108,743 (+/– $4,377). Males had a median income of $68,305 (+/– $6,890) versus $50,103 (+/– $5,345) for females. The per capita income for the borough was $43,136 (+/– $3,030). About 4.4% of families and 5.8% of the population were below the poverty line, including 7.8% of those under age 18 and 6.2% of those age 65 or over.

=== 2000 census ===
As of the 2000 United States census there were 29,159 people, 10,797 households, and 7,233 families residing in the township. The population density was 1,317.0 inhabitants per square mile (508.5/km^{2}). There were 11,180 housing units at an average density of 504.9 per square mile (194.9/km^{2}). The racial makeup of the township was 79.22% White, 9.28% African American, 0.08% Native American, 7.91% Asian, 0.11% Pacific Islander, 1.79% from other races, and 1.60% from two or more races. Hispanic or Latino of any race were 4.61% of the population.

There were 10,797 households, out of which 31.4% had children under the age of 18 living with them, 53.9% were married couples living together, 10.5% had a female householder with no husband present, and 33.0% were non-families. 26.8% of all households were made up of individuals, and 9.7% had someone living alone who was 65 years of age or older. The average household size was 2.49 and the average family size was 3.05.

In the township the population was spread out, with 21.7% under the age of 18, 12.4% from 18 to 24, 29.4% from 25 to 44, 23.0% from 45 to 64, and 13.6% who were 65 years of age or older. The median age was 37 years. For every 100 females, there were 88.0 males. For every 100 females age 18 and over, there were 84.4 males.

The median income for a household in the township was $67,959, and the median income for a family was $82,704. Males had a median income of $56,681 versus $38,468 for females. The per capita income for the township was $33,120. About 2.6% of families and 4.9% of the population were below the poverty line, including 4.0% of those under age 18 and 6.0% of those age 65 or over.

== Economy ==
Lawrence Township is home to the headquarters of the Educational Testing Service and Bristol-Myers Squibb's Research & Development Division.

Quaker Bridge Mall is a two-level, indoor shopping center located in Lawrenceville on U.S. 1, near Interstate 295. The mall opened in 1975, and has over 100 retail establishments. The mall's anchor stores include J.C. Penney, Macy's, and Old Navy. The mall has a gross leasable area of 1,076,000 square feet (100,000 m^{2}). Quaker Bridge Mall also had a renovation in 2011–2012, and was finished around August 2012.

Lawrenceville has a small business district near the Lawrenceville School. The Lawrence Shopping Center and other businesses along U.S. Route 1 provide additional commercial clusters in the township.

The transmitter for WKXW-FM, better known as New Jersey 101.5, is located near the Quaker Bridge Mall.

== Government ==
=== Local government ===
Lawrence Township operates within the Faulkner Act, formally known as the Optional Municipal Charter Law, under the Council-Manager form of municipal government, which was implemented in 1970. The township is one of 42 municipalities (of the 564) statewide that use this form of government. The governing body is composed of five Council Members who are elected at-large in partisan elections to serve four-year terms on a staggered basis, with either two or three seats coming up for election in odd-numbered years as part of the November general election. At a reorganization meeting held in January after each election, a Mayor is selected by the council from among its members to serve a term of two years.

As of 2025, members of the Lawrence Township Council are Mayor Patricia Hendricks Farmer (D, term on committee and as mayor ends December 31, 2027), Chris Bobbitt (D, 2025), James S. Kownacki (D, 2025), Olympia I’Liou Perry (D, 2027) and John T. Ryan (D, 2027).

In January 2023, the township council selected Catherin MacDuff to fill the seat expiring in December 2023 that had been held by Cathleen M. Lewis until she resigned from office earlier that month to take a seat on the Mercer County Board of County Commissioners.

In August 2015, the Township Council appointed Ian J. Dember on an interim basis to fill the seat expiring in December 2017 that had been held by Stephen Brame until his death the previous month. In the November 2015 general election, Democrat Chris Bobbitt was elected to serve the balance of the term.

=== Federal, state, and county representation ===
Lawrence Township is located in the 3rd Congressional District and is part of New Jersey's 15th state legislative district.

For the 119th United States Congress, New Jersey's 3rd congressional district is currently represented Herb Conaway (D, Delran Township). New Jersey is represented in the United States Senate by Democrats Cory Booker (Newark, term ends 2027) and Andy Kim (Moorestown, term ends 2031).

For the 2026–2027 session, the 15th legislative district of the New Jersey Legislature is represented in the State Senate by Shirley Turner (D, Lawrence Township) and in the General Assembly by Verlina Reynolds-Jackson (D, Trenton) and Anthony Verrelli (D, Hopewell Township).

Mercer County is governed by a County Executive who oversees the day-to-day operations of the county and by a seven-member Board of County Commissioners that acts in a legislative capacity, setting policy. All officials are chosen at-large in partisan elections, with the executive serving a four-year term of office while the commissioners serve three-year terms of office on a staggered basis, with either two or three seats up for election each year as part of the November general election. As of 2025, the County Executive is Daniel R. Benson (D, Hamilton Township) whose term of office ends December 31, 2027. Mercer County's Commissioners are:

Lucylle R. S. Walter (D, Ewing Township, 2026), Chair John A. Cimino (D, Hamilton Township, 2026), Samuel T. Frisby Sr. (D, Trenton, 2027), Cathleen M. Lewis (D, Lawrence Township, 2025), Vice Chair Kristin L. McLaughlin (D, Hopewell Township, 2027), Nina D. Melker (D, Hamilton Township, 2025) and Terrance Stokes (D, Ewing Township, 2027).

Mercer County's constitutional officers are: Clerk Paula Sollami-Covello (D, Lawrence Township, 2025), Sheriff John A. Kemler (D, Hamilton Township, 2026) and Surrogate Diane Gerofsky (D, Lawrence Township, 2026).

New Jersey Lottery is headquartered in the One Lawrence Park Complex in Lawrence Township.

=== Politics ===
As of March 2011, there were a total of 19,237 registered voters in Lawrence Township, of which 7,718 (40.1%) were registered as Democrats, 3,152 (16.4%) were registered as Republicans and 8,342 (43.4%) were registered as Unaffiliated. There were 25 voters registered as Libertarians or Greens.

United States presidential election results for Lawrence Township
Year	Republican		Democratic		Third party(ies)	
Year	No.	%	No.	%	No.	%
2024	4,773	29.19%	11,147	68.16%	433	2.65%
2020	4,879	27.97%	12,300	70.51%	265	1.52%
2016	4,231	28.35%	10,490	70.30%	201	1.35%
2012	4,688	31.92%	9,798	66.71%	201	1.37%
2008	4,771	31.86%	10,025	66.95%	177	1.18%
2004	5,228	37.24%	8,658	61.68%	151	1.08%

In the 2012 presidential election, Democrat Barack Obama received 66.7% of the vote (9,798 cast), ahead of Republican Mitt Romney with 31.9% (4,688 votes), and other candidates with 1.4% (201 votes), among the 16,398 ballots cast by the township's 20,890 registered voters (1,711 ballots were spoiled), for a turnout of 78.5%. In the 2008 presidential election, Democrat Barack Obama received 66.3% of the vote (10,025 cast), ahead of Republican John McCain with 31.6% (4,771 votes) and other candidates with 1.2% (177 votes), among the 15,115 ballots cast by the township's 19,981 registered voters, for a turnout of 75.6%.

Gubernatorial election results for Lawrence Township
Year	Republican		Democratic		Third party(ies)	
Year	No.	%	No.	%	No.	%
2025	3,337	25.20%	9,836	74.28%	69	0.52%
2021	3,259	30.50%	7,323	68.54%	102	0.95%
2017	2,777	29.88%	6,318	67.98%	199	2.14%
2013	4,634	51.39%	4,205	46.63%	178	1.97%
2009	3,858	38.55%	5,528	55.23%	623	6.22%
2005	3,724	38.35%	5,647	58.16%	339	3.49%

In the 2013 gubernatorial election, Republican Chris Christie received 51.4% of the vote (4,634 cast), ahead of Democrat Barbara Buono with 46.6% (4,205 votes), and other candidates with 2.0% (178 votes), among the 9,276 ballots cast by the township's 20,298 registered voters (259 ballots were spoiled), for a turnout of 45.7%. In the 2009 gubernatorial election, Democrat Jon Corzine received 54.7% of the vote (5,528 ballots cast), ahead of Republican Chris Christie with 38.1% (3,858 votes), Independent Chris Daggett with 5.3% (537 votes) and other candidates with 0.9% (86 votes), among the 10,113 ballots cast by the township's 19,495 registered voters, yielding a 51.9% turnout.

United States Senate election results for Lawrence Township1
Year	Republican		Democratic		Third party(ies)	
Year	No.	%	No.	%	No.	%
2024	4,288	27.00%	11,163	70.28%	432	2.72%
2018	3,401	31.43%	6,998	64.66%	423	3.91%
2012	4,302	30.72%	9,389	67.04%	314	2.24%
2006	3,309	35.39%	5,815	62.20%	225	2.41%

United States Senate election results for Lawrence Township2
Year	Republican		Democratic		Third party(ies)	
Year	No.	%	No.	%	No.	%
2020	5,018	29.29%	11,844	69.13%	271	1.58%
2014	2,433	30.66%	5,370	67.67%	132	1.66%
2013	1,900	26.67%	5,158	72.41%	65	0.91%
2008	5,128	36.50%	8,614	61.31%	308	2.19%

== Education ==
=== Public schools ===
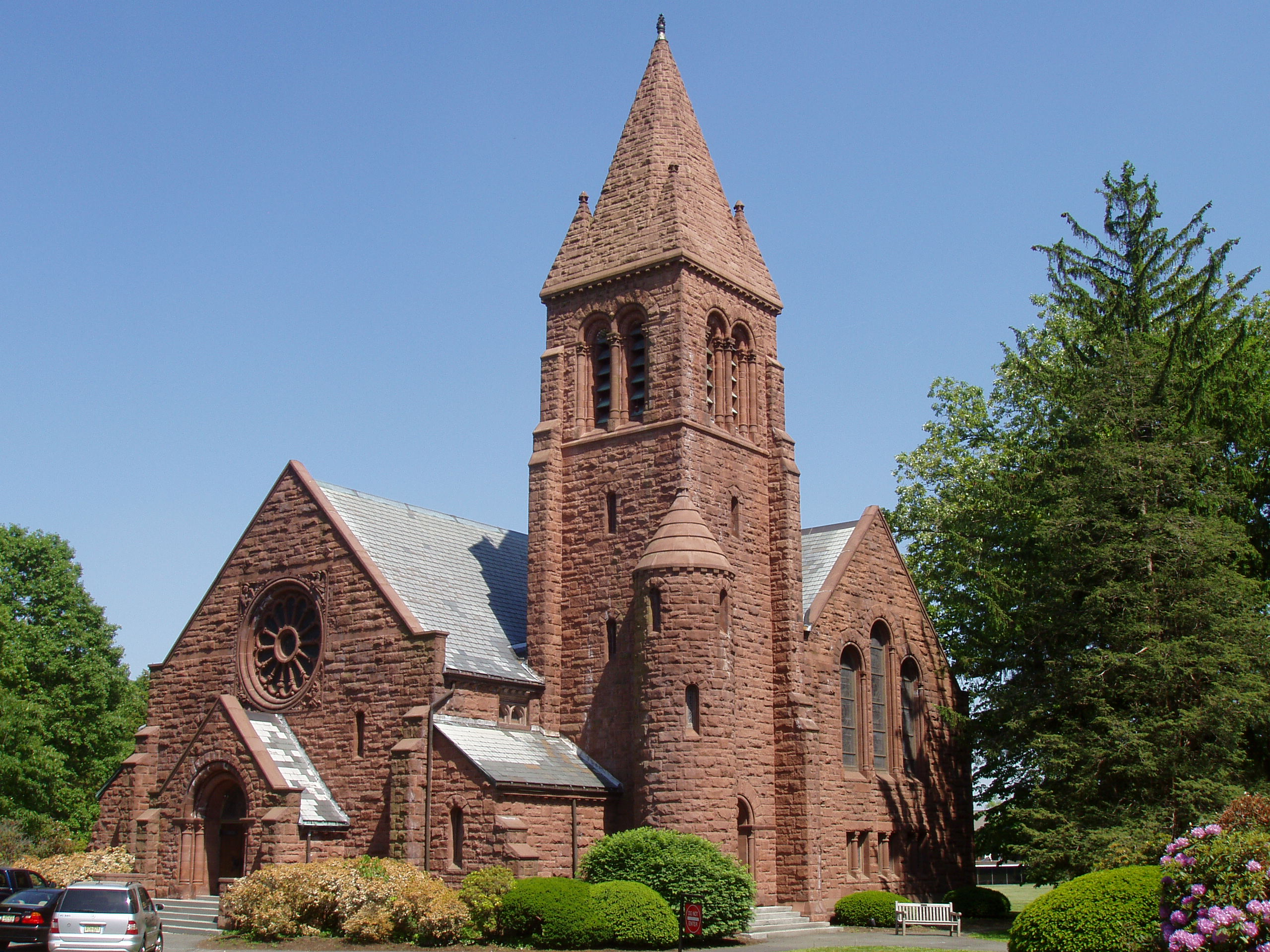
Edith Memorial Chapel at the Lawrenceville School

The Lawrence Township Public Schools serve students in pre-kindergarten through twelfth grade. As of the 2020–21 school year, the district, comprised of seven schools, had an enrollment of 3,707 students and NA classroom teachers (on an FTE basis), for a student–teacher ratio of NA:1. in the district (with 2020–21 enrollment data from the National Center for Education Statistics) are Eldridge Park Elementary School with 203 students in grades K-3, Ben Franklin Elementary School with NA students in grades PreK-3, Lawrenceville Elementary School with 286 students in grades PreK-3, Slackwood Elementary School with 219 students in grades K-3, Lawrence Intermediate School with 807 students in grades 4–6, Lawrence Middle School with 603 students in grades 7-8 and Lawrence High School with 1,167 students in grades 9–12.

Eighth grade students from all of Mercer County are eligible to apply to attend the high school programs offered by the Mercer County Technical Schools, a county-wide vocational school district that offers full-time career and technical education at its Health Sciences Academy, STEM Academy and Academy of Culinary Arts, with no tuition charged to students for attendance.

=== Private schools ===
Lawrence Township is home to two Catholic schools operated by the Diocese of Trenton: Notre Dame High School is a coeducational, Roman Catholic, college preparatory school for students in grades 9–12 and Saint Ann School, which was opened in 1964 and serves students in preK-3 through eighth grade.

Lawrenceville is home to the Lawrenceville School, a coeducational, independent boarding school for ninth through twelfth grades, founded in 1810, making it one of the nation's oldest boarding prep schools.

Princeton Junior School is a private, co-educational school for students in grades K–6, now located on a 7-acre (2.8 ha) site at 3270 Lawrenceville Road in Lawrence Township. The school was founded in 1983 in a church basement in Princeton.

=== Colleges and universities ===
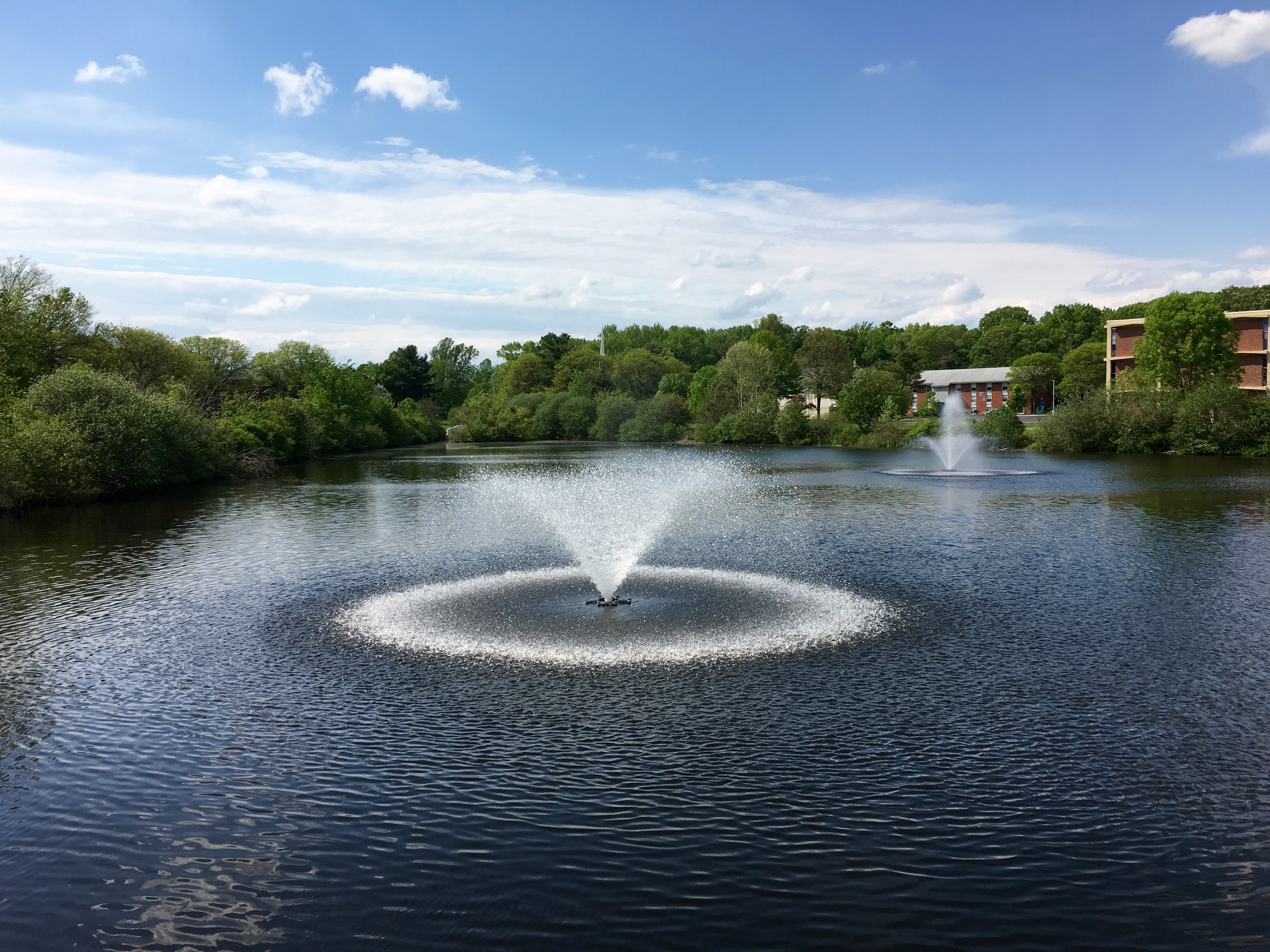
Centennial Lake at Rider University

Founded in 1865 and granted university status in 1992, Rider University is a private university with its main campus just south of Lawrenceville that serves nearly 6,000 undergraduate and graduate students.

=== Miscellaneous education ===
Founded in 1947, Lawrence Township has been the headquarters location for the Educational Testing Service since 1964.

The Princeton Community Japanese Language School teaches weekend Japanese classes for Japanese citizen children abroad to the standard of the Ministry of Education, Culture, Sports, Science and Technology (MEXT), and it also has classes for people with Japanese as a second language. Courses are taught at Memorial Hall at Rider University. The main office of the school is in Princeton although the office used on Sundays is in Memorial Hall.

Yinghua Chinese School: In May 2002, the residents including Asian/Chinese as well as non-Asian/Chinese population established a Chinese language school where students of all cultural and ethnic backgrounds could learn the Chinese language on Sunday afternoons. From September 2002 to June 2005, Lawrence Middle School was the host to YingHua Language School, which teaches Simplified Chinese to over 200 students. Between September 2005 to 2017, YingHua was residing in Rider University. Since 2018 Yinghua has been residing in Chapin School and offer classes on Sunday afternoons. During COVID19, Yinghua Chinese School has continued its teaching virtually.

Since 2001, HindiUSA has been offering classes in the Lawrence Middle School where all students can learn Hindi on Friday evenings. Starting 2012 the class was moved to Notre Dame High School.

== Historic District ==
The Lawrence Township Historic District is a 550-acre (220 ha) historic district encompassing the community of Lawrenceville, consisting of a number of buildings along U.S. Route 206 (formerly King's Highway, as well as the Lincoln Highway), two early cemeteries associated with the Presbyterian Church of Lawrenceville (Est. 1697), and the Lawrenceville School. It was added to the National Register of Historic Places on September 14, 1972 for its significance in architecture, landscape architecture, literature, military history, and transportation. The district includes 45 contributing buildings.

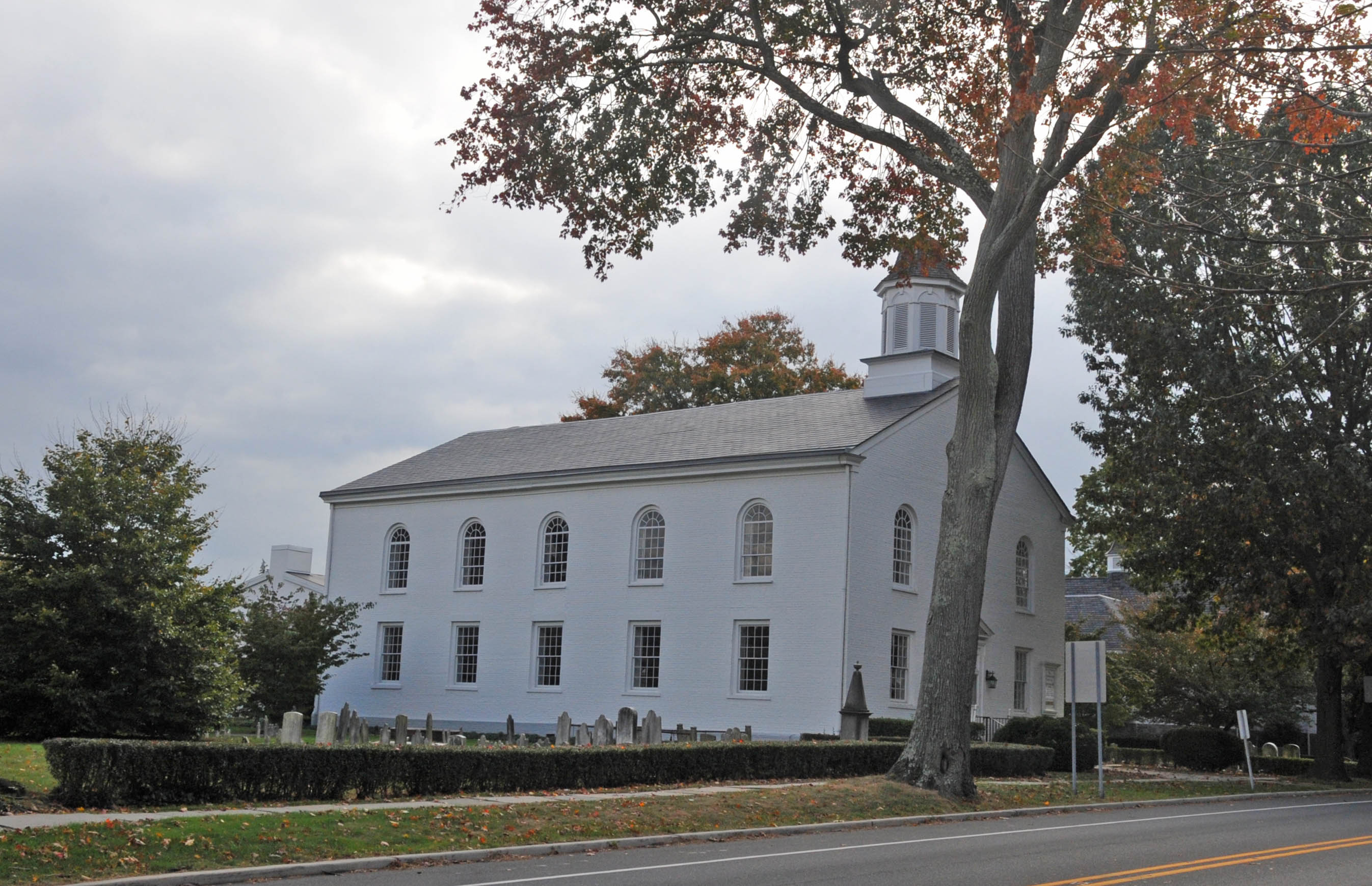
Presbyterian Church of Lawrenceville

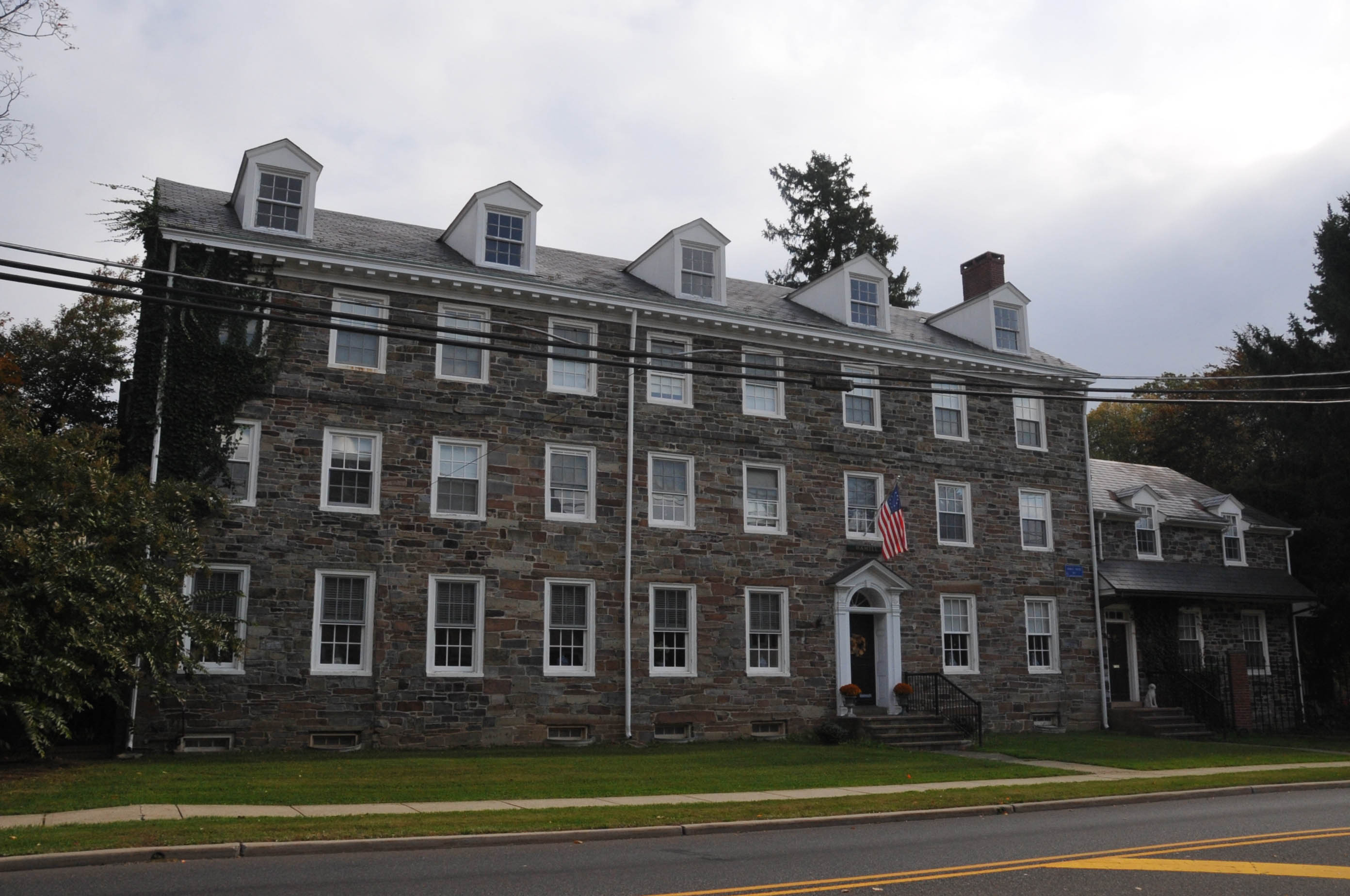
Hamill House

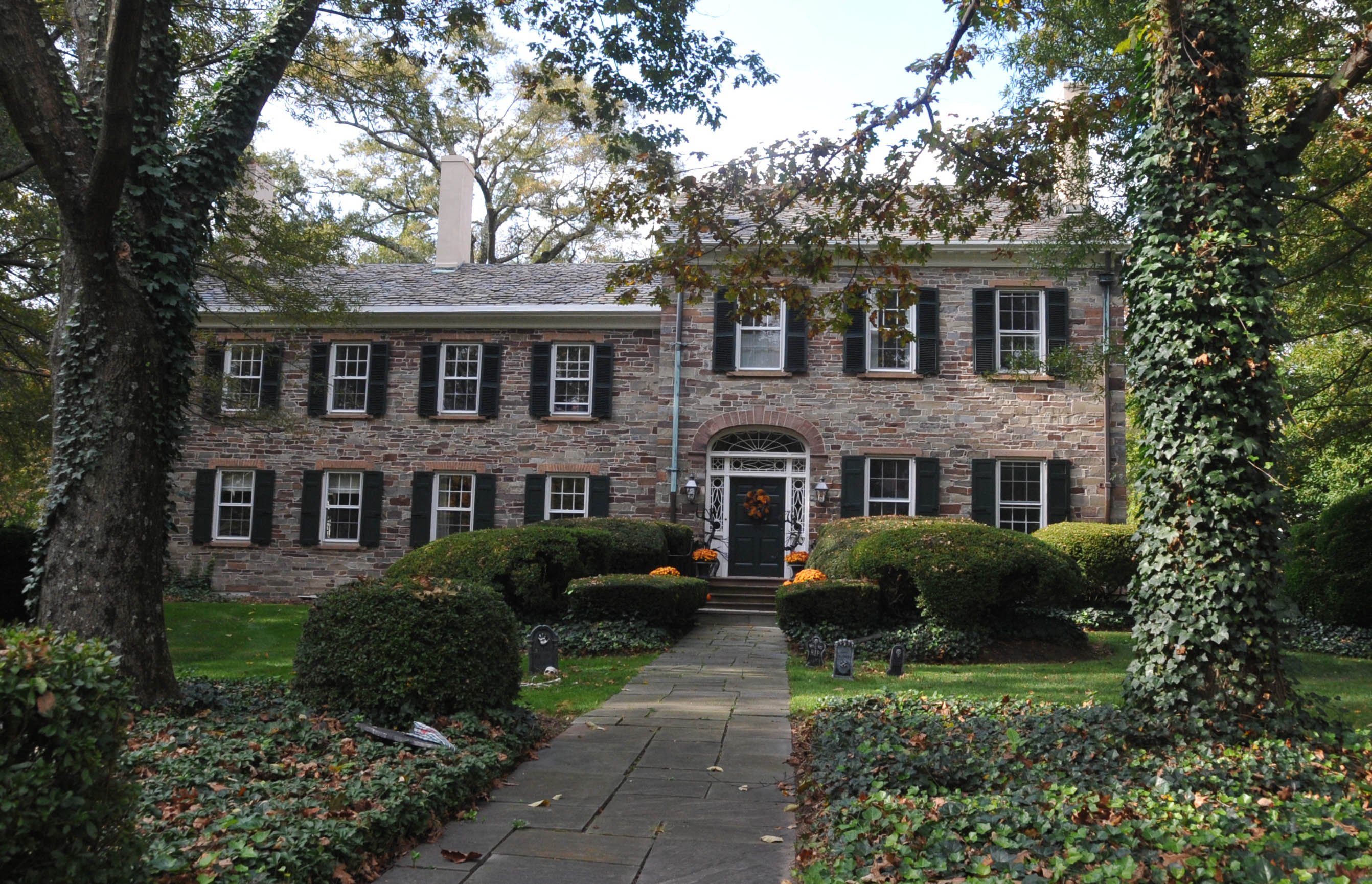
Theophilus Phillips House

== Transportation ==
=== Roads and highways ===
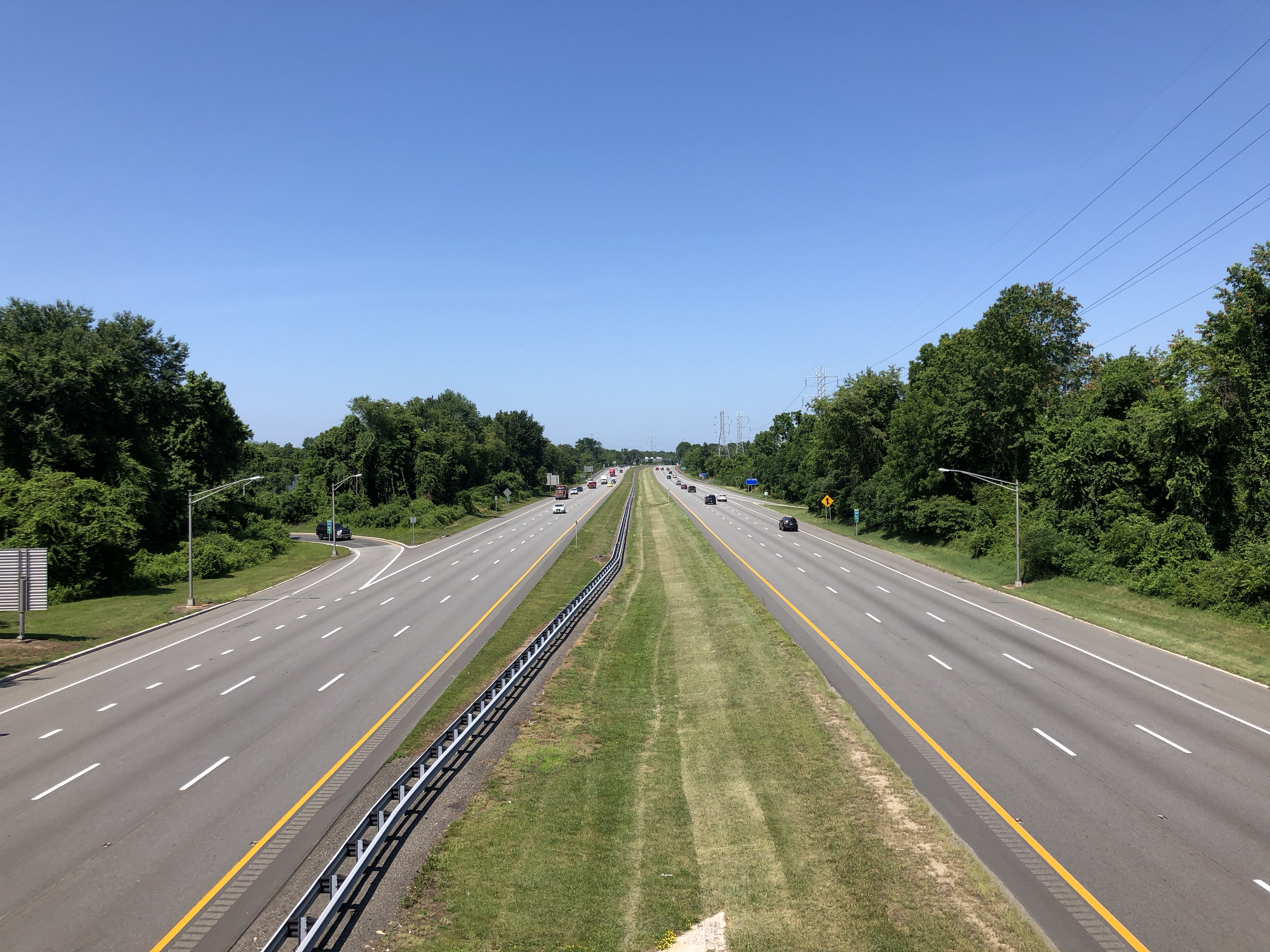
View north along Interstate 295 past U.S. Route 206 in Lawrence Township

As of May 2010, the township had a total of 132.33 miles (212.96 km) of roadways, of which 102.37 miles (164.75 km) were maintained by the municipality, 11.48 miles (18.48 km) by Mercer County and 18.48 miles (29.74 km) by the New Jersey Department of Transportation.

Several major transportation routes traverse the Township. Interstate 295 runs through as a semicircle while U.S. Route 1, the other major highway, bisects the municipality. U.S. 1 is in effect three different roads: the original route from Trenton to New Brunswick in the southern half of the Township, the limited access Trenton Freeway, and the combined road in the northern half that serves as a regional arterial linking the Interstates with New Brunswick and Route 18.

U.S. Route 206 (Lawrence Road) is the main artery within the township itself, running from Trenton to Princeton roughly north-to-south. It is a segment of the historic Lincoln Highway, and before that, it was part of the main New York-Philadelphia Post road in the decades after the Revolutionary War. Major county routes that pass through include County Route 533, County Route 546 and County Route 569.

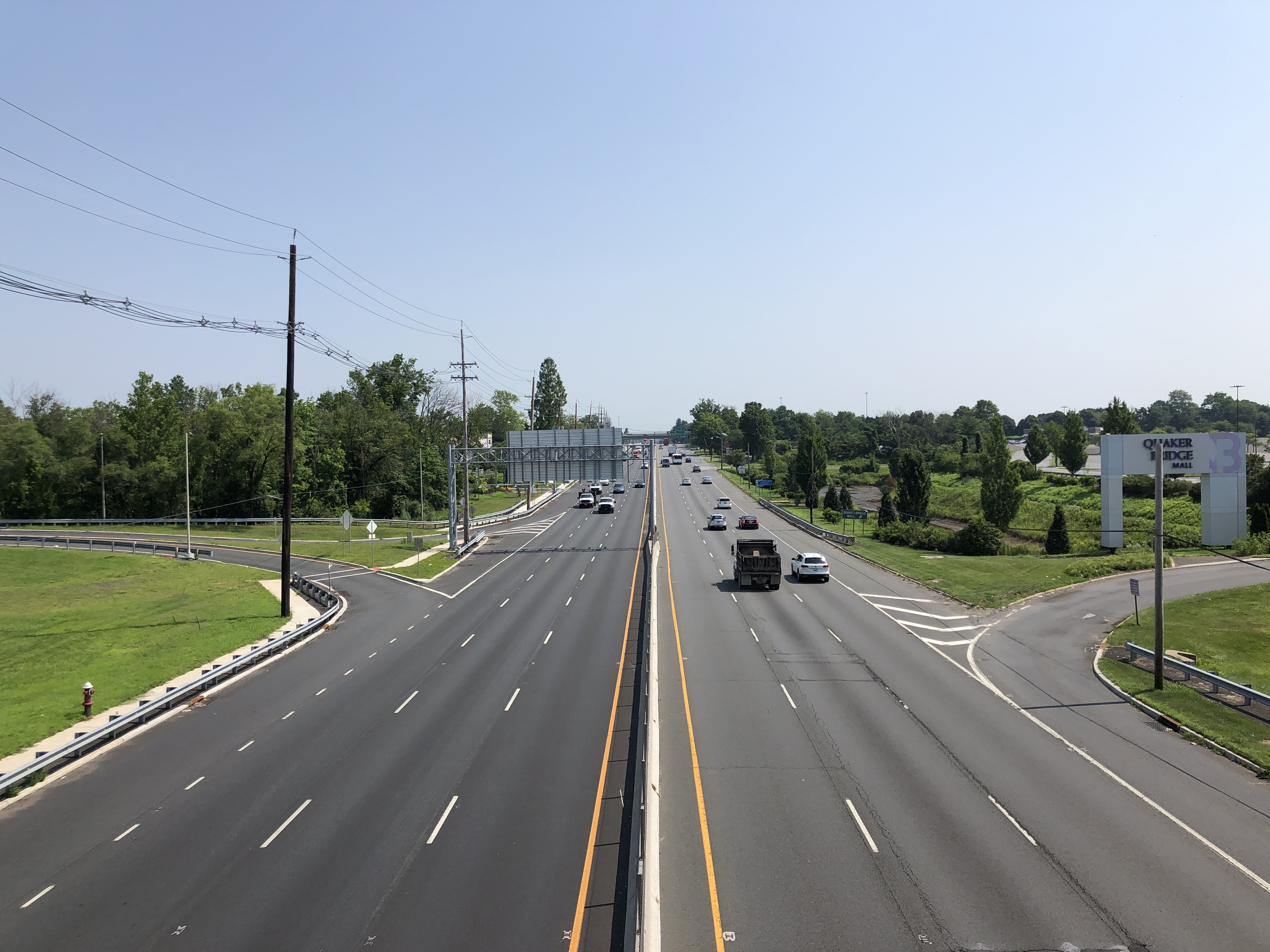
View north along U.S. Route 1 at the Quaker Bridge Mall in Lawrence Township.

Lawrence Township had been the site of what was called the "abrupt ending" of Interstate 95. This was a result from politics in Somerset County that eliminated a planned connection of the Somerset Freeway to Interstate 287. Originally, when drivers travelled along I-95 north while approaching the interchange for U.S. Route 1, the 95 designation abruptly ended and the highway turned southward and became Interstate 295. Drivers wishing to continue north were required to use an alternate route, either by taking US 1 north, or continue along Interstate 295 south to Interstate 195 east and to the New Jersey Turnpike (Interstate 95) at Exit 7A in Robbinsville Township. This portion of interstate (between the Hopewell Township border and U.S. 1) was renumbered from I-95 to I-295 in May 2018.

=== Public transportation ===
The busy Northeast Corridor rail line, carrying Amtrak and NJ Transit trains, runs along the eastern edge of the township. The nearest stations are in Hamilton, Trenton, Princeton and Princeton Junction.

NJ Transit provides bus service to Trenton on the 600, 603, 605, 606, 609 and 613 routes, and local service on route 612.

A rail spur used to run to Lawrenceville from Trenton, but was discontinued in the 1970s and is now a bicycle trail. From Lawrenceville, a trolley line to Princeton existed from 1900 to 1941, but was dismantled before World War II, and the right-of-way largely has reverted to neighboring landowners.

The nearest commercial airport is Trenton-Mercer Airport, formerly known as the Mercer County Airport, in Ewing Township with nonstop service to 10 major cities in the eastern half of the United States. Lawrence Township is roughly equidistant to the other two nearby commercial airports, Philadelphia International Airport and Newark Liberty International Airport.

== Points of interest ==
The Port Mercer Canal House is located at 4378 Quakerbridge Road, along the Delaware and Raritan Canal near the border of West Windsor and Princeton. The house was built in the 1830s as housing for the bridge tender and his family. The bridge tender was needed to open the swing bridge when canal boats came through, then close it to allow traffic to cross over the canal.

The Delaware and Raritan Canal has an intact walking towpath for most of its length. Additional walking trail areas in the township include Shipetaukin Woods, Carson Road Woods, and part of Rosedale Park. Lawrence Township is part of the Lawrence Hopewell Trail, currently under development.

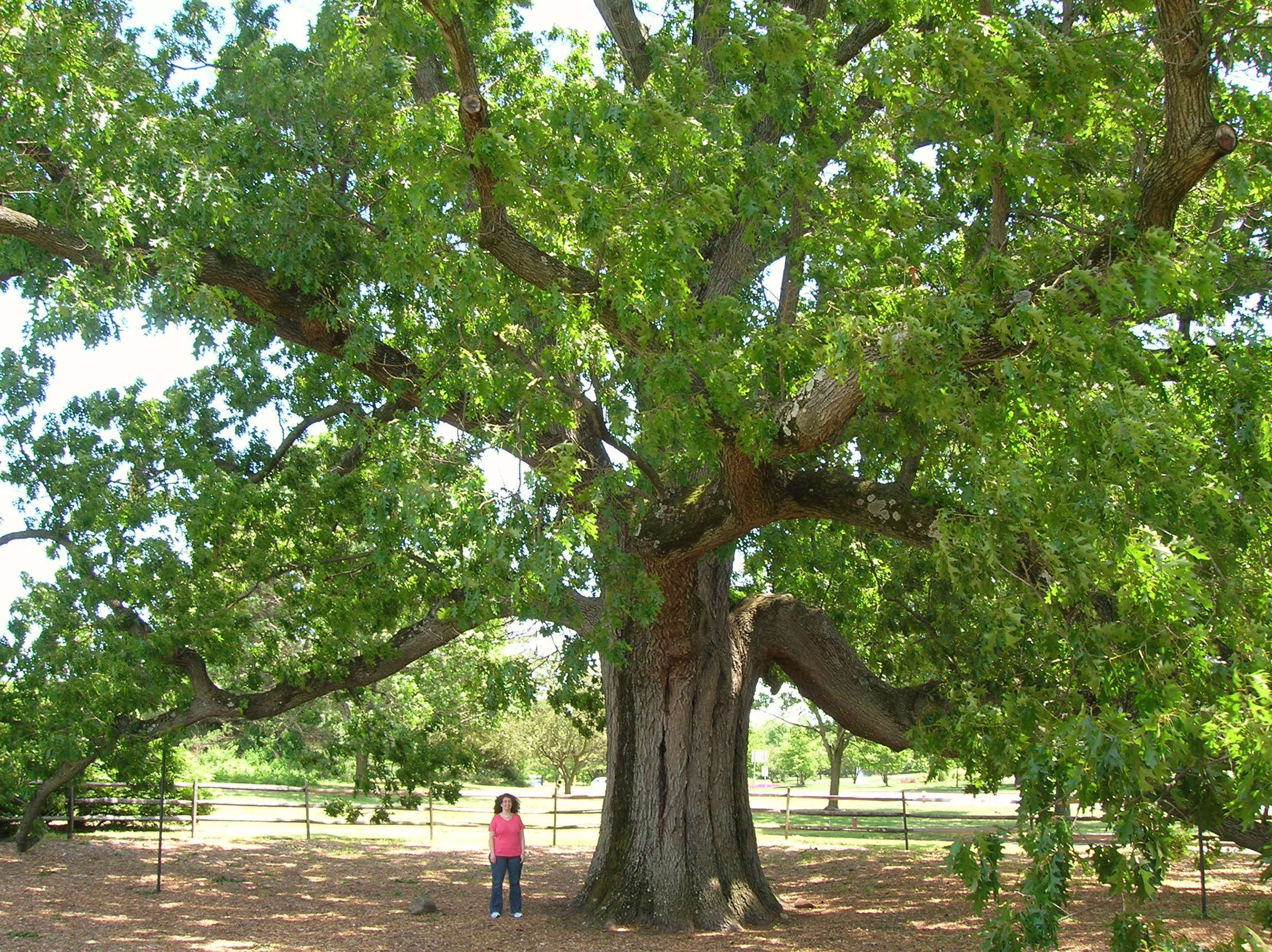
Brearley Oak (May 2013)

Jasna Polana was the home of John Seward Johnson I of Johnson & Johnson. His widow converted it into Tournament Players Club at Jasna Polana golf course.

Terhune Orchards is a winery and produce farm.

Colonial Lake, a man-made lake covering 25 acres (10 ha), is the centerpiece of the township's Colonial Lake Park.

The Brearley Oak, the largest Black Oak tree in New Jersey, is located along the Princeton Pike.

== Climate ==
According to the Köppen climate classification system, Lawrence Township has a Hot-summer Humid continental climate (Dfa).

Climate data for Lawrence Twp (40.2954, -74.7205), 1991-2020 normals, extremes 1981-2024
Month	Jan	Feb	Mar	Apr	May	Jun	Jul	Aug	Sep	Oct	Nov	Dec	Year
Record high °F (°C)	71.5 (21.9)	77.6 (25.3)	88.1 (31.2)	95.2 (35.1)	95.5 (35.3)	98.1 (36.7)	102.9 (39.4)	100.4 (38.0)	97.5 (36.4)	93.6 (34.2)	80.6 (27.0)	75.4 (24.1)	102.9 (39.4)
Mean daily maximum °F (°C)	40.3 (4.6)	42.9 (6.1)	50.7 (10.4)	63.0 (17.2)	72.5 (22.5)	81.7 (27.6)	86.3 (30.2)	84.6 (29.2)	78.1 (25.6)	66.1 (18.9)	55.4 (13.0)	45.2 (7.3)	64.0 (17.8)
Daily mean °F (°C)	31.9 (−0.1)	33.9 (1.1)	41.3 (5.2)	52.3 (11.3)	61.9 (16.6)	71.1 (21.7)	76.1 (24.5)	74.3 (23.5)	67.5 (19.7)	55.7 (13.2)	45.5 (7.5)	36.9 (2.7)	54.1 (12.3)
Mean daily minimum °F (°C)	23.4 (−4.8)	24.9 (−3.9)	31.8 (−0.1)	41.7 (5.4)	51.4 (10.8)	60.5 (15.8)	65.9 (18.8)	64.0 (17.8)	57.0 (13.9)	45.3 (7.4)	35.5 (1.9)	28.6 (−1.9)	44.3 (6.8)
Record low °F (°C)	−9.8 (−23.2)	−1.7 (−18.7)	5.2 (−14.9)	17.9 (−7.8)	32.6 (0.3)	42.3 (5.7)	48.5 (9.2)	42.3 (5.7)	36.7 (2.6)	24.9 (−3.9)	11.0 (−11.7)	0.0 (−17.8)	−9.8 (−23.2)
Average precipitation inches (mm)	3.57 (91)	2.79 (71)	4.25 (108)	3.69 (94)	4.06 (103)	4.49 (114)	4.93 (125)	4.45 (113)	4.19 (106)	4.14 (105)	3.34 (85)	4.40 (112)	48.31 (1,227)
Average snowfall inches (cm)	8.1 (21)	8.3 (21)	3.7 (9.4)	0.1 (0.25)	0.0 (0.0)	0.0 (0.0)	0.0 (0.0)	0.0 (0.0)	0.0 (0.0)	0.2 (0.51)	0.6 (1.5)	3.5 (8.9)	24.4 (62)
Average dew point °F (°C)	21.6 (−5.8)	22.3 (−5.4)	27.8 (−2.3)	37.3 (2.9)	49.2 (9.6)	59.4 (15.2)	64.2 (17.9)	63.5 (17.5)	57.6 (14.2)	46.0 (7.8)	34.9 (1.6)	27.4 (−2.6)	42.7 (5.9)
Source 1: PRISM
Source 2: NOHRSC (Snow, 2008/2009 - 2024/2025 normals)

== Ecology ==
According to the A. W. Kuchler U.S. potential natural vegetation types, Lawrence Township would have a dominant vegetation type of Appalachian Oak (104) with a dominant vegetation form of Eastern Hardwood Forest (25).

== Notable people ==
People who were born in, residents of, or otherwise closely associated with Lawrence Township include:

- Kevin Bannon (born 1957), former men's college basketball head coach who was the Rutgers Scarlet Knights men's basketball team's head coach from 1997 through 2001
- Ifa Bayeza (born Wanda Williams), playwright, producer and conceptual theater artist
- Brett Brackett (born 1987), tight end who played in the NFL
- David Brearley (1745–1790), signer of the United States Constitution and Chief Justice of the New Jersey Supreme Court from 1779 to 1789
- George H. Brown (1810–1865), represented New Jersey's 4th congressional district in the United States House of Representatives from 1853 to 1855
- Scott Brunner (born 1957), football quarterback in the NFL who played for the New York Giants from 1980 to 1983
- Mark Carlson (born 1969), President, Head Coach and General Manager of the Cedar Rapids RoughRiders
- Richard J. Coffee (1925–2017), former member of the New Jersey Senate
- Cason Crane (born 1992), entrepreneur and endurance athlete who became the first openly gay mountaineer to scale the Seven Summits
- David W. Crane (born 1959), lawyer, investment banker and business executive in the energy industry, who has served as the Undersecretary for Infrastructure in the United States Department of Energy
- Oliver Crane (born 1998), rower, who set the record as the youngest person to row solo across the Atlantic Ocean, when he completed the 3,000-nautical-mile (5,600 km; 3,500 mi) journey in 2018
- Margery Cuyler (born 1948), children's book author
- Tony DeNicola (1927–2006), jazz drummer
- Luke Elliot (born 1984), singer-songwriter and composer
- Marc Ferzan, director of the New Jersey Governor's Office of Recovery and Rebuilding following Hurricane Sandy
- N. Howell Furman (1892–1965), professor of analytical chemistry who helped develop the electrochemical uranium separation process as part of the Manhattan Project
- John Cleve Green (1800–1875), merchant who was a benefactor of the Lawrenceville School and Princeton University
- Diane Gutierrez-Scaccetti, former executive director of the New Jersey Turnpike Authority and Florida's Turnpike Enterprise, who is Commissioner of the New Jersey Department of Transportation
- Kenneth W. Keuffel (1923 –2006), American football coach who was the 25th head football coach of the Wabash Little Giants football team
- Frederick Kroesen (1923–2020), United States Army four-star general
- Josue Lajeunesse, custodian at Princeton University and a taxi driver who was featured in the documentary The Philosopher Kings for his efforts raising money to provide clean water to his native town of Lasource, Haiti
- Dan Lavery (born 1969), musician who has performed as part of The Fray and Tonic
- Wesley Leggett (born 2001), soccer player who plays as a forward for the USL Championship club Loudoun United FC
- James T.C. Liu (1919–1993), Chinese historian and a leading scholar on Song dynasty history who was a professor at Princeton University for more than two decades
- Amy Locane, actress known for her role in John Waters' 1990 musical comedy Cry-Baby
- Thorn Lord (1906–1965), politician
- David S. Mao, law librarian and acting Librarian of Congress from 2015 to 2016
- Donald W. McGowan (1899–1967), Major General and Chief of the National Guard Bureau
- Kenneth Merin (born 1947), politician and lawyer who served two stints as the New Jersey Commissioner of Insurance
- Ed Moran (born 1981), retired track and road runner who was a gold medalist in the 5000-meter race at the 2007 Pan American Games and finished the 2011 New York City Marathon in 10th place
- Paul Mott (born 1958), retired professional soccer player for the Tampa Bay Rowdies, who was a sports consultant and former professional sports executive
- Jake Nerwinski (born 1994), Major League Soccer player for the Vancouver Whitecaps
- Eve Riskin, electrical engineer and academic administrator
- John Schneider (born 1980), professional baseball coach for the Toronto Blue Jays
- Norman Schwarzkopf Jr. (1934–2012), retired United States Army General who was commander of the Coalition Forces in the Gulf War of 1991
- Norman Schwarzkopf Sr. (1895–1958), first superintendent of the New Jersey State Police
- Ntozake Shange (1948–2018), playwright and poet best known for the Obie Award-winning play for colored girls who have considered suicide / when the rainbow is enuf
- Elizabeth Socolow (born 1940), poet
- Jon Solomon (born 1973), DJ on WPRB
- Myles Stephens (born 1997), basketball player for Kangoeroes Mechelen
- Jon Stewart (born 1962), of The Daily Show
- Shirley Turner (born 1941), New Jersey State Senator
