= Slackwood, New Jersey =

Populated place in Mercer County, New Jersey, US

- Unincorporated community
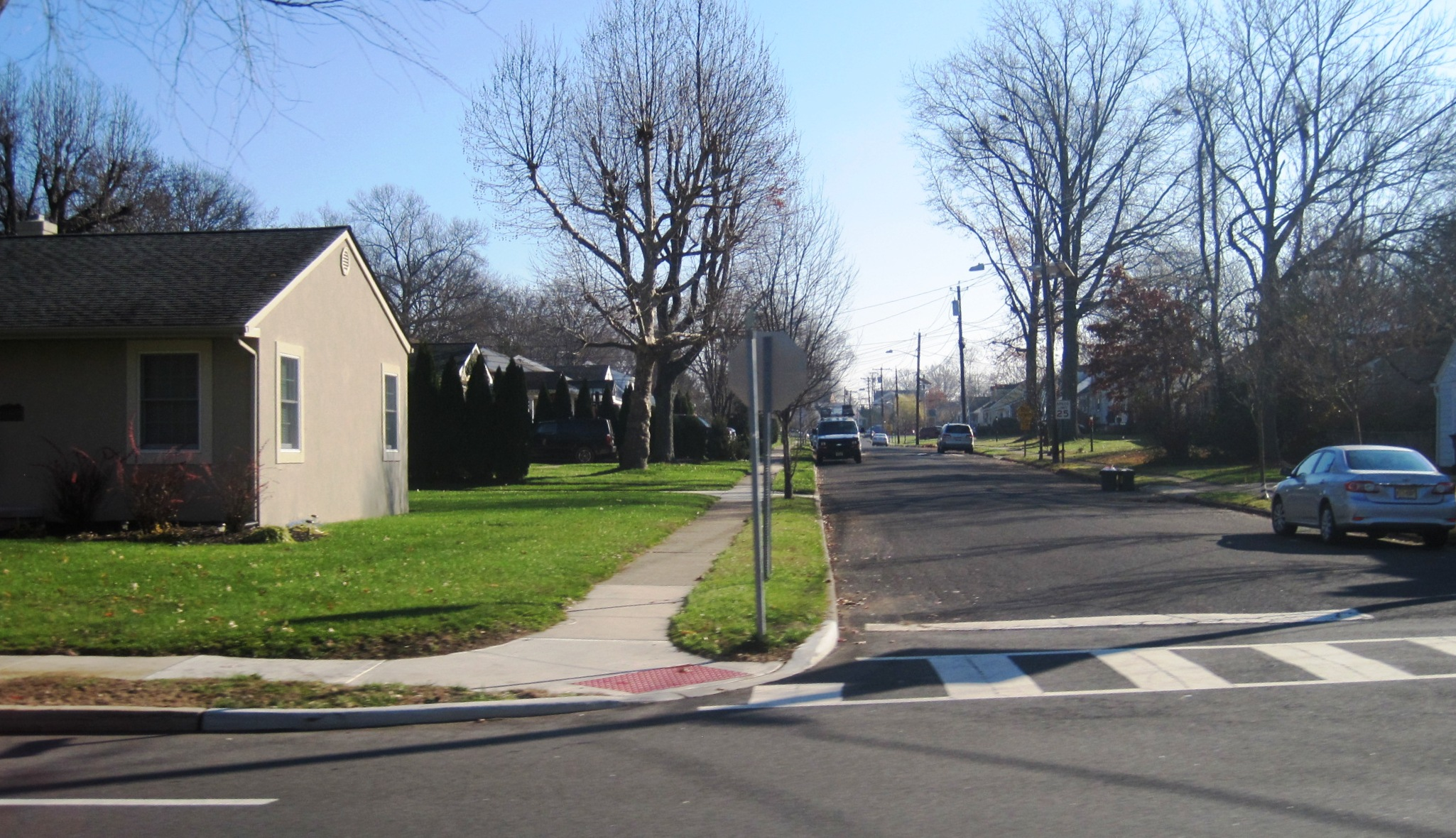
- Looking down Harmony Avenue from Princeton Pike (CR 583)

- Location within Mercer County, New Jersey Location within New Jersey Location within the United States
- Coordinates: 40°15′11″N 74°44′05″W
- Country: United States
- State: New Jersey
- County: Mercer
- Township: Lawrence
- Named for: Joseph Slack, William Wood
- Elevation: 89 ft (27 m)
- GNIS feature ID: 880639

Slackwood is an unincorporated community located within Lawrence Township in Mercer County, in the U.S. state of New Jersey. The area is named for the owners of the land that was subdivided into the neighborhood today, Joseph Slack and William Wood. The neighborhood was first developed in 1890 as the first suburban development in the reconfigured Lawrence Township (a portion of the township had seceded in the 1880s to form Millham Township, now part of the City of Trenton). Its location between Princeton Pike (now County Route 583) and Brunswick Pike (U.S. Route 1 Business) allowed for an easy walk to nearby Trenton factories. Today, most of the homes in Slackwood are still small bungalows with some businesses along with Princeton and Brunswick Pikes. The neighborhood is bounded by the two highways on the northwest and southeast, Slackwood Park and forest on the southwest, and Shabakunk Creek and Park on the northeast.
