= Princessville, New Jersey =

Populated place in Mercer County, New Jersey, US

- Unincorporated community
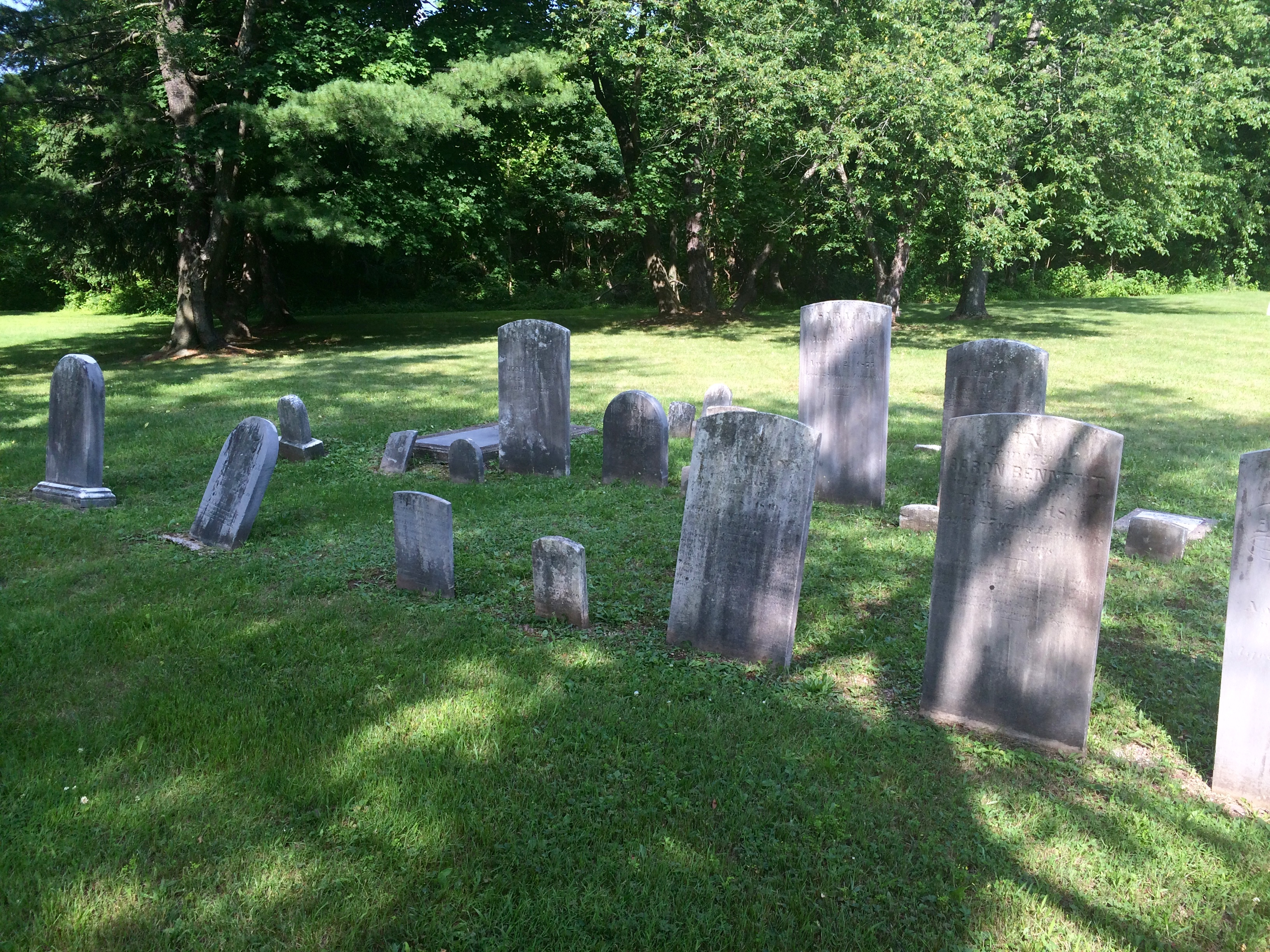
- The Princessville Cemetery, with graves dating from 1843-1921

- Location within Mercer County, New Jersey Location within New Jersey Location within the United States
- Coordinates: 40°17′33″N 74°42′28″W
- Country: United States
- State: New Jersey
- County: Mercer
- Township: Lawrence
- Elevation: 82 ft (25 m)
- GNIS feature ID: 879489

Princessville is an unincorporated community located within Lawrence Township in Mercer County, in the U.S. state of New Jersey. It was home to the Colonial era Princessville Inn, formerly listed on the National Register of Historic Places, which burned down in 1982. A cemetery still exists on Princeton Pike that dates to 1843 when the inn donated land for a Methodist Episcopal congregation. The church relocated in 1890 and was replaced by one built by local African-American families, which was destroyed by a hurricane in 1950. The Baker-Brearley House, a National Register of Historic Places listed home that houses the Lawrence Historical Society, is located down Meadow Road past the cemetery. The area immediately to the south is occupied by a corporate office park adjacent to the interchange between Princeton Pike and Interstate 295. The area to the north is largely rural.
