= Top Road, Trenton, New Jersey =

Populated place in Mercer County, New Jersey, US

Top Road
- Neighborhood of Trenton
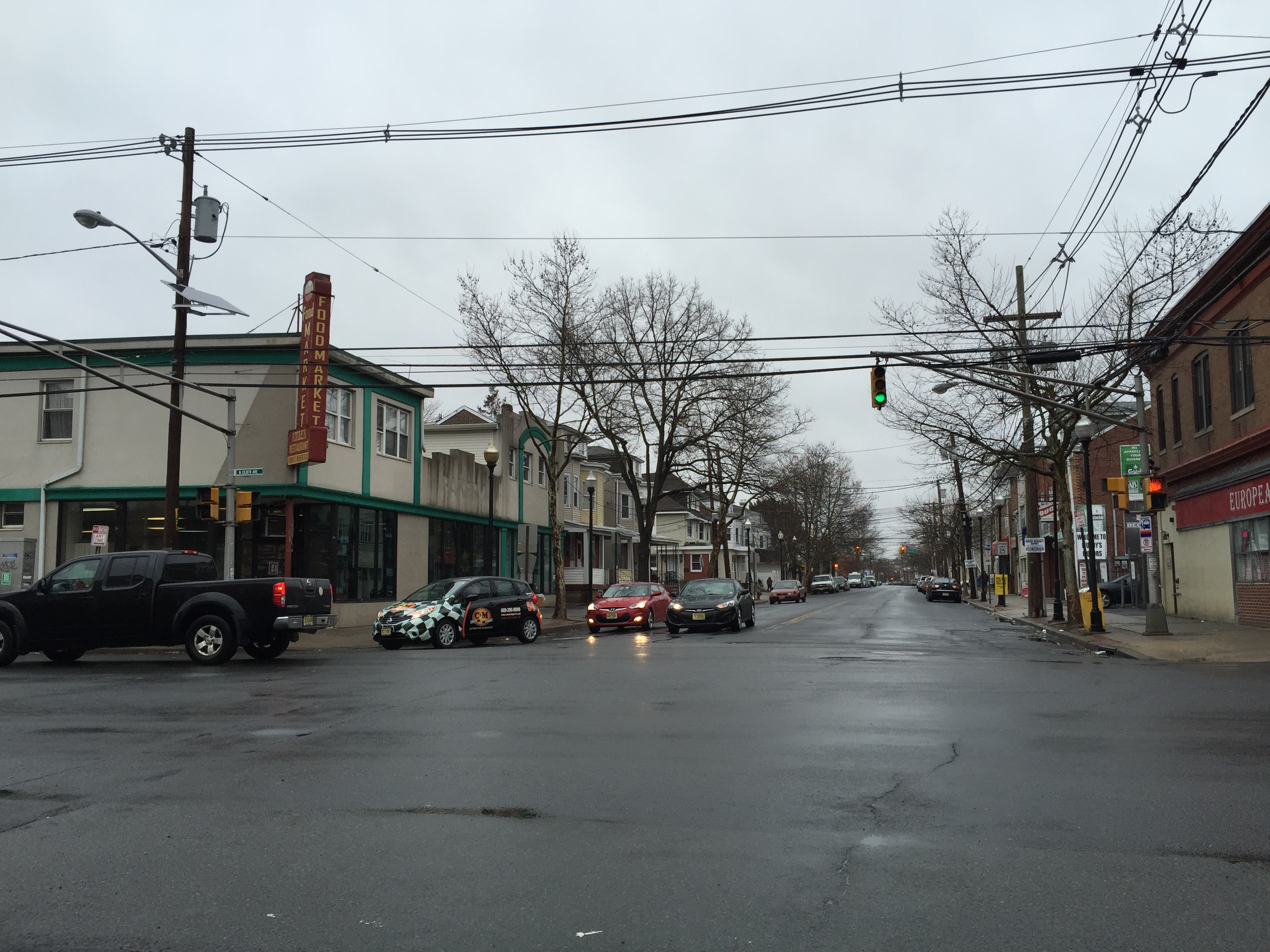
- View north along Brunswick Avenue (U.S. Route 206) at Olden Avenue in Top Road

- Location of Top Road in Mercer County Inset: Location of county within the state of New Jersey Top Road (New Jersey) Top Road (the United States)
- Coordinates: 40°14′26″N 74°44′38″W
- Country: United States
- State: New Jersey
- County: Mercer
- City: Trenton

Top Road is a neighborhood located within the city of Trenton in Mercer County, in the U.S. state of New Jersey. Much of Top Road was once part of Lawrence Township and then was added to the now-defunct Millham Township before being annexed by Trenton in 1888.

== Demographics ==
=== 2010 census ===
The United States Census Bureau estimates that the population of Top Road was 3,008 as of the 2010 United States census. The population density was 9,490/sq mi.

Top Road is an ethnically diverse neighborhood of Trenton. As of the 2010 United States census, 44.5% of the population was foreign-born. Poland was the top country of origin, representing 35.7% of all foreign-born residents in Top Road. The Dominican Republic was the second-most common country of origin with 18% of the total; Costa Rica, Mexico, and Guatemala followed with 9.3%, 6.6%, and 5.8% respectively. India was the top country of origin outside of Europe and the Americas, representing 5% of the foreign-born population.

Spanish and Polish were the top two languages spoken at home. Spanish was spoken at home by 30.4% of residents, while 15.3% spoke Polish at home.
