= LHT =

LHT may refer to:

- López Hermanos Toledo, a hardware store located in Toledo, Spain.
- Lufthansa Technik, a subsidiary of the Lufthansa Group
- Left-hand traffic, in the context of right- and left-hand traffic
- Lawrence Hopewell Trail, a multi-use trail in New Jersey
- Laurel Hill Tunnel, an abandoned Pennsylvania Turnpike tunnel
- Lincoln Heritage Trail, a designated highway route in the United States
- Lwoff-Horne-Tournier, a method of virus classification
- Life history theory
