= Eldridge Park, New Jersey =

Populated place in Mercer County, New Jersey, US

- Unincorporated community
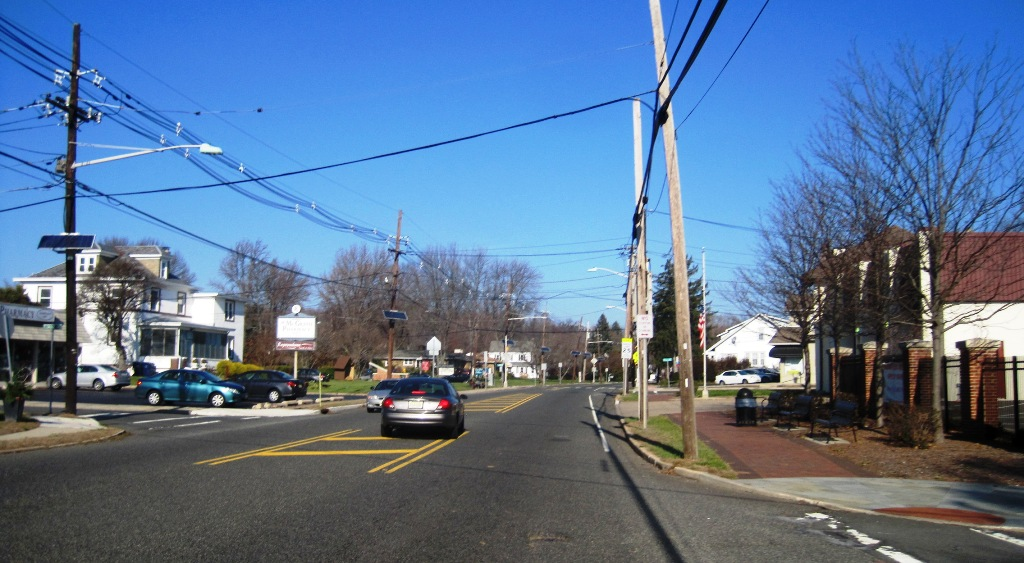
- At the intersection of US 206 and Marlboro Road

- Location within Mercer County, New Jersey Location within New Jersey Location within the United States
- Coordinates: 40°15′55″N 74°44′42″W
- Country: United States
- State: New Jersey
- County: Mercer
- Township: Lawrence
- Elevation: 98 ft (30 m)
- GNIS feature ID: 876142

Eldridge Park is an unincorporated community located within Lawrence Township in Mercer County, in the U.S. state of New Jersey. The neighborhood is named for Stephen Eldridge, a farm owner in the township in the early 20th century. The neighborhood itself was established in 1906 as a settlement along the Trenton & Princeton Traction Company trolleyline and Lawrence Road (U.S. Route 206) for European immigrants to purchase small houses in the suburbs of Trenton. The growing population led to the construction of the Eldridge Park Elementary School and St. Ann's, the township's first Roman Catholic church. As it was in the past, the area is mostly made up of small houses with businesses clustered around US 206.
