= Israel Stevens House =

- U.S. National Register of Historic Places
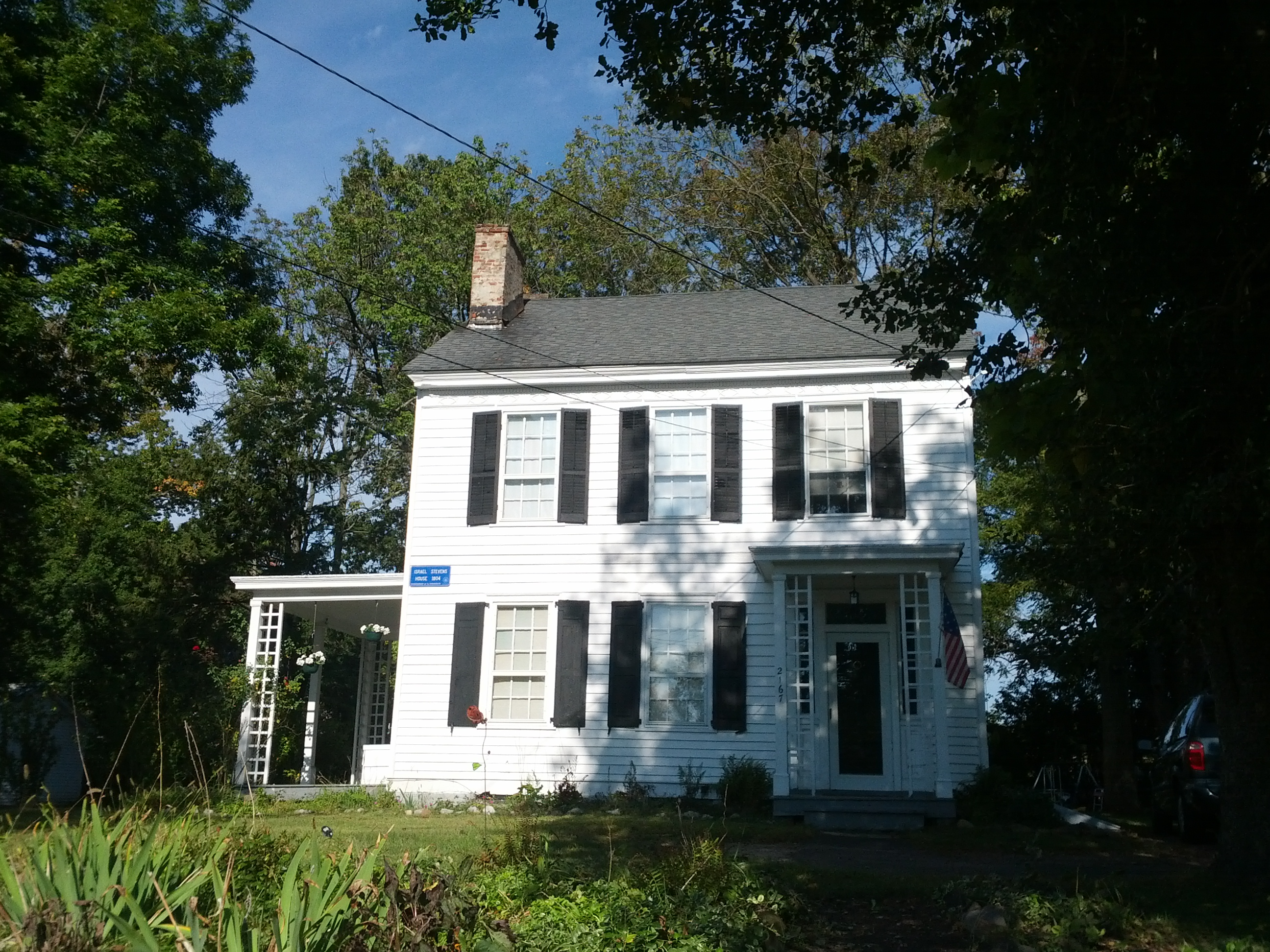

- Location within Mercer County, New Jersey Location within New Jersey Location within the United States
- Location: 2167 Brunswick Pike, Lawrence Township, NJ
- Coordinates: 40°15′13″N 74°43′57.2″W
- Built: by 1804
- NRHP reference No.: 05000176
- Added to NRHP: March 15, 2005

The Israel Stevens House is a private home in Lawrence Township, Mercer County, New Jersey. It was added to the National Register of Historic Places in 2005.

== See also ==
- National Register of Historic Places listings in Mercer County, New Jersey
