= Anderson–Capner House =

Historic house in New Jersey, United States

- U.S. National Register of Historic Places
- New Jersey Register of Historic Places
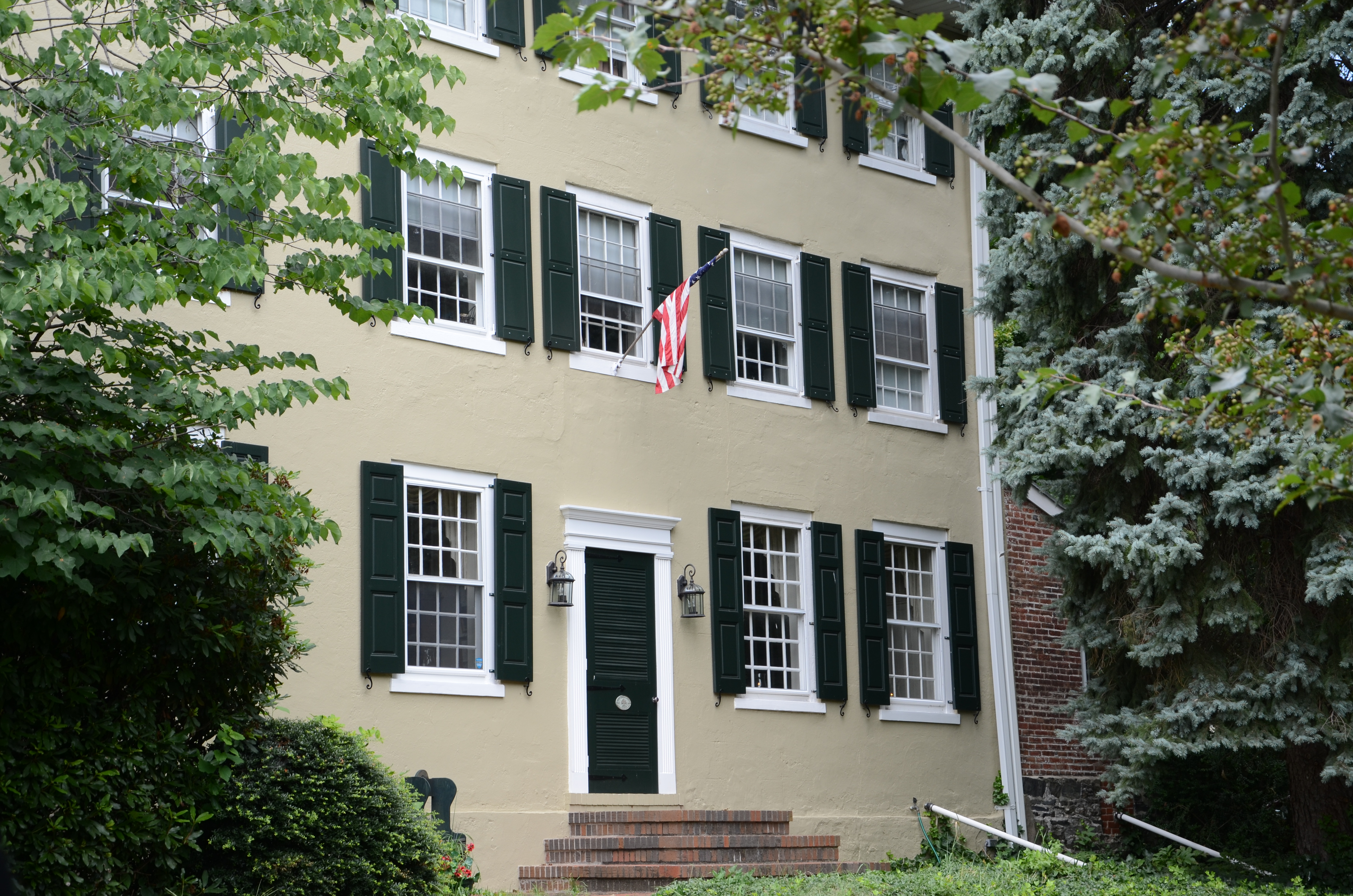

- Location within Mercer County, New Jersey Location within New Jersey Location within the United States
- Location: 700 Trumbull Avenue, Lawrence, New Jersey
- Coordinates: 40°14′51.9″N 74°44′05.7″W
- Built: 1764
- Architectural style: Georgian
- NRHP reference No.: 73001107
- NJRHP No.: 1709

Significant dates
- Added to NRHP: April 3, 1973
- Designated NJRHP: August 7, 1972

The Anderson–Capner House is located at 700 Trumbull Avenue in Lawrence Township, New Jersey. Constructed in 1764, it is the last remaining pre-revolutionary building and farm house in the southern part of the township. Thomas Capner purchased the house in 1829 and introduced new scientific methods of farming to the area. It was listed on the National Register of Historic Places in 1973.

== See also ==
- National Register of Historic Places listings in Mercer County, New Jersey
