= Lawrence Hopewell Trail =

- Length: 18.7 mi (30.1 km)
- Location: Mercer County, New Jersey
- Trailheads: Loop Trail with multiple access points
- Use: Hiking, Cycling
- Difficulty: Easy
- Season: Year round
- Surface: Asphalt, Crushed Stone, Grass, Dirt, Concrete
- Website: lhtrail.org

The Lawrence Hopewell Trail (LHT) is a multi-use trail founded in 2002. The trail runs through Lawrence and Hopewell Townships in Mercer County, New Jersey and offers safe, off-road access for kids, families, bicyclists, joggers, hikers and commuters who want to enjoy the great outdoors. The LHT is a member of the Circuit Trails, a 750-mile network of bicycle and pedestrian trails connecting people to jobs, communities, and parks in the Greater Philadelphia Region. It also connects to the D&R Canal towpath running through Mercer County and ultimately from Maine to Florida.

The current developed length of the trail open to the public is 18.7 miles (30.1 km) with a remaining distance of 3.3 miles (5.3 km). The planned final length of the LHT is 22 miles (35 km). The LHT's board of trustees has voted to begin exploring possible connections with contiguous towns in Mercer County. Once the main circuit is complete, more connections to the trail are possible. The Lawrence Hopewell Trail is not a rail-trail but is classified as a greenway by the Rails-to-Trails Conservancy and as such it does not reuse any existing railroad right-of-way. Much of the trail traverses public properties such as parks, sidewalks and roadway as well as private properties via agreement, including the Bristol-Myers Squibb Hopewell & Lawrenceville campuses, the Educational Testing Service corporation property, and The Lawrenceville School campus.

== Trail heads ==
The Lawrence Hopewell Trail forms a loop so there are no terminating trail heads; rather, there are multiple access points along its path. The trail's website lists 24 individual trail sections with their access, surface, status and location. The following sections list nearby parking for trail access:

- Brearley House Connector - At the junction with the D&R Canal Towpath
- Brandywine-Princeton Pike Corporate Center
- The Lawrenceville School campus
- Lawrenceville Village Park
- Mercer Meadows County Park
- Educational Testing Service (ETS)
