= Millham Township, New Jersey =

Former settlement in New Jersey

Coordinates: 40.265°N 74.757°W

Millham was a township that existed in Mercer County, New Jersey, United States, from 1882 to 1888.

Millham was incorporated as a township by an Act of the New Jersey Legislature on February 10, 1882, from portions of Lawrence Township. The area had developed as a suburb of Trenton through the 1860s and 1870s and as such had developed into a community separately from Lawrence Township. Even at its creation, some within the town foresaw its annexation by Trenton. This came to pass on March 30, 1888, and the land has been part of Trenton ever since. The Top Road and East Trenton sections of the city represent the former township.
