= HindiUSA =

- Founded: 01-March-2001
- Founder: Rachita Singh and Devendra Singh
- Type: Non-profit
- Tax ID no.: 74-3157325
- Purpose: Hindi language introduction and education
- Region served: Northeast US
- Website: http://www.HindiUSA.org/

- Students: 4000

HindiUSA is a non-profit and entirely volunteer-managed organization in the United States. With more than 4000 members, it is one of the largest Hindi volunteer groups in America. HindiUSA has a total of 26 schools, with 15 in New Jersey, four in Connecticut, and one each in Maryland and Massachusetts. HindiUSA also has an online school that covers all the cities of the United States where there is no in-person school.

== About ==
HindiUSA promotes Hindi language at the grassroots level by offering a broad spectrum of educational programs in the languages and cultures of India for students of all ages.

The program features nine levels from Starter-1 to Graduation at Advanced-2. The curriculum consists of well-established programs in Hindi and is delivered via a syllabus and books tailored for Indian-American children.

Since its inception, the organization has strived to develop a sense of cultural pride in the students by familiarizing them to the Indian arts, customs, language, and history, and keeping them abreast of current events. Adults volunteer on their own time to teach children of all ages about Hindi. The course is perfected for children of all age groups. A separate level is applied to each age group. This is comparable to the Chinese schools in America. The classes are held on Fridays.

Annually, HindiUSA also hosts several large events such as Hindi festivals, where students from each class perform in various activities that promote the usage of Hindi language among the youth. A Hindi poetry recitation competition called the Kavita Path Pratiyogita, is an example of such activities. Hindi Mahotsav is the largest Hindi annual event in North America, and is organized by HindiUSA in late May or early June. This festival has also been broadcast on TV Asia.

== Mission / objective ==
Over the last 17 years, the organization has been key in promoting the Indian culture and Hindi language to the many Indian-Americans whose ancestral roots lie in India. Apart from conducting classes, the organization has also been leading ongoing efforts with the local school districts to establish Hindi as a foreign language, much like Spanish, German, and French.

Since 2008, Hindi has been offered as an elective language in John P. Stevens High School and Edison High School in Edison, New Jersey thanks to the efforts of HindiUSA.

== History ==
HindiUSA's first school was started in 2001 by Devendra and Rachita Singh in New Jersey. Currently, there are 21 schools in four Northeastern U.S. states, with their largest school in Edison, New Jersey with over 500 students.
