= Baker–Brearley House =

- Brearley House
- U.S. National Register of Historic Places
- New Jersey Register of Historic Places
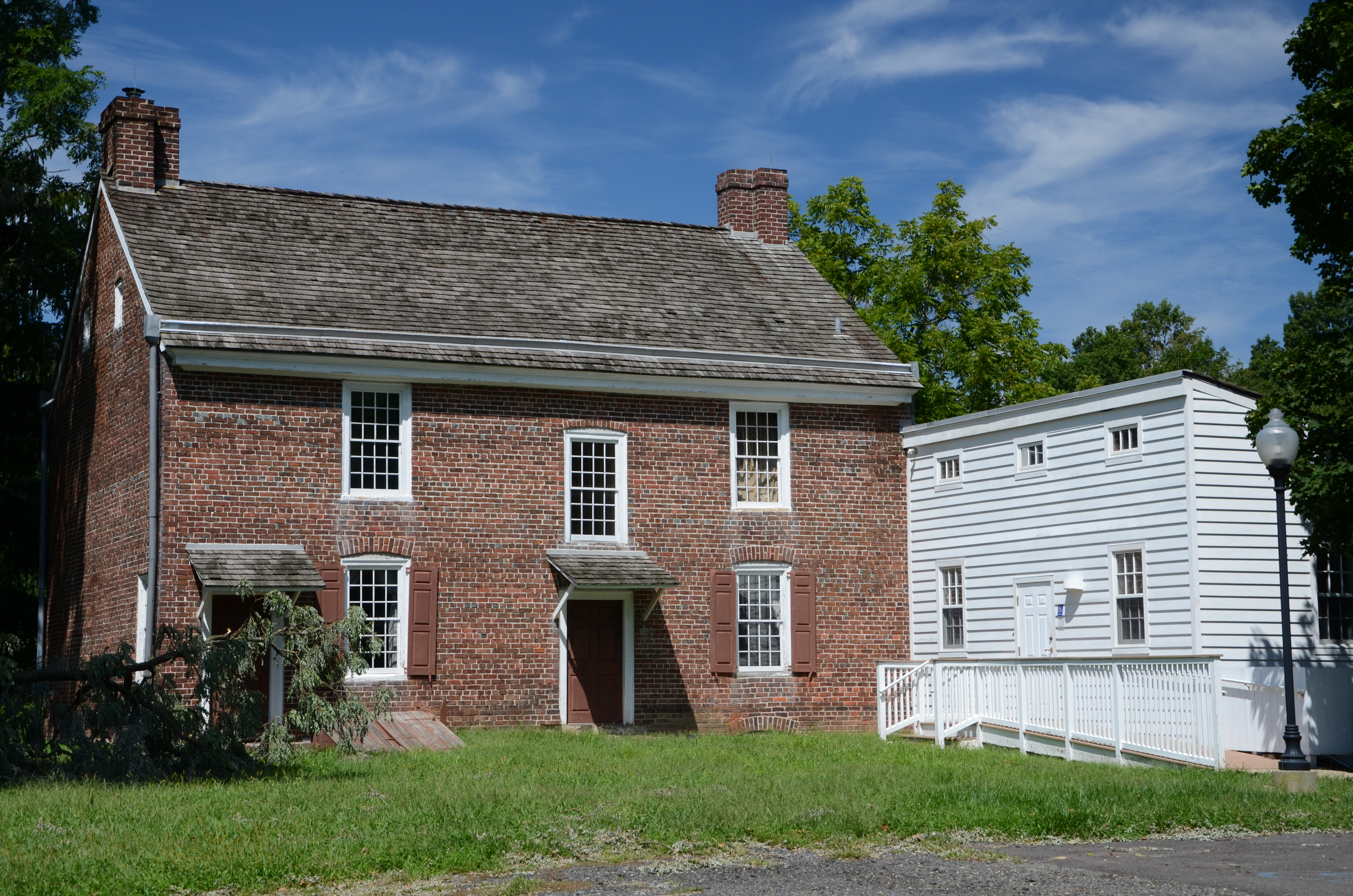

- Location within Mercer County, New Jersey Location within New Jersey Location within the United States
- Location: Meadow Road, Lawrenceville, New Jersey
- Coordinates: 40°17′33.0″N 74°42′02.9″W
- Area: 22.61 acres (9.15 ha)
- Built: 1761
- Architectural style: Georgian
- NRHP reference No.: 79001499
- NJRHP No.: 1712

Significant dates
- Added to NRHP: August 31, 1979
- Designated NJRHP: June 19, 1979

The Brearley House is a historic Georgian house built in 1761 in Lawrenceville, New Jersey. It was added to the National Register of Historic Places in 1979.

Lawrence Township, which owns the property, leased it to the Lawrence Historical Society in 2000.

== See also ==
- National Register of Historic Places listings in Mercer County, New Jersey
