= Wagner Seahawks men's basketball statistical leaders =

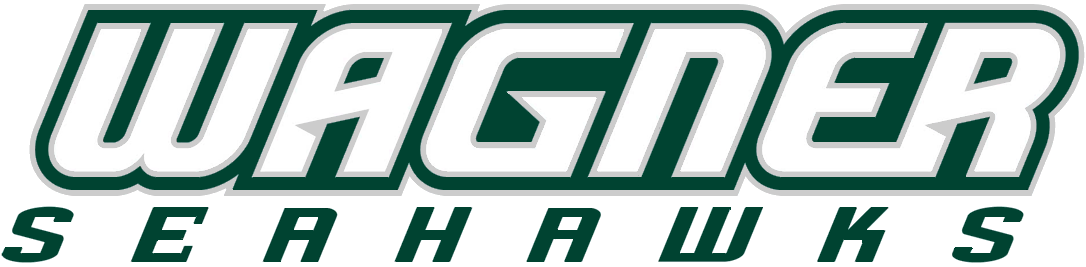

The Wagner Seahawks men's basketball statistical leaders are individual statistical leaders of the Wagner Seahawks men's basketball program in various categories, including points, assists, blocks, rebounds, and steals. Within those areas, the lists identify single-game, single-season, and career leaders. The Seahawks represent Wagner College in the NCAA's Northeast Conference.

Wagner began competing in intercollegiate basketball in 1920. However, the school's record book does not generally list records from before the 1950s, as records from before this period are often incomplete and inconsistent. Since scoring was much lower in this era, and teams played much fewer games during a typical season, it is likely that few or no players from this era would appear on these lists anyway.

The NCAA did not officially record assists as a stat until the 1983–84 season, and blocks and steals until the 1985–86 season, but Wagner's record books includes players in these stats before these seasons. These lists are updated through the end of the 2020–21 season.

== Scoring ==
Career
Rk	Player	Points	Seasons
1	Terrance Bailey	2591	1983–84 1984–85 1985–86 1986–87
2	Jermaine Hall	2278	1999–00 2000–01 2001–02 2002–03
3	Ray Hodge	1996	1967–68 1968–69 1969–70
4	Jamie Ciampaglio	1814	1976–77 1977–78 1978–79 1979–80 1980–81
5	Dean Borges	1660	1986–87 1987–88 1989–90 1990–91
6	Danny Seigle	1652	1994–95 1995–96 1996–97 1997–98
7	Mark Porter	1577	2004–05 2005–06 2006–07 2007–08
8	Bobby Hopson	1568	1990–91 1991–92 1992–93 1993–94
9	Milan Rikic	1549	1991–92 1992–93 1993–94 1994–95
10	Bob Bosley	1532	1950–51 1951–52 1952–53 1953–54

Season
Rk	Player	Points	Season
1	Terrance Bailey	854	1985–86
2	Terrance Bailey	788	1986–87
3	Ray Hodge	730	1968–69
4	Ray Hodge	686	1969–70
	Jermaine Hall	686	2002–03
6	Jermaine Hall	610	2001–02
7	Ray Hodge	580	1967–68
8	Russ Selger	573	1967–68
9	Bob Bosley	569	1952–53
10	Jamie Ciampaglio	561	1978–79

Single game
Rk	Player	Points	Season	Opponent
1	Terrance Bailey	49	1985–86	Brooklyn
	Ray Hodge	49	1969–70	Moravian
3	Ray Hodge	47	1969–70	Lycoming
4	Terrance Bailey	46	1985–86	Marist
5	Terrance Bailey	45	1986–87	Morehead St.
	Ray Hodge	45	1969–70	Hartwick
	Hank Pedro	45	1964–65	Washington
8	Bob Mahala Sr.	41	1956–57	Stevens Tech
9	Terrance Bailey	40	1986–87	LIU Brooklyn
	Curtis Cobb III	40	2019–20	Wesley

== Rebounds ==
Career
Rk	Player	Rebounds	Seasons
1	Charlie Harreus	1096	1951–52 1952–53 1953–54 1954–55
2	Oli Featherston	998	1966–67 1967–68 1968–69
3	Bob Mahala, Sr.	906	1950–51 1951–52 1955–56 1956–57
4	Durell Vinson	893	2003–04 2004–05 2005–06 2007–08
5	Fred Klittich	849	1961–62 1962–63 1963–64
6	Nigel Wyatte	833	2000–01 2001–02 2002–03 2003–04
7	Largest Agbejemisin	829	1983–84 1984–85 1985–86 1986–87
8	Ed Peterson	824	1952–53 1953–54 1954–55 1955–56
9	Frantz Pierre Louis	787	1994–95 1995–96 1996–97 1997–98 1998–99
10	Fred Blackwell	780	1956–57 1957–58 1958–59 1959–60

Season
Rk	Player	Rebounds	Season
1	Oli Featherston	382	1968–69
2	Durell Vinson	358	2007–08
3	Charlie Harreus	349	1951–52
4	Charles West	347	1955–56
5	Bob Mahala, Sr.	334	1955–56
6	Largest Agbejemisin	333	1986–87
7	Ed Peterson	330	1953–54
8	Dick Fiege	328	1966–67
9	Fred Klittich	321	1961–62
10	Tom Miller	319	1971–72

Single game
Rk	Player	Rebounds	Season	Opponent
1	Charles West	27	1956–57	Upsala
2	Earl Lewis	24	1977–78	New Haven
	Fred Klittich	24	1961–62	Wilkes
	Paul Bailey	24	1956–57	Gettysburg
5	Mike Aaman	23	2014–15	Fairleigh Dickinson
	Art Grannis	23	1964–65	Bridgeport
	Charles West	23	1955–56	Upsala
	Charles West	23	1955–56	Brooklyn
	Bob Mahala, Sr.	23	1955–56	Brooklyn
	Charles West	23	1954–55	CCNY
	Ed Peterson	23	1954–55	CCNY
	Ed Peterson	23	1954–55	Pratt

== Assists ==
Career
Rk	Player	Assists	Seasons
1	Henry Dillard	583	1975–76 1976–77 1977–78 1978–79
2	Courtney Pritchard	567	2000–01 2001–02 2002–03 2003–04
3	Andre Van Drost	560	1982–83 1983–84 1985–86 1986–87
4	Mark Porter	523	2004–05 2005–06 2006–07 2007–08
5	Arvie Powell	520	1979–80 1980–81 1981–82 1982–83
6	JoJo Cooper	511	2014–15 2015–16 2016–17 2017–18
7	Billy Kurisko	496	1987–88 1988–89 1989–90 1990–91
8	Tony Rice	455	1992–93 1993–94 1994–95 1995–96
9	Kenneth Ortiz	429	2011–12 2012–13 2013–14
10	Javier Ezquerra	398	2021–22 2022–23 2023–24 2024–25

Season
Rk	Player	Assists	Season
1	Henry Dillard	264	1977–78
2	Andre Van Drost	260	1986–87
3	Quincy Lewis	204	1992–93
4	JoJo Cooper	202	2017–18
5	Mick Wheeler	197	1997–98
6	Billy Kurisko	190	1989–90
7	Mark Porter	172	2007–08
8	Kenneth Ortiz	166	2012–13
9	Quincy Lewis	163	1991–92
10	Terrance Bailey	160	1984–85
	Dean Borges	160	1990–91

Single game
Rk	Player	Assists	Season	Opponent
1	Andre Van Drost	19	1986–87	LIU Brooklyn
2	Henry Dillard	18	1977–78	Delaware
3	Andre Van Drost	17	1986–87	Hofstra
4	Quincy Lewis	16	1992–93	Saint Francis U
	Andre Van Drost	16	1986–87	Saint Francis U
	Mick Wheeler	16	1997–98	Fairleigh Dickinson
7	Andre Van Drost	15	1986–87	Manhattan
	Terrance Bailey	15	1984–85	Pace
	Arvie Powell	15	1979–80	Harvard

== Steals ==
Career
Rk	Player	Steals	Seasons
1	Warren Anderson	231	1993–94 1994–95 1995–96 1996–97
2	Dedrick Dye	221	1999–00 2000–01 2001–02 2002–03
3	Billy Kurisko	199	1987–88 1988–89 1989–90 1990–91
4	Dean Borges	188	1986–87 1987–88 1989–90 1990–91
5	Courtney Pritchard	183	2000–01 2001–02 2002–03 2003–04
6	Kenneth Ortiz	177	2011–12 2012–13 2013–14
7	Terrance Bailey	176	1983–84 1984–85 1985–86 1986–87
8	Bobby Hopson	162	1990–91 1991–92 1992–93 1993–94
9	Mark Porter	152	2004–05 2005–06 2006–07 2007–08
10	Andre Van Drost	131	1982–83 1983–84 1985–86 1986–87

Season
Rk	Player	Steals	Season
1	Warren Anderson	71	1996–97
2	Dean Borges	70	1986–87
3	Billy Kurisko	68	1990–91
4	Billy Kurisko	65	1988–89
	Warren Anderson	65	1995–96
6	Kenneth Ortiz	63	2012–13
	Dedrick Dye	63	2000–01
	Courtney Pritchard	63	2002–03
9	Howard Thompkins	62	1979–80
10	Warren Anderson	61	1994–95

Single game
Rk	Player	Steals	Season	Opponent
1	Dedrick Dye	8	2000–01	Robert Morris
	Frantz Pierre Louis	8	1998–99	Fairleigh Dickinson
	Billy Kurisko	8	1990–91	St. Francis Brooklyn
	Arvie Powell	8	1982–83	Fairleigh Dickinson
5	Elijah Ford	7	2020–21	Merrimack
	Blake Francis	7	2017–18	Mercy
	Kenneth Ortiz	7	2013–14	Bryant
	Warren Anderson	7	1996–97	Saint Francis U
	Quincy Lewis	7	1992–93	Iona
	Monty Davis	7	1989–90	Staten Island
	Pat Burke	7	1988–89	Fairleigh Dickinson
	Andre Van Drost	7	1986–87	Medgar Evers
	Andre Van Drost	7	1985–86	Saint Francis U
	Art Redmond	7	1984–85	Idaho State
	Terrance Bailey	7	1983–84	Siena
	Henry Dillard	7	1978–79	Fairleigh Dickinson

== Blocks ==
Career
Rk	Player	Blocks	Seasons
1	Naofall Folahan	230	2010–11 2011–12 2012–13 2013–14
2	Frantz Pierre Louis	176	1994–95 1995–96 1996–97 1997–98 1998–99
3	AJ Sumbry	135	2016–17 2017–18 2018–19
	Miladin Mutavdzic	135	1991–92 1992–93
5	Jermaine Hall	124	1999–00 2000–01 2001–02 2002–03
6	Durell Vinson	118	2003–04 2004–05 2005–06 2007–08
7	Nick Frederick	105	1987–88 1988–89 1989–90 1990–91
8	Nigel Wyatte	94	2000–01 2001–02 2002–03 2003–04
9	Dave Smolka	86	1982–83 1983–84 1984–85 1985–86
10	Mark Porter	84	2004–05 2005–06 2006–07 2007–08

Season
Rk	Player	Blocks	Season
1	Naofall Folahan	89	2013–14
2	Miladin Mutavdzic	79	1991–92
3	Frantz Pierre Louis	73	1998–99
4	AJ Sumbry	58	2017–18
	Miladin Mutavdzic	56	1992–93
6	Frantz Pierre Louis	54	1995–96
7	Naofall Folahan	52	2011–12
8	Todd Grain	47	1986–87
9	Naofall Folahan	45	2010–11
	Dave Smolka	45	1985–86

Single game
Rk	Player	Blocks	Season	Opponent
1	Naofall Folahan	10	2013–14	Monmouth
2	Miladin Mutavdzic	8	1991–92	Fairleigh Dickinson
3	Naofall Folahan	7	2010–11	Princeton
	Frantz Pierre Louis	7	1995–96	Fairfield
	Nick Frederick	7	1990–91	Marist
	Dave Smolka	7	1985–86	Monmouth
7	Mario Moody	6	2012–13	SMU
	Naofall Folahan	6	2011–12	LIU Brooklyn
	Miladin Mutavdzic	6	1991–92	Brooklyn
	Miladin Mutavdzic	6	1991–92	Rider
	Todd Grain	6	1986–87	Staten Island
	Ray McAdams	6	1983–84	Hofstra
	Ray McAdams	6	1983–84	Staten Island
	Larry Clarke	6	1981–82	Boston Univ.
	Frantz Pierre Louis	6	1997–98	UMES
	Frantz Pierre Louis	6	1998–99	Robert Morris
	Frantz Pierre Louis	6	1998–99	Saint Francis U
