= Ewing (unincorporated community), New Jersey =

Populated place in Mercer County, New Jersey, US

Ewing, New Jersey
- Unincorporated community
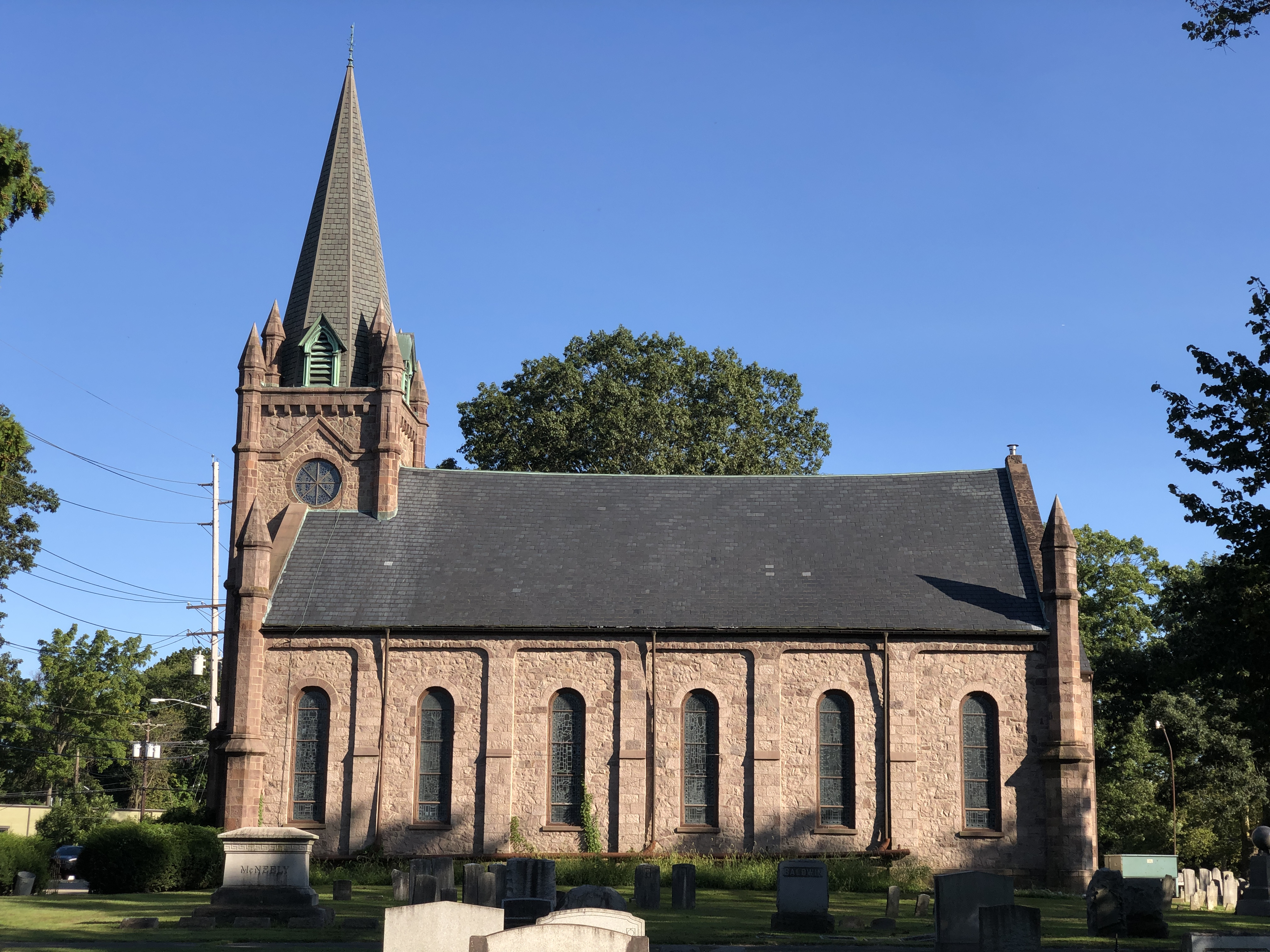
- Ewing Presbyterian Church

- Location within Mercer County, New Jersey Location within New Jersey Location within the United States
- Coordinates: 40°16′11″N 74°48′00″W
- Country: United States
- State: New Jersey
- County: Mercer
- Township: Ewing
- Elevation: 157 ft (48 m)
- GNIS feature ID: 876247

Ewing is a section of Ewing Township in Mercer County, in the U.S. state of New Jersey. Located at the intersection of Upper Ferry Road and Scotch Road, it is one of the oldest settlements in Ewing Township and dates back to the 18th century. The community was known as Carleton before adopting its current name.
