= Justice Ewing =

Justice Ewing may refer to:

- Charles Ewing (politician) (1780–1832), chief justice of the New Jersey Supreme Court
- Ephraim Brevard Ewing (1819–1873), associate justice of the Supreme Court of Missouri
