= Ewing Township, New Jersey =

Township in Mercer County, New Jersey, US

- Township
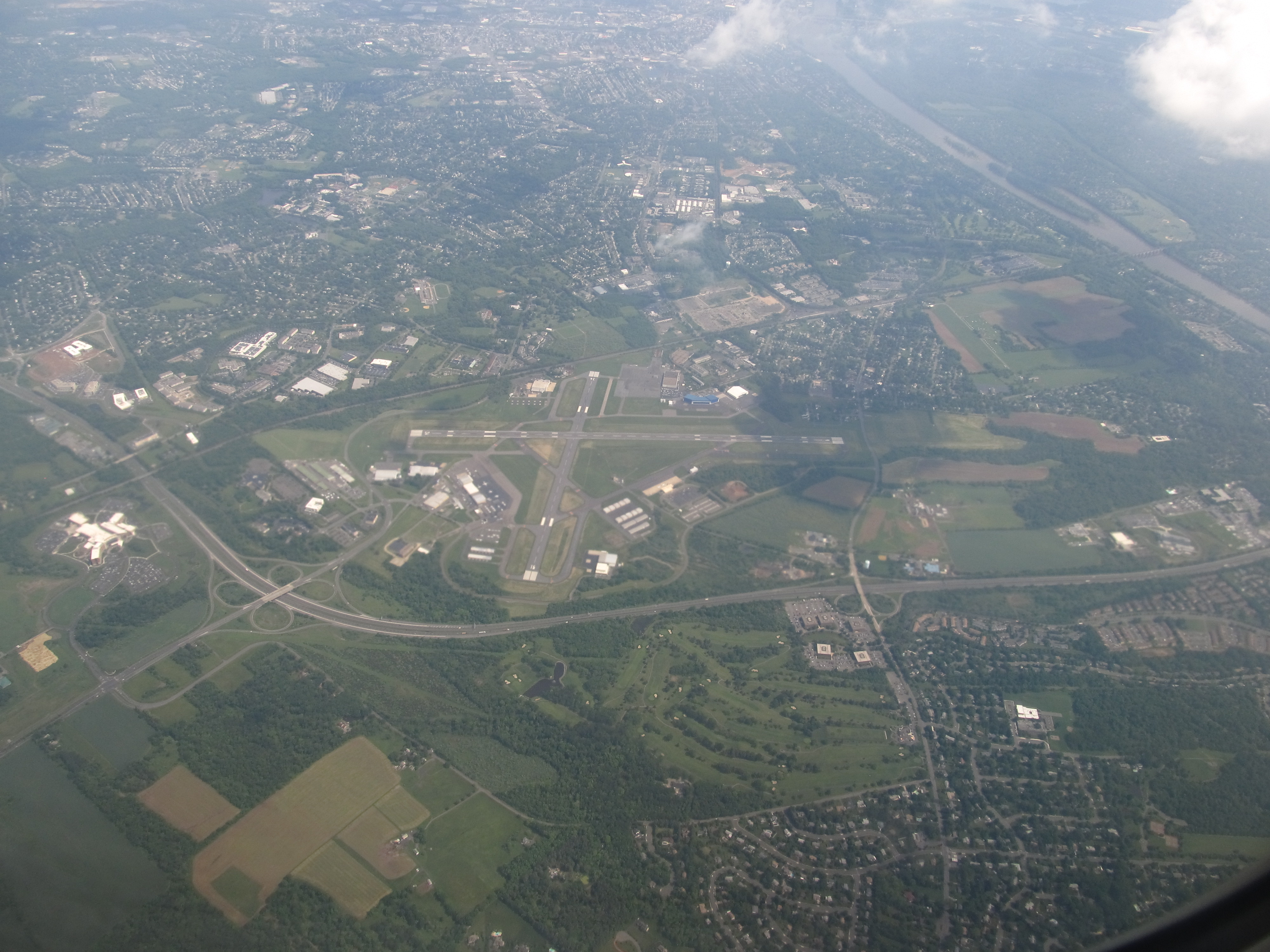
- Aerial view of Ewing, looking southeast and featuring Trenton–Mercer Airport, Interstate 295, and the Delaware River

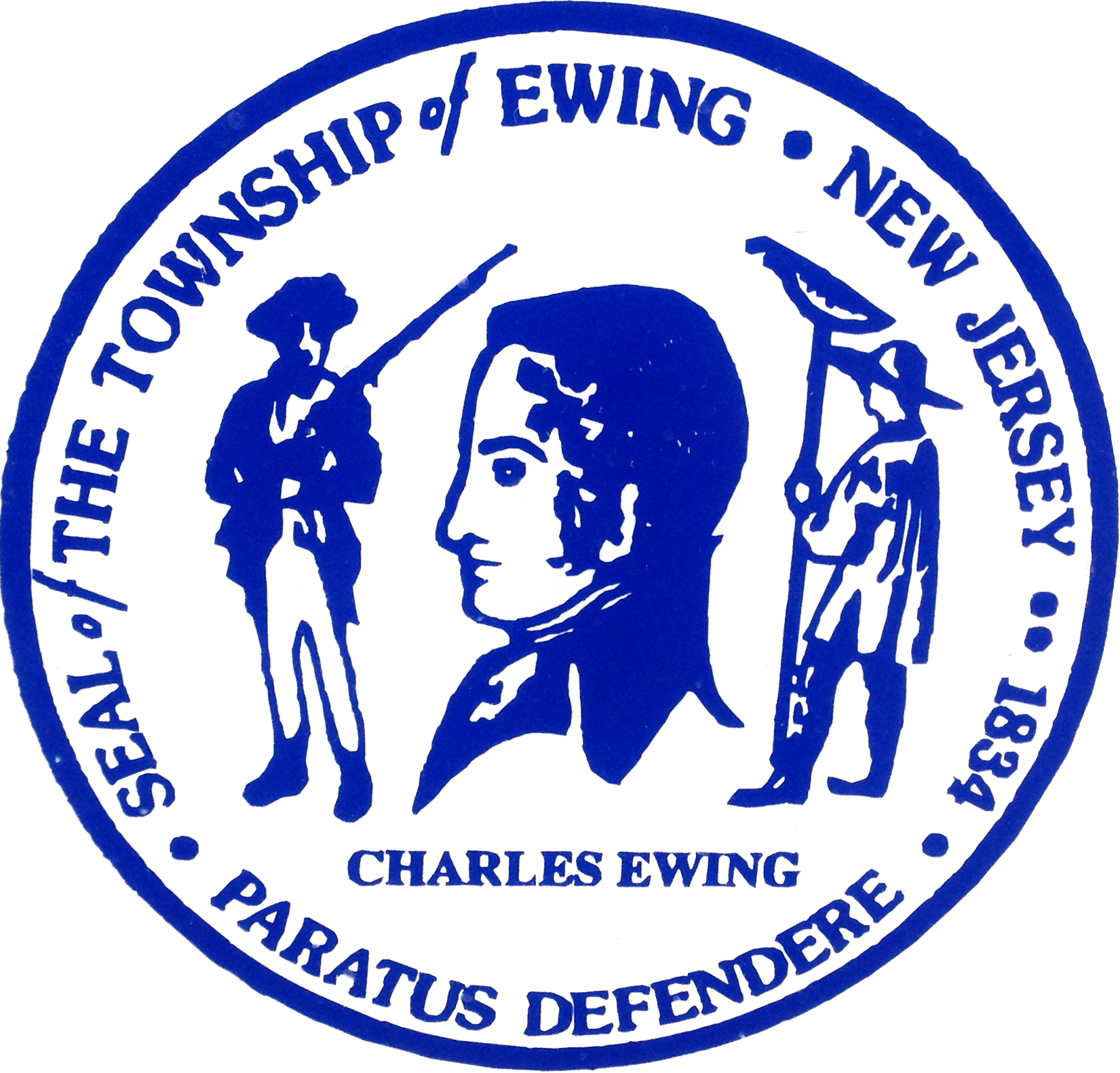
- Seal

- Location of Ewing Township in Mercer County highlighted in red (right). Inset map: Location of Mercer County in New Jersey highlighted in orange (left).

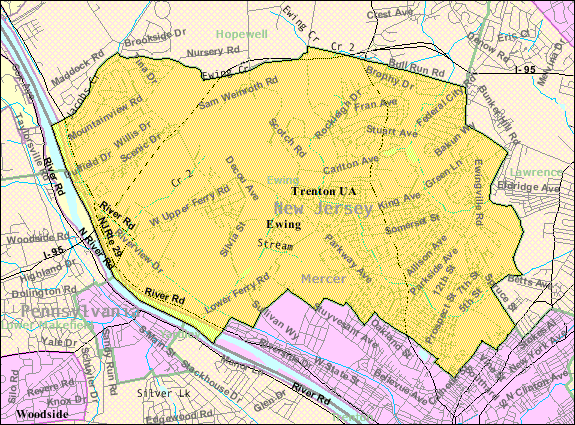
- Census Bureau map of Ewing Township, New Jersey

- Location in Mercer County Location in New Jersey Location in the United States
- Coordinates: 40.263344°N 74.798704°W
- Country: United States
- State: New Jersey
- County: Mercer
- Incorporated: February 22, 1834
- Named for: Charles Ewing

Government
  - Type: Faulkner Act (mayor–council)
  - Body: Township Council
  - Mayor: Bert H. Steinmann (D, term ends December 31, 2026)
  - Administrator: Aaron T. Watson
  - Municipal clerk: Kim J. Macellaro

Area
  - Total: 15.56 sq mi (40.29 km^{2})
  - Land: 15.20 sq mi (39.38 km^{2})
  - Water: 0.35 sq mi (0.90 km^{2}) 2.24%
  - Rank: 174th of 565 in state 8th of 12 in county
- Elevation: 128 ft (39 m)

Population (2020)
  - Total: 37,264
  - Estimate (2023): 34,753
  - Rank: 64th of 565 in state 3rd of 12 in county
  - Density: 2,450.6/sq mi (946.2/km^{2})
  - Rank: 255th of 565 in state 5th of 12 in county
- Time zone: UTC−05:00 (Eastern (EST))
  - Summer (DST): UTC−04:00 (Eastern (EDT))
- ZIP Codes: 08560, 08618, 08628, 08638
- Area code: 609
- FIPS code: 3402122185
- GNIS feature ID: 0882128
- Website: ewingnj.org

Ewing Township is a township in Mercer County, in the U.S. state of New Jersey. The township falls within the Trenton-Princeton metropolitan statistical area (which includes all of Mercer County), which is part of the New York combined statistical area as defined by the United States Census Bureau. It borders the Philadelphia metropolitan area and is part of the Federal Communications Commission's Philadelphia Designated Market Area. As of the 2020 United States census, the township's population was 37,264, its highest decennial count ever and an increase of 1,474 (+4.1%) from the 35,790 recorded at the 2010 census, which in turn reflected an increase of 83 (+0.2%) from the 35,707 counted in the 2000 census.

== History ==
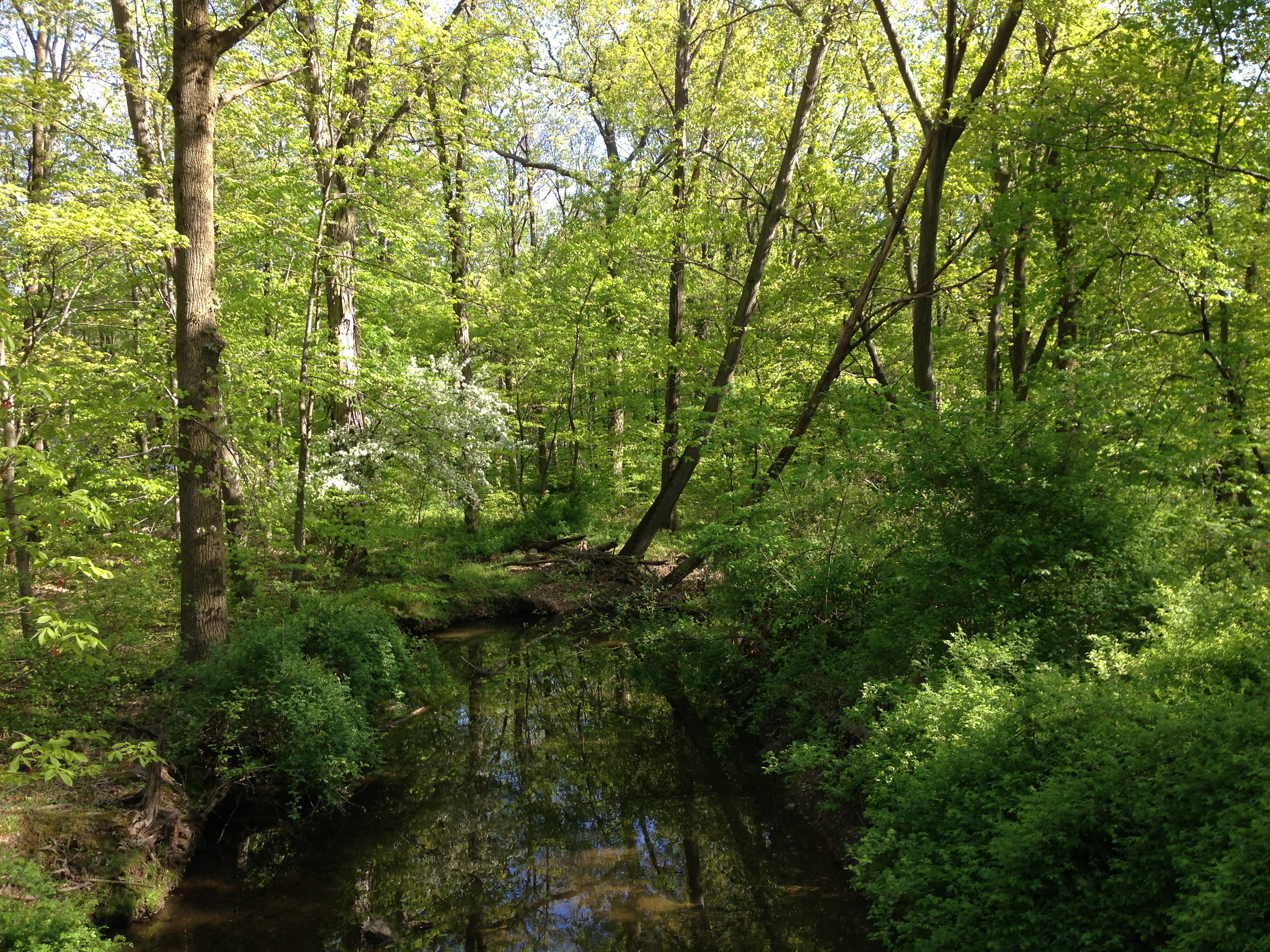
Woodlands along West Branch Shabakunk Creek represent Ewing Township's appearance before the arrival of European settlers.

The earliest inhabitants of present-day Ewing Township in the historic era were Lenni Lenape Native Americans, who lived along the banks of the Delaware River. Their pre-colonial subsistence activities in the area included hunting, fishing, pottery-making, and simple farming. European settlers, mostly from the British Isles, began to colonize the area in 1699. One of the earliest European settlers was William Green, and his 1717 farmhouse still stands on the campus of The College of New Jersey.

The area that is now Ewing Township was part of Hopewell Township in what was a very large Burlington County at the beginning of the 18th century. In 1714 Hopewell was removed from Burlington County and added to Hunterdon County. By 1719, the area which was to become Ewing Township had been removed from Hopewell Township and added to the newly created Trenton Township. Portions of Trenton Township were incorporated as Ewing Township by an act of the New Jersey Legislature on February 22, 1834, posthumously honoring Charles Ewing for his work as Chief Justice of the New Jersey Supreme Court. The township became part of the newly created Mercer County on February 22, 1838. After incorporation, Ewing Township received additional territory taken from Lawrence Township and the city of Trenton in 1858. In 1894 the city of Trenton took back some of that territory, annexing more in 1900.

When Ewing Township was incorporated in the 19th century, it was primarily farmland with a handful of scattered hamlets, including Carleton (now known as Ewing), Cross Keys (now known as Ewingville), Birmingham (now known as West Trenton) and Greensburg (now known as Wilburtha). Since the beginning of the 20th century, the township has developed as a suburb of Trenton. The sections near the city border are distinctly urban, but most of the township is suburban residential development. The main commercial district extends along North Olden Avenue Extension (County Route 622), originally constructed to connect north Trenton residences with the now-closed General Motors Inland Fisher Guide Plant. Ewing Township today is the location of The College of New Jersey, the Community Blood Council of New Jersey, New Jersey State Police headquarters, the Jones Farm State Correction Institute, the Trenton Psychiatric Hospital, the New Jersey Department of Transportation headquarters, the Maria H. Katzenbach School for the Deaf and Trenton-Mercer Airport.

From 1953 until 1997, Ewing was the home of Naval Air Warfare Center Trenton, encompassing 528 acres (214 ha) on Parkway Avenue. It was used by the United States Navy as a jet engine test facility until its closure based on the recommendations of the 1993 Base Closure and Realignment Commission. Nearly 700 civilian positions were eliminated, most of which were relocated to other facilities in Maryland and Tennessee. The base's Marine operations were transferred to Fort Dix, which has since become Joint Base McGuire-Dix-Lakehurst. A charity to end homelessness acquired the base at no cost in October 2013 in a process involving the United States Department of Defense, the United States Department of Housing and Urban Development, Mercer County and Ewing Township.

The first industrial robot used to replace human workers was deployed at Ewing's Inland Fisher Guide Plant in 1961, a facility that operated in the township for 1938 to 1998, after which the plant was demolished and targeted for redevelopment.

== Geography ==
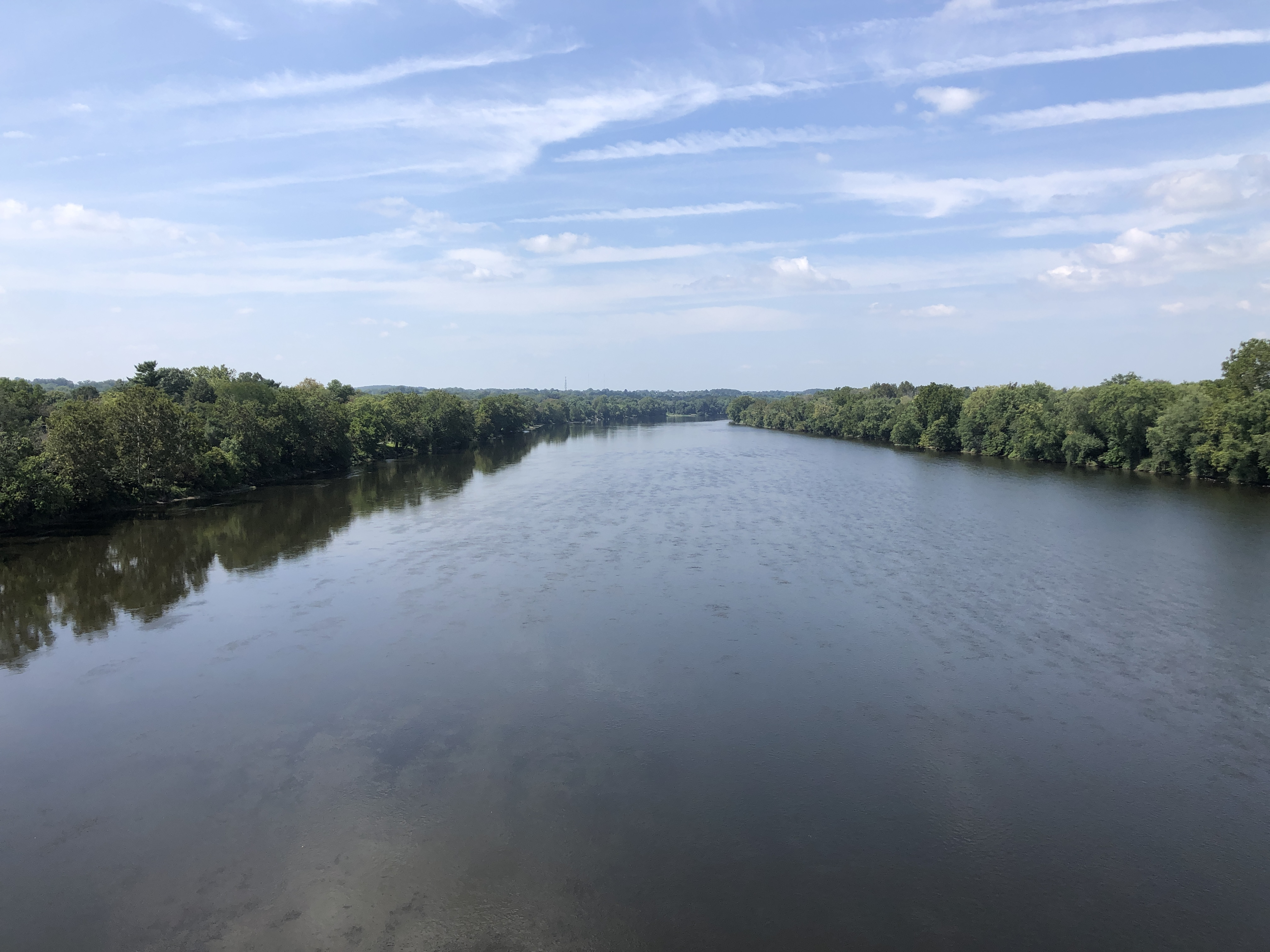
The Delaware River forms the western border of Ewing Township.

According to the U.S. Census Bureau, the township had a total area of 15.56 square miles (40.29 km^{2}), including 15.21 square miles (39.38 km^{2}) of land and 0.35 square miles (0.90 km^{2}) of water (2.24%).

The highest elevation in Ewing Township is 225 feet (69 m) above mean sea level (AMSL) just southeast of Interstate 295 and just west of Trenton-Mercer Airport, while the lowest point is just below 20 feet (6.1 m) AMSL along the Delaware River near the border with Trenton.

The largest body of water completely within the township is Lake Sylva, a man-made lake covering 10.6 acres (4.3 ha) that was created in the 1920s when an earthen dam was constructed across the Shabakunk Creek. The 11-acre (4.5 ha) lake is located on the campus of The College of New Jersey. Watercourses in Ewing include the Delaware River along its western boundary and the Shabakunk Creek in the eastern and central portions of the township.

The township has a number of distinct neighborhoods, including Agasote, Altura, Arbor Walk, Braeburn Heights, Briarcrest, Briarwood, Cambridge Hall, Churchill Green, Delaware Rise, Ewing, Ewing Park, Ewingville, Fernwood, Ferry Road Manor, Fleetwood Village, Glendale, Green Curve Heights, Hampton Hills, Heath Manor, Hickory Hill Estates, Hillwood Lakes, Hillwood Manor, Mountainview, Parkway Village, Prospect Heights, Prospect Park, Scudders Falls, Shabakunk Hills, Sherbrooke Manor, Somerset, Spring Meadows, Spring Valley, Village on the Green, Weber Park, West Trenton, Whitewood Estates, Wilburtha and Wynnewood Manor. Some of these existed before suburbanization, while others came into existence with the suburban development of the township in the 20th century.

The township borders the municipalities of Hopewell Township, Lawrence Township, Trenton in Mercer County; and Lower Makefield Township, Upper Makefield Township and Yardley in Bucks County across the Delaware River in Pennsylvania.

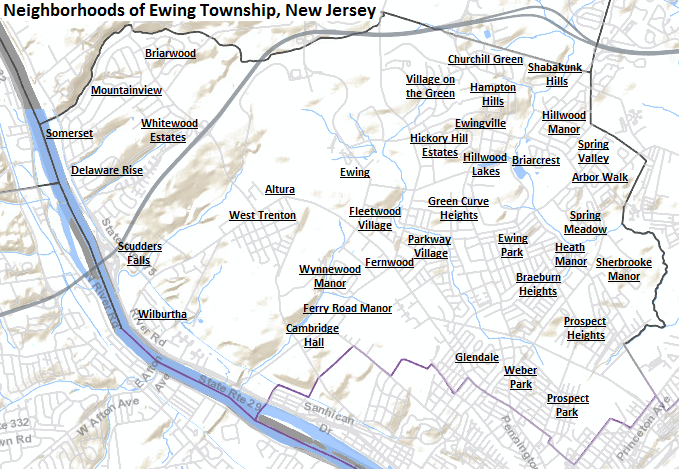
Map of Ewing Township neighborhoods

== Demographics ==
Historical population
Census	Pop.	Note	%±
1840	1,017		—
1850	1,480		45.5%
1860	2,079		40.5%
1870	2,477		19.1%
1880	2,412		−2.6%
1890	3,129		29.7%
1900	1,333	*	−57.4%
1910	1,889		41.7%
1920	3,475		84.0%
1930	6,942		99.8%
1940	10,146		46.2%
1950	16,840		66.0%
1960	26,628		58.1%
1970	32,831		23.3%
1980	34,842		6.1%
1990	34,185		−1.9%
2000	35,707		4.5%
2010	35,790		0.2%
2020	37,264		4.1%
2023 (est.)	34,753		−6.7%
Population sources: 1840–1920 1840 1850–1870; 1850 1870 1880–1890; 1890–1910 1910–1930; 1940–2000 2000; 2010 2020 * = Lost territory in previous decade.

=== 2010 census ===
The 2010 United States census counted 35,790 people, 13,171 households, and 7,982 families in the township. The population density was 2,346.9 per square mile (906.1/km^{2}). There were 13,926 housing units at an average density of 913.2 per square mile (352.6/km^{2}). The racial makeup was 63.14% (22,598) White, 27.62% (9,885) Black or African American, 0.30% (109) Native American, 4.30% (1,538) Asian, 0.04% (15) Pacific Islander, 2.24% (803) from other races, and 2.35% (842) from two or more races. Hispanic or Latino of any race were 7.62% (2,727) of the population.

Of the 13,171 households, 22.3% had children under the age of 18; 43.0% were married couples living together; 13.2% had a female householder with no husband present and 39.4% were non-families. Of all households, 30.5% were made up of individuals and 11.5% had someone living alone who was 65 years of age or older. The average household size was 2.40 and the average family size was 2.97.

16.3% of the population were under the age of 18, 20.0% from 18 to 24, 23.0% from 25 to 44, 25.9% from 45 to 64, and 14.7% who were 65 years of age or older. The median age was 37.2 years. For every 100 females, the population had 88.7 males. For every 100 females ages 18 and older there were 85.9 males.

The Census Bureau's 2006–2010 American Community Survey showed that (in 2010 inflation-adjusted dollars) median household income was $69,716 (with a margin of error of +/− $2,668) and the median family income was $86,875 (+/− $4,312). Males had a median income of $56,308 (+/− $6,003) versus $52,313 (+/− $1,887) for females. The per capita income for the borough was $30,489 (+/− $1,527). About 4.7% of families and 10.0% of the population were below the poverty line, including 7.3% of those under age 18 and 6.4% of those age 65 or over.

=== 2000 census ===
As of the 2000 United States census there were 35,707 people, 12,551 households, and 8,208 families residing in the township. The population density was 2,328.6 inhabitants per square mile (899.1/km^{2}). There were 12,924 housing units at an average density of 842.8 per square mile (325.4/km^{2}). The racial makeup of the township was 69.02% White, 24.82% African American, 0.15% Native American, 2.27% Asian, 0.06% Pacific Islander, 1.83% from other races, and 1.84% from two or more races. Hispanic or Latino of any race were 4.44% of the population.

There were 12,551 households, out of which 25.3% had children under the age of 18 living with them, 49.7% were married couples living together, 12.2% had a female householder with no husband present, and 34.6% were non-families. 27.7% of all households were made up of individuals, and 12.1% had someone living alone who was 65 years of age or older. The average household size was 2.45 and the average family size was 3.00.

In the township the population was spread out, with 18.0% under the age of 18, 17.3% from 18 to 24, 26.8% from 25 to 44, 22.1% from 45 to 64, and 15.8% who were 65 years of age or older. The median age was 37 years. For every 100 females, there were 93.0 males. For every 100 females age 18 and over, there were 90.0 males.

The median income for a household in the township was $57,274, and the median income for a family was $67,618. Males had a median income of $44,531 versus $35,844 for females. The per capita income for the township was $24,268. About 3.3% of families and 6.4% of the population were below the poverty line, including 5.4% of those under age 18 and 7.1% of those age 65 or over.

== Climate ==
According to the Köppen climate classification system, Ewing Township has a Hot-summer Humid continental climate (Dfa).

Climate data for Ewing Twp (40.2650, -74.8006), 1991-2020 normals, extremes 1981-2024
Month	Jan	Feb	Mar	Apr	May	Jun	Jul	Aug	Sep	Oct	Nov	Dec	Year
Record high °F (°C)	71.3 (21.8)	77.5 (25.3)	87.6 (30.9)	95.1 (35.1)	95.4 (35.2)	98.2 (36.8)	104.2 (40.1)	99.7 (37.6)	97.5 (36.4)	93.1 (33.9)	80.1 (26.7)	75.1 (23.9)	104.2 (40.1)
Mean daily maximum °F (°C)	40.2 (4.6)	42.7 (5.9)	50.6 (10.3)	62.8 (17.1)	72.3 (22.4)	81.4 (27.4)	86.2 (30.1)	84.4 (29.1)	77.9 (25.5)	66.0 (18.9)	55.1 (12.8)	45.0 (7.2)	63.8 (17.7)
Daily mean °F (°C)	31.7 (−0.2)	33.7 (0.9)	41.1 (5.1)	52.2 (11.2)	61.9 (16.6)	71.1 (21.7)	76.0 (24.4)	74.3 (23.5)	67.5 (19.7)	55.7 (13.2)	45.3 (7.4)	36.7 (2.6)	54.0 (12.2)
Mean daily minimum °F (°C)	23.3 (−4.8)	24.7 (−4.1)	31.7 (−0.2)	41.6 (5.3)	51.5 (10.8)	60.7 (15.9)	65.9 (18.8)	64.1 (17.8)	57.1 (13.9)	45.4 (7.4)	35.5 (1.9)	28.4 (−2.0)	44.3 (6.8)
Record low °F (°C)	−9.4 (−23.0)	−0.9 (−18.3)	5.8 (−14.6)	18.2 (−7.7)	32.4 (0.2)	42.6 (5.9)	49.3 (9.6)	42.6 (5.9)	37.2 (2.9)	25.1 (−3.8)	12.6 (−10.8)	0.4 (−17.6)	−9.4 (−23.0)
Average precipitation inches (mm)	3.58 (91)	2.83 (72)	4.26 (108)	3.68 (93)	4.05 (103)	4.43 (113)	4.84 (123)	4.45 (113)	4.18 (106)	4.14 (105)	3.33 (85)	4.43 (113)	48.20 (1,224)
Average snowfall inches (cm)	7.7 (20)	8.1 (21)	3.5 (8.9)	0.1 (0.25)	0.0 (0.0)	0.0 (0.0)	0.0 (0.0)	0.0 (0.0)	0.0 (0.0)	0.2 (0.51)	0.5 (1.3)	3.2 (8.1)	23.3 (59)
Average dew point °F (°C)	21.4 (−5.9)	22.0 (−5.6)	27.6 (−2.4)	37.3 (2.9)	49.4 (9.7)	59.5 (15.3)	64.3 (17.9)	63.7 (17.6)	57.7 (14.3)	46.1 (7.8)	34.9 (1.6)	27.2 (−2.7)	42.7 (5.9)
Source 1: PRISM
Source 2: NOHRSC (Snow, 2008/2009 - 2024/2025 normals)

== Ecology ==
According to the A. W. Kuchler U.S. potential natural vegetation types, Ewing Township would have a dominant vegetation type of Appalachian Oak (104) with a dominant vegetation form of Eastern Hardwood Forest (25).

== Economy ==
In May 2013, Church & Dwight relocated its corporate headquarters from Princeton to Ewing. In mid–2013, Celator Pharmaceuticals established an office presence in Ewing.

== Government ==
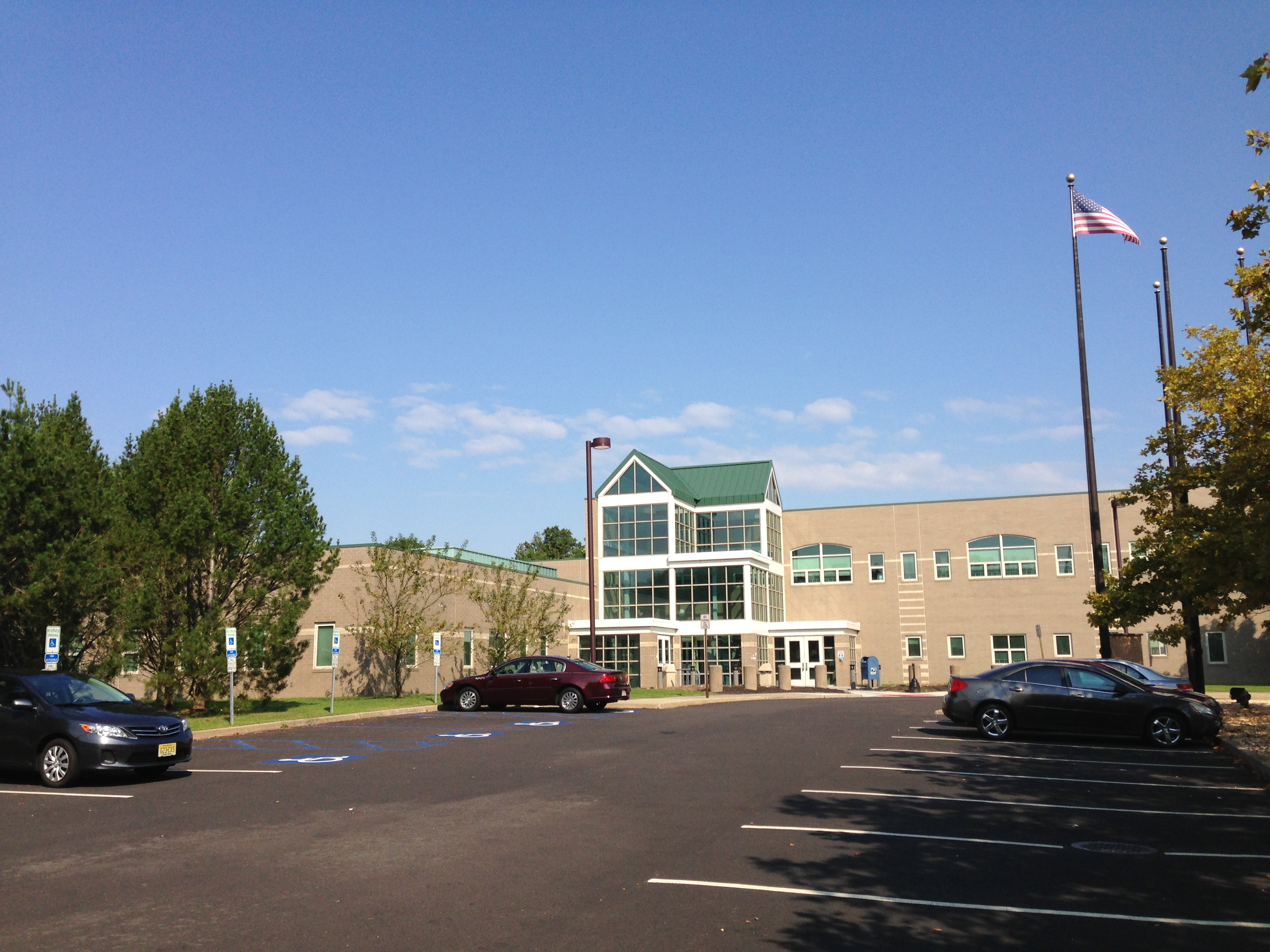
Ewing Township Municipal Building

=== Local government ===
Ewing Township is governed under the Faulkner Act, formally known as the Optional Municipal Charter Law, within the Mayor-Council plan 2 form of New Jersey municipal government, as implemented as of January 1, 1995, based on the recommendations of a Charter Study Commission. The township is one of 71 municipalities (of the 564) statewide governed under this form. The township's governing body is comprised of the Mayor and the five-member Township Council, all of whom are elected by the voters at-large to four-year terms of office on a staggered basis. with either three seats up for election or two seats and the mayoral seat up together in even-numbered years as part of the November general election.

As of 2024, the Mayor of Ewing Township is Democrat Bert H. Steinmann, whose term of office ends December 31, 2026. Members of the Ewing Township Council are Council President Kevin Baxter (D, 2024), Vice President Jennifer L. Keyes-Maloney (D, 2024), David P. Schroth (D, 2024), Sarah Steward (D, 2026) and Kathy Culliton Wollert (D, 2026).

=== Federal, state and county representation ===
Ewing Township is located in the 12th Congressional District and is part of New Jersey's 15th state legislative district.

For the 119th United States Congress, New Jersey's 12th congressional district is represented by Bonnie Watson Coleman (D, Ewing Township). New Jersey is represented in the United States Senate by Democrats Cory Booker (Newark, term ends 2027) and Andy Kim (Moorestown, term ends 2031).

For the 2026–2027 session, the 15th legislative district of the New Jersey Legislature is represented in the State Senate by Shirley Turner (D, Lawrence Township) and in the General Assembly by Verlina Reynolds-Jackson (D, Trenton) and Anthony Verrelli (D, Hopewell Township).

Mercer County is governed by a County Executive who oversees the day-to-day operations of the county and by a seven-member Board of County Commissioners that acts in a legislative capacity, setting policy. All officials are chosen at-large in partisan elections, with the executive serving a four-year term of office while the commissioners serve three-year terms of office on a staggered basis, with either two or three seats up for election each year as part of the November general election. As of 2025, the County Executive is Daniel R. Benson (D, Hamilton Township) whose term of office ends December 31, 2027. Mercer County's Commissioners are:

Lucylle R. S. Walter (D, Ewing Township, 2026), Chair John A. Cimino (D, Hamilton Township, 2026), Samuel T. Frisby Sr. (D, Trenton, 2027), Cathleen M. Lewis (D, Lawrence Township, 2025), Vice Chair Kristin L. McLaughlin (D, Hopewell Township, 2027), Nina D. Melker (D, Hamilton Township, 2025) and Terrance Stokes (D, Ewing Township, 2027).

Mercer County's constitutional officers are: Clerk Paula Sollami-Covello (D, Lawrence Township, 2025), Sheriff John A. Kemler (D, Hamilton Township, 2026) and Surrogate Diane Gerofsky (D, Lawrence Township, 2026).

The New Jersey Juvenile Justice Commission has its headquarters in the township.

=== Politics ===
As of March 2011, there were a total of 21,714 registered voters in Ewing Township, of which 9,358 (43.1%) were registered as Democrats, 3,256 (15.0%) were registered as Republicans and 9,087 (41.8%) were registered as Unaffiliated. There were 13 voters registered as Libertarians or Greens.

United States presidential election results for Ewing Township
Year	Republican		Democratic		Third party(ies)	
Year	No.	%	No.	%	No.	%
2024	4,591	25.89%	12,828	72.33%	316	1.78%
2020	4,638	24.90%	13,718	73.63%	274	1.47%
2016	4,296	26.19%	11,512	70.18%	596	3.63%
2012	4,218	25.85%	11,910	72.99%	190	1.16%
2008	4,787	28.33%	11,911	70.49%	200	1.18%
2004	5,653	35.60%	10,091	63.55%	135	0.85%

In the 2012 presidential election, Democrat Barack Obama received 73.0% of the vote (11,910 cast), ahead of Republican Mitt Romney with 25.8% (4,218 votes), and other candidates with 1.2% (190 votes), among the 17,947 ballots cast by the township's 23,230 registered voters (1,629 ballots were spoiled), for a turnout of 77.3%. In the 2008 presidential election, Democrat Barack Obama received 70.0% of the vote (11,911 cast), ahead of Republican John McCain with 28.1% (4,787 votes) and other candidates with 1.2% (200 votes), among the 17,021 ballots cast by the township's 22,913 registered voters, for a turnout of 74.3%. In the 2004 presidential election, Democrat John Kerry received 62.0% of the vote (10,091 ballots cast), outpolling Republican George W. Bush with 34.7% (5,653 votes) and other candidates with 0.6% (135 votes), among the 16,284 ballots cast by the township's 22,019 registered voters, for a turnout percentage of 74.0.

Gubernatorial election results for Ewing Township
Year	Republican		Democratic		Third party(ies)	
Year	No.	%	No.	%	No.	%
2025	3,168	22.11%	11,062	77.21%	97	0.68%
2021	3,131	28.25%	7,852	70.83%	102	0.92%
2017	2,815	27.70%	7,147	70.32%	201	1.98%
2013	4,395	44.68%	5,279	53.66%	163	1.66%
2009	3,751	34.47%	6,529	60.00%	601	5.52%
2005	3,877	36.06%	6,435	59.85%	439	4.08%

In the 2013 gubernatorial election, Democrat Barbara Buono received 53.7% of the vote (5,279 cast), ahead of Republican Chris Christie with 44.7% (4,395 votes), and other candidates with 1.7% (163 votes), among the 10,070 ballots cast by the township's 22,876 registered voters (233 ballots were spoiled), for a turnout of 44.0%. In the 2009 gubernatorial election, Democrat Jon Corzine received 59.4% of the vote (6,529 ballots cast), ahead of Republican Chris Christie with 34.1% (3,751 votes), Independent Chris Daggett with 4.7% (520 votes) and other candidates with 0.7% (81 votes), among the 10,989 ballots cast by the township's 22,263 registered voters, yielding a 49.4% turnout.

United States Senate election results for Ewing Township1
Year	Republican		Democratic		Third party(ies)	
Year	No.	%	No.	%	No.	%
2024	4,142	24.35%	12,451	73.21%	415	2.44%
2018	3,398	28.29%	8,074	67.23%	538	4.48%
2012	3,970	25.55%	11,251	72.42%	315	2.03%
2006	3,976	36.92%	6,500	60.36%	292	2.71%

United States Senate election results for Ewing Township2
Year	Republican		Democratic		Third party(ies)	
Year	No.	%	No.	%	No.	%
2020	4,580	25.06%	13,453	73.61%	242	1.32%
2014	2,700	28.30%	6,691	70.14%	149	1.56%
2013	1,689	25.80%	4,767	72.82%	90	1.37%
2008	5,056	32.29%	10,260	65.52%	344	2.20%

== Education ==
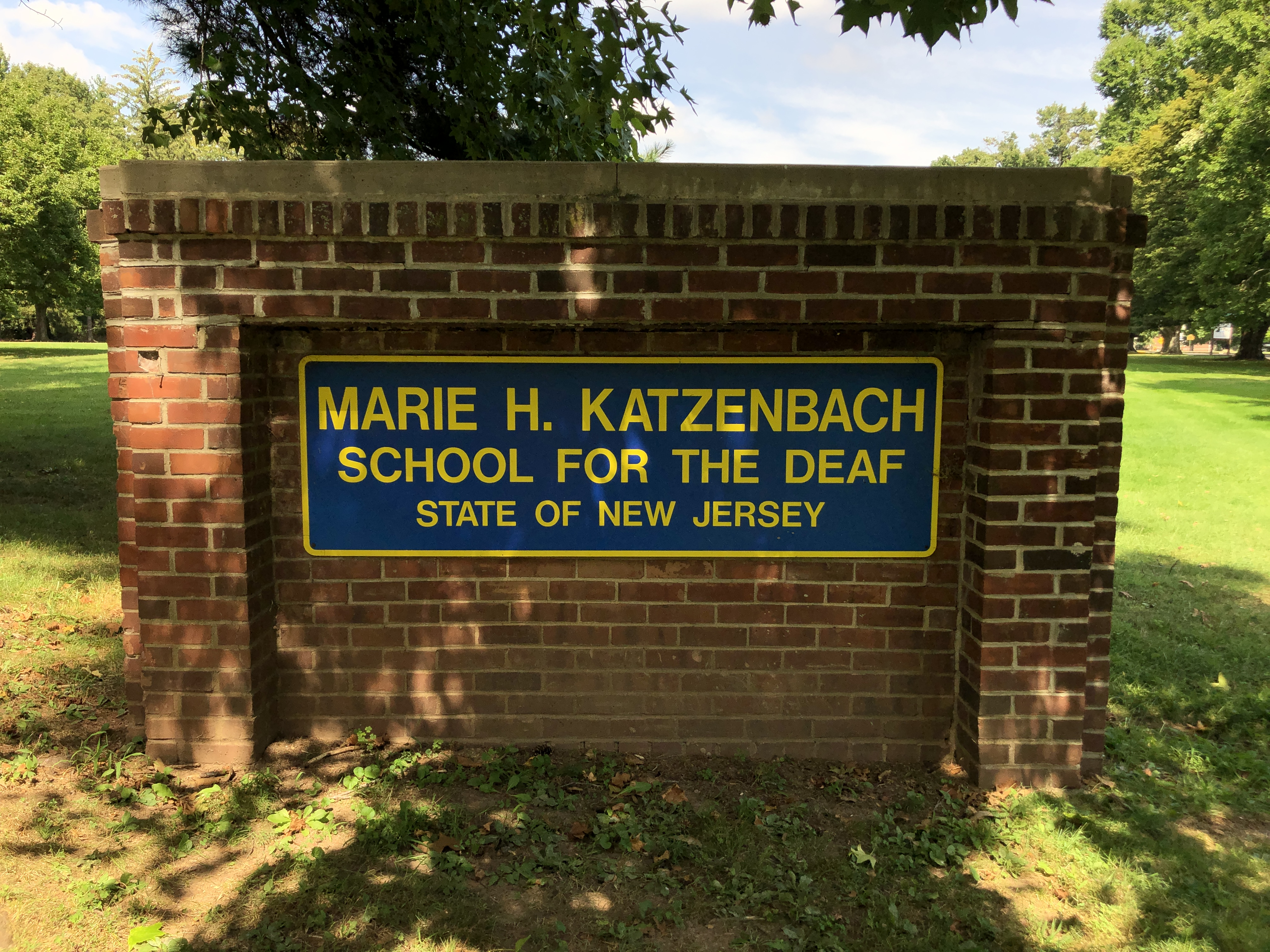
Marie H. Katzenbach School for the Deaf entrance

Ewing Public Schools serves students in pre-kindergarten through twelfth grade. As of the 2020–21 school year, the district, comprised of five schools, had an enrollment of 3,444 students and 333.0 classroom teachers (on an FTE basis), for a student–teacher ratio of 10.3:1. Schools in the district (with 2020–21 enrollment data from the National Center for Education Statistics) are W. L. Antheil Elementary School with 623 students in grades PreK-5, Francis Lore Elementary School with 500 students in grades K–5, Parkway Elementary School with 358 students in grades K–5, Gilmore J. Fisher Middle School with 827 students in grades 6–8, and Ewing High School with 1,080 students in grades 9–12.

A 1946 court case challenged a policy of the Ewing Public Schools under which the district provided bus transportation to students living in the districts who attended private parochial schools. In Everson v. Board of Education, the Supreme Court of the United States ruled for the first time that state and local government were subject to the Establishment Clause of the First Amendment to the United States Constitution, but that it had not been violated in this instance.

The Ewing Public Education Foundation, established in 1995, is an independent, not-for-profit citizen's organization whose mission is to mobilize community support, concern, commitment and resources to help improve the quality of education in Ewing Township. EPEF provides grants to Ewing Township Schools for innovative educational programs through fund-raising activities, and corporate and institutional sponsorship. The Foundation also seeks to match corporate and organizational donors with teachers to fund additional projects of mutual interest. These programs enhance the educational experience without the use of additional taxpayer dollars.

Eighth grade students from all of Mercer County are eligible to apply to attend the high school programs offered by the Mercer County Technical Schools, a county-wide vocational school district that offers full-time career and technical education at its Health Sciences Academy, STEM Academy and Academy of Culinary Arts, with no tuition charged to students for attendance. The Thomas J. Rubino Academy (formerly Mercer County Alternative High School) is one of Mercer County's only alternative schools, offering an alternative educational program for students who have struggled in the traditional school environment, featuring smaller classes, mentoring and counseling.

The Marie H. Katzenbach School for the Deaf opened in Trenton in 1883 and was there until 1923, when it moved to West Trenton. It serves 175 hearing-impaired students on a campus covering 148 acres (60 ha) that was opened in West Trenton in 1926. The school was established in Ewing through the efforts of Marie Hilson Katzenbach and was renamed in her honor in 1965.

Incarnation-St. James Catholic School (formerly Incarnation School), constructed in 1955, was a Pre-K to 8th grade parish school administered by The Sisters, Servants of the Immaculate Heart of Mary and overseen by the Roman Catholic Diocese of Trenton. In 2006, the Incarnation School and parish combined with the St. James School and parish. The school was closed by the parish at the end of the 2014–15 school year.

The Villa Victoria Academy is a private Catholic school in Ewing Township, christened as a private academy in 1933, and operated by the Religious Teachers Filippini. This single-gender school offers an education to young women from sixth to twelfth grade.

The College of New Jersey (formerly Trenton State College) is located on a campus covering 289 acres (117 ha) within the township.

== Transportation ==
Ewing Township is traversed by multiple main roadways, as well as by a passenger rail line and is the location of an airport.

=== Roads and highways ===
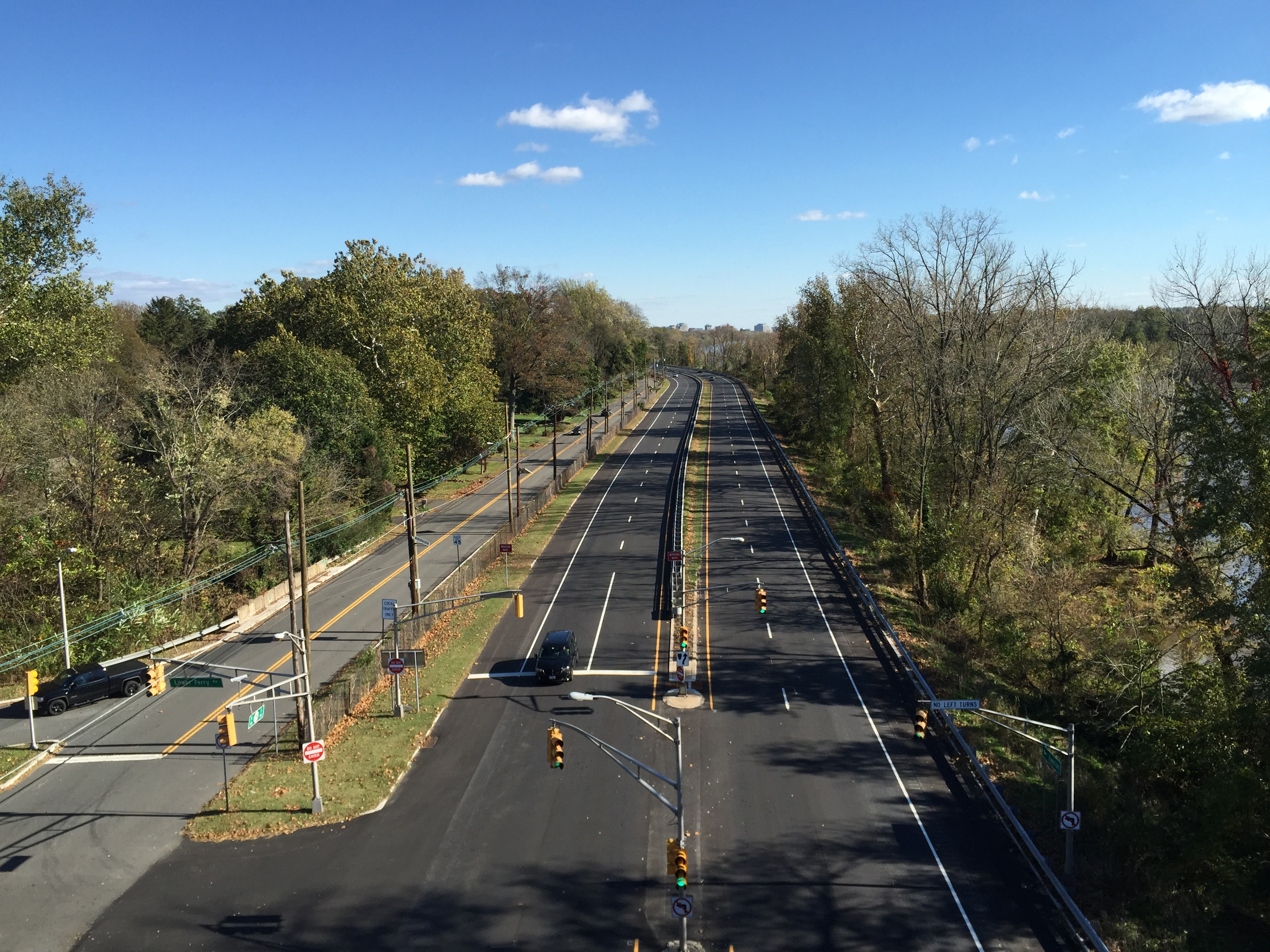
View south along the Daniel Bray Highway and River Road (Route 29 and Route 175) in Ewing

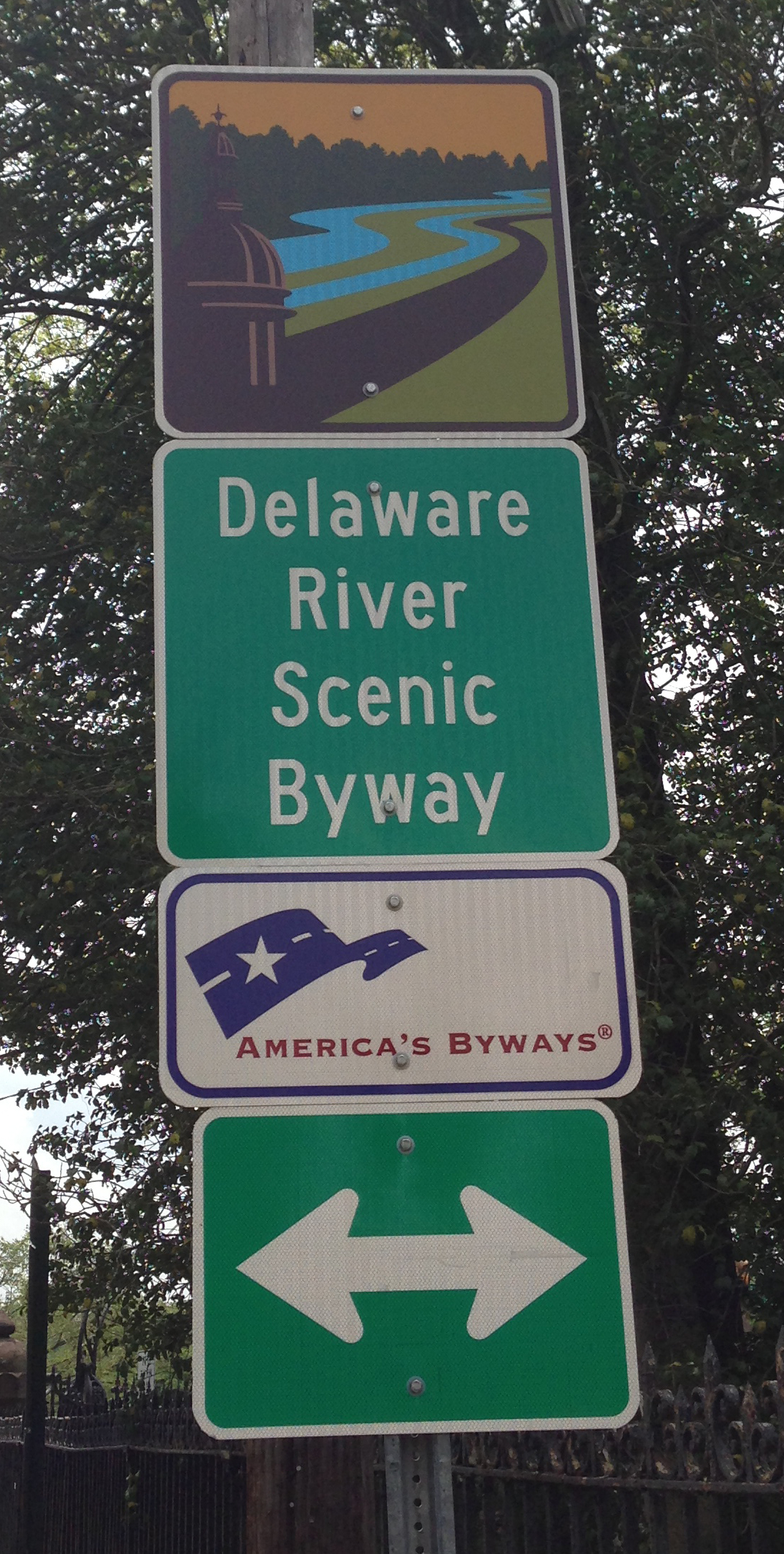
Signage for the Delaware River Scenic Byway along Route 29

As of May 2010, the township had a total of 149.74 miles (240.98 km) of roadways, of which 108.73 miles (174.98 km) were maintained by the municipality, 28.16 miles (45.32 km) by Mercer County, 12.65 miles (20.36 km) by the New Jersey Department of Transportation, which also has its headquarters in Ewing, and 0.20 miles (0.32 km) by the Delaware River Joint Toll Bridge Commission.

Several highways pass through the township. Interstate 295 crosses the northwestern section of the township. It is a 55 to 65 miles per hour (89 to 105 km/h), 4-6 lane divided freeway facility. Originally part of Interstate 95, it was constructed as a four-lane roadway in the 1960s, and widened to six lanes in the 1990s, with the exception of the Scudder Falls Bridge over the Delaware River. It connects south with Philadelphia and connects north to U.S. Route 1, where Interstate 295 curves south. From there, travelers use U.S. 1 or Interstate 195 and the New Jersey Turnpike to reach the next major destination northwards, New York City. The Ewing portion of Interstate 95 was redesignated as Interstate 295 in March 2018 ahead of a direct interchange between Interstate 95 in Pennsylvania and the Pennsylvania Turnpike being completed, re-routing Interstate 95 onto the New Jersey Turnpike at Exit 6 (in Mansfield Township).

U.S. Route 206 (Princeton Avenue) skirts the southeastern section of the township. It is a 25 miles per hour (40 km/h), undivided four-lane roadway. Although part of U.S. 206, it is maintained by the Mercer County Department of Transportation as part of County Route 583, which runs as a concurrency with U.S. 206, which connects south to Trenton, as well as north to Princeton and Somerville.

Route 29 (Daniel Bray Highway and River Road) extends north–south along the western edge of the township, along the Delaware River. The southern section, Daniel Bray Highway, is a 55 mph (89 km/h), divided four-lane facility with at-grade intersections and traffic lights, and was constructed in the 1950s. The northern section, River Road, is a 45 mph (72 km/h), undivided two-lane facility whose construction as a state highway dates from the 1930s. NJ 29 connects southwards to Trenton, and northwards to Lambertville and Frenchtown. The entire section of Route 29 in Ewing is designated the Delaware River Scenic Byway, a National Scenic Byway. Route 175 serves as a frontage road along the divided portion of Route 29.

Route 31 (Pennington Road) extends north–south towards the eastern side of the township. It is a 35–45 mph (56–72 km/h), undivided four-lane facility whose construction as a state highway also dates to the 1930s. It once also carried a trolley line, but it has long since been removed. It was once proposed to be bypassed by a freeway, but this plan has since been cancelled. Route 31 also connects south to Trenton, and connects north to Pennington, Flemington, and Clinton.

=== Public transportation ===
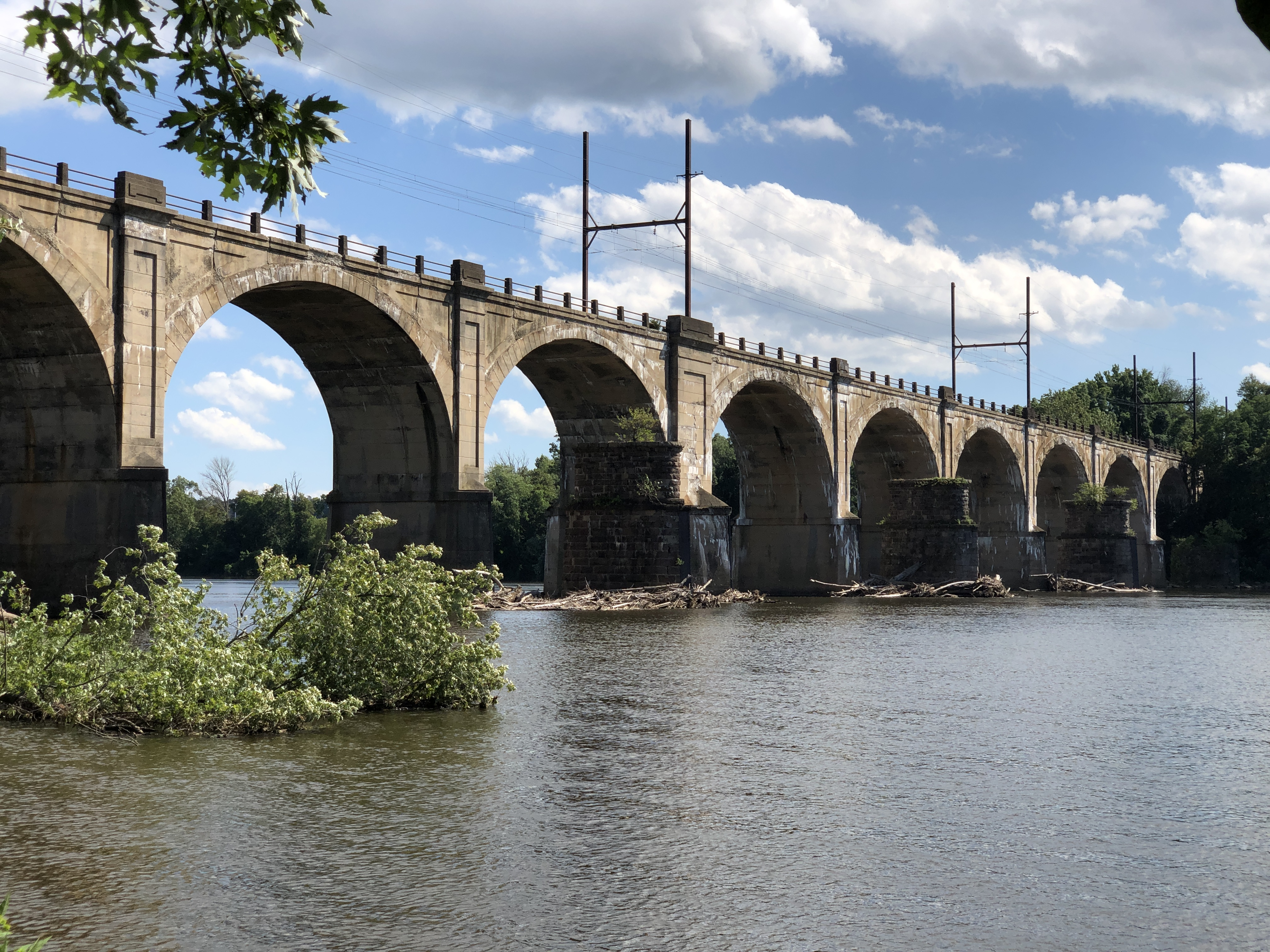
West Trenton Railroad Bridge across the Delaware River

The West Trenton station is at the terminus of SEPTA's West Trenton Line. This commuter rail facility mainly serves commuter traffic to and from Philadelphia. NJ Transit has proposed a new West Trenton Line of its own, that would stretch for 27 miles (43 km) from the West Trenton Station to a connection with the Raritan Valley Line at Bridgewater Township, and from there to Newark Penn Station in Newark.

Ewing Township is the site of the Trenton-Mercer Airport, which first opened in 1929 and is one of three commercial airports in the state. The airport has 100,000 takeoffs and landings annually, and is served by Frontier Airlines, which offers nonstop service to and from 10 different locations nationwide.

Ewing Township is also traversed by the Delaware and Raritan Canal near the Delaware River. Originally important to commerce and trade, the advent of railroads caused the canal's commercial demise. The strip of land along the canal is currently part of the Delaware and Raritan Canal State Park.

NJ Transit provides service between the township and Trenton on the 601, 607, 608, 609, and 624 routes.

== Points of interest ==
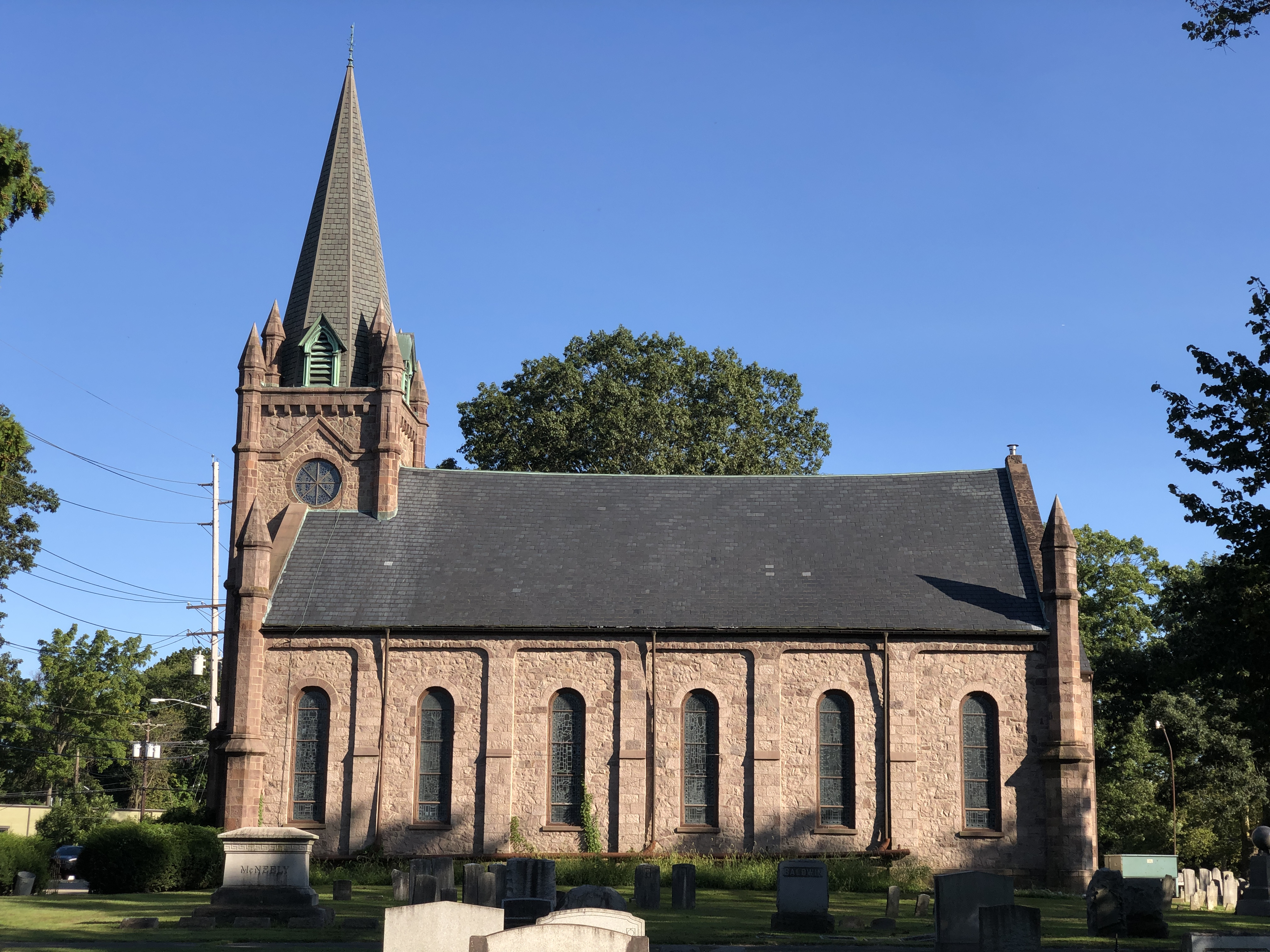
Ewing Covenant Presbyterian Church

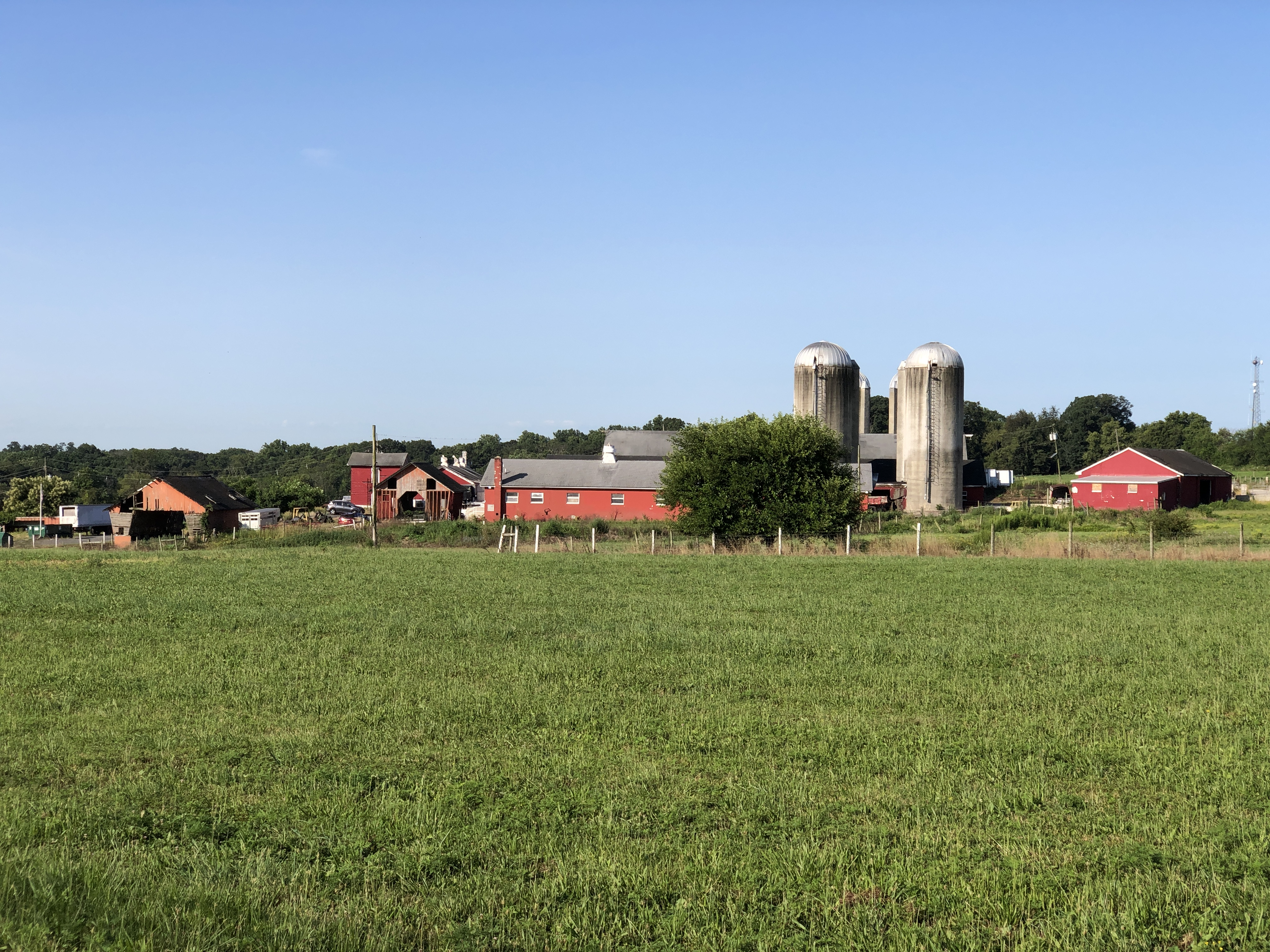
The Jones Farm, operated by the New Jersey Department of Corrections, was the last remaining farm in Ewing until it was shut down at the end of 2022

- The William Greene Farmhouse was the home of Judge William Greene, who was born in the 1600s in England and died in 1722 in Hunterdon County, New Jersey. The William Green House is on the U.S. National Register of Historic Places and the New Jersey Register of Historic Places.
- Delaware and Raritan Canal – Runs along the eastern bank of the Delaware River in western Ewing Township.
- Washington Victory Trail – Documents the trail taken by George Washington's army during the American Revolutionary War on December 26, 1776. This led to a successful surprise attack on the Hessian troops occupying Trenton, New Jersey. Victory trail begins in nearby Washington Crossing State Park, enters Ewing Township at Jacobs Creek Road (where George Washington's and his horse almost fell into the creek) and continues along Bear Tavern Road. General Sullivan's route follows Grand Avenue and Sullivan Way to Trenton. General Greene's route follows Parkway Avenue to Trenton.
- Ewing Covenant Presbyterian Church is a historic American Revolutionary War-era congregation. It is the fourth church to be built in the cemetery grounds. The current church building, dating from 1867, had been under threat of demolition but is now preserved.
- Ewing Church Cemetery is one of the oldest cemeteries in the area, having served the Ewing community for 300 years. It is home to the burial places of hundreds of veterans from The Revolutionary War to the Vietnam War. The grounds span over 50 acres and also include a mausoleum.
- Our Lady of Good Counsel Church, located on W. Upper Ferry Road, is a Roman Catholic church built in the early 1960s to meet the growing needs of the rapidly expanding township. Its architecture is similar to Saint Paul's Church in Princeton. The Church is a major worship center for the Catholic community in what is called the West Trenton section of the township.
- Louis Kahn's Trenton Bath House was an early work of the influential mid-twentieth century architect, made for the Trenton Jewish Community Center (now the Ewing Senior & Community Center).
- The offices and studios of radio station WKXW, "New Jersey 101.5", are located in Ewing.

== Notable people ==
People who were born in, residents of, or otherwise closely associated with Ewing Township include:

- Terrance Bailey (born 1965), former basketball player who led NCAA Division I in scoring in 1985–86 for the Wagner Seahawks
- Pierre Bernard, graphic designer and comedian for Late Night with Conan O'Brien on which he hosts the segment "Pierre Bernard's Recliner of Rage"
- Peggy Blackford (born 1942), American Ambassador to Guinea-Bissau from 1995 until June 1998, when relations were suspended
- Harold F. Brigham (1897–1971), librarian who served as director of the Indiana State Library and of the Louisville Free Public Library
- Al Clark (born 1948), former professional baseball umpire who worked in 3,392 major league games in his 26-year career
- Richie Cole (1948–2020), jazz saxophonist, composer and arranger.
- Hollis Copeland (born 1955), former basketball player with the New York Knicks
- Ben DeJesus, documentary filmmaker, television director and producer
- Dudley Dorival (born 1975), hurdler
- Nneka Ezeigbo, basketball player for the Robert Morris Colonials
- Steve Garrison (born 1986), Major League Baseball relief pitcher who played for the New York Yankees
- Janis Hirsch (born c. 1950), comedy writer best known for producing and writing for television
- Wayne Krenchicki (1954–2018), former MLB third baseman
- Kenneth Lampl (born 1964), composer and lecturer
- William M. Lanning (1849–1912), Republican Party politician who represented New Jersey's 4th congressional district in the United States House of Representatives from 1903 to 1904
- Dick LaRossa (born 1946), politician who served two terms in the New Jersey Senate, from 1994 to 2000, where he represented the 15th Legislative District
- Davon Reed (born 1995), NBA player signed with the Memphis Hustle
- Glenn K. Rieth (born 1957), former Adjutant General of New Jersey (2002–2011)
- Henry Rowan (1923–2015), engineer and philanthropist, for whom Rowan University was renamed, after he made a $100 million donation to the school
- Steve Shimko (born 1990), American football coach and former player who is the quarterbacks coach for the Dallas Cowboys
- Albert C. Wagner (1911–1987), director of the New Jersey Department of Corrections from 1966 to 1973
- Bonnie Watson Coleman (born 1945), politician, who has served as the U.S. representative for New Jersey's 12th congressional district since 2015 and in the New Jersey General Assembly from 2006 to 2010. She is the first black woman in Congress from New Jersey
