= Ben DeJesus =

American documentary filmmaker, television director, and producer

- Born: Trenton, New Jersey, U.S.
- Occupations: Director; producer; writer
- Years active: 1998–present

Ben DeJesus is an American documentary filmmaker, television director, and producer.

== Life and career ==
DeJesus was born in Trenton, New Jersey. Raised in nearby Ewing Township, New Jersey, he attended Ewing High School and studied theater and journalism at Rutgers University. After working as a stage actor, he obtained an internship at MTV, where he became an associate producer and writer on several seasons of MTV Cribs. In the early 2000s he founded Diamante Pictures and directed music videos for artists including Don Omar, Aventura, Fat Joe, and N.O.R.E..

DeJesus directed and produced the PBS documentary Tales from a Ghetto Klown (2013). He later directed Great Performances: John Leguizamo’s Road to Broadway (2018) and American Masters: Raúl Juliá: The World’s a Stage (2019). He also served as a producer on the Broadway production Latin History for Morons (2018) and directed episodes of the Disney Channel series Bunk’d. He co-founded the production company NGL Studios and later established Casa NoHo Studios.

In 2023, DeJesus began directing and executive producing the MSNBC series Leguizamo Does America. In 2024 he co-created and executive produced the three-part PBS series American Historia: The Untold History of Latinos.

== Selected filmography ==
| Year | Title | Contribution | Note |
|---|---|---|---|
| 2013 | Tales from a Ghetto Klown | Director and producer | Documentary |
| 2017–2019 | Bunk’d | Director | 2 Episodes |
| 2018 | Great Performances: John Leguizamo’s Road to Broadway | Director | Documentary |
| 2019 | American Masters: Raúl Juliá: The World’s a Stage | Director and producer | Documentary |
| 2021 | American Masters: Lights, Camera, Acción | Producer | Documentary short |
| 2023 | Leguizamo Does America | Director and executive producer | Documentary series |
| 2024 | American Historia: The Untold History of Latinos | Co-creator and executive producer | Documentary series |

== Awards and nominations ==
| Year | Result | Award | Category | Work | Ref. |
|---|---|---|---|---|---|
| 2018 | Nominated | Tony Awards | Best Play | Latin History for Morons | |
| 2019 | Won | Imagen Awards | Best Documentary | Great Performances: John Leguizamo’s Road to Broadway | |
| 2020 | Nominated | Primetime Creative Arts Emmy Awards | Outstanding Documentary or Nonfiction Series | American Masters: Raúl Juliá: The World’s a Stage | |
| 2022 | Won | Imagen Awards | Best Short Film | American Masters: Lights, Camera, Acción | |
| 2024 | Nominated | Cinema Eye Honors | Outstanding Anthology Series | Leguizamo Does America | |
| 2025 | Won | Imagen Awards | Best Special or Television Movie | American Historia: The Untold History of Latinos | |
