= Ewing High School (New Jersey) =

High school in Mercer County, New Jersey, US

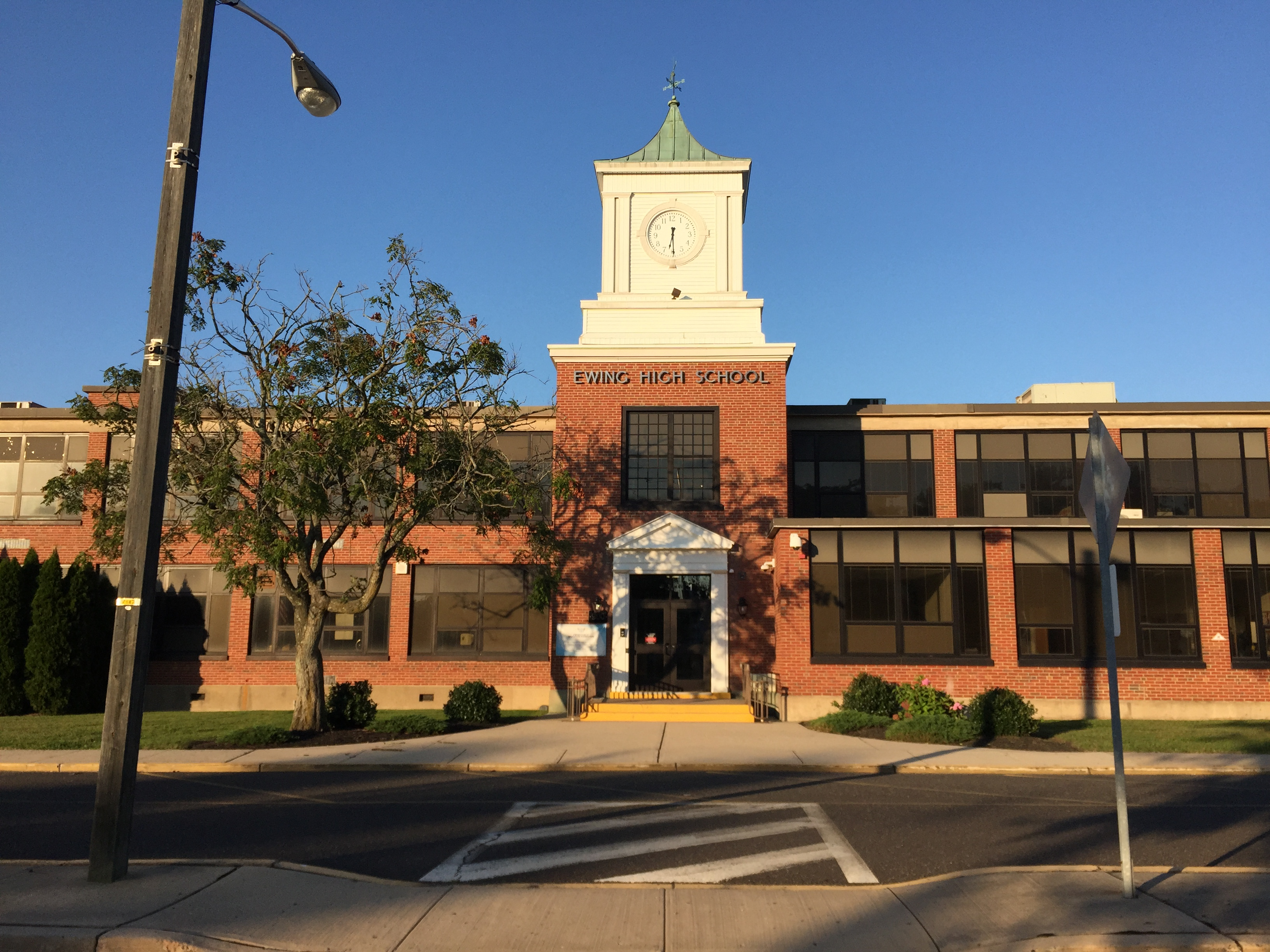

Location
- 900 Parkway Avenue; Ewing Township, Mercer County, New Jersey 08618; United States; 40.254669°N 74.791693°W

Information
- Type: Public high school
- Established: September 1951
- School district: Ewing Public Schools
- NCES School ID: 340492003068
- Principal: Lisa Sabo
- Faculty: 90.3 FTEs
- Grades: 9-12
- Enrollment: 1,118 (as of 2024–25)
- Student to teacher ratio: 12.4:1
- Colors: Blue; White
- Athletics conference: Colonial Valley Conference (general); West Jersey Football League (football)
- Team name: Blue Devils
- Newspaper: The Ewing Voice
- Yearbook: Clepsydra
- Website: ehs.ewing.k12.nj.us

Ewing High School is a four-year comprehensive public high school that serves students in ninth through twelfth grades from Ewing Township, in Mercer County, in the U.S. state of New Jersey, operating as the lone secondary school of the Ewing Public Schools.

As of the 2024–25 school year, the school had an enrollment of 1,118 students and 90.3 classroom teachers (on an FTE basis), for a student–teacher ratio of 12.4:1. There were 518 students (46.3% of enrollment) eligible for free lunch and 114 (10.2% of students) eligible for reduced-cost lunch.

== History ==
The school opened in September 1951 with an enrollment of 665 students in seventh through tenth grades in a facility constructed on a site covering 23 acres (9.3 ha) on Parkway Avenue. Prior to the school's opening, students from Ewing Township had been sent to attend Trenton Central High School as part of a sending/receiving relationship.

== Awards, recognition and rankings ==
The school was the 252nd-ranked public high school in New Jersey out of 339 schools statewide in New Jersey Monthly magazine's September 2014 cover story on the state's "Top Public High Schools," using a new ranking methodology. The school had been ranked 212th in the state of 328 schools in 2012, after being ranked 258th in 2008 out of 316 schools. The school was ranked 196th in the magazine's September 2006 issue, which surveyed 316 schools across the state.

== Curriculum ==
Academically, Ewing High School operates on an intensive block schedule, which allows students the opportunity to take eight courses (40 credits) a year, four classes during each semester. Each instructional block is 87 minutes, with an average teacher-student ratio of 1 to 11. Included in the 140-credit requirement are four courses in English, four in science, three in math, three in history, and one in a world language (French, Spanish, or Italian)—all offered on four ability levels. The school offered over 225 courses during the 2006–07 school year, including a new computer science course sequence.

The school's Senior Experience program allows students the option of being dually enrolled at local colleges and universities, completing an internship at a local business, school, or government organization, or participating in a supervised work experience during their senior year. Each year several students are selected to attend the Princeton University Preparatory Program and the Sarnoff Corporation's Dixon Mentoring in Engineering Program.

Of the 231 students in the 2005 graduating class, 71% were accepted to over 150 colleges and universities nationwide, with the balance moving on to technical schools, the military, or employment. 12 graduated as Edward J. Bloustein Distinguished Scholars for 2006-2007.

== Extracurricular activities ==
Clubs offered include Anime Club, Drama Club, Athletic Club, Cheerleaders, Coffee for the Soul, Debate Team, EITC, Environmental Club, Forza Ewing, French Club, Frescoes, Gay-Straight Alliance, Handbell Choir, Key Club, Junior State of America, Math Club, National Honor Society, Newspaper, Odyssey of the Mind, REBEL, Renaissance, a FIRST Robotics team, Rotary Interact Club, FBLA, SADD, School Show, Sign Language Club, Spanish Club, Spring Musical, Step Team, Student Government, and Yearbook.

== Music program ==
Ewing High also offers a comprehensive music program that includes orchestra, jazz band, marching band, choir, and Mastersingers. Their string orchestra includes instruments such as violin, viola, cello, and double bass. In the marching band the main instruments are the flute, oboe, clarinet, trumpet, tuba, trombone, and drums. The jazz band and Mastersingers are groups that meet outside of school hours, while orchestra, marching band, and choir all have designated classes that meet every other day during school.

== Athletics ==
The Ewing High School Blue Devils compete in the Patriot Division of the Colonial Valley Conference, which is comprised of public and private high schools located in Mercer, Middlesex, and Monmouth counties and operates under the supervision of the New Jersey State Interscholastic Athletic Association (NJSIAA). With 844 students in grades 10–12, the school was classified by the NJSIAA for the 2019–20 school year as Group III for most athletic competition purposes, which included schools with an enrollment of 761 to 1,058 students in that grade range. The football team competes in the Capitol Division of the 94-team West Jersey Football League superconference and was classified by the NJSIAA as Group III South for football for 2024–2026, which included schools with 695 to 882 students.

Interscholastic athletics include 19 different sports available at a variety of levels (freshman, junior varsity, and varsity). Sports programs offered at the school include (B=Boys', G=Girls', C=Coed):

- Fall: Cheerleading (C), Cross Country (B, G), Field Hockey (G), Football (B, G), Soccer (B, G) and Tennis (G)
- Winter: Basketball (B, G), Bowling (C), Cheerleading (C), Swimming (B, G), Winter Track (C), Wrestling (C)
- Spring: Baseball (B), Golf (C), Lacrosse (B, G), Softball (G), Tennis (B), Track (B, G)

The school participates with Hightstown High School in a joint ice hockey team in which Ewing High School acts as the host school / lead agency. The co-op program operates under agreements scheduled to expire at the end of the 2023–24 school year.

The boys' bowling team was the overall state title in 1967, and was the Group II state champion in 2007, 2008, 2013, and 2014. The five state titles are ranked third among all schools in the state.

The boys soccer team was the Group IV co-champion in 1968 (with Hackensack High School) and was Group III co-champion in 1975 (with Tenafly High School). The 1968 team finished the season with a 13-4-4 record after a 1-1 tie with Hackensack in the Group IV championship game left both teams as co-champions. The 1975 team had a 17-3-1 record for the season after earning a co-championship following a 0-0 tie against Tenafly in the Group III tournament final.

The girls' field hockey team won the Central Jersey Group IV state sectional championships in 1977.

The football team has won the NJSIAA Central Jersey Group III state sectional title in 1981, beating Somerville High School 21-18, and in 1985 with a 3-0 win versus Colonia High School.

The girls bowling team won the overall state championship in 1984. The 2020 team won the Central Jersey Group II sectional title, the program's first. The 2022 team edged Barnegat High School by 62 pins to win the Group III state championship, after placing second in the Central Jersey Group II sectional finals.

The boys' basketball team, under coach Emil Wandishin, won the New Jersey State Group III championships in 1986 (defeating Clifford Scott High School in the finals) and 1992 (vs. Orange High School), and won the Group II title in 2012 (vs. Pascack Valley High School). The team used four late foul shots in the waning seconds of the championship game to take the 1992 Group III title with a 54-51 win against Orange High School in the tournament final. The team won the Central Jersey Group III sectional title in 2000, with a 38-35 win over Wall High School. The team also won the 2007 Central, Group II state championship, topping Somerville High School 57-43. The team went on to win the 2011 Central Jersey Group II state championship, defeating Raritan High School 44-42. They went on to lose in the NJSIAA Group II state final to Newark Central by a score of 66-58. The 2012 team won the Group II state title with a 59-50 win against Pascack Valley High School in the tournament final, making Shelley Dearden the first woman to coach a boys' basketball team to a state championship.

The 1991 girls soccer team won its share of the Group III state championship after a 1-1 tie against Northern Highlands Regional High School in the tournament final.

The girls' basketball team won the Group III state championship in 1999 (defeating Sparta High School in the finals) and in 2023 (vs. Randolph High School). The 1999 team defeated Sparta by a score of 54-41 in the tournament final and advanced to the Tournament of Champions as the fourth seed, beating fifth-seed Haddonfield Memorial High School 59-55 in overtime in the first round before falling to number-two St. John Vianney High School 73-47 in the semifinals to finish the season with a record of 25-4. The team won the 2000 Central Jersey Group III sectional championship under coach Shelley Dearden.

The boys' indoor track team won the Group III state title in 2003.

The girls' track team sailed on to victory by placing 6th and becoming All-Americans at the Nike Indoor Nationals in 2005. Jenise Jones placed fourth in the 55m hurdles, making her a two-time All-American.

The girls' track team won the NJSIAA spring / outdoor track state championship in Group II in 2008 (as co-champion).

The softball team won the 2014 Central Jersey Group III sectional championship under coach Dan Bernoski, the team's first sectional title since 1981.

== Administration ==
The school's principal is Lisa Sabo. Her core administration includes two assistant principals.

== Notable alumni ==
- Mike Aponte (class of 1988 valedictorian), former member of the MIT Blackjack Team
- Terrance Bailey (born 1965), professional basketball player
- Peggy Blackford (1942–2024), American Ambassador to Guinea-Bissau from 1995 until relations were suspended in June 1998
- Al Clark (born 1948), former professional baseball umpire who worked in 3,392 major league games in his 26-year career
- John Coates Jr. (1938–2017), jazz pianist, composer and arranger
- Richie Cole (1948–2020), jazz musician
- Hollis Copeland (born 1955), former basketball player with the New York Knicks
- Gerry Davis (born 1958), former Major League Baseball outfielder who appeared in 49 games over parts of two seasons for the San Diego Padres
- Ben DeJesus, documentary filmmaker, television director and producer
- Dudley Dorival (born 1975, class of 1993), athlete in the 110m hurdles who finished seventh at the 2000 Olympic Games and third at the 2001 World Championships, and holds the national record in this event for Haiti
- Janis Hirsch (born c. 1950, class of 1968), comedy writer best known for producing and writing for television series
- Wayne Krenchicki (1954–2018, class of 1972), former MLB third baseman
- Kenneth Lampl (born 1964, class of 1982), film composer, choral composer and academic
- Steve Shimko (born 1990), American football coach and former player who is the quarterbacks coach for the Dallas Cowboys
- Bonnie Watson Coleman (born 1945), politician who has served as the U.S. representative for New Jersey's 12th congressional district since 2015
