= Ewingville, New Jersey =

Populated place in Mercer County, New Jersey, US

- Unincorporated community
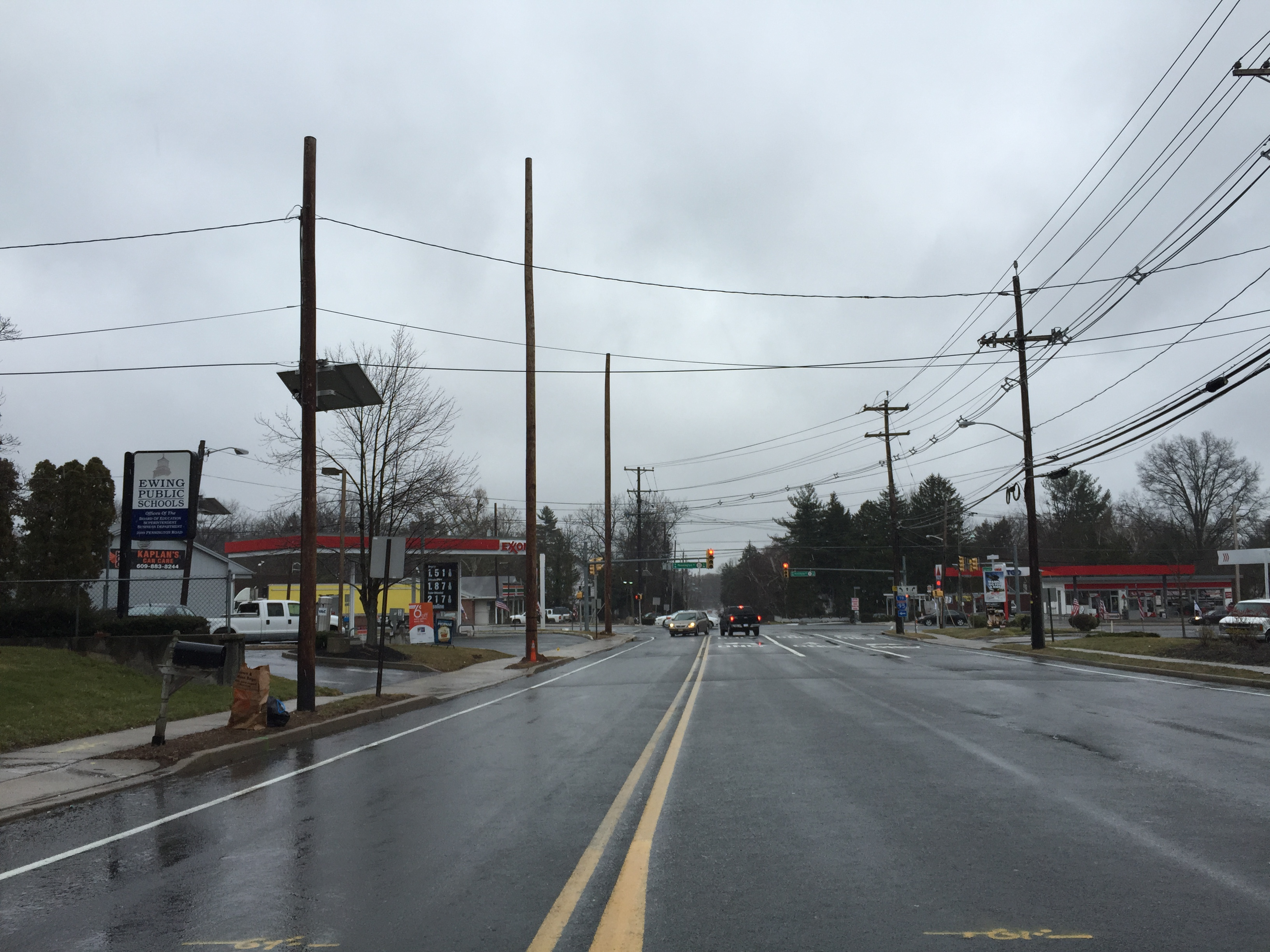
- The main intersection in Ewingville as it appeared in 2016

- Location within Mercer County, New Jersey Location within New Jersey Location within the United States
- Coordinates: 40°16′37″N 74°46′51″W
- Country: United States
- State: New Jersey
- County: Mercer
- Township: Ewing
- Elevation: 138 ft (42 m)
- GNIS feature ID: 876251

Ewingville is a section of Ewing Township in Mercer County, in the U.S. state of New Jersey originally settled as a village on Shabakunk Creek. Located at the intersection of Ewingville Road/Upper Ferry Road and Pennington Road, it is one of the oldest settlements in Ewing Township and dates back to the 18th century. The community was known as Cross Keys before adopting its current name in 1836, two years after the incorporation of Ewing Township in 1834.
