= Ewing Public Schools =

School district in Mercer County, New Jersey, US

Address
- 1331 Lower Ferry Road Ewing Township, Mercer County, New Jersey, 08618; United States
- Coordinates: 40.273959°N 74.792198°W

District information
- Grades: Pre-K to 12
- Superintendent: David Gentile
- Business administrator: Dennis Nettleton
- Schools: 5

Students and staff
- Enrollment: 3,444 (as of 2020–21)
- Faculty: 333.0 FTEs
- Student–teacher ratio: 10.3:1

Other information
- District Factor Group: DE
- Website: www.ewing.k12.nj.us
Ind.	Per pupil	District spending	Rank (*)	K–12 average	%± vs. average
1A	Total Spending	$20,290	74	$18,891	7.4%
1	Budgetary Cost	15,265	65	14,783	3.3%
2	Classroom Instruction	9,156	70	8,763	4.5%
6	Support Services	2,000	32	2,392	−16.4%
8	Administrative Cost	1,422	47	1,485	−4.2%
10	Operations & Maintenance	1,799	67	1,783	0.9%
13	Extracurricular Activities	301	73	268	12.3%
16	Median Teacher Salary	61,696	33	64,043
Data from NJDoE 2014 Taxpayers' Guide to Education Spending. *Of K–12 districts with more than 3,500 students. Lowest spending=1; Highest=103

The Ewing Public Schools is a comprehensive community public school district that serve students in pre-kindergarten through twelfth grade from Ewing Township, in Mercer County, in the U.S. state of New Jersey.

As of the 2020–21 school year, the district, comprising five schools, had an enrollment of 3,444 students and 333.0 classroom teachers (on an FTE basis), for a student–teacher ratio of 10.3:1.

The district is classified by the New Jersey Department of Education as being in District Factor Group "DE", the fifth-highest of eight groupings. District Factor Groups organize districts statewide to allow comparison by common socioeconomic characteristics of the local districts. From lowest socioeconomic status to highest, the categories are A, B, CD, DE, FG, GH, I and J.

The Ewing Public Education Foundation, established in 1995, is an independent, not-for-profit citizen's organization helping improve the quality of education in Ewing Township. EPEF provides grants to Ewing Township Schools for innovative educational programs through fund-raising activities, and corporate and institutional sponsorship. The foundation also seeks to match corporate and organizational donors with teachers to fund additional projects of mutual interest.

== History ==
A court case filed in 1946 challenged a policy of the Ewing Public Schools under which the district provided bus transportation to students living in the districts who attended private parochial schools. In Everson v. Board of Education, the Supreme Court of the United States ruled for the first time that state and local government were subject to the Establishment Clause of the First Amendment to the United States Constitution, but that it had not been violated in this instance.

== Schools ==
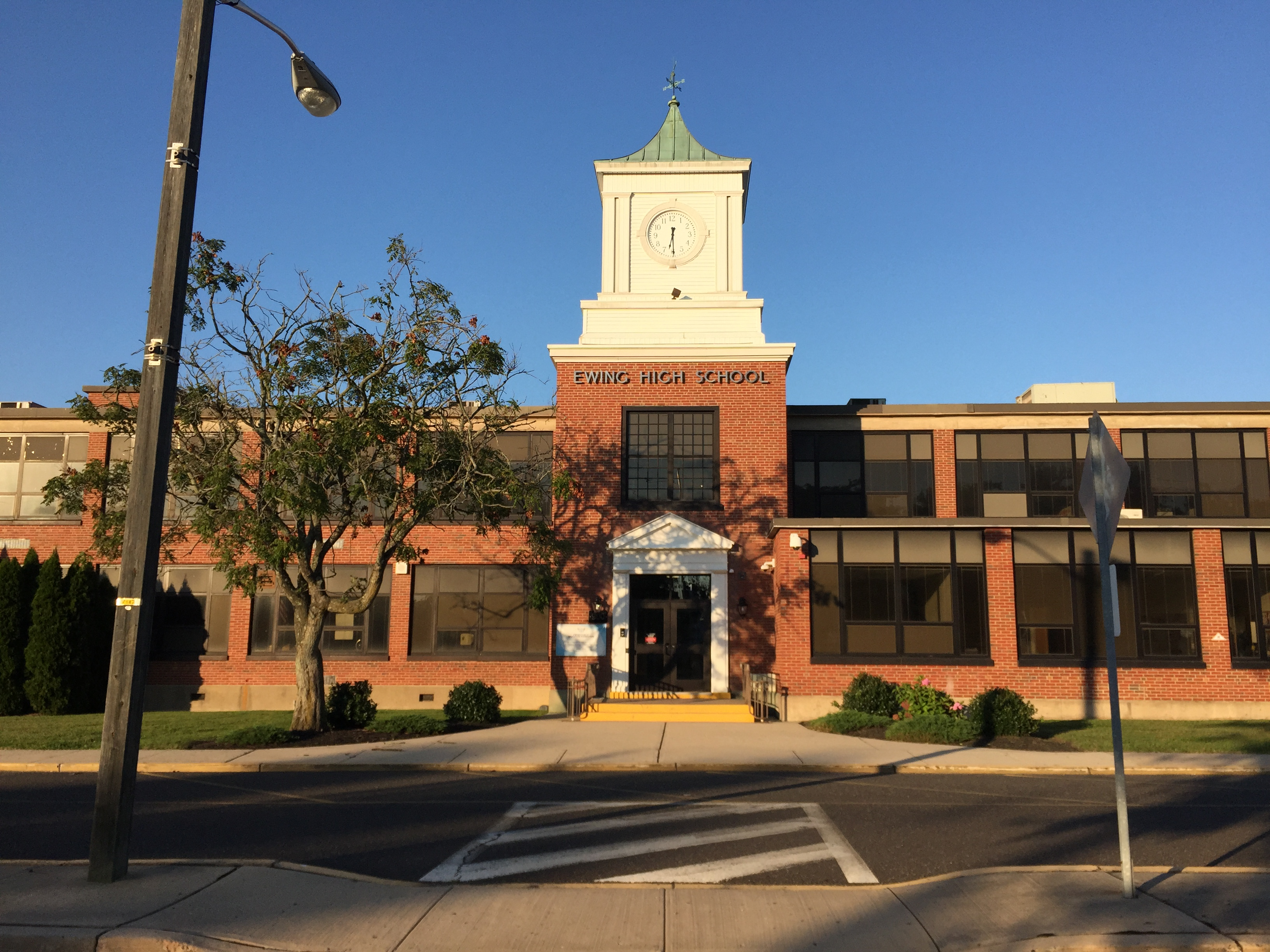
Ewing High School

Schools in the district (with 2020–21 enrollment data from the National Center for Education Statistics) are:

Elementary schools

- W. L. Antheil Elementary School with 623 students in grades PreK-5
  - Clifford "Kip" Harrison, principal
- Francis Lore Elementary School with 500 students in grades K–5
  - Kelly Kawalek, principal
- Parkway Elementary School with 358 students in grades K–5
  - Michelle Conway, principal

Middle school

- Gilmore J. Fisher Middle School with 827 students in grades 6–8
  - Maggy Hanna, principal

High school

- Ewing High School with 1,080 students in grades 9–12
  - Edward Chmiel, principal

== Administration ==
Core members of the district's administration are:

- David Gentile, superintendent
- Dennis Nettleton, business administrator and board secretary

== Board of education ==
The district's board of education comprises members who set policy and oversee the fiscal and educational operation of the district through its administration. As a Type II school district, the board's trustees are elected directly by voters to serve three-year terms of office on a staggered basis, with three seats up for election each year held (since 2012) as part of the November general election. The board appoints a superintendent to oversee the district's day-to-day operations and a business administrator to supervise the business functions of the district.
