= Ewing Covenant Presbyterian Church =

Church in Ewing, New Jersey

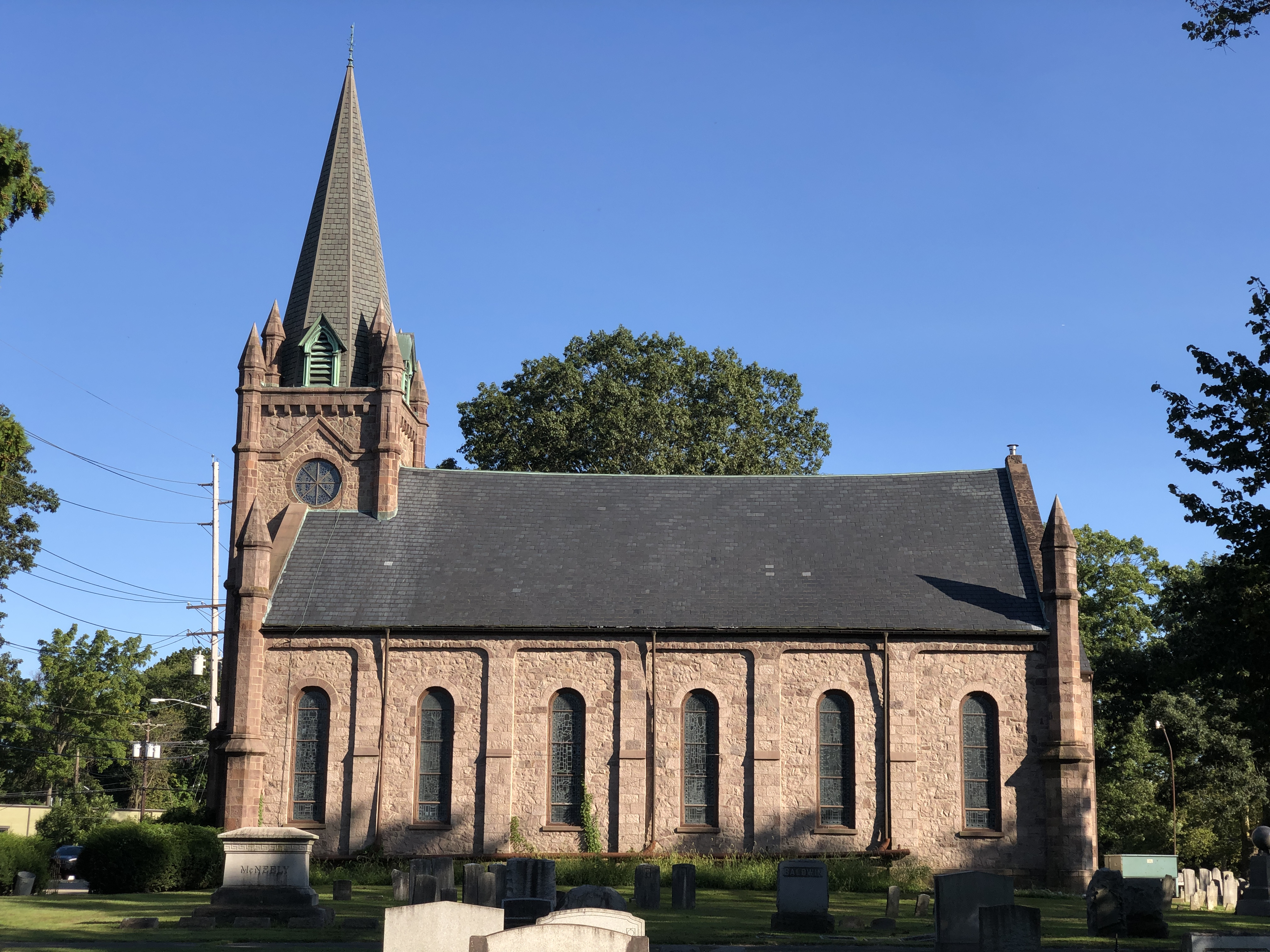
- Ewing Covenant Presbyterian Church
- 40°16′16″N 74°47′59″W
- Address: 100 Scotch Rd, Ewing, NJ 08628
- Denomination: Presbyterian Church (USA)
- Website: ewingcovenant.org

History
- Former name(s): First Presbyterian Church of Ewing; Covenant Presbyterian Church
- Founded: 1709

Clergy
- Pastor: Rev. Morgan Valencia King

Ewing Covenant Presbyterian Church is a Presbyterian Church (U.S.A.) church located in Ewing, New Jersey. The church was formed through the merger of Ewing Presbyterian Church and Covenant Presbyterian Church of Trenton in 2020.

== History ==
=== Origins ===
Organized Presbyterian activity in the area began in 1709, culminating in the First Presbyterian Church of Ewing. The church was at one point led by John Witherspoon, a signer of the Declaration of Independence, president of Princeton University, and an enslaver. Throughout the eighteenth and nineteenth centuries, the First Presbyterian Church of Ewing played a central role in the religious and civic life of the community. The present stone sanctuary, completed in 1867, replaced earlier structures. The sanctuary is considered a historic landmark by Ewing Township.

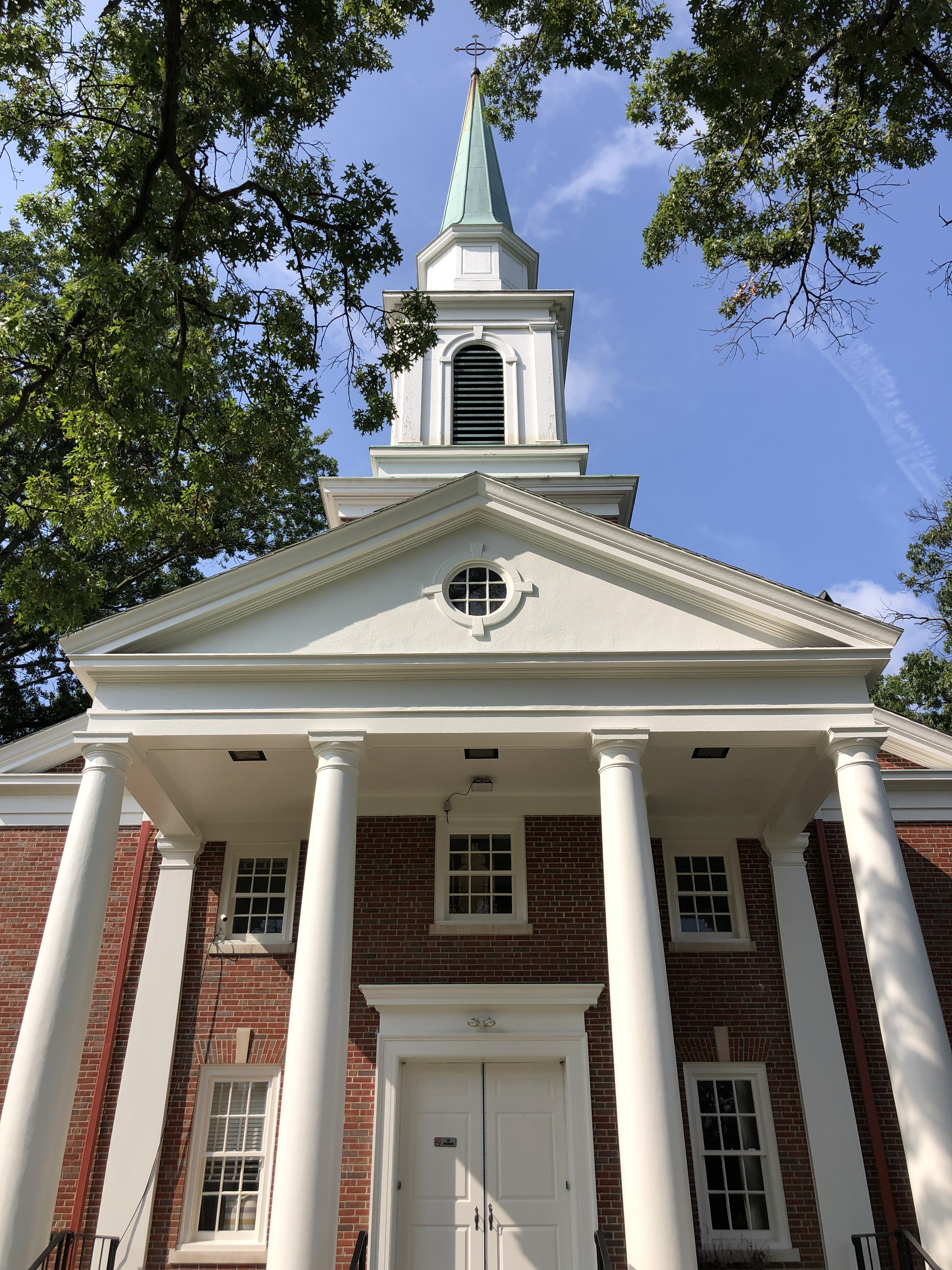
Former sanctuary of Covenant Presbyterian Church

Covenant Presbyterian Church originated in 1947 through the merger of Third Presbyterian Church (founded in 1849) and Fifth Presbyterian Church (founded in 1874) of Trenton, NJ. Another congregation, Mount Carmel Presbyterian Church (founded in 1914) joining one year later. In the 2010s, Covenant deepened its partnerships with First Presbyterian Church of Ewing, initially sharing a youth group before worshipping together and eventually merging as one congregation.

=== Decline and preservation ===
In the 2000s, First Presbyterian Church in Ewing faced significant challenges relating to a controversy regarding the building. In 2007, the sanctuary was closed due to allegations of serious deterioration. Ownership and stewardship passed through the presbytery, and demolition was at one point considered. However, through a lease arrangement with Preservation New Jersey supporters of the sanctuary were able to secure grants, stabilize the structure, and repurpose the site as a cultural and community arts center. In the following years concerts, lectures, exhibitions, and community events were held in the space.

Demolition of the sanctuary was prevented after a commission review in 2010. The building was given historic designation by the State of New Jersey.

In 2023, Preservation New Jersey concluded its lease, reverting stewardship of the sanctuary back to the congregation. The congregation returned to worshipping in the building, resuming regular worship while continuing to host cultural and community events.

=== Merger ===
Amid these difficulties at First Presbyterian Church of Ewing, Covenant Presbyterian Church began worshipping with them which culminated in a formal merger in 2020. In 2023, Ewing Covenant called Rev. Morgan Valencia King as its pastor.

== Ewing Church Cemetery ==
On the church's property is the Ewing Church Cemetery, one of the oldest burial grounds in Mercer County. In 1966, the cemetery was recognized as a historical marker by the state of New Jersey's Historical Commission.
