= Jermaine Hall =

American basketball player

Free agent
- Position: Forward

Personal information
- Born: November 24, 1980 (age 45) Dublin, Georgia, U.S.
- Listed height: 6 ft 5 in (1.96 m)
- Listed weight: 220 lb (100 kg)

Career information
- High school: Dublin (Dublin, Georgia)
- College: Wagner (1999–2003)
- NBA draft: 2003: undrafted
- Playing career: 2004–present

Career history
- 2004: AZS Koszalin
- 2004–2005: Braga Baloncesto
- 2005–2008: Hapoel Gilboa/Afula
- 2008–2009: Elitzur Givat Shmuel
- 2009–2010: Hapoel Afula
- 2010–2013: Beer Yaakov
- 2013–2014: Ironi Ashkelon
- 2014–2016: Maccabi Ashdod
- 2016-2017: Maccabi Ironi Ramat Gan
- 2017-2018: Hapoel Akko

Career highlights
- NEC Player of the Year (2003); AP honorable mention All-American (2003); 3× First-team All-NEC (2001, 2002, 2003); NEC tournament MVP (2003)

Jermaine Hall (born November 24, 1980) is an American professional basketball player who last played for Maccabi Ashdod of the Israeli Basketball Premier League. He played college basketball for Wagner College.

== College career ==
Hall led the Wagner Seahawks men's basketball to the NCAA Tournament where he won the NEC Player of the Year, All-NEC First Team, was the NEC Tournament MVP and made the NEC All-Tournament Team.

== Professional career ==
After graduating from Wagner College in 2003, he tried out for several teams in the USA before moving to Europe. After competing in Portugal he spent the past twelve seasons in Israel competing in both the first and second divisions. Was playing for Maccabi Ashdod. Currently plays for Nof HaGalil's basketball team, Hapoel Nof HaGalil, which plays in the IBA fourth tier, Liga Alef. Hall is coaching in the young and youth club of Hapoel Nof HaGalil.
