= Charles Ewing (politician) =

American judge

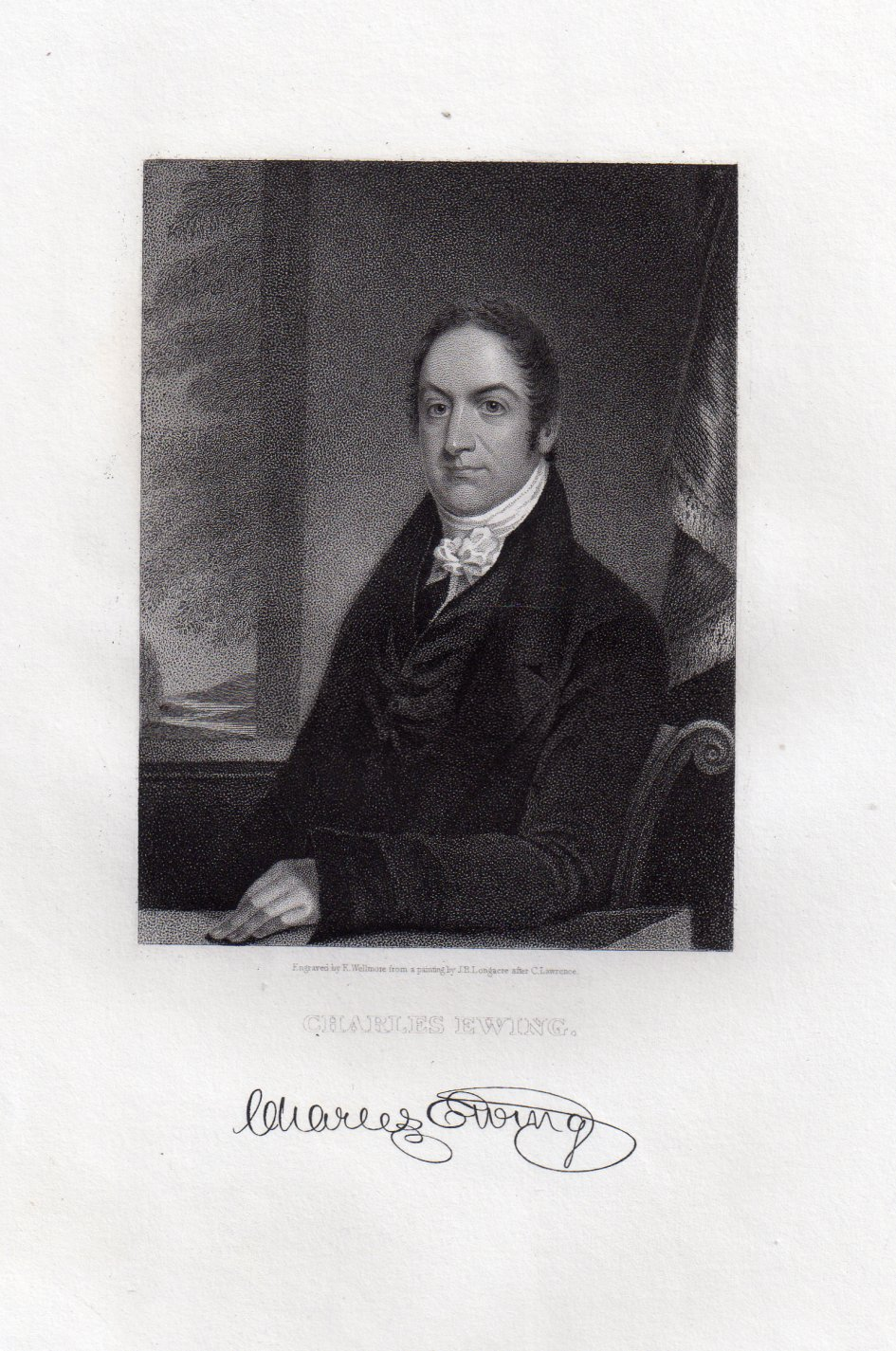
- Portrait of Ewing by C.Lawrence dated 1834
- Born: June 8, 1780; Bridgeton, New Jersey, US
- Died: August 5, 1832 (aged 52); Trenton, New Jersey, US
- Title: Chief Justice of the New Jersey Supreme Court
- Term: 1824–1832

Charles Ewing (June 8, 1780 – August 5, 1832) was an American politician from New Jersey, who served as Chief Justice of the New Jersey Supreme Court.

Ewing graduated from the College of New Jersey (now Princeton University) in 1798 and then moved to Trenton to study law with Samuel Leake, a local lawyer. He was licensed as an attorney in November 1802, as a counselor in 1805, and called to the degree of sergeant-at-law in 1812. Ewing was the recorder for the City of Trenton, ran unsuccessfully for the New Jersey Legislature in 1815, was a commissioner to revise the laws of New Jersey in 1819, and the director of the Trenton Banking Company in 1821 and 1823-1824. Ewing was appointed as Chief Justice of the New Jersey Supreme Court in 1824 and was reelected to that post shortly before his death from cholera in 1832. Ewing married Eleanor Graeme Armstrong, daughter of the Rev. James Francis Armstrong, and they had two daughters and two sons.

Ewing Township, formed on February 22, 1834, was named for him. Princeton University's Ewing Professorship of Greek Language and Literature was also named in his honor.
