= Terrance Bailey =

American basketball player (born 1965)

Personal information
- Born: July 3, 1965 (age 61) Newark, New Jersey, U.S.
- Listed height: 6 ft 2 in (1.88 m)
- Listed weight: 180 lb (82 kg)

Career information
- High school: Ewing (Ewing Township, New Jersey)
- College: Wagner (1983–1987)
- NBA draft: 1987: 2nd round, 42nd overall pick
- Drafted by: Atlanta Hawks
- Position: Shooting guard

Career history
- 1989: Presto Ice Cream Makers

Career highlights
- NCAA scoring champion (1986); NEC Player of the Year (1986); 3× First-team All-NEC (1985–1987)
- Stats at Basketball Reference

Terrance Bailey (born July 3, 1965) is an American former basketball player who led NCAA Division I in scoring as a junior in 1985–86. A native of Newark, New Jersey, Bailey played at Wagner College for four years and established himself as one of the Northeast Conference's all-time greatest players.

Raised in Ewing Township, New Jersey, Baily played prep basketball at Ewing High School.

Bailey played in 110 career games for the Wagner Seahawks and scored a conference record 2,591 points, nearly 300 more than the next closest player. In his NCAA-leading junior season, he averaged 29.4 points per game, was named the Northeast Conference Player of the Year, an honorable mention All-American and was in his second of an unmatched three consecutive first team all-conference seasons. He once had back-to-back 40 point games and was named Sports Illustrated's Player of the Week. The New York Metropolitan Basketball Writers Association twice named him to their All-Met team. After his collegiate career ended, Bailey was selected in the second round (42nd overall) of the 1987 NBA draft by the Atlanta Hawks but never got to play in the league. He then played overseas, notably with the Presto Tivolis, in the Philippine Basketball Association in 1989.

As of 2013, he lived in Trenton where he worked as a pre-school teacher. He was awarded a bachelor's degree in 2021 from Wagner College with a major in education and minors in speech and theater.

== See also ==
- List of NCAA Division I men's basketball season scoring leaders
- List of NCAA Division I men's basketball career scoring leaders
