= List of NJ Transit bus routes (600–699) =

New Jersey Transit Mercer, Inc.
- #5537 operates on the 619 in Trenton.
- Parent: New Jersey Transit Bus Operations
- Locale: Mercer County, New Jersey
- Service type: Local bus transit
- Routes: 14
- Operator: New Jersey Transit Bus Operations
- Website: New Jersey Transit

New Jersey Transit Bus Operations, under the NJ Transit Mercer, Inc. subsidiary, as successor to Mercer Metro on July 1, 1984, operates the following routes within Mercer County, New Jersey.

== Routes ==
All routes are exact fare lines and are operated out of the Hamilton Township garage. Routes labeled Capital Connection travel along State Street between Trenton Transit Center and the New Jersey State House.

Route	Terminals		Major Streets	Notes	History
600	Trenton Transit Center	Plainsboro	Route 1	Extended to Nassau Park on April 5th, 2003.; Extended to Princeton Medical Center on May 12th, 2012.; Extended in Plainsboro to The Crossings Apartments, Plainsboro Village, and Cranbury Brook Senior Housing on September 5th, 2015.	Former Route E; Service initiated on September 16th, 1985.
601	The College of New Jersey	Hamilton Marketplace	State Street; Clinton Avenue; Kuser Road	Capital Connection route	Former Route G; Extended to Hamilton Marketplace on January 4th, 2003.; Service to Project Freedom discontinued on January 8th, 2005.; Seasonal Trenton school service discontinued on April 4th, 2015.
603	Mercer Mall	Hamilton Square	Princeton/Brunswick Pike; Broad Street; White Horse Avenue		Former Route K; Quaker Bridge Plaza service discontinued on September 21st, 1985.; Extended to Hamilton Marketplace on January 4, 2003.; Extended to RWJU Hamilton Hospital on January 8, 2005.; Service via Yardville split into 613 on January 12, 2008.
605	Quaker Bridge Mall	Montgomery Township	Route 1 Witherspoon Street; Route 206		Former Route M; Extended to Montgomery in 1991.; Evening service to Griggs Farm discontinued on January 28th, 2006.; Service to Stonebridge at Montgomery discontinued on June 26th, 2010.
606	Princeton	Hamilton Marketplace	Harrison Street; Nassau St; Route 206; Greenwood Avenue/Nottingham Way; Washington Boulevard	Capital Connection route; Select trips operate via Hamilton Station.; One trip serves Educational Testing Services in Princeton.	Former Route P; Weekday service to Hamilton Station introduced in 1999.; Extended to Hamilton Marketplace on January 4, 2003.; Extended to Princeton Care Center on May 12th, 2012.; Service to Redding Terrace introduced on September 21st, 1985, then discontinued in 2008.
607	Ewing	Hamilton; Independence Plaza	Parkway Avenue; Broad Street; Lalor Street	Weekend loop service via Pennington Road and Parkway Village service discontinued on September 21st, 1985.; Extended to Delaware Heights Apartment Complex on June 23rd, 2007.	Former Route Q; Formerly served Bear Tavern Loop until June 23rd, 2007.
608	Hopewell; Capital Health Medical Center	Hamilton Station	Trenton-Mercer Airport, Sullivan Way, State Street	Capital Connection route; Select weekday trips operate via River Road and NJ State Police Headquarters.	Former Route S; Formerly served Lambertville from September 21st, 1985 to June 24th, 2006.; Direct service to NJ State Bank discontinued on September 21st, 1985.; Extended to NJ State Police on September 21st, 1985.; Service to East Trenton discontinued in 2000.; Service extended to Trenton-Mercer Airport and Homefront Family Campus on April 3, 2021.; Service extended to Capital Health Medical Center on August 30, 2025.
609	Ewing	Quaker Bridge Mall	Stuyvesant Avenue, Hamilton Avenue, Quaker Bridge Road	Capital Connection route	Former Route T; Service to Mercer Mall discontinued on January 5, 2002.
610	Princeton			Seasonal school service only	Former Princeton School Seasonal route in the 1980's.
611	Trenton Circulator		Perry Street, State Street, Front Street	Weekday service only; Free rides for State of New Jersey employees with ID	Former Route Z; Lunchtime service discontinued in June 2009.
612	Princeton Junction	Lawrence Township	Clarksville Road	Weekday peak hour service only	Renumbered from 976 in June 2010.
613	Mercer Mall	Hamilton Marketplace	Princeton Pike, Brunswick Avenue, Broad Street		Former 603 service via Yardville; split into 613 on January 12, 2008.
619	Ewing	Mercer County Community College	Stuyvesant Avenue, Hamilton Avenue, Edinburgh Road	Capital Connection route; Service operating on Sunday is part of a pilot program effective April 2021.	Introduced in May 2008.
624	Pennington	East Trenton	Pennington Avenue, Perry Street, Clinton Avenue	No Sunday service	Route created on June 20, 2015, to combine former 602 and 604 lines.

=== Former routes ===
Route	Terminals		Major Streets	Notes
A	Trenton	Seaside Heights	Route 206	Discontinued in the 1980's.
R	West Trenton	White Horse	State Street, River Road	Discontinued on September 21st, 1985.
V	Trenton	Fort Dix McGuire AFB	Route 206	Discontinued in the 1980's.
X	Princeton	Hamilton		Discontinued on September 21st, 1985.; Operated as a loop between these two points.; Loop also served Trenton-Mercer Airport
602	Trenton	Pennington	Pennington Avenue	No Sunday service; Saturday service extended to East Trenton via Perry Street; Service to Hopewell discontinued on September 21st, 1985.; Former Route H; Combined into Route 624 on June 20, 2015.
604	Trenton Transit Center	East Trenton	Perry Street, Clinton Avenue	Weekdays only; Sunday service discontinued on September 21st, 1985.; Former Route L; Combined into Route 624 on June 20, 2015.
610	Trenton		State Street	School service only; Trenton High School (2 trips A.M./P.M. only); Former Trenton School Seasonal route in the 1980's.; Discontinued on January 14, 2017.
655 "HealthLine"	Princeton	Plainsboro	University Place; Alexander Road; Route 1 Scudders Mill Road	Began service on May 14, 2012.; Service extended to Eaves Apartments, Princeton Village, and Cranbury Brook Senior Housing on June 21, 2014.; Discontinued on September 1, 2015.; Weekdays only
