= Port Mercer, New Jersey =

Populated place in Mercer County, New Jersey, US

- Unincorporated community
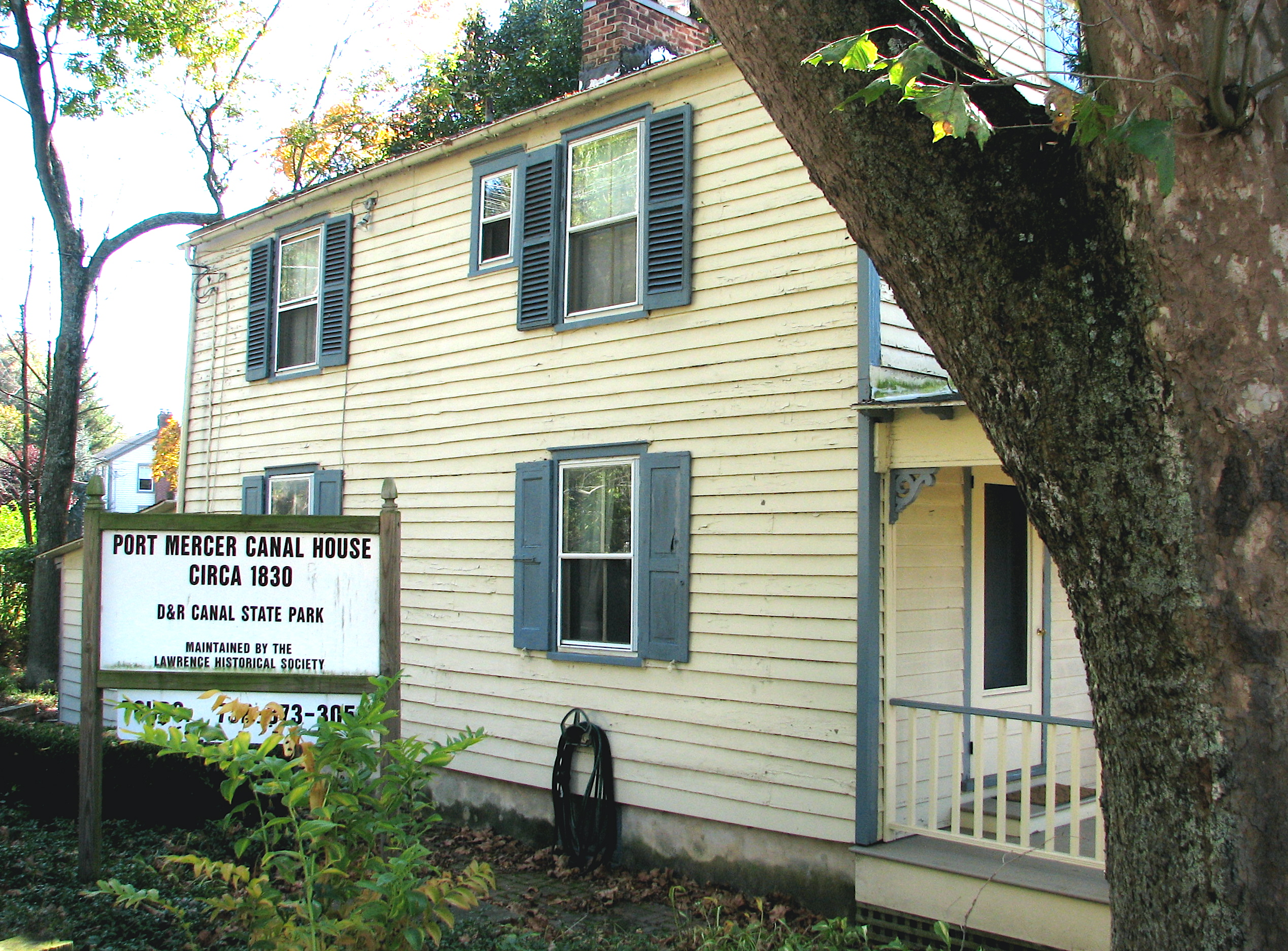
- Port Mercer Canal House

- Location within Mercer County, New Jersey Location within New Jersey Location within the United States
- Coordinates: 40°18′15″N 74°41′06″W
- Country: United States
- State: New Jersey
- County: Mercer
- Township: Lawrence, Princeton and West Windsor
- Elevation: 56 ft (17 m)
- GNIS feature ID: 879438

Port Mercer is an unincorporated community located where the municipal boundaries of Lawrence Township, Princeton and West Windsor Township intersect in Mercer County, in the U.S. state of New Jersey. The community developed in the 19th century along the Delaware and Raritan Canal.

The opening of the canal in 1834 and the arrival of the Camden and Amboy Railroad led to increasing commerce in the area. A turning basin in the nearby waterway became an economic outlet for local farms, leading to the growth of the hamlet around it. The operators of the community's swing bridge lived in the Canal House from the 1840s, during which time a number of houses and commercial establishments were built in the village. In the late 19th and early 20th centuries, the closure of the canal and the relocation of the railway led to economic decline in Port Mercer.

In the 1970s, a number of Port Mercer's buildings were placed on the National Register of Historic Places. The Port Mercer Canal House, which dates to the 1840s, houses a museum operated by the Lawrence Historical society, although the original swing bridge over the canal no longer stands. Also notable is the former Port Mercer Inn, now a private residence. The community is home to a handful of historic homes, including the mid-19th century Uhl-Keith, Uhl, Gordon, and Furman-Marchesi houses. A building housing a general store stood in the village until it was torn down in the 1950s. Two obelisks along Quakerbridge Road mark George Washington's route during the Ten Crucial Days.

== History ==
=== Early history (1777–1834) ===
The area that is now Port Mercer was sparsely populated during the American Revolution, and may have been known as the "Great Meadow". In 1777, George Washington marched through the area with his troops prior to the Battle of Princeton, during the Ten Crucial Days. Two obelisks mark Washington's path through what is now Port Mercer, installed in 1914 by the Sons of the Revolution. Until the 1830s, the area, like much of central New Jersey, was isolated and remained sparse in population beyond farmland concentrated near Clarksville, New Jersey, and Brunswick Pike (now US Route 1).

=== Economic growth (1834–1849) ===
The area's isolation ended with the 1834 opening of the Delaware and Raritan Canal. The growing commercial traffic from the canal, as well as the construction of the Camden and Amboy Railroad along the canal, led to locals settling around a small turning basin, which served as an economic outlet for local farms, and provided residents of the "Clarksville Basin" community with outside amenities such as coal. A swing bridge was constructed over the canal in the 1830s, as was a house for the bridge-tender from 1833 to 1834. Due to a change in the road's alignment, a new canal house, the one that survives today, was built in the 1840s. The original canal house may have survived until the 20th century, and was remembered by locals as "the spring house".

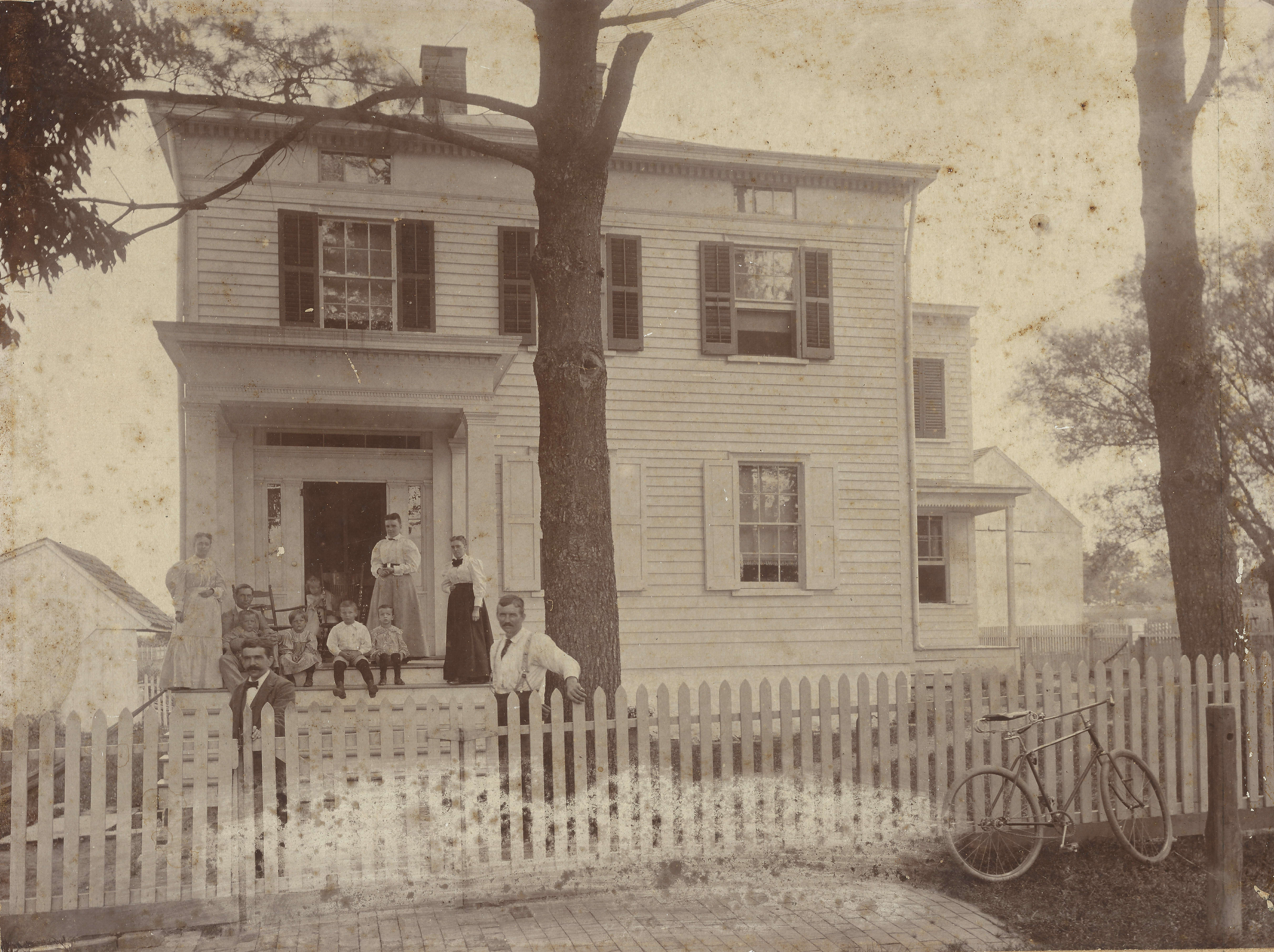
The Gordon-Northrup house, pictured in the 19th century, was constructed between 1840 and 1860

A handful of residential buildings sprang up along Quakerbridge Road prior to 1850, such as the Uhl-Keith and Uhl houses. Lewis Gordon built the Gordon House sometime during the 1840s, and likely built the Furman-Marchesi house around the same time. Residents of what was then also known as Port Windsor established a number of commercial enterprises in the village, such as Charles Gillingham's lumberyard in 1835, Joseph Gillingham's lime kilns by 1840, and Alfred Applegate's general store from about 1840 to 1848.

=== Commercial development (1849–1892) ===
In 1849, the community saw the establishment of a post office, operated by postmaster John A. S. Crater. By this point, the hamlet's name had officially been recognized as Port Mercer. The same year, Crater also established a steam-powered sawmill which may have provided the hamlet with lumber. Crater owned a number of other establishments in the community, including a coal yard, an ice house, and a number of barns. He also operated a blacksmith shop, a shoe store, and came to run the general store that Applegate had operated. The store itself went through multiple local owners in the 19th century. Crater built the Port Mercer Inn on a tract of land he had purchased sometime before 1858. The Inn served both rail and canal traffic, and local rumor suggested it employed prostitutes from Trenton, with the demand exceeding the inn's capacity. Sometime between 1840 and 1860, Crater also built the Gordon-Northrup House. It was owned by Richard Cook until 1868, when the parcel containing the house was sold to the local Gordon family.

A vibrant sense of community developed around the canal in the 19th century. Locals would often try to profit from the traffic on the canal through "a well-timed delay in opening the swing bridge". This would sometimes entangle the tow lines of mules and draw them into the water, where local boys would rescue them for a reward. Locals also set up bottles and other targets along the canal in the hopes that bargemen would recreationally throw coal at them. Children would often wave to passing boats and step on deck when they unloaded. The general store served as the focal point of the community, and was a center for bartering and card games.

=== Decline and preservation (1892–present) ===
As railroad commerce increased and aligned itself to the present-day route of the Northeast Corridor in 1863, the canal declined in commercial use, ceasing to be profitable in 1892. Economic activity in Port Mercer declined during this period, although John F. Schanck bred racehorses on a farm in the community in the late 19th century. The canal eventually closed in 1933 and was taken over by the state. A number of drownings and car crashes into the canal occurred in the early 20th century, and on two separate occasions murder victims were dumped into the water. However, a sense of "neighborhood" persisted in the community, which had been less economically harmed by the canal's decline than neighboring Princeton Basin.

The Port Mercer Inn was likely still functioning in 1871, but was eventually turned into a residence by Richard Cook, who rented it out to the family of future bridge-tender John Arrowsmith. In 1898, the Cook properties passed to David and Kate Flock and then to Charles H. Mather. Mather became a prominent resident of the town, operating the general store, where he sold farm machinery, and an adjacent coal yard until 1915. In 1951, the store eventually passed to the Harlow family, which tore it down in the 1950s, replacing it with a flower garden. The canal house remained a private residence of the Arrowsmith family until 1965. It was used to house New Jersey Water Supply Authority workers throughout the next decade. In 1973, many of Port Mercer's buildings were placed on the National Register of Historic Places as part of the Delaware and Raritan Canal listing, and the following year, the canal was designated a state park.

Widespread farming in the Port Mercer area continued until the construction of residential and commercial projects in the late 20th century. Many of Port Mercer's historic buildings remain standing, and are still used as private residences. The Lawrence Historical Society restored the canal house in 1978 and operates it as a museum.
