= Quaker Bridge Mall =

Shopping mall in New Jersey, US

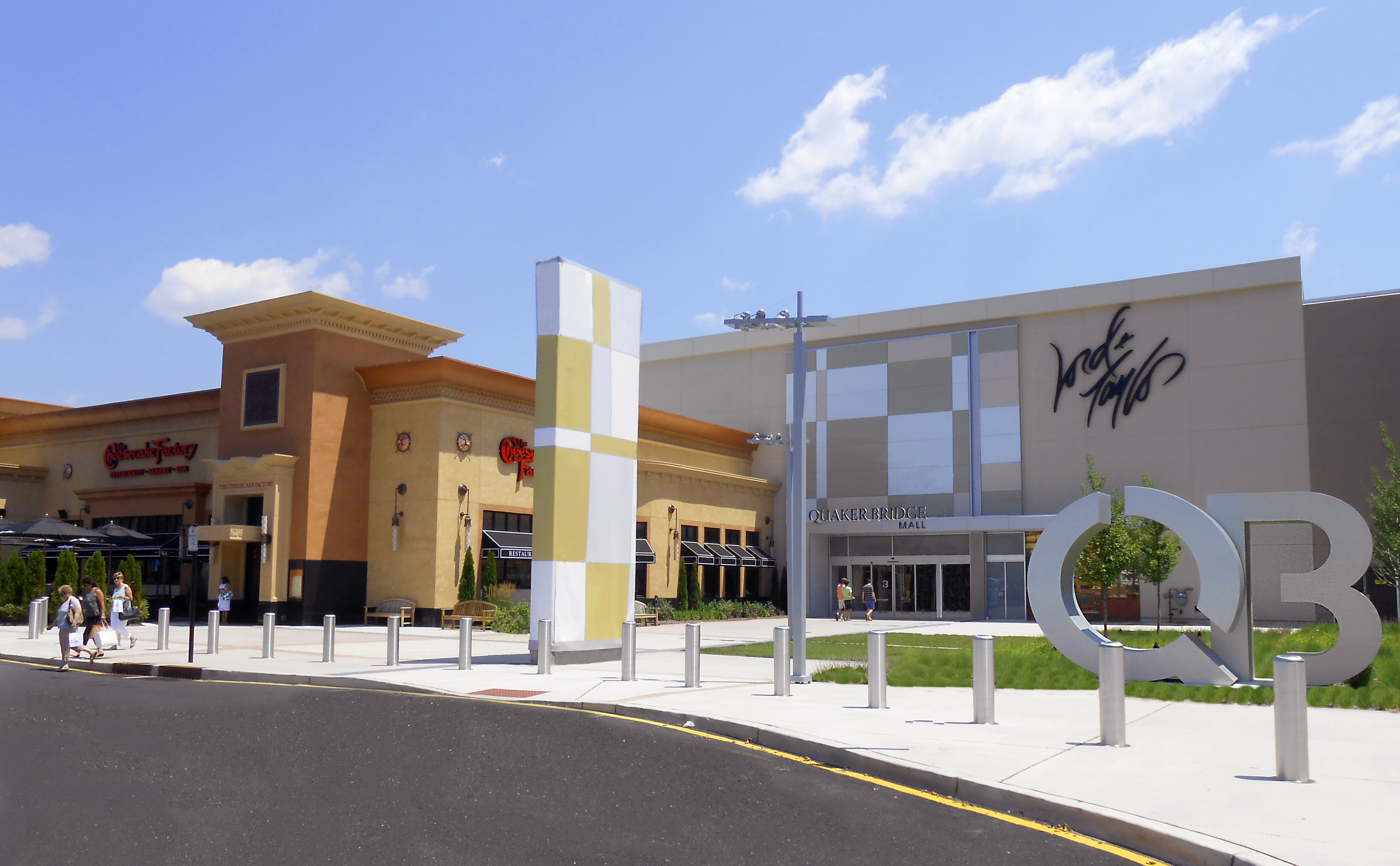
- Entrance near The Cheesecake Factory, 2013
- Location: Lawrence Township, Mercer County, New Jersey
- Coordinates: 40.2906°N 74.6818°W
- Address: 3320 U.S. Route 1 Lawrence Township, NJ 08648
- Opened: 1975
- Developer: The Kravco Company
- Manager: Simon Property Group
- Owner: Simon Property Group (50%)
- Num. of stores: 116
- Num. of anchor tenants: 2
- Floor area: 1,079,542 sq ft (100,292.7 m^{2})
- Floors: 2
- Parking: Parking lot
- Public transit: : NJT Bus: 600, 603, 605, 609, 613 : Princeton University Tiger Transit: Route 5
- Website: www.simon.com/mall/quaker-bridge-mall

Quaker Bridge Mall is a two-level super-regional mall located in the Clarksville section of Lawrence Township, Mercer County, New Jersey. As of 2025, the mall features the traditional anchors Macy's and JCPenney. It also currently features prominent specialty stores such as Coach New York, White House Black Market, and Ann Taylor.

The mall is on U.S. Route 1 near Interstate 295. The mall opened in 1975 and is managed by Simon Property Group (which owns 50% of it). It is also the location of the transmitter for the New Jersey–based radio station WKXW, better known as New Jersey 101.5. The mall has a gross leasable area of 1,084,000 sq ft (100,700 m^{2}), making it one of the larger shopping malls in New Jersey.

== History ==
Quaker Bridge Mall opened in 1975 with two anchors: Bamberger's and Sears. Two other anchors opened in 1976 which were Hahne's that opened on April 1, 1976 and JCPenney that opened on July 28, 1976. The development of the mall helped to spur growth along the Route 1 corridor with the opening of additional shopping and strip centers, as well as the reconstruction of numerous intersections on Route 1 to accommodate the rising levels in traffic.

An AMC four-screen cinema opened February 1977 at the back entrance, under Woolworth's. Anchor store changes took place in 1986 and 1990 when Bamberger's converted to Macy's and the closing of Hahne's allowed for the opening of Lord & Taylor. In 1988–89, the mall was renovated. New flooring was added, new lighting was added, new seating areas added, the child's play area in the Sears wing was removed in favor of a planter and seating area, the majority of the fountains were removed, the mall was painted and the entrances facing Route 1 were redesigned. In the late 1990s, Woolworth's and the movie theater closed.

A proposed 600,000-square-foot (56,000 m^{2}) expansion project in the 2000s would have added Neiman Marcus and Nordstrom, along with as many as 100 new stores and restaurants. Nordstrom's two-level, 144,000-square-foot (13,400 m^{2}) store would have been the fifth Nordstrom store in New Jersey. Neiman Marcus had planned to occupy about 90,000 square feet (8,400 m^{2}) on two levels. The township approved the new JCPenney building and parking deck in 2008. However, neither project was continued in the mall's 2010 renovations.

In October 2010, the mall received approval from Lawrence Township to expand that included a large-scale renovation of the mall, replacing flooring, the escalator in the center court, and adding an elevator in front of Lord & Taylor and escalators in front of JCPenney, with a new food court added on the upper level near Macy’s.

In May 2018, Sears announced that its store would be closing as part of a plan to close 72 stores nationwide. Spirit Halloween has occupied some of the former Sears on the Route 1 side each year since 2022 from August to early November.

In August 2020, Lord & Taylor announced that it would be closing its store at the mall, as part of the chain's nationwide liquidation.

== Gallery ==
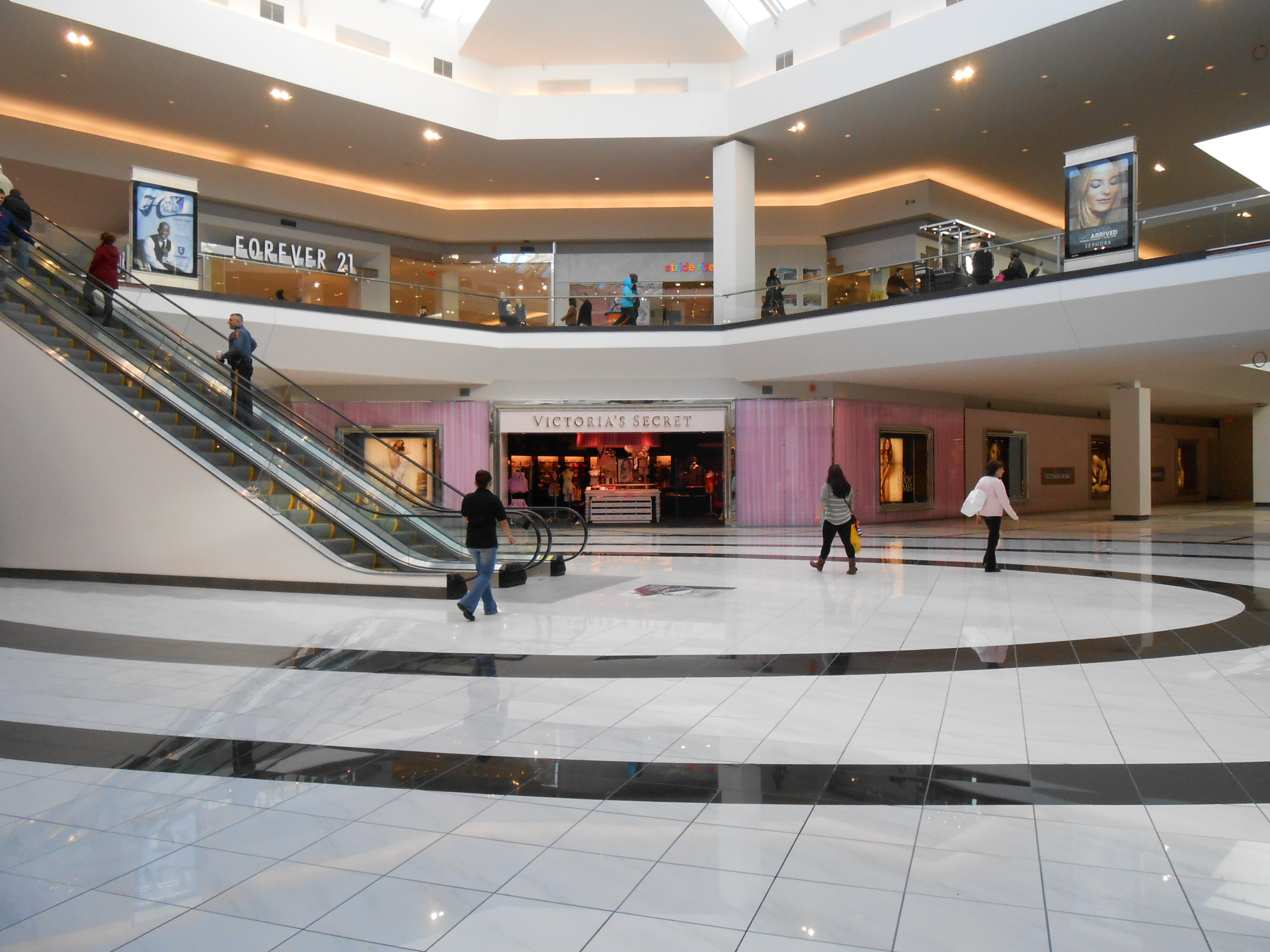
Center court, 2013

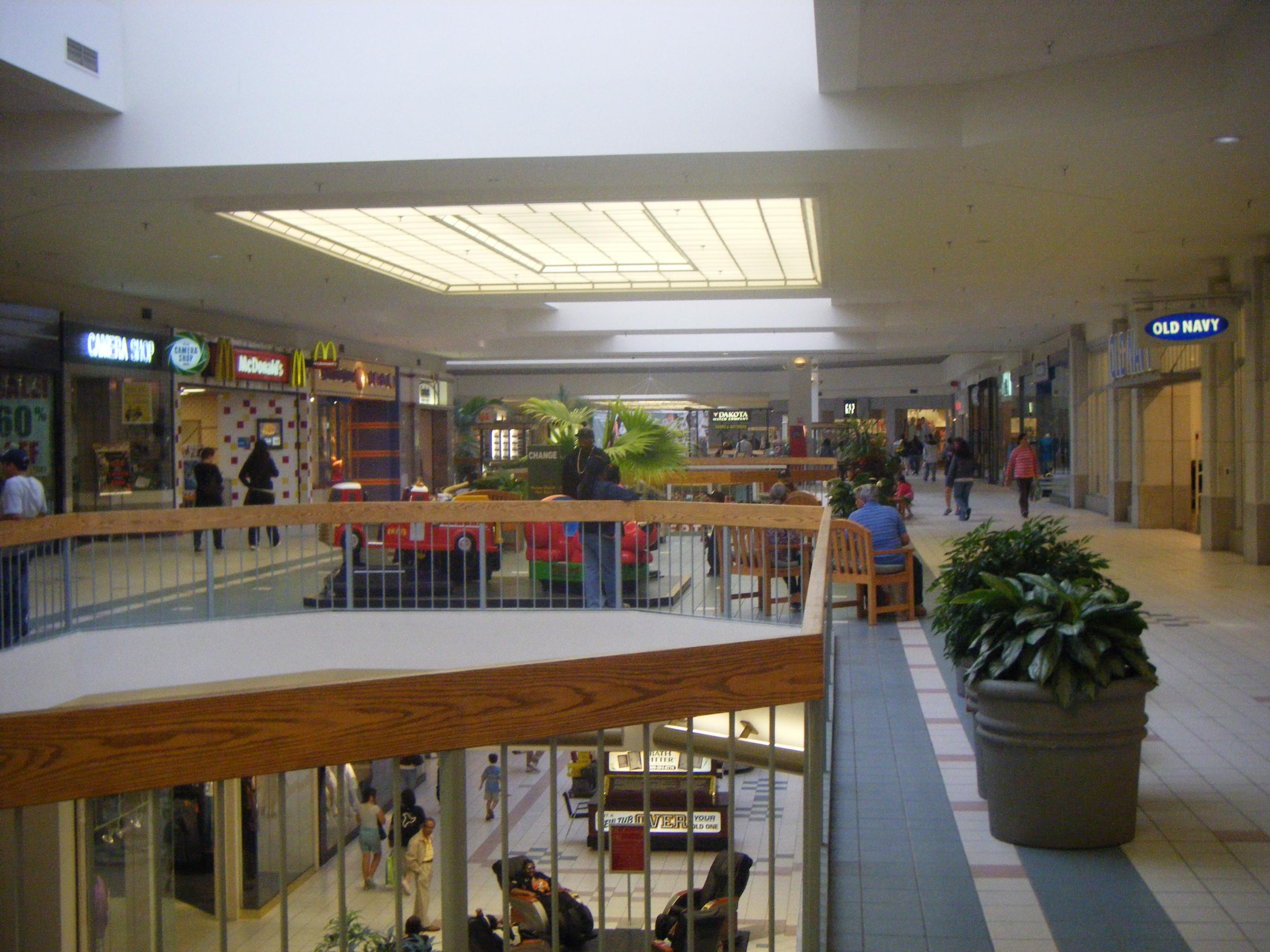
Second floor looking from Sears in 2008, before the mall was renovated
