= Port Mercer Canal House =

Historic house in New Jersey, United States

Coordinates: 40.28665°N 74.69588°W

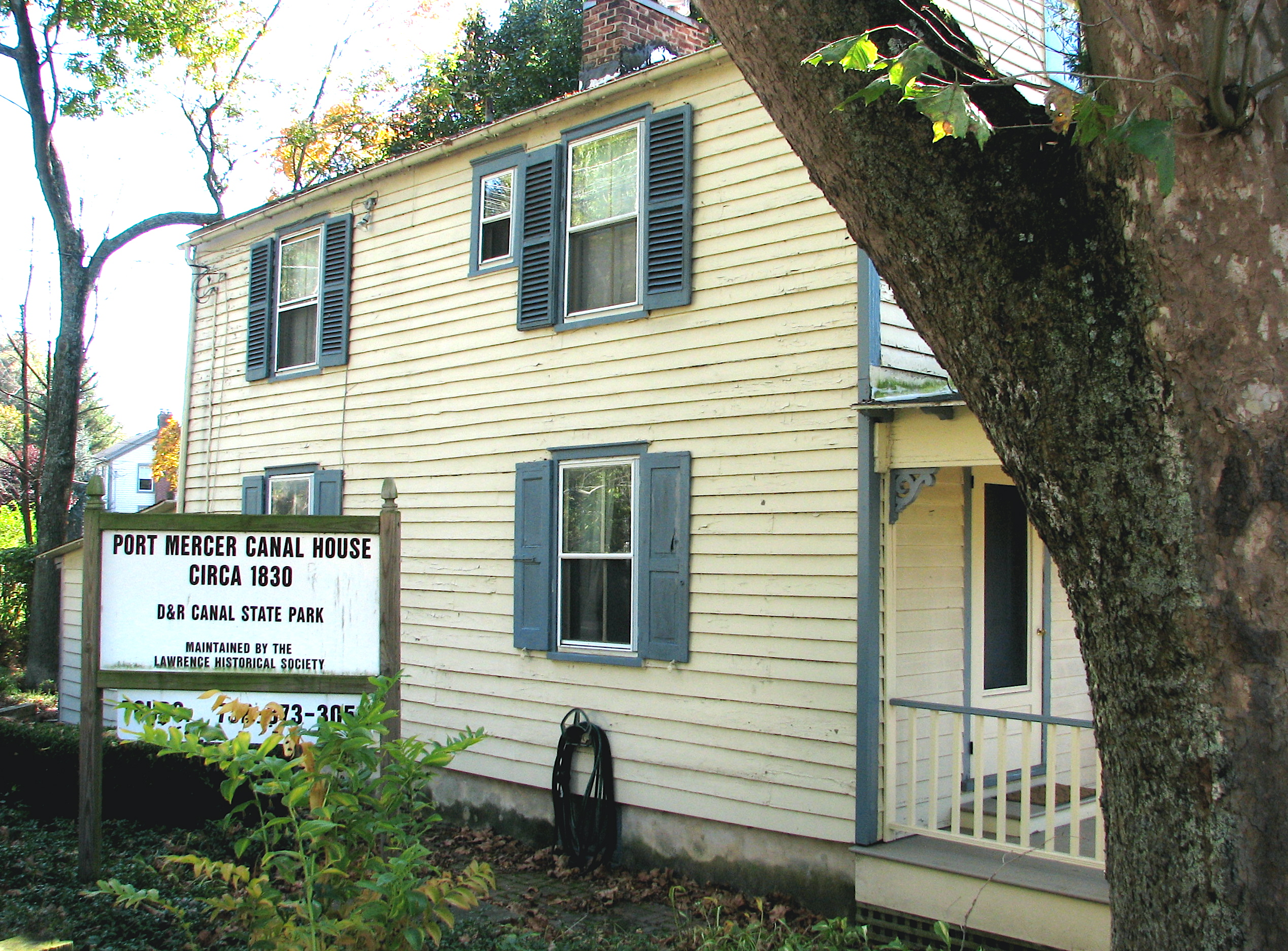
Port Mercer Canal House

The Port Mercer Canal House is a historic house along the Delaware and Raritan Canal. It is located at 4278 Quakerbridge Road in the Port Mercer section of Lawrence Township, Mercer County, New Jersey, United States, near the border of West Windsor Township and Princeton, New Jersey. The house was built in the 1830s as housing for bridgetender and his family. The bridgetender was needed to open the swing bridge when canal boats came through, then close it to allow traffic to cross over the canal. From approximately 1900 to 1934, the bridgetender was John Arrowsmith. He and his wife lived in the three-bedroom house with their eight children. The Arrowsmiths loved living at the house and their children enjoyed sleeping outside by the canal in the summer and skating on the frozen canal to Trenton in the winter. Around 1900, a first-floor kitchen was added. Prior to this addition, Mrs. Arrowsmith, who was known as a good cook, did all of the cooking for the large family and friends by the fireplace in the basement of the house.

The Delaware and Raritan Canal and the canal houses are now part of the New Jersey State Park system. In the 1970s, the Lawrence Historical Society began restoring the Port Mercer Canal House to the 1890-1920 time period. The house and the Port Mercer area are listed on the National Register of Historic Places. Outside of the house, the grounds have been landscaped with small gardens and include an outhouse which was built just before the American Civil War.
