= Hamilton station (NJ Transit) =

NJ Transit rail station

Hamilton
- NJ Transit 4517 at Hamilton in November 2026.

General information
- Location: 600 Sloan Avenue; Hamilton, New Jersey; United States
- Coordinates: 40°15′19″N 74°42′14″W
- Owner: New Jersey Transit
- Line: Amtrak Northeast Corridor
- Platforms: 2 side platforms
- Tracks: 4
- Connections: NJ Transit Bus: 606, 608

Construction
- Parking: 2,066 space garage, 750 space lot
- Cycle facilities: Lockers
- Accessible: Yes

Other information
- Fare zone: 20

History
- Opened: February 21, 1999

Passengers
- 2025: 3,813 (average weekday)
- Rank: 8 of 153

Services
Preceding station	NJ Transit	Following station
Trenton Terminus	Northeast Corridor Line	Princeton Junction toward New York
Location

Hamilton station is an active commuter railroad station and intermodal transit hub in the township of Hamilton, Mercer County, New Jersey. Located on Klockner Road, a branch of Sloan Avenue west of Interstate 295 interchange 65, the station serves trains of NJ Transit's Northeast Corridor Line between Trenton Transit Center and New York Penn Station. All Amtrak services bypass the station. Hamilton station has two high-level side platforms to serve trains on the outermost of four tracks.

Hamilton station opened on February 21, 1999 next to a former American Standard factory that had been turned into an office complex.

The Hamilton station received national media attention in 2019, when it was reported that commuters were regularly locked out of the station building in the early mornings. The building, which houses a ticket office, waiting room, and Dunkin' Donuts shop, is to open at 4:30 a.m. every day with the opening of the donut shop; a Dunkin' Donuts employee is contracted to open the doors of the building at that time. The ticket office opens later each day, at 6 a.m., and the platforms and a small enclosed waiting area are always kept open.

== Station layout ==
The station has two high-level side platforms connected by a passageway over the tracks. Amtrak's Northeast Corridor lines bypass the station via the inner tracks.
