= Ewing/Carroll, Trenton, New Jersey =

Populated place in Mercer County, New Jersey, US

Ewing/Carroll
- Neighborhood of Trenton
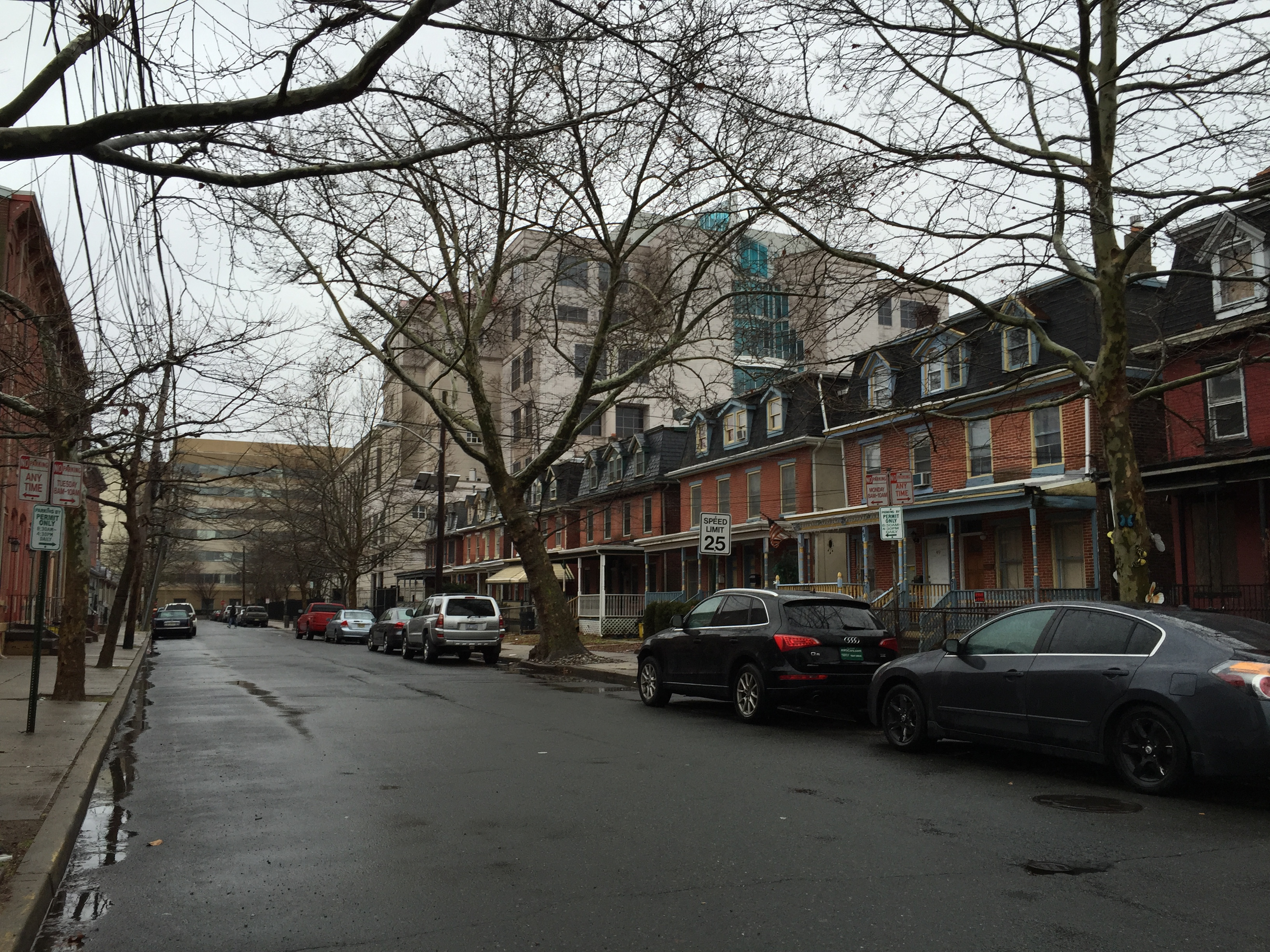
- Carroll Street in Trenton, New Jersey

- Location of Ewing/Carroll in Mercer County Inset: Location of county within the state of New Jersey Ewing/Carroll (New Jersey) Ewing/Carroll (the United States)
- Coordinates: 40°13′17″N 74°45′22″W
- Country: United States
- State: New Jersey
- County: Mercer
- City: Trenton

Ewing/Carroll is a neighborhood located within the city of Trenton in Mercer County, in the U.S. state of New Jersey. It is considered to be an enclave within the larger Coalport/North Clinton neighborhood.
