= Coalport/North Clinton, Trenton, New Jersey =

Populated place in Mercer County, New Jersey, US

Coalport/North Clinton
- Neighborhood of Trenton
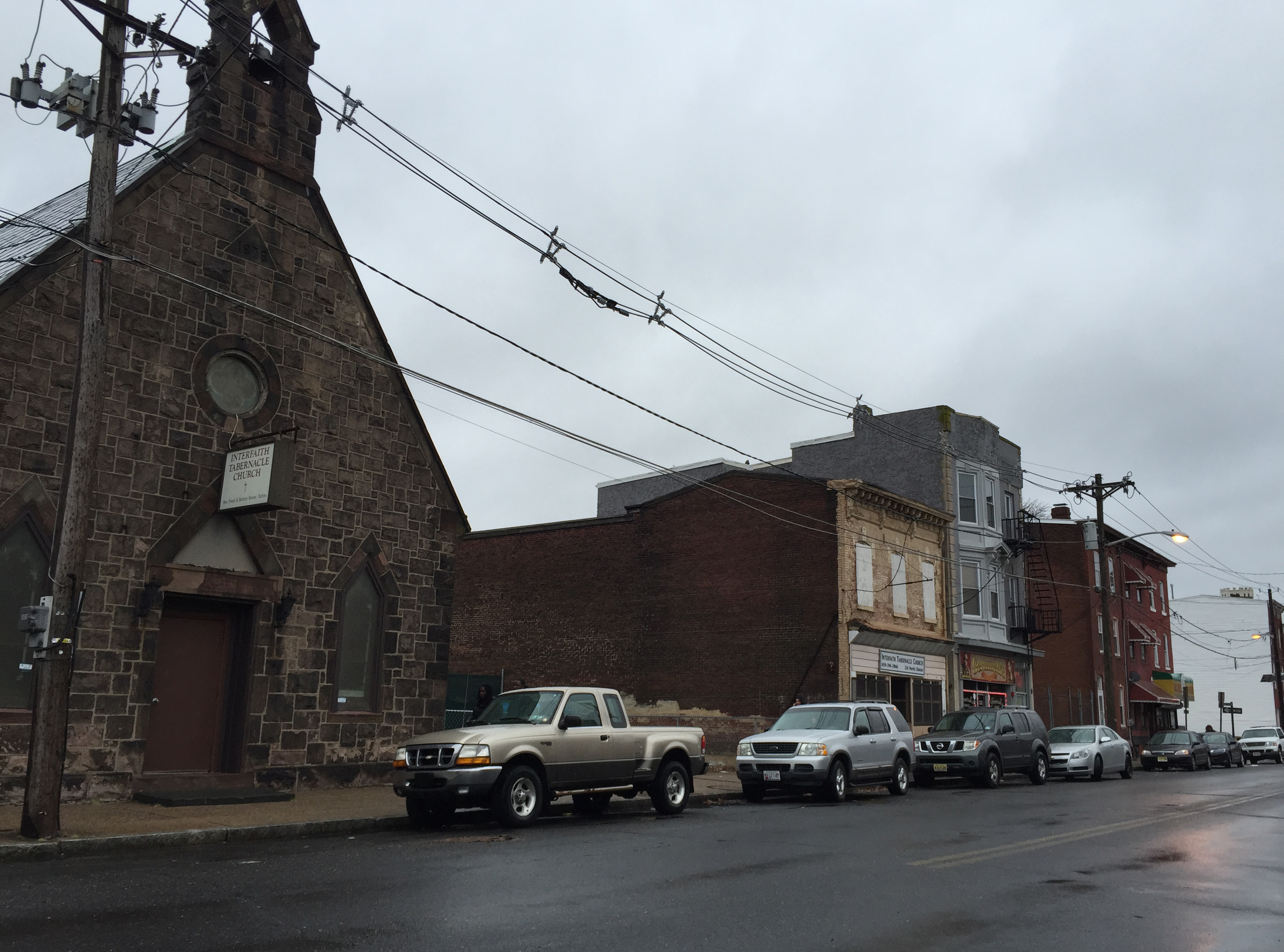
- Buildings along North Clinton Avenue in Coalport/North Clinton

- Location of Coalport/North Clinton in Mercer County Inset: Location of county within the state of New Jersey Coalport/North Clinton (New Jersey) Coalport/North Clinton (the United States)
- Coordinates: 40°13′37″N 74°45′19″W
- Country: United States
- State: New Jersey
- County: Mercer
- City: Trenton

Coalport/North Clinton is a neighborhood located within the city of Trenton in Mercer County, in the U.S. state of New Jersey. It contains the smaller enclave of Ewing/Carroll.
