= Clarksville, Mercer County, New Jersey =

Populated place in Hunterdon County, New Jersey, US

Clarksville, New Jersey
- Unincorporated community
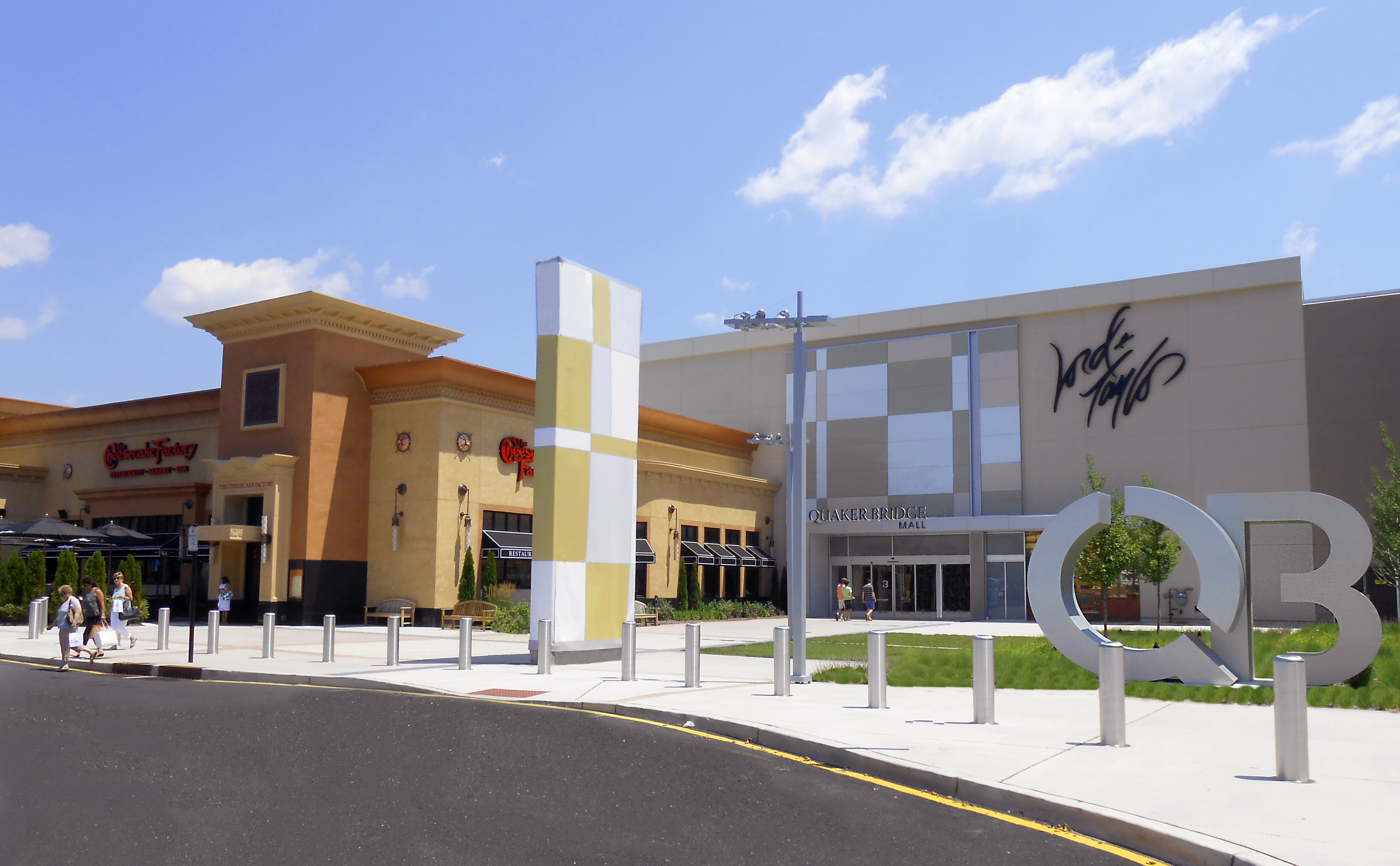
- Quaker Bridge Mall in Clarksville

- Location within Mercer County, New Jersey Location within New Jersey Location within the United States
- Coordinates: 40°17′47″N 74°40′49″W
- Country: United States
- State: New Jersey
- County: Mercer
- Township: Lawrence
- Elevation: 98 ft (30 m)
- GNIS feature ID: 875470

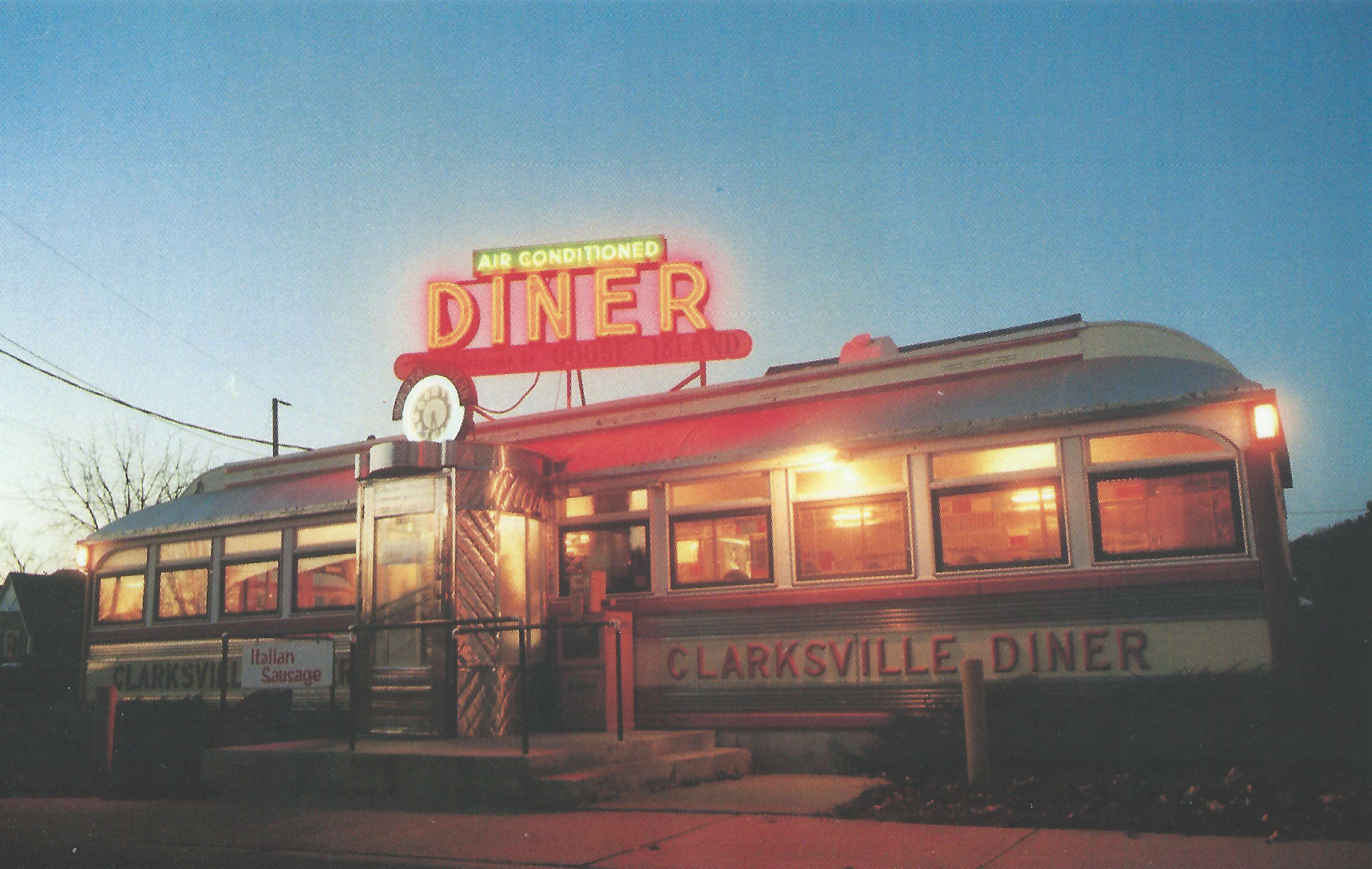
The Clarksville diner was a community staple in the hamlet of Clarksville from 1955-1988.

Clarksville is an unincorporated community partially in Lawrence Township, and partially in West Windsor Township, in Mercer County, in the U.S. state of New Jersey. It was historically centered at the intersection of the Trenton-New Brunswick Turnpike, Quakerbridge Road and Province Line Road, and had a blacksmith shop, saloon, store, hotel and school. Today, Clarksville is dominated by several large shopping centers, including the Quaker Bridge Mall.

In October 2019, the Historical Society of West Windsor published an online museum exploring the history of West Windsor, including the history of Clarksville.
