= East Trenton, New Jersey =

Populated place in Mercer County, New Jersey, US

- Neighborhood of Trenton
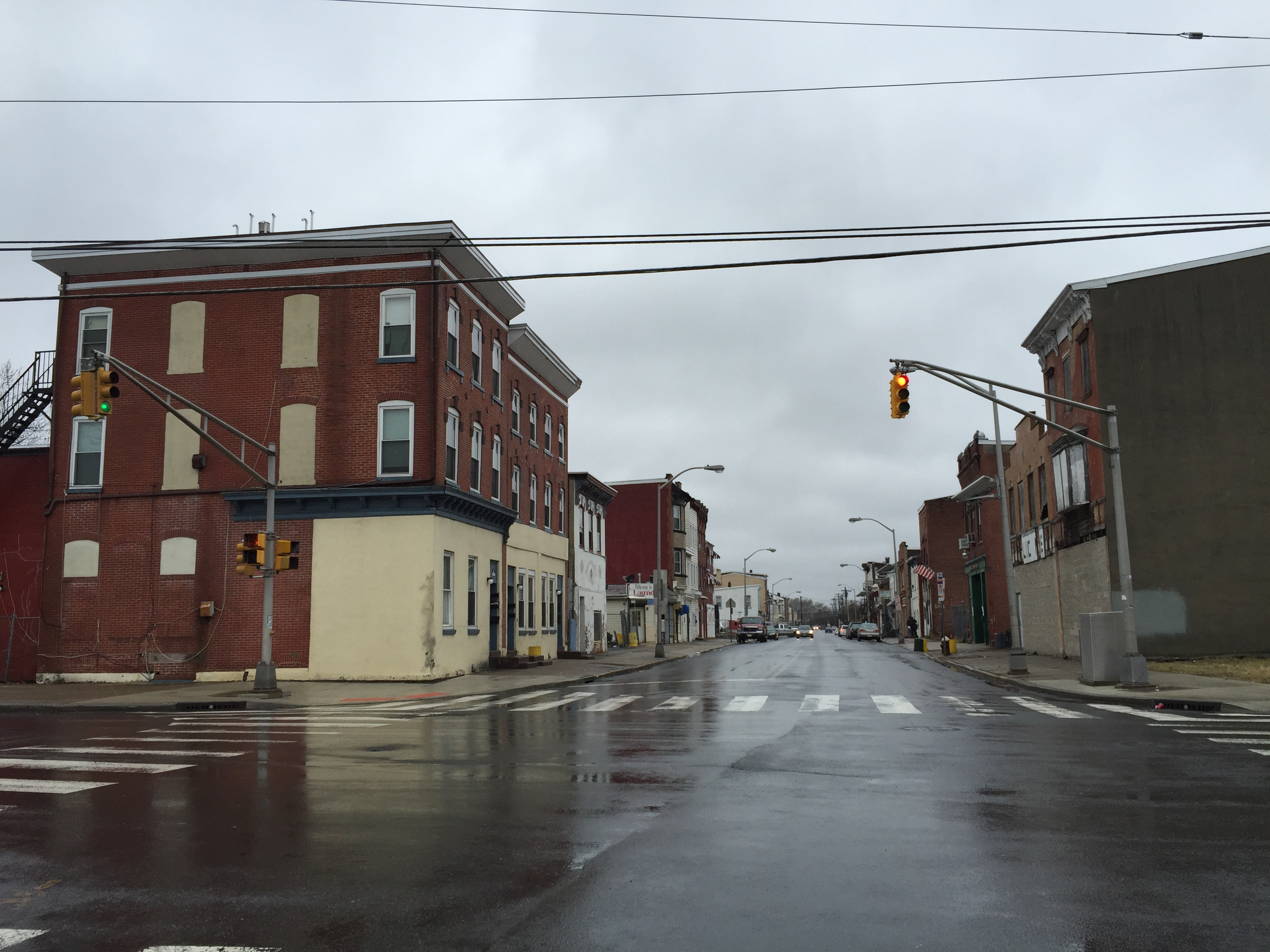
- View southwest along North Clinton Avenue at Olden Avenue in East Trenton

- Location within Mercer County, New Jersey Location within New Jersey Location within the United States
- Coordinates: 40°13′59″N 74°44′38″W
- Country: United States
- State: New Jersey
- County: Mercer
- City: Trenton

East Trenton is a neighborhood located within the city of Trenton in Mercer County, in the U.S. state of New Jersey. It borders Hamilton Township and is home to a sizable African-American community, besides having small pockets of Latinos (mainly from Puerto Rico) and Italians.

== Schools ==
Trenton Central High School, Trenton's primary public high school, is located in the neighborhood as well as the Trenton Train Station with Amtrak, NJ Transit, and SEPTA, service.

== Notable people ==
- Troy Vincent (born 1970), Buffalo Bills free safety.
