= Mercer County, New Jersey =

County in New Jersey, United States

- County
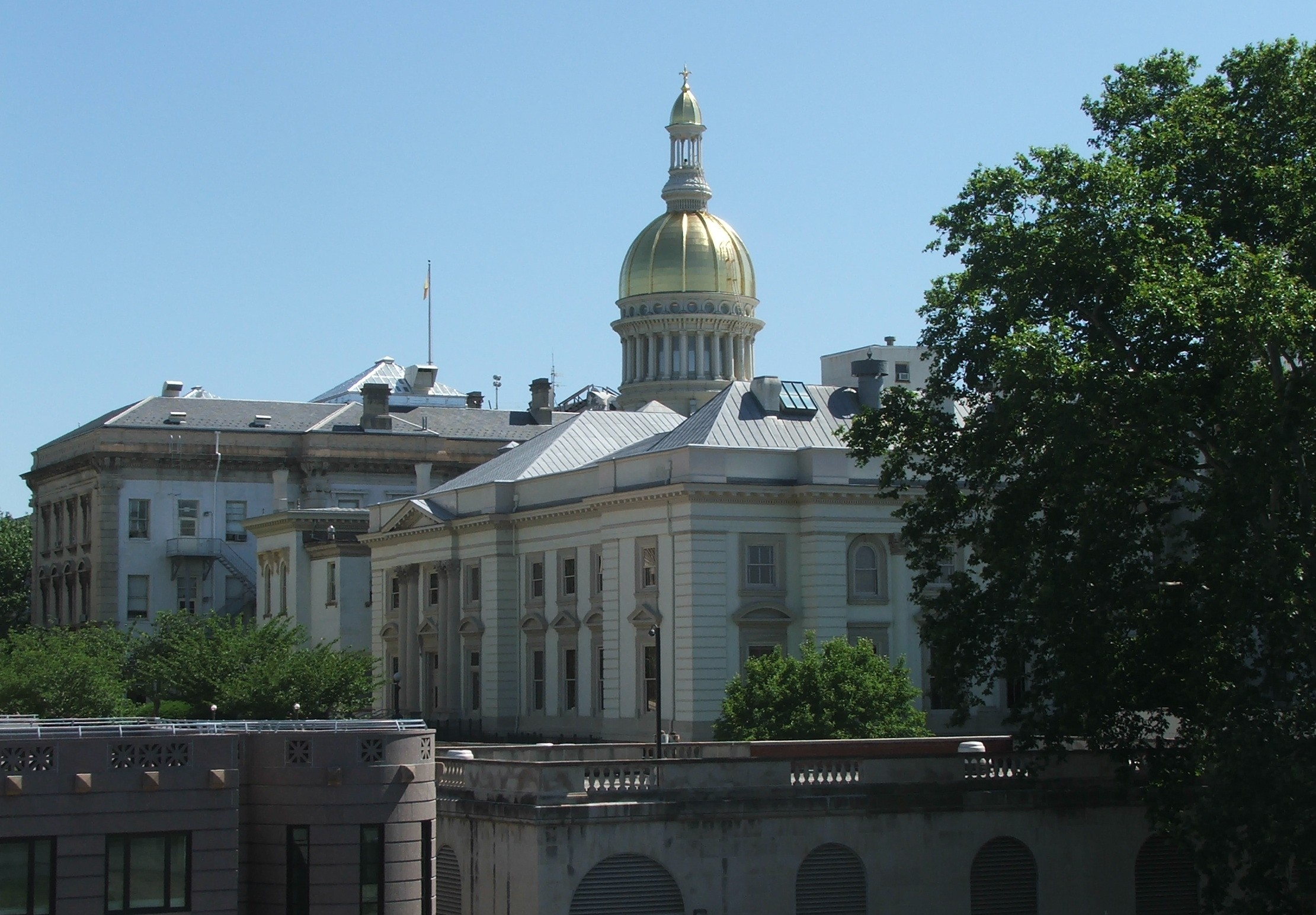
- The New Jersey State House and its golden dome in Trenton in 2006

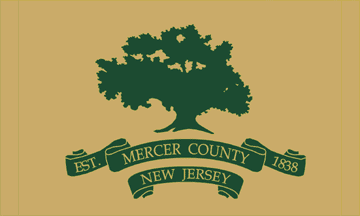
- Flag Seal
- Nickname: The Capital County
- Location within the U.S. state of New Jersey
- Interactive map of Mercer County, New Jersey
- Coordinates: 40.28°N 74.70°W
- Country: United States
- State: New Jersey
- Founded: 1838
- Named for: Hugh Mercer
- Seat: Trenton
- Largest municipality: Hamilton Township (population); Hopewell Township (area)

Government
  - County executive: Daniel R. Benson (D, term ends December 31, 2027)

Area
  - Total: 228.86 sq mi (592.7 km^{2})
  - Land: 224.44 sq mi (581.3 km^{2})
  - Water: 4.42 sq mi (11.4 km^{2}) 1.9%

Population (2020)
  - Total: 387,340
  - Estimate (2025): 399,289 ▲
  - Density: 1,725.8/sq mi (666.34/km^{2})
- Time zone: UTC−5 (Eastern)
  - Summer (DST): UTC−4 (EDT)
- Congressional districts: 3rd, 12th
- Website: mercercounty.org

Mercer County is a county located in the U.S. state of New Jersey. Its county seat is Trenton, also the state capital, prompting its nickname The Capital County. Mercer County alone constitutes the Trenton–Princeton metropolitan statistical area and is considered part of the New York combined statistical area by the U.S. Census Bureau, but also directly borders the Philadelphia metropolitan area and is included within the Federal Communications Commission's Philadelphia Designated Media Market Area. The county is part of the Central Jersey region of the state.

As of the 2020 United States census, the county retained its position as the state's 12th-most-populous county, with a population of 387,340, its highest decennial count ever and an increase of 20,827 (+5.7%) from the 366,513 recorded at the 2010 census, which in turn had reflected an increase of 15,752 (+4.5%) from the 350,761 enumerated at the 2000 census The United States Census Bureau's Population Estimates Program estimated a 2025 population of 399,289, an increase of 11,949 (+3.1%) from the 2020 decennial census. The most populous municipality in Mercer County at the 2020 census was Hamilton Township, with 92,297 residents, while Hopewell Township was the largest in area.

The county was formed by an act of the New Jersey Legislature on February 22, 1838, from portions of Burlington County (Nottingham Township, now Hamilton Township), Hunterdon County (Ewing Township, Lawrence Township, Trenton, and portions of Hopewell Township), and Middlesex County (West Windsor and portions of East Windsor). The former Keith Line bisects the county and is the boundary between municipalities that previously had been separated into West Jersey and East Jersey.

Trenton–Mercer Airport in Ewing Township is a commercial and corporate aviation airport serving Mercer County and its surrounding vicinity. Princeton is home to Princeton University, an Ivy League research university, and to Drumthwacket, the official residence of the governor of New Jersey. Mercer County contains 12 municipalities, the fewest of any county in New Jersey, and equal to Hudson County.

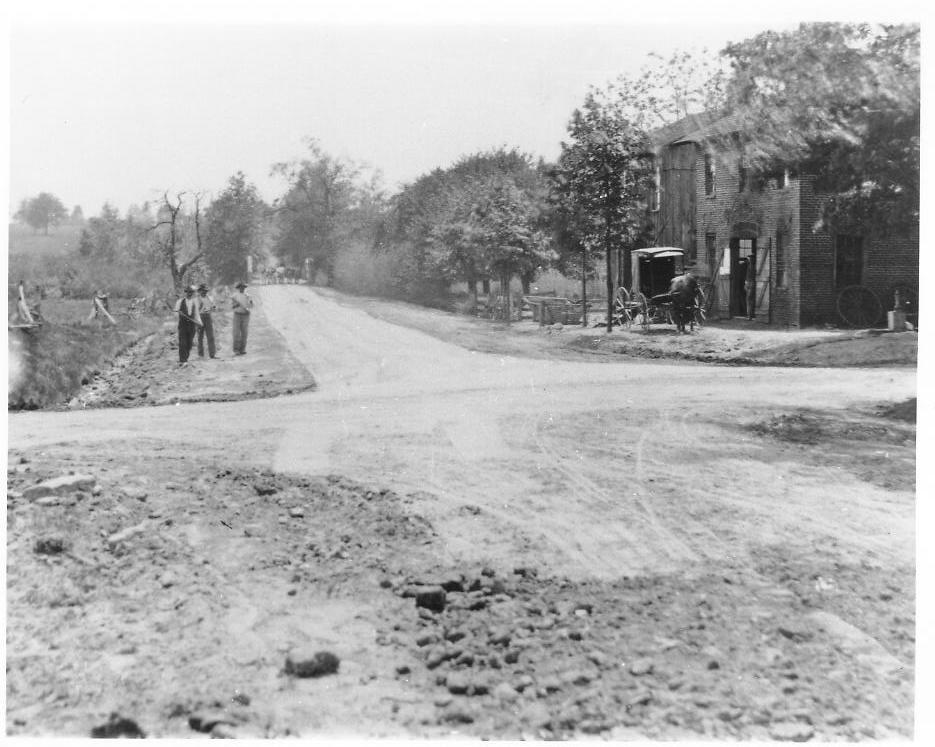
Trenton-New Brunswick Turnpike, the future U.S. Route 1 through Mercer County, 1904

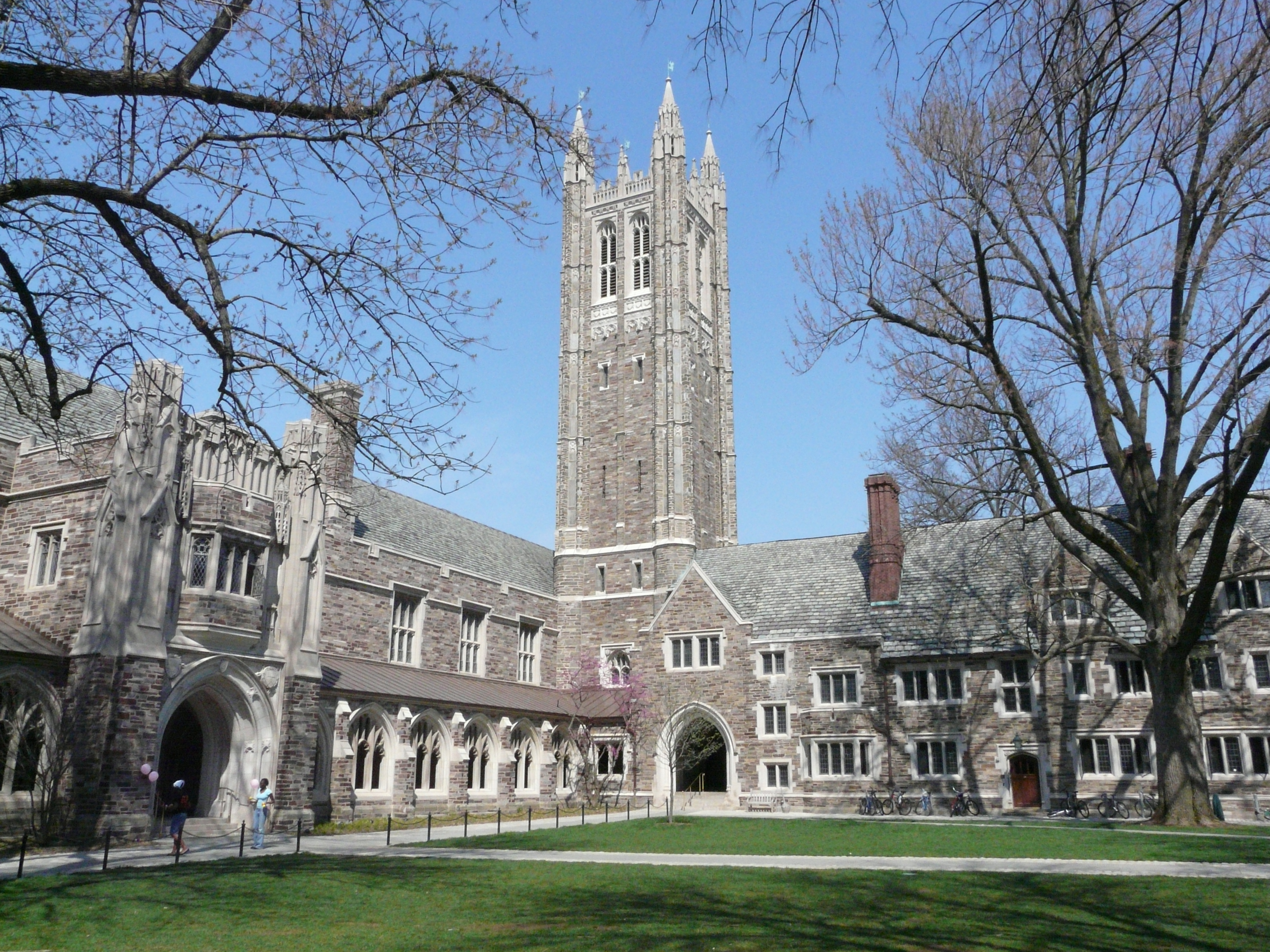
Holder Tower in Princeton University, one of the world's most prominent research universities

== Etymology ==
The county was named for Continental Army General Hugh Mercer, who died as a result of wounds received at the Battle of Princeton on January 3, 1777. Continental Army Brigadier General Hugh Mercer served in the Continental Army during the Battle of Trenton and the Battle of Princeton in 1777. A Scotsman who had fled to British North America after the failed Jacobite Rebellion, he worked closely with George Washington in the American Revolution. On January 3, 1777, Washington's army was en route to Princeton, New Jersey. While leading a vanguard of 350 soldiers, Mercer's brigade encountered two British regiments and a mounted unit. A fight broke out at an orchard grove and Mercer's horse was shot from under him. Getting to his feet, he was quickly surrounded by British troops who mistook him for George Washington and ordered him to surrender. Outnumbered, he drew his saber and began an unequal contest. He was finally beaten to the ground, bayoneted repeatedly (seven times), and left for dead. Legend has it that a beaten Mercer, with a bayonet still impaled in him, did not want to leave his men and the battle and was given a place to rest on a white oak tree's trunk, and those who remained with him stood their ground. The Mercer Oak, against which the dying general rested as his men continued to fight, appears on the county seal and stood for 250 years until it collapsed in 2000.

== History ==
Founded February 22, 1838, from portions of surrounding counties, Mercer County has a historical impact that reaches back to the pivotal battles of the American Revolutionary War. On the night of December 25–26, 1776, General George Washington led American forces across the Delaware River to attack the Hessian forces in the Battle of Trenton on the morning of December 26, also known as the First Battle of Trenton. After the battle, Washington crossed back to Pennsylvania. He crossed a third time in a surprise attack on the forces of General Charles Cornwallis at the Battle of the Assunpink Creek, on January 2, 1777, also known as the Second Battle of Trenton, and at the Battle of Princeton on January 3. The successful attacks built morale among the pro-independence colonists. Ewing Church Cemetery in Ewing is one of the oldest cemeteries in the area, having served the Ewing community for 300 years. It is home to the burial places of hundreds of veterans from The Revolutionary War to the Vietnam War.

Since 1790, Trenton has served as the state's capital, earning the county the name "the Capital County." After the Legislature relocated to Trenton from Perth Amboy in 1790, it purchased land for £250 and 5 shillings and constructed a new state house, designed by Philadelphia-based architect Jonathan Doane, beginning in 1792. The Doane building was covered in stucco, measured 150 by 50 feet (46 by 15 m), and housed the Senate and Assembly chambers in opposite wings. To meet the demands of the growing state, the structure was expanded several times during the 19th century. New Jersey, along with Nevada, is the only state to have its capital be located at the border with another state, as Trenton is across the Delaware River from Pennsylvania. The official residence of the governor of New Jersey, known as Drumthwacket, is located in Princeton, and is listed on both the U.S. National Register of Historic Places and the New Jersey Register of Historic Places.

The county experienced rapid urbanization and population growth during the first half of the 20th century due to the growth of industrialization in places such as Trenton. Mercer County was the landing spot for a fictional Martian invasion of the United States. In 1938, in what has become one of the most famous American radio plays of all time, Orson Welles acted out his The War of the Worlds invasion. His imaginary aliens first "landed" at what is now West Windsor. A commemorative monument is erected at Grovers Mill park.

There were 27 Mercer County residents killed during the September 11 terrorist attacks in Lower Manhattan. A 10-foot (3.0 m) long steel beam weighing one ton was given to the county by the Port Authority of New York and New Jersey in March 2011 and is now displayed at Mercer County Park.

== Geography and climate ==
According to the U.S. Census Bureau, as of the 2020 Census, the county had a total area of 228.86 square miles (592.7 km^{2}), of which 224.44 square miles (581.3 km^{2}) was land (98.1%) and 4.42 square miles (11.4 km^{2}) was water (1.9%).

The county is generally flat and low-lying on the inner coastal plain, which extends up to the Route 1 corridor. Further northwest, terrain rises as it ascends the Piedmont Plateau, with The Sourlands encompassing the far northwestern portion of the county. Baldpate Mountain, in the western part of Hopewell Township, is the highest point in the county, at 480 feet (150 m) above sea level. The lowest elevation is sea level, spread out along the shores of the tidal portions of the Delaware River, Crosswicks Creek and the smaller waterways within the Trenton-Hamilton Marsh in Hamilton Township and the city of Trenton.

=== Climate ===
Most of Mercer has a hot-summer humid continental climate (Dfa) except for the southern portion of the county near and including Trenton where a humid subtropical climate (Cfa) exists. The hardiness zones are 6b and 7a.

Climate data for Trenton, New Jersey (Trenton–Mercer Airport) 1991–2020 normals, extremes 1865–present
Month	Jan	Feb	Mar	Apr	May	Jun	Jul	Aug	Sep	Oct	Nov	Dec	Year
Record high °F (°C)	73 (23)	78 (26)	87 (31)	93 (34)	99 (37)	100 (38)	106 (41)	105 (41)	101 (38)	94 (34)	83 (28)	76 (24)	106 (41)
Mean maximum °F (°C)	62.7 (17.1)	62.7 (17.1)	74.2 (23.4)	83.0 (28.3)	88.6 (31.4)	93.4 (34.1)	96.3 (35.7)	94.3 (34.6)	89.7 (32.1)	81.4 (27.4)	72.0 (22.2)	64.2 (17.9)	97.2 (36.2)
Mean daily maximum °F (°C)	39.7 (4.3)	42.8 (6.0)	50.8 (10.4)	62.9 (17.2)	72.4 (22.4)	81.0 (27.2)	86.0 (30.0)	84.0 (28.9)	77.1 (25.1)	65.5 (18.6)	54.5 (12.5)	44.4 (6.9)	63.4 (17.4)
Daily mean °F (°C)	32.0 (0.0)	34.3 (1.3)	41.7 (5.4)	52.5 (11.4)	62.0 (16.7)	71.0 (21.7)	76.3 (24.6)	74.4 (23.6)	67.4 (19.7)	55.7 (13.2)	45.4 (7.4)	36.8 (2.7)	54.1 (12.3)
Mean daily minimum °F (°C)	24.3 (−4.3)	25.9 (−3.4)	32.7 (0.4)	42.1 (5.6)	51.6 (10.9)	60.9 (16.1)	66.6 (19.2)	64.8 (18.2)	57.7 (14.3)	45.9 (7.7)	36.3 (2.4)	29.3 (−1.5)	44.8 (7.1)
Mean minimum °F (°C)	7.2 (−13.8)	10.0 (−12.2)	17.9 (−7.8)	29.0 (−1.7)	37.7 (3.2)	48.3 (9.1)	57.0 (13.9)	54.4 (12.4)	43.2 (6.2)	31.6 (−0.2)	21.8 (−5.7)	14.8 (−9.6)	5.1 (−14.9)
Record low °F (°C)	−16 (−27)	−14 (−26)	0 (−18)	11 (−12)	31 (−1)	39 (4)	46 (8)	39 (4)	34 (1)	21 (−6)	9 (−13)	−8 (−22)	−16 (−27)
Average precipitation inches (mm)	3.29 (84)	2.63 (67)	3.97 (101)	3.63 (92)	3.99 (101)	4.25 (108)	4.39 (112)	4.22 (107)	4.09 (104)	3.79 (96)	3.18 (81)	4.04 (103)	45.47 (1,155)
Average snowfall inches (cm)	7.9 (20)	8.6 (22)	4.9 (12)	0.5 (1.3)	0.0 (0.0)	0.0 (0.0)	0.0 (0.0)	0.0 (0.0)	0.0 (0.0)	0.1 (0.25)	0.5 (1.3)	4.3 (11)	26.8 (67.85)
Average precipitation days (≥ 0.01 in)	10.1	10.1	11.0	11.5	12.0	11.9	10.8	10.0	8.6	10.0	8.5	11.0	125.5
Average snowy days (≥ 0.1 in)	4.6	4.3	2.6	0.3	0.0	0.0	0.0	0.0	0.0	0.0	0.3	2.3	14.4
Average relative humidity (%)	65.4	61.7	58.0	57.0	62.1	66.1	66.2	68.8	69.8	68.8	66.9	66.5	64.8
Average dew point °F (°C)	21.7 (−5.7)	22.8 (−5.1)	28.1 (−2.2)	37.7 (3.2)	48.7 (9.3)	59.4 (15.2)	63.9 (17.7)	63.5 (17.5)	57.0 (13.9)	45.6 (7.6)	35.9 (2.2)	26.5 (−3.1)	42.7 (5.9)
Mean monthly sunshine hours	163.1	169.7	207.4	227.2	248.1	262.8	269.2	252.5	215.0	201.5	149.3	140.1	2,505.9
Percentage possible sunshine	54	57	56	57	56	58	59	59	57	58	50	48	56
Source 1: NOAA (sun 1961–1981)
Source 2: PRISM Climate Group (humidity and dew point)

Climate data for Lawrence, Mercer County (40.2833, -74.7015), Elevation 62 ft (19 m), 1991–2020 normals, extremes 1981–2022
Month	Jan	Feb	Mar	Apr	May	Jun	Jul	Aug	Sep	Oct	Nov	Dec	Year
Record high °F (°C)	71.6 (22.0)	77.6 (25.3)	88.2 (31.2)	95.4 (35.2)	95.6 (35.3)	98.3 (36.8)	102.9 (39.4)	100.8 (38.2)	97.6 (36.4)	93.8 (34.3)	80.8 (27.1)	75.4 (24.1)	102.9 (39.4)
Mean daily maximum °F (°C)	40.4 (4.7)	43.0 (6.1)	50.8 (10.4)	63.2 (17.3)	72.7 (22.6)	81.9 (27.7)	86.5 (30.3)	84.8 (29.3)	78.2 (25.7)	66.3 (19.1)	55.5 (13.1)	45.4 (7.4)	64.2 (17.9)
Mean daily minimum °F (°C)	23.7 (−4.6)	25.2 (−3.8)	32.1 (0.1)	42.0 (5.6)	51.6 (10.9)	60.7 (15.9)	66.1 (18.9)	64.3 (17.9)	57.3 (14.1)	45.6 (7.6)	35.8 (2.1)	28.9 (−1.7)	44.5 (6.9)
Record low °F (°C)	−9.9 (−23.3)	−2.0 (−18.9)	4.9 (−15.1)	17.9 (−7.8)	32.6 (0.3)	41.8 (5.4)	48.0 (8.9)	42.2 (5.7)	36.4 (2.4)	24.7 (−4.1)	10.8 (−11.8)	0.0 (−17.8)	−9.9 (−23.3)
Average precipitation inches (mm)	3.56 (90)	2.76 (70)	4.26 (108)	3.68 (93)	4.04 (103)	4.48 (114)	4.94 (125)	4.44 (113)	4.18 (106)	4.12 (105)	3.32 (84)	4.37 (111)	48.15 (1,223)
Average dew point °F (°C)	21.8 (−5.7)	22.5 (−5.3)	28.0 (−2.2)	37.5 (3.1)	49.2 (9.6)	59.4 (15.2)	64.4 (18.0)	63.6 (17.6)	57.7 (14.3)	46.1 (7.8)	35.1 (1.7)	27.5 (−2.5)	42.8 (6.0)
Source: PRISM

=== Ecology ===
According to the A. W. Kuchler U.S. potential natural vegetation types, most of Mercer County would have a dominant vegetation type of Appalachian Oak (104) with a dominant vegetation form of Eastern Hardwood Forest (25) with a dominant section of Northeastern Oak/Pine (110) Southern Mixed Forest (26) in the far east near Hightstown.

== Demographics ==
Historical population
Census	Pop.	Note	%±
1840	21,502		—
1850	27,992		30.2%
1860	37,419		33.7%
1870	46,386		24.0%
1880	58,061		25.2%
1890	79,978		37.7%
1900	95,365		19.2%
1910	125,657		31.8%
1920	159,881		27.2%
1930	187,143		17.1%
1940	197,318		5.4%
1950	229,781		16.5%
1960	266,392		15.9%
1970	304,116		14.2%
1980	307,863		1.2%
1990	325,824		5.8%
2000	350,761		7.7%
2010	366,513		4.5%
2020	387,340		5.7%
2025 (est.)	399,289		3.1%
Historical sources: 1790–1990; 1970-2010 2010-2019 2020

=== 2020 census ===
As of the 2020 United States census, Mercer County had a population of 387,340, making it the 12th-most populous county in New Jersey. Females comprised 50.8% of the population, matching the statewide share. Of the population, 5.4% were under the age of 5. Another 21.3% were under 18 and 15.4% were 65 or older, and the median age was 38.5 years.

For every 100 females there were 96.3 males, and for every 100 females age 18 and over there were 94.1 males.

The racial makeup of the county was 46.1% White, 19.4% Black or African American, 0.6% American Indian and Alaska Native, 12.5% Asian, 0.1% Native Hawaiian and Pacific Islander, 12.8% from some other race, and 8.6% from two or more races. Hispanic or Latino residents of any race comprised 21.7% of the population.

94.9% of residents lived in urban areas, while 5.1% lived in rural areas.

There were 139,361 households in the county, of which 32.9% had children under the age of 18 living in them. Of all households, 46.7% were married-couple households, 17.6% were households with a male householder and no spouse or partner present, and 29.7% were households with a female householder and no spouse or partner present. About 26.6% of all households were made up of individuals and 11.4% had someone living alone who was 65 years of age or older.

There were 150,442 housing units, of which 7.4% were vacant. Among occupied housing units, 59.5% were owner-occupied and 40.5% were renter-occupied. The homeowner vacancy rate was 1.4% and the rental vacancy rate was 7.7%.

=== Racial and ethnic composition ===
Mercer County, New Jersey – Racial and ethnic composition Note: the US Census treats Hispanic/Latino as an ethnic category. This table excludes Latinos from the racial categories and assigns them to a separate category. Hispanics/Latinos may be of any race.
Race / Ethnicity (NH = Non-Hispanic)	Pop 1980	Pop 1990	Pop 2000	Pop 2010	Pop 2020	% 1980	% 1990	% 2000	% 2010	% 2020
White alone (NH)	237,340	236,143	225,284	199,909	168,580	77.09%	72.48%	64.23%	54.54%	43.52%
Black or African American alone (NH)	54,876	59,449	67,922	71,378	72,364	17.82%	18.25%	19.36%	19.47%	18.68%
Native American or Alaska Native alone (NH)	271	467	425	535	427	0.09%	0.14%	0.12%	0.15%	0.11%
Asian alone (NH)	3,795	9,736	17,250	32,545	48,330	1.23%	2.99%	4.92%	8.88%	12.48%
Native Hawaiian or Pacific Islander alone (NH)	x	x	170	146	106	x	x	0.05%	0.04%	0.03%
Other race alone (NH)	1,001	364	634	630	1,879	0.33%	0.11%	0.18%	0.17%	0.49%
Mixed race or Multiracial (NH)	x	x	5,178	6,052	11,477	x	x	1.48%	1.65%	2.96%
Hispanic or Latino (any race)	10,580	19,665	33,898	55,318	84,177	3.44%	6.04%	9.66%	15.09%	21.73%
Total	307,863	325,824	350,761	366,513	387,340	100.00%	100.00%	100.00%	100.00%	100.00%

=== 2010 census ===
The 2010 United States census counted 366,513 people, 133,155 households, and 89,480 families in the county. The population density was 1,632.2 per square mile (630.2/km^{2}). There were 143,169 housing units at an average density of 637.6 per square mile (246.2/km^{2}). The racial makeup was 61.39% (225,011) White, 20.28% (74,318) Black or African American, 0.33% (1,194) Native American, 8.94% (32,752) Asian, 0.08% (295) Pacific Islander, 6.24% (22,856) from other races, and 2.75% (10,087) from two or more races. Hispanic or Latino of any race were 15.09% (55,318) of the population.

Of the 133,155 households, 31.4% had children under the age of 18; 48.2% were married couples living together; 14.2% had a female householder with no husband present and 32.8% were non-families. Of all households, 26.9% were made up of individuals and 10.1% had someone living alone who was 65 years of age or older. The average household size was 2.61 and the average family size was 3.16.

22.6% of the population were under the age of 18, 10.9% from 18 to 24, 26.9% from 25 to 44, 26.9% from 45 to 64, and 12.6% who were 65 years of age or older. The median age was 37.8 years. For every 100 females, the population had 95.5 males. For every 100 females ages 18 and older there were 93 males.

== Economy ==
Based on data from the Bureau of Economic Analysis, the county had a gross domestic product of $36.0 billion in 2021, ranked seventh in the state and a 6.7% increase from the prior year.

In 2015, the county had a per capita personal income of $63,720, the sixth-highest in New Jersey, and ranked 121st of 3,113 counties in the United States. Mercer County stands among the highest-income counties in the United States, with the Bureau of Economic Analysis having ranked the county as having the 78th-highest per capita income of all 3,113 counties in the United States (and the sixth-highest in New Jersey) as of 2009. Trenton's role as New Jersey's state capital contributes significantly to Mercer County's economic standing. 9.5% of the population is considered at or below the poverty line.

The median household income in Mercer County is $83,306. 89.6% of the population has a high school diploma, and 43.5% of the county's population has a bachelor's degree or higher, one of the highest rates in the state, as of the 2020 census.

== Government ==
=== County government ===
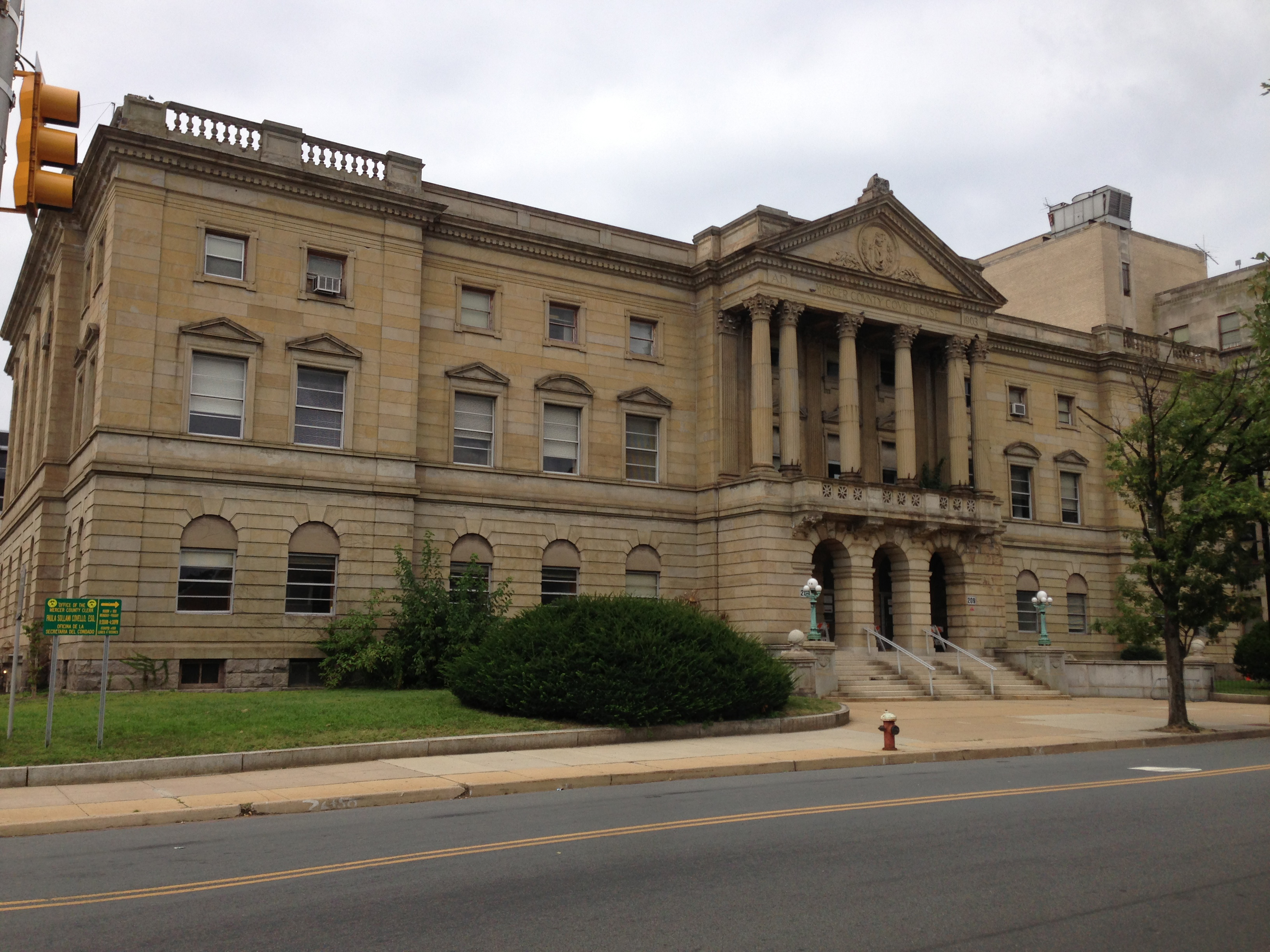
Mercer County Courthouse in Trenton

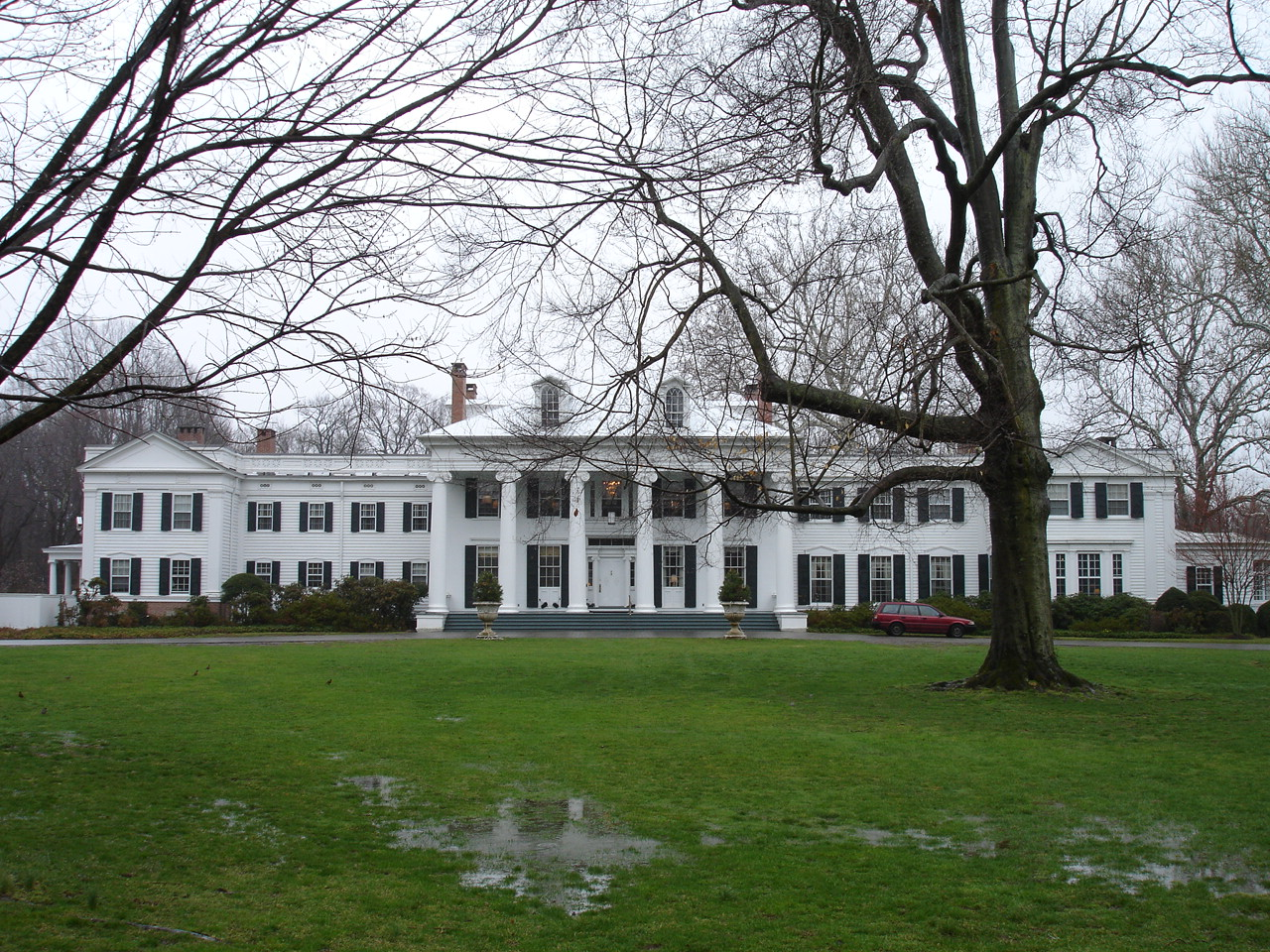
Drumthwacket, the official residence of the Governor of New Jersey, is located in Princeton and is listed on both the U.S. National Register of Historic Places and the New Jersey Register of Historic Places.

Mercer County has a county executive form of government, in which the Mercer County Executive performs executive functions, administering the operation of the county, and a Board of County Commissioners acts in a legislative capacity. The county executive is directly elected to a four-year term of office. The seven-member Board of County Commissioners, previously known as the Board of Chosen Freeholders, is elected at-large to serve three-year staggered terms of office on a staggered basis, with either two or three seats up for election each year. The Board is led by a Commissioner Chair and vice-chair, selected from among its members at an annual reorganization meeting held in January. The Commissioner Board establishes policy and provides a check on the powers of the County Executive. The Board approves all county contracts and gives advice and consent to the County Executive's appointments of department heads, and appointments to boards and commissions. The Commissioner Board votes to approve the budget prepared by the Executive after review and modifications are made. In 2016, freeholders were paid $29,763 and the freeholder director was paid an annual salary of $31,763. That year, the county executive was paid $164,090 per year.

As of 2025, the Mercer County Executive is Daniel R. Benson (D, Hamilton Township) whose term of office ends December 31, 2027. Mercer County's Commissioners are (with terms for chair and vice chair ending every December 31):

Commissioner	Party, Residence, Term
Chair John A. Cimino	D, Hamilton Township, 2026
Vice Chair Kristin L. McLaughlin	D, Hopewell Township, 2027
Samuel T. Frisby Sr.	D, Trenton, 2027
Cathleen M. Lewis	D, Lawrence Township, 2025
Nina D. Melker	D, Hamilton Township, 2025
Terrance Stokes	D, Ewing Township, 2027
Lucylle R. S. Walter	D, Ewing Township, 2026

Pursuant to Article VII Section II of the New Jersey State Constitution, each county in New Jersey is required to have three elected administrative officials known as "constitutional officers." These officers are the County Clerk and County Surrogate (both elected for five-year terms of office) and the County Sheriff (elected for a three-year term). Mercer County's constitutional officers are:

Title	Representative
County Clerk	Paula Sollami-Covello (D, Lawrence Township, 2025),
Sheriff	John A. Kemler (D, Hamilton Township, 2026)
Surrogate	Diane Gerofsky (D, Lawrence Township, 2026).

No Republican has won countywide office since 2000. Law enforcement on the county level is provided by the Mercer County Sheriff's Office and the Mercer County Prosecutor's Office. The Mercer County Prosecutor is Angelo J. Onofri of Hamilton Township, who took office in December 2016 after being nominated by Governor of New Jersey Chris Christie and being confirmed by the New Jersey Senate. Mercer County constitutes Vicinage 7 of the Superior Court of New Jersey. The vicinage is seated at the Mercer County Criminal Courthouse, located at 400 South Warren Street in Trenton. The vicinage has additional facilities for the Civil, Special Civil, General Equity, and Family Parts at the Mercer County Civil Courthouse, located at 175 South Broad Street, also in Trenton. The Assignment Judge for Mercer County is Mary C. Jacobson.

=== Federal representatives ===
Portions of the 3rd and 12th Congressional Districts cover the county. For the 119th United States Congress, New Jersey's 3rd congressional district is currently represented Herb Conaway (D, Delran Township). For the 119th United States Congress, New Jersey's 12th congressional district is represented by Bonnie Watson Coleman (D, Ewing Township).

=== State representatives ===
The 12 municipalities of Mercer County are covered by three legislative districts.

District	Senator	Assembly	Municipalities
14th	Linda R. Greenstein (D)	Wayne DeAngelo (D) Tennille McCoy (D)	East Windsor, Hamilton Township, Hightstown Borough and Robbinsville Township The remainder of the district includes portions of Middlesex County.
15th	Shirley Turner (D)	Verlina Reynolds-Jackson (D) Anthony Verrelli (D)	Ewing Township, Hopewell Borough, Hopewell Township, Lawrence Township, Pennington Borough, Trenton and West Windsor The remainder of the district includes portions of Hunterdon County.
16th	Andrew Zwicker (D)	Mitchelle Drulis (D) Roy Freiman (D)	Princeton The remainder of the district covers portions of Hunterdon County, Middlesex County, and Somerset County.

== Politics ==
United States presidential election results for Mercer County, New Jersey
Year	Republican		Democratic		Third party(ies)	
Year	No.	%	No.	%	No.	%
1896	13,847	66.84%	5,970	28.82%	901	4.35%
1900	13,878	61.66%	7,861	34.93%	769	3.42%
1904	14,900	60.60%	8,528	34.69%	1,158	4.71%
1908	14,941	58.99%	9,288	36.67%	1,100	4.34%
1912	5,676	26.88%	7,773	36.80%	7,671	36.32%
1916	14,213	55.75%	10,621	41.66%	659	2.59%
1920	29,626	63.46%	15,713	33.66%	1,344	2.88%
1924	30,689	59.53%	14,639	28.40%	6,223	12.07%
1928	41,056	59.21%	27,908	40.25%	374	0.54%
1932	33,715	50.41%	30,284	45.28%	2,880	4.31%
1936	29,283	37.75%	47,702	61.50%	579	0.75%
1940	37,190	42.49%	50,121	57.26%	222	0.25%
1944	36,844	41.23%	52,383	58.61%	144	0.16%
1948	37,794	42.26%	49,690	55.56%	1,952	2.18%
1952	50,423	46.40%	57,751	53.15%	488	0.45%
1956	56,029	51.35%	52,684	48.29%	392	0.36%
1960	46,924	38.69%	74,166	61.16%	179	0.15%
1964	35,081	28.70%	86,985	71.17%	148	0.12%
1968	45,354	36.13%	63,218	50.36%	16,957	13.51%
1972	69,303	52.03%	62,180	46.68%	1,708	1.28%
1976	58,453	44.67%	69,621	53.20%	2,782	2.13%
1980	53,450	41.57%	60,888	47.35%	14,244	11.08%
1984	71,195	51.55%	66,398	48.07%	528	0.38%
1988	65,384	48.31%	68,712	50.77%	1,249	0.92%
1992	50,473	34.75%	71,383	49.14%	23,404	16.11%
1996	40,559	30.79%	77,641	58.94%	13,526	10.27%
2000	46,670	34.43%	83,256	61.42%	5,633	4.16%
2004	56,604	37.86%	91,580	61.25%	1,326	0.89%
2008	50,223	31.32%	107,926	67.29%	2,229	1.39%
2012	47,355	30.48%	104,377	67.19%	3,623	2.33%
2016	46,193	29.23%	104,775	66.29%	7,090	4.49%
2020	51,641	29.24%	122,532	69.38%	2,431	1.38%
2024	52,274	32.02%	107,558	65.88%	3,438	2.11%

Mercer County is a reliably Democratic county; it has gone for Republicans only three times (in 1956, 1972, 1984) since 1936. In each presidential election of the 21st century, the Democratic candidate earned at least 60% of the vote. Since the 2008 election, every municipality has voted for the Democratic candidate, and in the 2024 election, it was the 2nd most Democratic county in the state. This comes after Joe Biden won the county by 40.0% in 2020, the widest margin for anyone since 1964. As of October 1, 2021, there were a total of 265,703 registered voters in Mercer County, of whom 121,653 (45.8%) were registered as Democrats, 41,701 (15.7%) were registered as Republicans and 98,343 (37.0%) were registered as unaffiliated. There were 4,006 voters (1.5%) registered to other parties.

Senate Class 1 election results

United States Senate election results for Mercer County, New Jersey1
Year	Republican		Democratic		Third party(ies)	
Year	No.	%	No.	%	No.	%
2024	46,932	29.98%	105,685	67.52%	3,907	2.50%
2018	41,225	32.52%	80,773	63.71%	4,785	3.77%
2012	43,793	30.28%	97,964	67.73%	2,890	2.00%
2006	34,958	37.39%	56,111	60.01%	2,435	2.60%
2000	53,542	41.50%	72,250	56.00%	3,236	2.51%
1994	37,266	43.40%	46,175	53.77%	2,432	2.83%
1988	49,122	37.67%	80,569	61.78%	724	0.56%
1982	43,431	44.68%	52,593	54.11%	1,171	1.20%

Senate Class 2 election results

United States Senate election results for Mercer County, New Jersey2
Year	Republican		Democratic		Third party(ies)	
Year	No.	%	No.	%	No.	%
2020	52,248	30.27%	117,821	68.26%	2,527	1.46%
2014	25,749	32.29%	52,476	65.80%	1,524	1.91%
2013	18,576	31.38%	38,934	65.78%	1,682	2.84%
2008	52,298	35.73%	91,088	62.22%	3,004	2.05%
2002	37,195	39.91%	53,675	57.59%	2,338	2.51%
1996	48,829	39.76%	67,867	55.26%	6,110	4.98%
1990	39,570	45.94%	45,036	52.28%	1,535	1.78%
1984	35,745	27.17%	94,782	72.04%	1,036	0.79%

=== State elections ===
Governor election results

Gubernatorial election results for Mercer County, New Jersey
Year	Republican		Democratic		Third party(ies)	
Year	No.	%	No.	%	No.	%
2025	36,156	28.11%	91,713	71.31%	741	0.58%
2021	34,617	34.06%	66,151	65.09%	857	0.84%
2017	30,645	33.14%	59,992	64.87%	1,846	2.00%
2013	48,530	51.94%	43,282	46.32%	1,621	1.73%
2009	39,769	39.27%	55,199	54.51%	6,298	6.22%
2005	38,871	39.24%	56,592	57.13%	3,596	3.63%
2001	31,705	33.60%	57,513	60.95%	5,148	5.46%
1997	44,056	40.82%	54,977	50.93%	8,905	8.25%
1993	57,599	51.96%	50,840	45.87%	2,407	2.17%
1989	29,887	30.13%	67,962	68.50%	1,359	1.37%
1985	53,562	63.19%	30,212	35.64%	994	1.17%
1981	43,156	43.84%	53,897	54.76%	1,378	1.40%
1977	32,994	32.94%	65,371	65.26%	1,810	1.81%
1973	20,859	22.26%	71,527	76.34%	1,314	1.40%
1969	52,041	51.29%	47,421	46.74%	1,995	1.97%
1965	33,206	34.35%	62,835	65.00%	634	0.66%
1961	37,444	37.64%	61,550	61.88%	473	0.48%
1957	28,682	33.36%	56,881	66.16%	413	0.48%
1953	28,351	35.51%	50,624	63.41%	856	1.07%

== Transportation ==
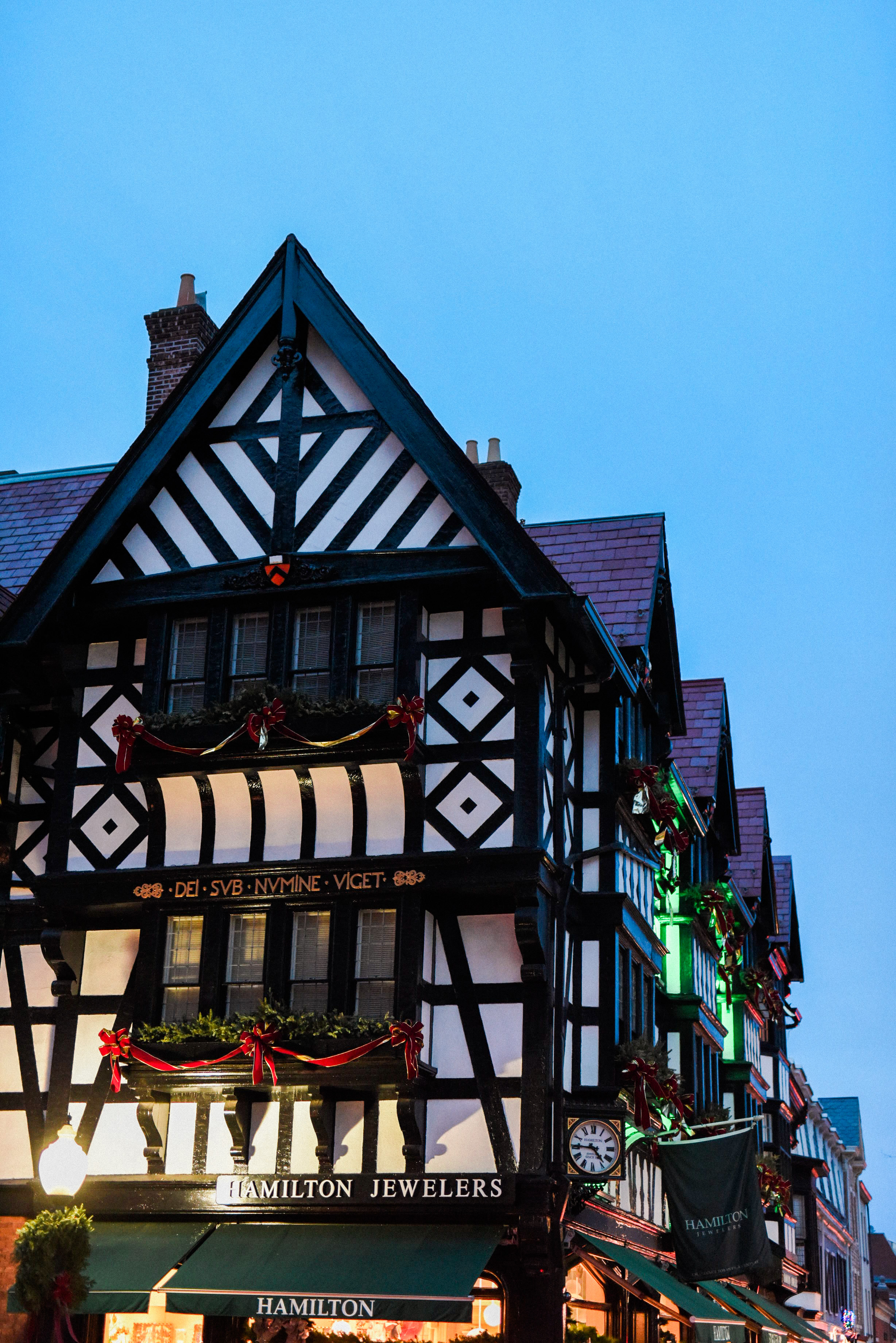
Nassau Street in Princeton

=== Roads and highways ===
Mercer County has county routes, state routes, U.S. Routes and Interstates that all pass through. As of 2010, the county had a total of 1,524.30 miles (2,453.12 km) of roadways, of which 1,216.48 miles (1,957.73 km) were maintained by the local municipality, 175.80 miles (282.92 km) by Mercer County, 118.99 miles (191.50 km) by the New Jersey Department of Transportation, 1.19 miles (1.92 km) by the Delaware River Joint Toll Bridge Commission and 12.43 miles (20.00 km) by the New Jersey Turnpike Authority.

Mercer County is served by the following major roadways:

- U.S. Route 1 (Which bisects the county)
- U.S. Route 1 Business
- Route 27 (Only in Princeton)
- Route 29
- Route 31
- Route 33
- Route 64 (A small state-maintained bridge located in West Windsor)
- Interstate 95 (New Jersey Turnpike)
- Route 129
- U.S. Route 130
- Route 133 (Only in East Windsor)
- Route 175
- Interstate 195
- U.S. Route 206
- Interstate 295

I-295 functions as a partial ring-road around the Trenton area, while I-195 serves as an east–west expressway from Trenton to the Jersey Shore. The New Jersey Turnpike (I-95) passes through the southeastern section of the county, and serves as a major corridor to Delaware, Washington, D.C. to the south, and New York City and New England towards the north. Two turnpike interchanges are located within Mercer County: Exit 7A in Robbinsville Township and Exit 8 in East Windsor.

Before 2018, Interstate 95 abruptly ended at the interchange with US 1 in Lawrence Township, and became I-295 south. Signs directed motorists to the continuation of I-95 by using I-295 to I-195 east to the New Jersey Turnpike. This was all due in part to the cancellation of the Somerset Freeway that was supposed to go from Hopewell Township in Mercer County up to Franklin Township in Somerset County.

The section of I-95 west of the US 1 interchange in Lawrence was re-numbered as part of I-295 in March 2018, six months before a direct interchange with Interstate 95 in Pennsylvania and the Pennsylvania Turnpike opened. This planned interchange indirectly prompted another project: the New Jersey Turnpike Authority extended the 'dual-dual' configuration (inner car lanes and outer truck / bus / car lanes) to Interchange 6 in Mansfield Township, Burlington County from its former end at Interchange 8A in Monroe Township, Middlesex County. This widening was completed in early November 2014.

The county roads that traverse through are County Route 518 (only in the Hopewells), County Route 524, County Route 526, County Route 533, County Route 535, County Route 539, County Route 546, County Route 569, County Route 571, and County Route 583.

=== Public transportation ===
Mercer hosts several NJ Transit stations, including Trenton, Hamilton and Princeton Junction on the Northeast Corridor Line, as well as Princeton on the Princeton Branch. SEPTA provides rail service to Center City Philadelphia from Trenton and West Trenton. Long-distance transportation is provided by Amtrak train service along the Northeast Corridor through the Trenton Transit Center.

NJ Transit's River Line connects Trenton to Camden, with three stations in the county, all within Trenton city limits, at Cass Street, Hamilton Avenue and at the Trenton Transit Center.

Mercer County's only commercial airport, and one of three in the state, is Trenton–Mercer Airport in Ewing Township, which is served by Frontier Airlines, offering nonstop service to and from points nationwide.

== Municipalities ==
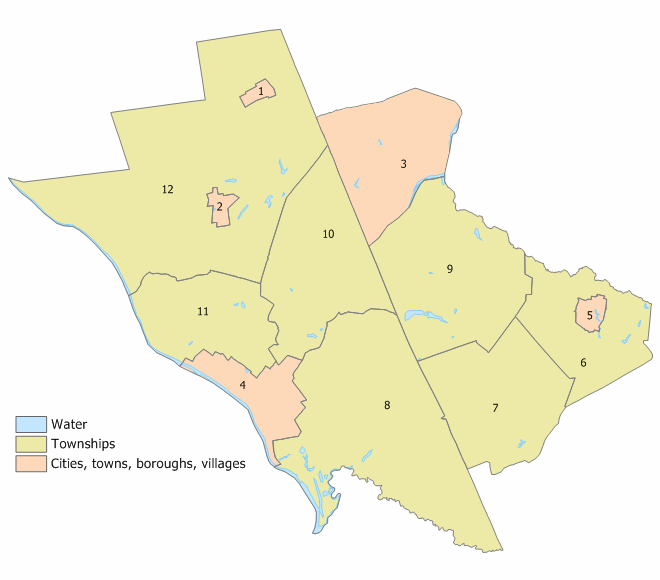
Index map of Mercer County municipalities (click to see index)

The 12 municipalities in Mercer County (with 2010 Census data for population, housing units and area) are:

Municipality (with map key)	Map key	Municipal type	Population	Housing Units	Total Area (sq. mi.)	Water Area (sq. mi.)	Land Area (sq. mi.)	Pop. Density (pop./sq. mi.)	Housing Density (houses/sq. mi.)	School district	Communities
East Windsor	6	township	30,045	10,851	15.74	0.10	15.65	1,737.6	693.4	East Windsor	Allens Station, Eiler Corner, Etra, Hickory Corner, Locust Corner, Millstone, Twin Rivers CDP (7,787)
Ewing Township	11	township	37,264	13,926	15.60	0.35	15.25	2,346.9	913.2	Ewing	Altura, Braeburn Heights, Briarcrest, Briarwood, The College of New Jersey CDP (3,701) Churchill Green, Ewing, Ewing Park, Ewingville, Fernwood, Ferry Road Manor, Fleetwood Village, Glendale, Green Curve Heights, Hampton Hills, Heath Manor, Hickory Hill Estates, Hillwood Lakes, Hillwood Manor, Mountainview, Parkway Village, Prospect Heights, Prospect Park, Scudders Falls, Shabakunk Hills, Sherbrooke Manor, Somerset, Spring Meadows, Village on the Green, Weber Park, West Trenton, Wilburtha, Wynnewood Manor
Hamilton Township	8	township	92,297	36,170	40.39	0.90	39.49	2,240.2	915.9	Hamilton Township	Briar Manor, Broad Street Park, Chewalla Park, Creston, Deutzville, Duck Island, East Trenton Heights, Edgebrook, Extonville, Golden Crest, Groveville CDP (3,106), Haines Corner, Hamilton Square CDP (12,679), Hutchinson Mills, Lakeside Park, Maple Shade, Mercerville CDP (9,791), North Crosswicks, Nottingham, Pond Run, Quaker Bridge, Quaker Gardens, Rosemont, The Orchards, Trenton Gardens, Warner Village, White Horse CDP (9,494), Yardville CDP (7,186), Yardville Heights CDP (6,965)
Hightstown	5	borough	5,900	2,108	1.24	0.03	1.21	4,536.0	1,740.4	East Windsor	
Hopewell Borough	1	borough	1,918	817	0.70	0.00	0.70	2,735.2	1,162.7	Hopewell Valley	
Hopewell Township	12	township	17,491	6,551	58.91	0.88	58.03	298.2	112.9	Hopewell Valley	Akers Corner, Baldwins Corner, Bear Tavern, Centerville, Coopers Corner, Glenmoore, Harbourton, Harts Corner, Marshalls Corner, Moore, Mount Rose, Pleasant Valley, Stoutsburg, Titusville CDP (633), Washington Crossing CDP (371), Woodsville
Lawrence Township	10	township	33,077	13,239	22.06	0.25	21.81	1,534.8	607.1	Lawrence Township	Bakersville, Clarksville, Colonial Lakelands, Coxs Corner, Eldridge Park, Franklin Corner, Harneys Corner, Lawrence Station, Lawrenceville CDP (3,751), Lewisville, Port Mercer, Princessville, Quaker Bridge, Rosedale, Slackwood, Sturwood Hamlet
Pennington	2	borough	2,802	1,083	0.96	0.00	0.96	2,703.9	1,132.8	Hopewell Valley	
Princeton (Note: Princeton Township and Princeton Borough merged on January 1, 2013. The data is tabulated from the sum of the two municipalities' 2010 populations and areas. Though it has a borough form of government, the municipality type is classified by the state government as "other.")	3	borough	30,681	10,302	18.36	0.43	17.93	1,593.53	574.6	Princeton	Cedar Grove, Port Mercer, Princeton North
Robbinsville Township	7	township	15,476	5,277	20.49	0.18	20.32	671.5	259.7	Robbinsville	Known as Washington Township until November 2007; Allens Station, Carsons Mills, Hillside Terrace, Meadows Terrace, New Canton, New Sharon, Pages Corners, Robbinsville Center CDP (3,164), Windsor CDP (330)
Trenton	4	city	90,871	33,035	8.16	0.51	7.65	11,101.9	4,319.2	Trenton	Battle Monument, Berkeley Square, Cadwalader Heights, Central West, Chambersburg, Chestnut Park, Coalport/North Clinton, Downtown Trenton, Duck Island, East Trenton, Ewing/Carroll, Fisher/Richey/Perdicaris, Franklin Park, Glen Afton, Greenwood/Hamilton, Hanover/Academy, Hillcrest, Hiltonia, Lamberton, North 25, North Trenton, Parkside, Pennington/Prospect, South Trenton, Stuyvesant/Prospect, The Island, Top Road, Villa Park, West End, Wilbur
West Windsor	9	township	29,518	9,810	26.27	0.71	25.56	1,062.6	383.7	West Windsor-Plainsboro	Berrien City, Clarksville, Dutch Neck, Edinburg, Edinburg Park, Golf View Manor, Grover's Mill, Old Mill Farms, Penns Neck, Port Mercer, Post Corner, Princeton Colonial Park, Princeton Estates, Princeton Ivy East, Princeton Junction CDP (2,475), Sherbrook Estates
Mercer County		county	387,340	143,169	228.89	4.33	224.56	1,632.2	637.6		

=== Historical Municipalities ===
- Nottingham Township (1688–1856)
- Princeton Township (1838–2013)
- Borough of Princeton (1813–2013)
- Washington Township (renamed Robbinsville Township in 2008)

Interactive map of municipalities in Mercer County.

== Sports ==
Mercer County has a number of large parks. The largest, Mercer County Park is the home for the US Olympic Rowing Team's training center.

Mercer County is also the home of the Trenton Thunder baseball team, playing in the MLB Draft League, and the Jersey Flight of the National Arena League. The Thunder were formerly the Double-A affiliate of the New York Yankees playing in the Eastern League before the 2021 Minor League reorganization. The minor league hockey team, the Trenton Titans, established in 1999 and operating as the ECHL affiliate of the NHL's Philadelphia Flyers and the AHL's Adirondack Phantoms, disbanded before the start of the 2013–14 season.

=== Collegiate athletics ===
Mercer County is also home to several college athletic programs, including two NCAA DI schools. Rider University competes as the Rider Broncs in the MAAC. In wrestling, Rider is a member of the Eastern Wrestling League. The Princeton Tigers compete in the Ivy League.

The College of New Jersey Lions compete in the NCAA DIII as a member of the New Jersey Athletic Conference and the Eastern College Athletic Conference.

Mercer County Community College competes as the Mercer Vikings as a member of the Garden State Athletic Conference and the National Junior College Athletic Association.

== Education ==
School districts in the county include:

K-12

- East Windsor Regional School District
- Ewing Public Schools
- Hamilton Township School District
- Hopewell Valley Regional School District
- Lawrence Township Public Schools
- Mercer County Special Services School District
- Princeton Public Schools
- Robbinsville Public School District
- Trenton Public Schools
- West Windsor-Plainsboro Regional School District

9-12

- Mercer County Technical Schools

Special

There is a state-operated school, Marie H. Katzenbach School for the Deaf.

=== Higher education ===
Mercer County is home to Princeton University, Princeton Theological Seminary, the Institute for Advanced Study, Rider University, Westminster Choir College, The College of New Jersey, and Thomas Edison State University. Mercer County Community College is a county-run community college located in West Windsor.

== Points of interest ==
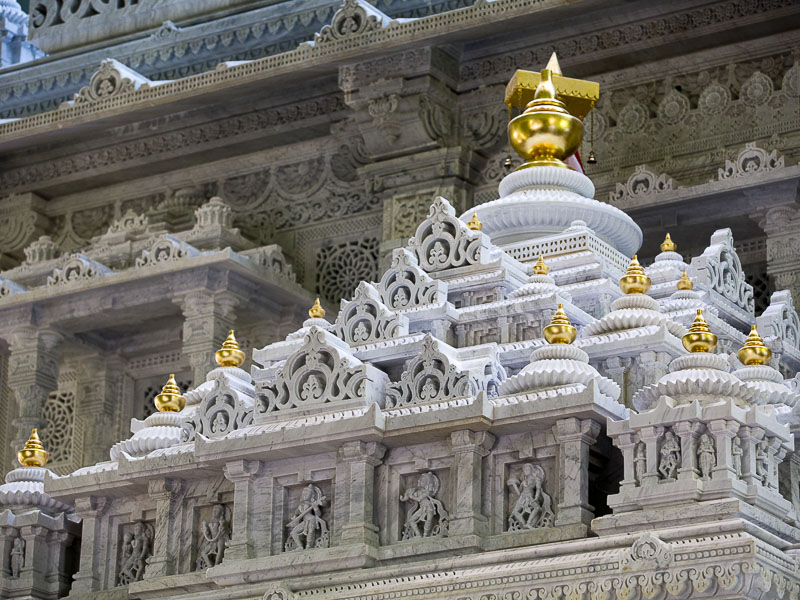
Swaminarayan Akshardham in Robbinsville is the third-largest Hindu temple in the world and the largest in the Western Hemisphere.

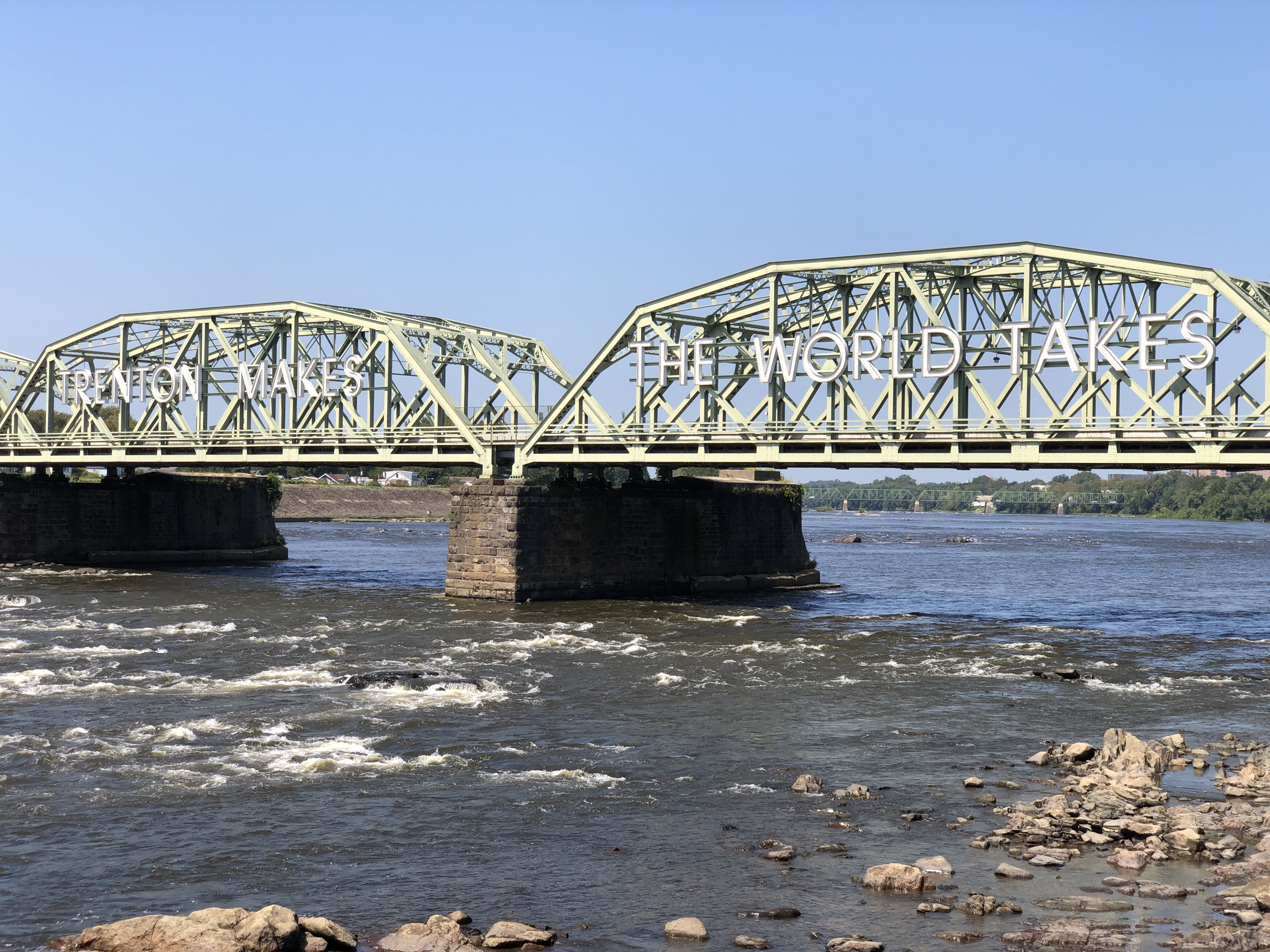
The eastern half of the Lower Trenton Bridge lies within Mercer County and harks to Trenton's longstanding role as a diverse manufacturing hub.

- Drumthwacket, The official residence of the Governor of New Jersey located in Princeton
- New Jersey State House, The capitol complex of New Jersey and the meeting point of the state legislature, located at the state capital in Trenton
- Mercer County Park, in West Windsor
- Hamilton Veterans Park
- Mercer County Park September 11 Memorial
- Swaminarayan Akshardham in Robbinsville, the largest Hindu temple outside Asia
- Assunpink Creek (part)
- Mercer Lake at Mercer County Park
- Griggstown Native Grassland Preserve (part)
- Princeton Battlefield
- Mercer Oaks Golf Course
- Washington Crossing State Park, in Hopewell Township
- Colonial Memorial Park in Trenton
- Lower Trenton Bridge
- Trenton War Memorial
- Trenton Thunder Ballpark
- Grounds for Sculpture, in Hamilton Township

=== Wineries ===
- Hopewell Valley Vineyards
- Working Dog Winery, in East Windsor Township

== See also ==
- National Register of Historic Places listings in Mercer County, New Jersey
