= Princeton station =

Princeton station may refer to:

- Princeton station (CTA), a former el station in Chicago, Illinois
- Princeton station (Illinois), a railroad station in Princeton, Illinois
- Princeton station (Minnesota), a former railroad station in Princeton, Minnesota
- Princeton station (NJ Transit), a commuter rail station in Princeton, New Jersey
- Princeton Junction station, a railroad station in Princeton Junction, New Jersey

== See also ==
- Princeton (disambiguation)
