= Princeville =

Princeville may refer to:

- Princeville, Hawaii, US
- Princeville, Illinois, US
- Princeville, North Carolina, US
- Princeville, Québec, Canada

== See also ==
- Prince (disambiguation)
- Ville (disambiguation)
- Fort Prince
- Prince County
- Princeton (disambiguation)
- Princetown (disambiguation)
