= TigerTransit =

Bus system of Princeton University

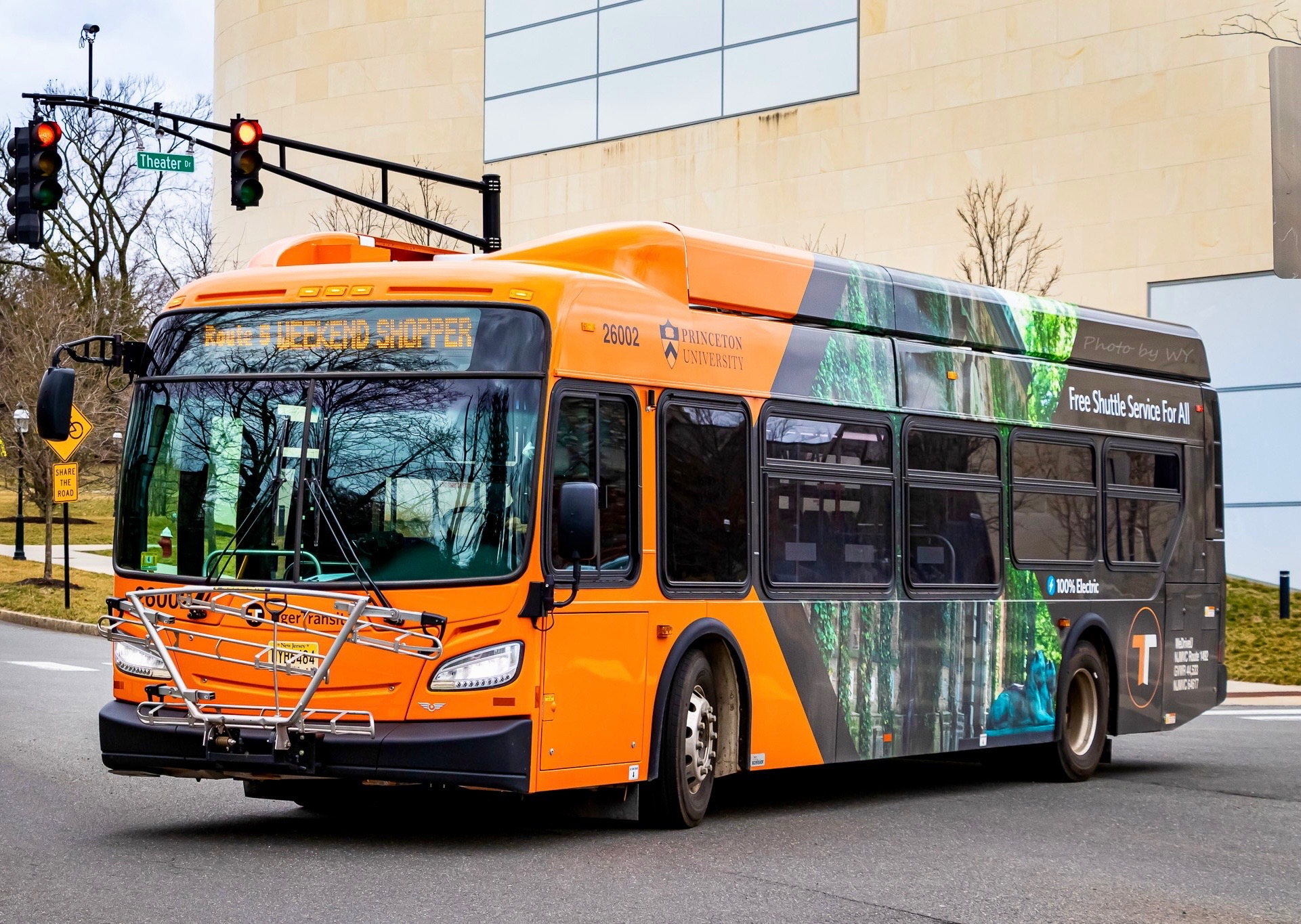
- TigerTransit 26002 on Weekend Shopper
- Parent: Princeton University
- Locale: Princeton University campuses and surrounding neighborhoods
- Service area: Mercer County, New Jersey
- Service type: University bus system
- Routes: 9
- Destinations: Princeton Junction; Princeton, New Jersey
- Fleet: 23 (17 buses & 6 cutaways)
- Fuel type: Gasoline, electric
- Operator: WeDriveU (2021-present); First Transit (2009-2021)
- Website: Official website

TigerTransit is the Princeton University shuttle bus service in and around its campus in Princeton, New Jersey, and other nearby areas of Mercer County. TigerTransit operates nine routes within the campus and around the city of Princeton. WeDriveU operates the service.

== Routes ==
All TigerTransit routes are free of charge and open to the public. Main routes (1-4) only operate on during the daytime on weekdays, with two routes (N5/6) providing daily late night service and three routes (W5/6, WS) providing weekend-only service. The Princeton Junction branch of Route 4 essentially functions as an alternative to the Princeton Branch. The Weekend Shopper (WS) route combines service around much of the Princeton campus with service along US-1 to shopping centers in Princeton, West Windsor, and Lawrenceville.

=== Route list ===
The route list is current as of the Spring 2025 semester. Routes prefixed with W are weekend routes; routes prefixed with N are late-night routes.

Number	Name	Serves	Timeframe
1	Grad College to Stadium Drive Garage	Princeton Graduate College to Stadium Drive Garage via Faculty Rd and Washington Rd	Operated weekdays from 7am–10pm; limited early morning service from Stadium Drive Garage from 6am.
2	Lawrence/Lakeside to EQuad	Friend Center to Lawrence Apartments via Faculty Rd and Washington Rd	Operated weekdays from 7am–10pm.
3	Merrick to Forrestal/PPPL	Merrick Stanworth Apartments to Forrestal Campus and Princeton Plasma Physics Laboratory via Nassau St, Washington Rd, and US-1	Operated weekdays from 7am–7pm.
4	Princeton Junction to Meadows via Princeton Station and EQuad	Meadows Drive Garage to Princeton Junction via Stockton St, Alexander St, and Princeton Station	Operated weekdays from 7am–10pm. Service to Princeton Junction operated 7am–7pm only.
N5	Grad College to Meadows via Friend Center	Graduate College to Friend Center to Meadows Drive Garage to Princeton Station	Operated daily from 10pm–3am.
N6	Lawrence/Lakeside to EQuad	Lawrence Apartments to Friend Center via Princeton Station and Yeh College	Operated daily from 10pm–3am.
W5	Grad College to Meadows via Friend Center	Graduate College to Friend Center to Meadows Drive Garage to Princeton Station	Operated weekends 9am–10pm.
W6	Lawrence/Lakeside to EQuad	Lawrence Apartments to Friend Center via Princeton Station	Operated weekends 9am–10pm.
WS	Weekend Shopper	Graduate College to Square at West Windsor, Mercer on One, and Nassau Park Pavilion via Princeton Station and Lawrence Apartments	Operated weekends 9am–5pm.

== Fleet ==
The Princeton University TigerTransit fleet is operated by WeDriveU, which has operated the service since February 2021 when the former operator First Transit lost their contract. The initial fleet under WeDriveU consisted of 14 New Flyer D40LF transit buses from Orange County Transportation Authority and various Ford cutaways. All former OCTA New Flyer D40LFs have since been replaced by fully electric buses (NFI XE35 CHARGE NG), and the Ford cutaways are expected to be replaced as well in 2025.

=== Active ===
Fleet numbers	Photo	Year	Manufacturer	Model	Powertrain	Notes
22004, 22006, 22008, 22013, 22015-22016		2019	Ford	E-450	Ford Modular 6.8L V10 Gasoline; Ford TorqShift 5R110W	Ex-Boeing Renton Employee shuttle; Entered service in 2021
26002-26018		2022	NFI	XE35 CHARGE NG	Siemens HV 1DB2016; Siemens ELFA3	First unit 26002 entered service on 11/22/2022.

=== On order ===
Fleet numbers	Photo	Year	Manufacturer	Model	Powertrain
22019-22026		2025	Ford	E-450	Lightning eMotor
