= Rick Joy =

American architect (born 1958)

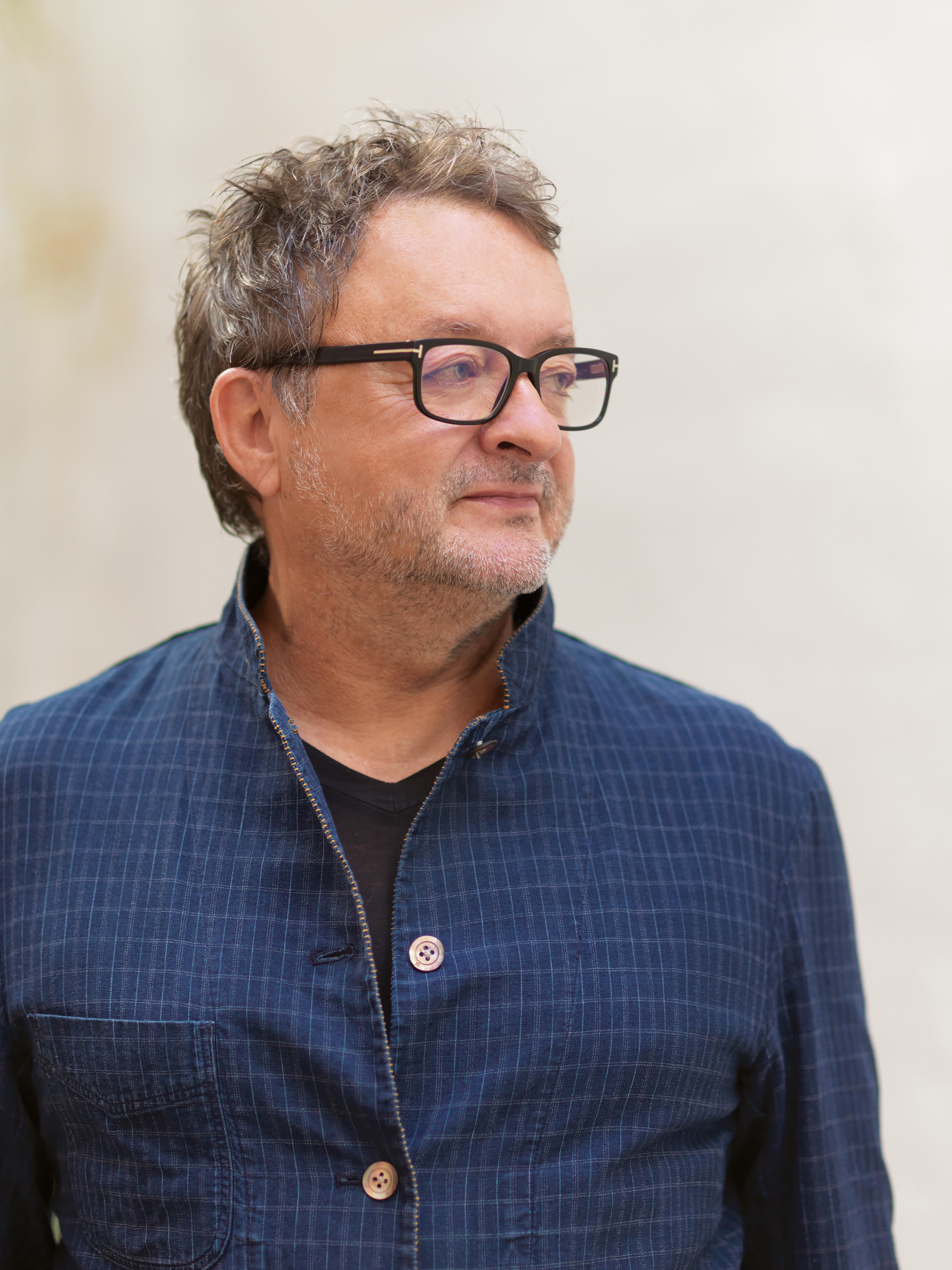
- Born: 1958 (age 67–68); Dover-Foxcroft, Maine, U.S.
- Education: University of Arizona; University of Maine
- Occupation: Architect
- Practice: Studio Rick Joy
- Buildings: Princeton Transit Hall, Amangiri Resort, Polanco
- Projects: Rick Joy: Desert Works, Studio Rick Joy Works

Rick Joy (born 1958) is an American architect. Rick Joy is Principal of Studio Rick Joy, an architecture and planning firm established in 1993 in Tucson, Arizona.

== Early life ==
Joy was born in Dover-Foxcroft, Maine. He studied music at the University of Maine before studying architecture at the University of Arizona, graduating in 1990. His architectural career began with a three-year appointment on the design team of the Phoenix Public Library with Will Bruder Architects.

== Career and recognition ==
In 1993, Joy established Rick Joy Architects in Tucson, Arizona. The firm, owned and operated by Joy, changed its name to Studio Rick Joy in 2019 and had a staff of thirty as of that year. The work of Studio Rick Joy ranges from high-concept contemporary design to traditional architectural and master planning services. Many of the firm's works have been exhibited, published, and awarded. Joy received the 2002 American Academy of Arts and Letters Award in Architecture and in 2004 won the prestigious National Design Award from the Smithsonian Institution/Cooper-Hewitt Museum. In 2019, he was inducted into the Interior Design Hall of Fame. The firm has gained substantial international recognition, has participated in multiple exhibitions, and has been featured in over 150 publications worldwide. Joy has lectured extensively throughout the United States and around the globe and is considered an important contributor to the ongoing global discourse on modern architecture. He periodically serves as a visiting professor of architecture at the Harvard Graduate School of Design, Rice University, University of Arizona, and M.I.T. In 2002, Joy's first monograph was published under the title Desert Works, as the first in the Princeton Architectural Press/Graham Foundation invited New Voices in Architecture series.

The firm's extensive experience with lifestyle based projects encompasses a wide range of project types and locations. Early residential projects in the desert southwest frequently employed rammed earth, steel and concrete in the design. Expanding into different climates and cultural places has led to new formal responses and a diverse, locally grounded material palette. The firm has realized architectural residences in regions such as mountains in Idaho, forests in Vermont, and an urban loft in the heart of Manhattan.

In the late 2010s, the firm expanded its work to new types of sites, like the islands of Turks and Caicos and Ibiza, grew its firm structure by founding lighting design consultancy, led by Claudia Kappl Joy, and completed its first civic project, a transit hall and market on the Princeton University Campus. It also began to work at a large scale, with projects such as a luxury resort for Aman Resorts in southern Utah with I-10 Studio, the St. Edward's University Campus Chapel and Holy Cross Institute Complex, the 9 story housing block for the 2011 Pan American Games in Guadalajara, Mexico, the master planning of new towns in Mexico and Utah, new master planning in York, Maine and Le Massif, Canada, a 1.3 million square foot mixed-use development in Tucson, Arizona.

== Major works ==
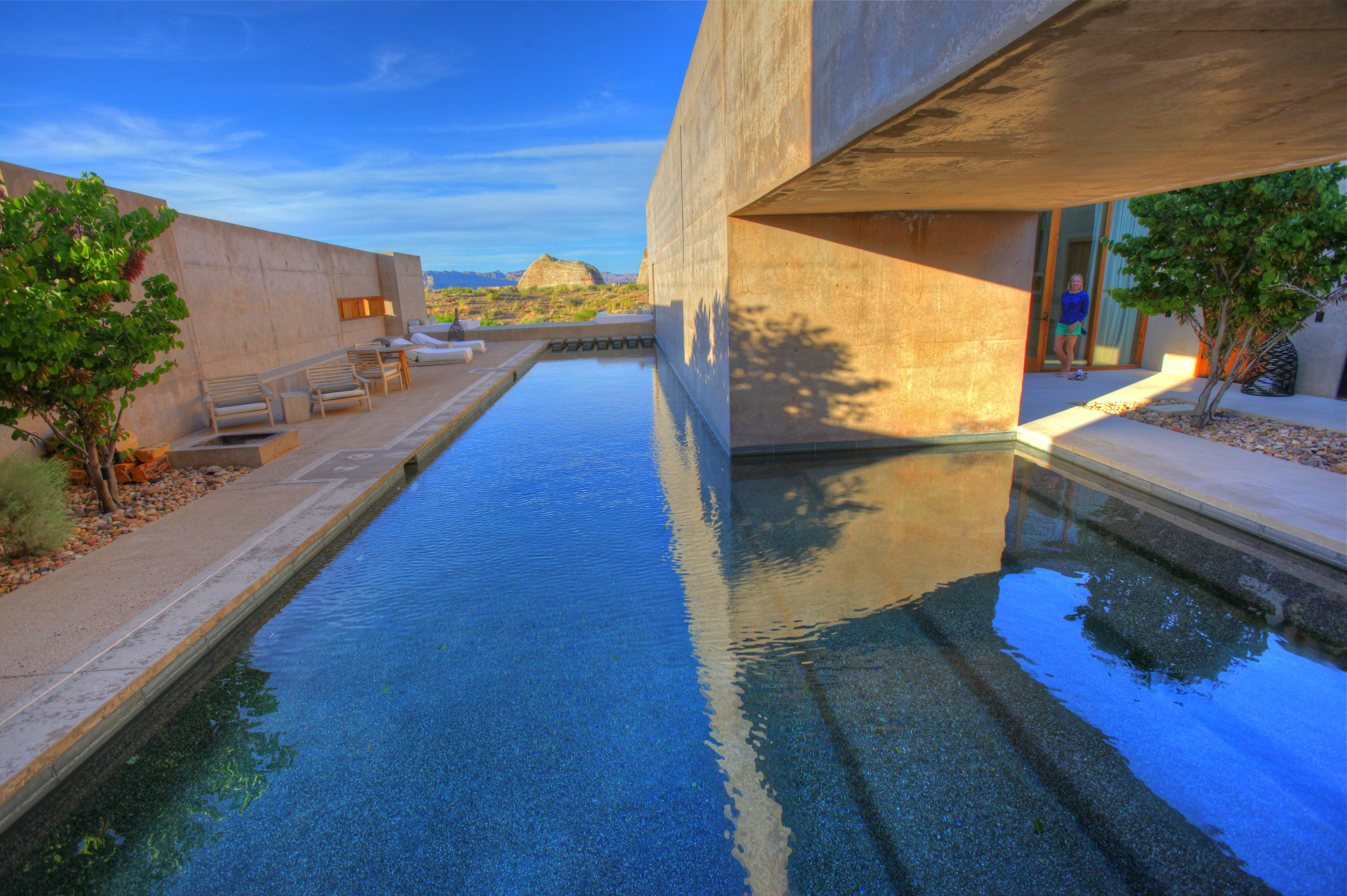
Amangiri Resort, Utah

- 2019 Polanco, Mexico City, Mexico
- 2019 Sabina Estates, Ibiza
- 2018 Le Cabanon, Turks and Caicos
- 2017 Princeton Transit Hall, United States
- 2012 NY Loft, Manhattan, New York City, United States
- 2012 Lone Mountain Ranch House, Golden, New Mexico, United States
- 2009 Woodstock Farm, Woodstock, Vermont, United States
- 2007 Amangiri Resort, Utah, United States
- 2006 Ventana Canyon Residence, Tucson, Arizona, United States
- 2005 Adobe Canyon Residence, Patagonia, Arizona, United States
- 2005 Desert Nomad House, Tucson, Arizona, United States
- 2001 Tucson Mountain House, Tucson, Arizona, United States
- 2000 Tubac Residence, Tubac, Arizona, United States
- 1999 400 South Rubio Studio, Tucson, Arizona, United States
- 1998 Catalina Mountain Residence, Tucson, Arizona, United States
- 1998 Convent Avenue Studios, Tucson, Arizona, United States

== Awards ==
Awards include:

- 2019 Interior Design Hall of Fame Inductee
- 2019 Record Houses Award
- 2013 Jeff Harnar Award for Contemporary Architecture for Lone Mountain Ranch House near Golden, New Mexico
- 2012 Local Genius Award - Museum of Contemporary Art, Tucson, Arizona
- 2012 University of Arizona Alumni of the Year Award
- 2010 Record Houses Award for Woodstock Farm
- 2009 Mario Pani Award, Universidad de Anahuac, Mexico DF, Mexico
- 2009 Record Houses Award for Ventana Canyon House
- 2008 American Architecture Award for AvraVerde project with exhibitions in the United States, Italy and Greece
- 2005 Record Houses Award for Desert Nomad House
- 2004 National Design Award Winner, Cooper-Hewitt – Smithsonian Institution
- 2002 American Academy of Arts and Letters, Academy Award in Architecture
- 2001 Record House Award for Tubac Residence
- 2001 AIA Arizona Honor Awards for Tubac Residence and Rubio Studio
- 2000 AR+D Emerging Architecture Award
- 2000 The Architectural League of New York Emerging Voices Award
- 2000 I.D. Magazine Annual Design Award for Rubio Avenue Studio
- 2000 AIA Central Arizona Home of the Year for Catalina House
- 1997 Record House Award for Convent Avenue Studios
- 1997 I.D. Magazine Annual Design Award for Convent Avenue Studios
