= Princeton Branch =

Commuter rail line in New Jersey

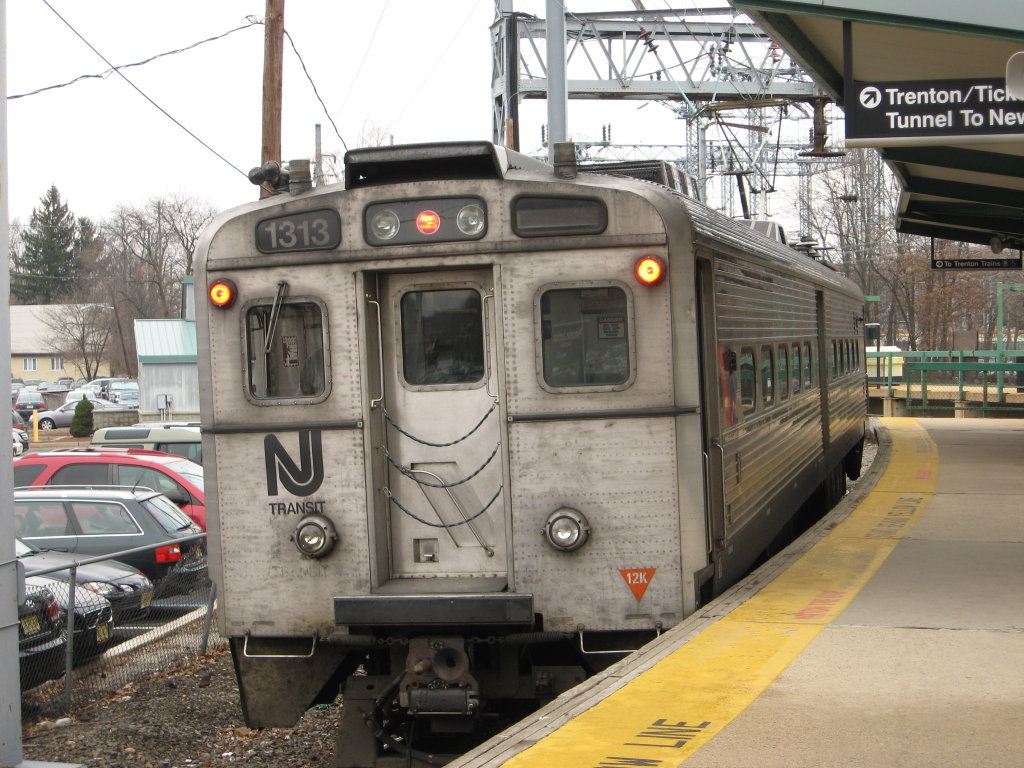
- The "Dinky" at Princeton Junction

Overview
- Owner: New Jersey Transit (since 1984)
- Locale: Mercer County, New Jersey
- Termini: Princeton Junction; Princeton
- Stations: 2

Service
- Type: Commuter rail
- System: New Jersey Transit Rail Operations
- Operator: New Jersey Transit
- Rolling stock: Arrow III railcars
- Daily ridership: 1,021 (FY 2012); 814 (FY 2017)

History
- Opened: 1865

Technical
- Line length: 2.7 mi (4.3 km)
- Track gauge: 4 ft 8 1/2 in (1,435 mm) standard gauge
- Electrification: Overhead line, 12 kV 25 Hz

The Princeton Branch, also known as the Dinky, or the Princeton Junction and Back (PJ&B), is a commuter rail line and service owned and operated by New Jersey Transit (NJT) in the U.S. state of New Jersey. The line is a short branch of the Northeast Corridor Line, running from Princeton Junction northwest to Princeton with no intermediate stops (the line had an intermediate stop, Penns Neck, until 1971). The branch is served by special 1- or 2-car trains. Now running 2.7 mi (4.3 km) along a single track, it is the shortest scheduled commuter rail line in the United States. The run takes approximately 5 minutes in each direction.

At the initiative of Princeton University, the line was shortened by 460 ft (140 m) to construct a new University Arts Center. A new station opened on November 17, 2014.

Service on the Princeton Branch was temporarily suspended and replaced by shuttle buses from October 14, 2018, through May 11, 2019, as part of NJT's systemwide service reductions during the installation and testing of positive train control.

== Service ==
The Princeton Branch provides rail service directly to the Princeton University campus from Princeton Junction, where New Jersey Transit and Amtrak provide Northeast Corridor rail service, heading northeast to Newark, New York City, and Boston, and southwest to Trenton, Philadelphia, and Washington, D.C. As of 2016, the branch schedule includes 41 round trips each weekday. The line is served by a two-car set of GE Arrow III self-propelled electric coach cars.

=== Service suspension 2018–19 ===
In September 2018, New Jersey Transit announced that it would suspend all service on the Princeton Branch from mid-October 2018 until mid-January 2019, and provide shuttle bus service instead. The restoration of the train service was postponed until May 12, 2019. Systemwide service reductions were attributed to installing and testing positive train control, compounded by a shortage of train engineers. The automatic braking system will not be installed on the Princeton Branch itself.

== History ==
=== Operational milestones ===
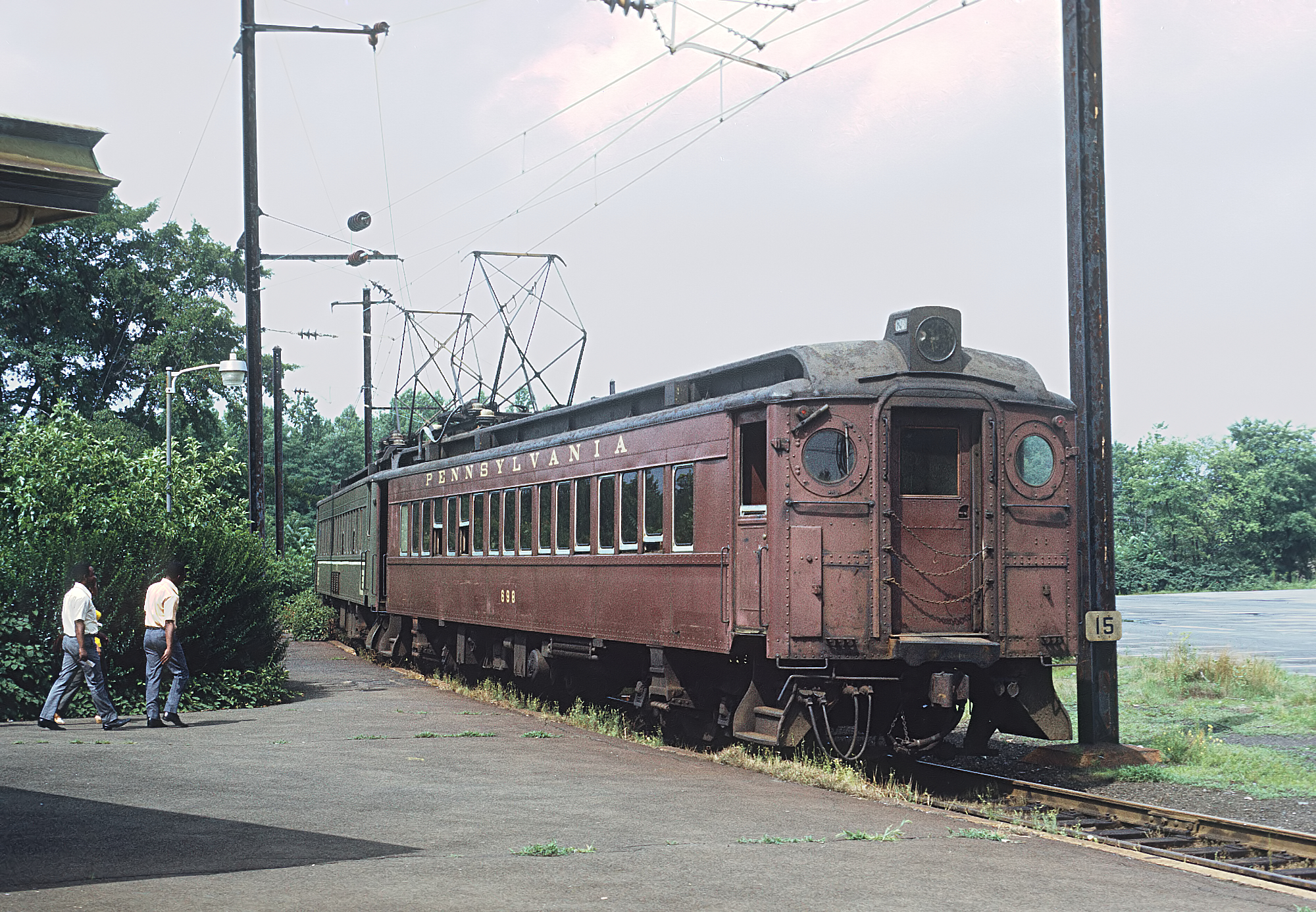
Penn Central "Dinky" at Princeton Junction in 1971

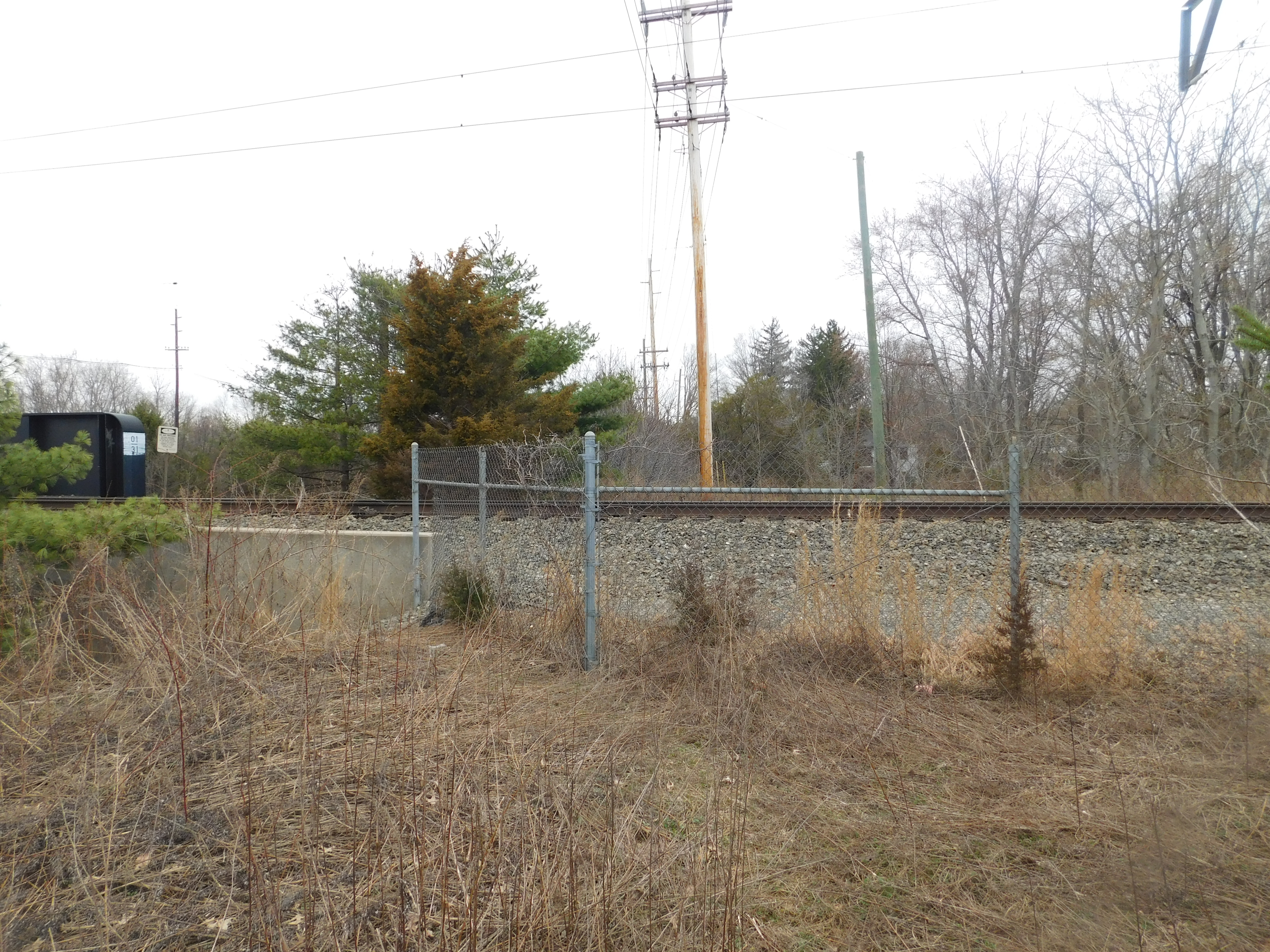
The former Penns Neck station site

When the Camden and Amboy Rail Road and Transportation Company (C&A) opened its original Trenton–New Brunswick line in 1839, completing the first rail connection between Philadelphia and New York Harbor, the line was located along the east bank of the newly completed Delaware and Raritan Canal, about 1 mi (1.6 km) from downtown Princeton. A new alignment (now the Northeast Corridor Line) opened on November 23, 1863. Still, some passenger trains continued to use the old line until the Princeton Branch opened on May 29, 1865, at the end of the American Civil War. The branch's first train used a Grice & Long wood-burning steam dummy for passenger service, and took about 20 minutes each way. The Pennsylvania Railroad leased and began to operate the C&A, including the Princeton Branch, in 1871. The branch was re-aligned and double-tracked in 1905 to handle popular college football weekends, upgraded from coal to a gasoline-electric train in 1933, fully electrified in 1936, and single-tracked again in 1956. The 1956 rail bridge over U.S. Route 1 was replaced in 1994 to allow further widening of the highway.

Penn Central Transportation took over operations in 1968, and discontinued the little-used Penns Neck station in 1971. When Conrail was formed in 1976, the Final System Plan called for the transfer of the Princeton Branch to Conrail and then to the New Jersey Department of Transportation, but the transfer to NJDOT was not made until 1984.

=== University highlights ===
The Princeton train, locally called the "Dinky" or the "PJ&B" (for "Princeton Junction and Back"), is a unique symbol of Princeton University that has grown over time to emblemize the university. It is mentioned in F. Scott Fitzgerald's This Side of Paradise, featured in the television program Family Ties when young Alex Keaton goes for his on-campus interview, and it is also in the 1934 Bing Crosby movie She Loves Me Not. The theme of Princeton and the train is repeated in the university's traditional homecoming song, "Going Back to Nassau Hall" by Kenneth S. Clark (Class of 1905). In it, the lyric "We'll clear the track as we go back" refers to the Princeton Branch track leading to the campus.

The Great Dinky Robbery was an incident on May 3, 1963, in which four men boarded the Dinky and abducted four passengers. Princeton was not yet co-educational, and the Dinky was the usual mode of transportation for women dating members of the then all-male student body. On a Friday evening, four Princeton University students, riding horses in Western attire, ambushed the train as it was arriving at Princeton station. A convertible was parked across the track, forcing the Dinky to halt abruptly. The men, including George R. Bunn Jr. of the Bunn coffee maker family, who was armed with a pistol loaded with blanks, boarded the train and persuaded four female passengers to leave with them. The Dinky later resumed its trip and arrived at Princeton station. Although the university administrators were aware of the event and may have known who was involved, they took no official action.

=== Princeton station relocation and controversy ===
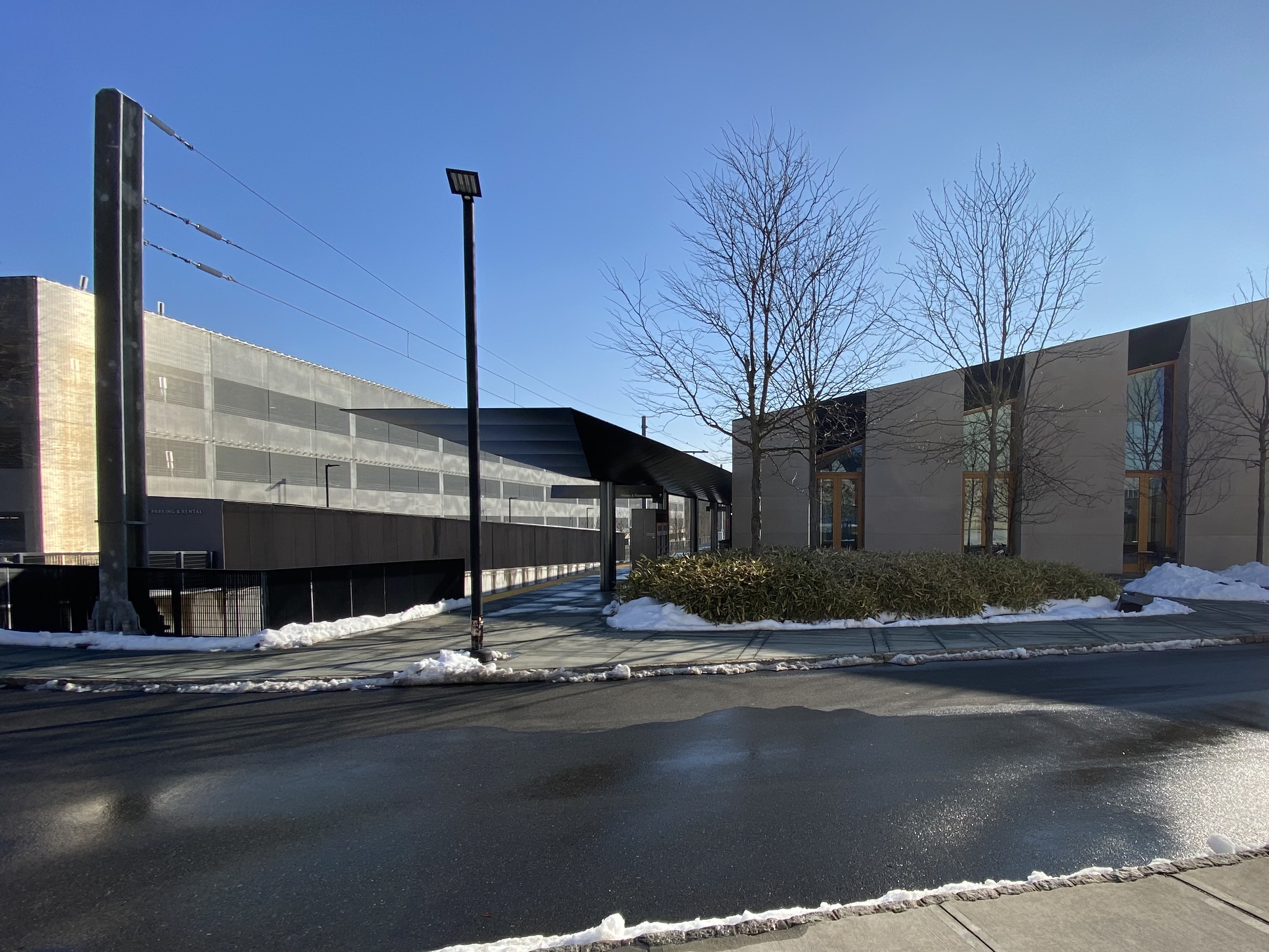
The new Princeton station

In 2006, Princeton University announced its intention to construct a new arts center, calling for the replacement of the 1918 Princeton station house, the shortening of the trackage right-of-way, and the creation of a new terminus 460 ft (140 m) to the south. Rail advocates opposed the relocation, fearing that access to the new station would be less convenient, resulting in decreased ridership that could "threaten the train's existence." The proposal prompted protest from residents, students, faculty and alumni, and led to the creation of the organization Save the Dinky and a lengthy series of legal challenges. In October 2010, the Princeton Regional Planning Board passed a resolution supporting the continuation of train service. The new Princeton station opened on November 17, 2014, with construction continuing on a complex of arts and dining buildings in the surrounding area. As of 2017, weekday ridership was down 20 percent from 2012, the last full year of the old station.

== Proposed Transitway ==
The Delaware Valley Regional Planning Commission and New Jersey Transit have conducted studies to develop the Central New Jersey Route 1 Bus Rapid Transit Project. Parts of the proposals call for the construction of a "Dinky Transitway" along the Princeton Branch right-of-way, which would incorporate the rail service and add exclusive bus lanes and a greenway for bicycle and pedestrian traffic.

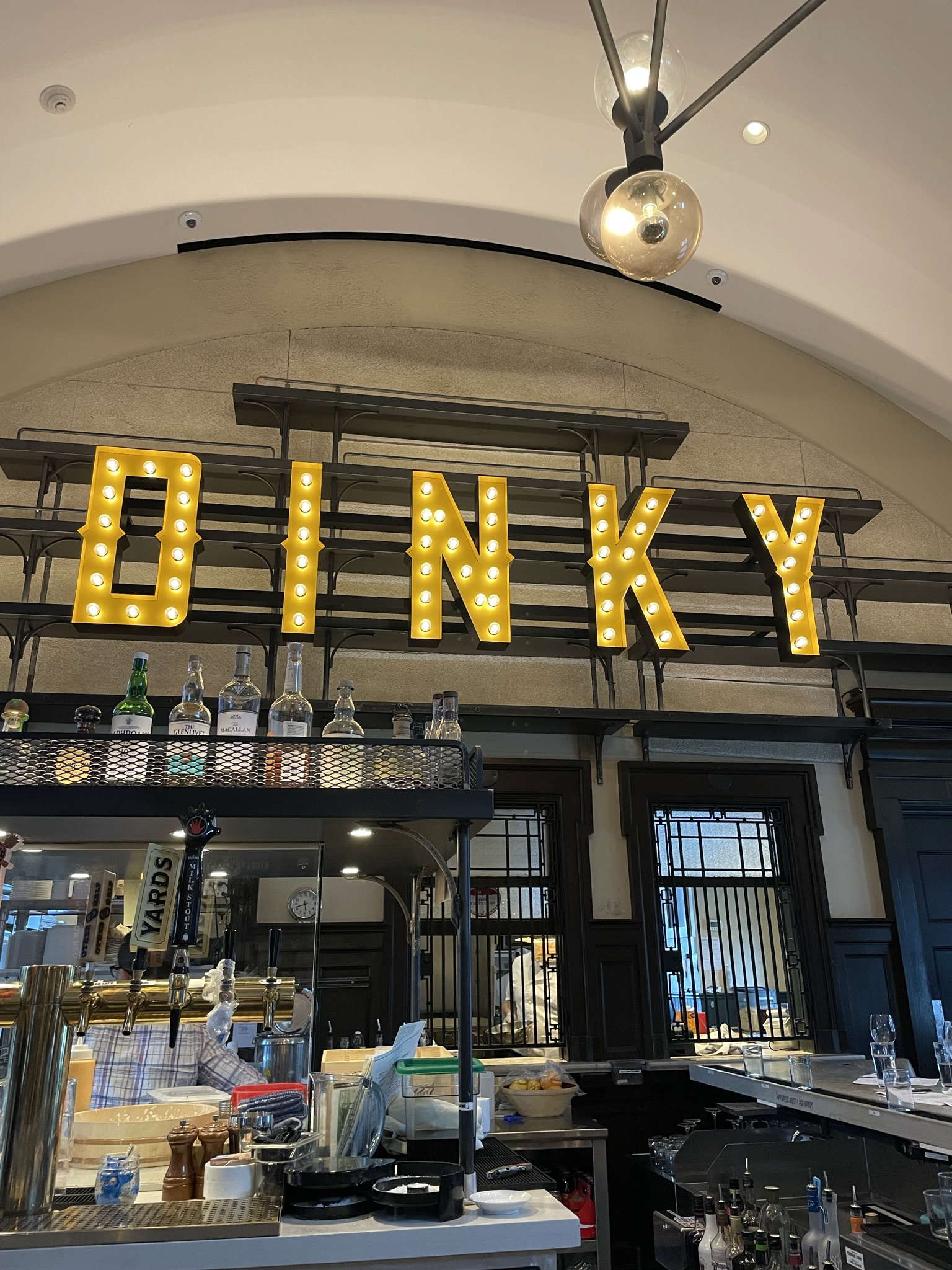
"Dinky" Sign at The Dinky Bar & Kitchen in Princeton, NJ

In April 2012, the university submitted a revised plan for the arts and transit center, calling for extending the station's freight house onto the right-of-way for possible use as a restaurant. The Regional Planning Board introduced an ordinance requiring the land to be preserved for a transportation right-of-way that could eventually extend farther into Princeton's central business district at Nassau Street. According to the university, ownership of the trackage would have to change hands for the transitway to be implemented. Approvals were subsequently issued for converting the station house and the extended freight house into a pair of restaurants. The station house is now occupied by The Dinky Bar & Kitchen, which opened in 2016.

== Stations ==
Zone	Location	Station	Miles (km) from NYP	Date opened	Date closed	Connections / Notes
19	West Windsor	Princeton Junction	48.4 (77.9)	1864		Amtrak: Northeast Regional, Keystone Service, Vermonter; NJ Transit Rail: Northeast Corridor Line; NJ Transit Bus: 600, 612
19	West Windsor	Penns Neck	49.7 (80.0)	1865–1875	January 31, 1971	Demolished, just southeast of U.S. Route 1
19	Princeton	Princeton	51.1 (82.2)	1865, 1918, 2014		NJ Transit Bus: 605; Princeton Tiger Transit: Free-B Commuter, West Line, Stanworth Line
