= Princetown (disambiguation) =

Princetown may refer to:

- Princetown, a village on Dartmoor, Devon, England
  - Princetown Prison, former name of HM Prison Dartmoor
- Princetown, Caerphilly, a location in Caerphilly County Borough, Wales
- Princeton, Kentucky, founded as Princetown
- Princetown, New York, a town in Schenectady County, New York, United States
- Princetown, Prince Edward Island, the former shire town of Prince County, Prince Edward Island, Canada
- Princetown, Victoria, a small town on the Great Ocean Road in Victoria, Australia

== See also ==
- Princeton (disambiguation)
