= Princeton (disambiguation) =

Princeton University is an Ivy League university in Princeton, New Jersey, United States.

Princeton may also refer to:

== Schools ==
- Princeton Theological Seminary, Princeton, New Jersey, United States
- Princeton Day School, Princeton, New Jersey, United States
- Princeton Academy of the Sacred Heart, Princeton, New Jersey, United States
- Princeton Friends School, New Jersey, United States
- Princeton Junior School, Lawrence Township, Mercer County, New Jersey, United States
- Princeton Regional Schools, New Jersey, United States
- Princeton Secondary School, Princeton, British Columbia, Canada

== Places ==
=== United States ===
- Princeton, Alabama, an unincorporated community
- Princeton, Arkansas, an unincorporated community in Dallas County
- Princeton Township, Dallas County, Arkansas
- Princeton, California, an unincorporated town in Colusa County
- Princeton, California, former name of Mount Bullion, Mariposa County, California
- Princeton, Florida, a census-designated place
- Princeton, Idaho, an unincorporated census-designated place
- Princeton, Illinois, a city and county seat
- Princeton Township, Bureau County, Illinois
- Princeton, Indiana, a city and county seat
- Princeton Township, White County, Indiana
- Princeton, Iowa, a city
- Princeton Township, Scott County, Iowa
- Princeton, Kansas, a city
- Princeton, Kentucky, a city and county seat
- Princeton, Louisiana, an unincorporated community
- Princeton, Maine, a town
- Princeton, Massachusetts, a town
- Princeton, Minnesota, a city
- Princeton Township, Mille Lacs County, Minnesota
- Princeton, Missouri, a city and county seat
- Princeton, Montana, an unincorporated community
- Princeton, Nebraska, an unincorporated community
- Princeton, New Jersey, a municipality, and the most populated place named "Princeton"
  - Borough of Princeton, New Jersey, a former municipality now absorbed into the above
  - Princeton Township, New Jersey, a former municipality now absorbed into the above
- Princeton, North Carolina, a town
- Princeton, South Carolina, a census-designated place
- Princeton, Texas, a city
- Princeton, Newton County, Texas, a ghost town
- Princeton, West Virginia, a city and county seat
- Princeton, Wisconsin, a city
- Princeton (town), Wisconsin
- Mount Princeton, Colorado
- Princeton Glacier, Alaska

=== Canada ===
- Princeton, British Columbia, a town
- Princeton, Newfoundland and Labrador, a settlement
- Princeton, Ontario, a community

=== Antarctica ===
- Princeton Tarn, Victoria Land, a tarn (mountain lake)

== Other ==
- Princeton (given name)
- Princeton, a member of the boy band Mindless Behavior
- Princeton, a character in the stage musical Avenue Q
- Princeton: A Search for Answers, a 1973 Oscar-winning documentary
- Princeton (band), an indie pop band from Los Angeles
- Princeton (electronics company), a computer hardware and electronics company in Tokyo, Japan
- Princeton Graphics Systems, a defunct manufacturer of computer monitors based in the United States
- Battle of Princeton, an American Revolutionary War battle fought in 1777
- Chazz Princeton, a character in Yu-Gi-Oh! GX
- Fender Princeton, a guitar amplifier
- Ivy League (haircut), also known as a Princeton
- The Princeton Review, a test preparation service
- Ulmus americana 'Princeton', a cultivar of the American elm tree
- USS Princeton, various ships
- Princeton University Press, an American publisher

== See also ==
- Princeton High School (disambiguation)
- Princeton station (disambiguation)
- Princeton-by-the-Sea, California, an unincorporated community, United States
- New Princeton, Oregon, an unincorporated community, United States
