= Penns Neck station =

Former commuter railway station

Penns Neck
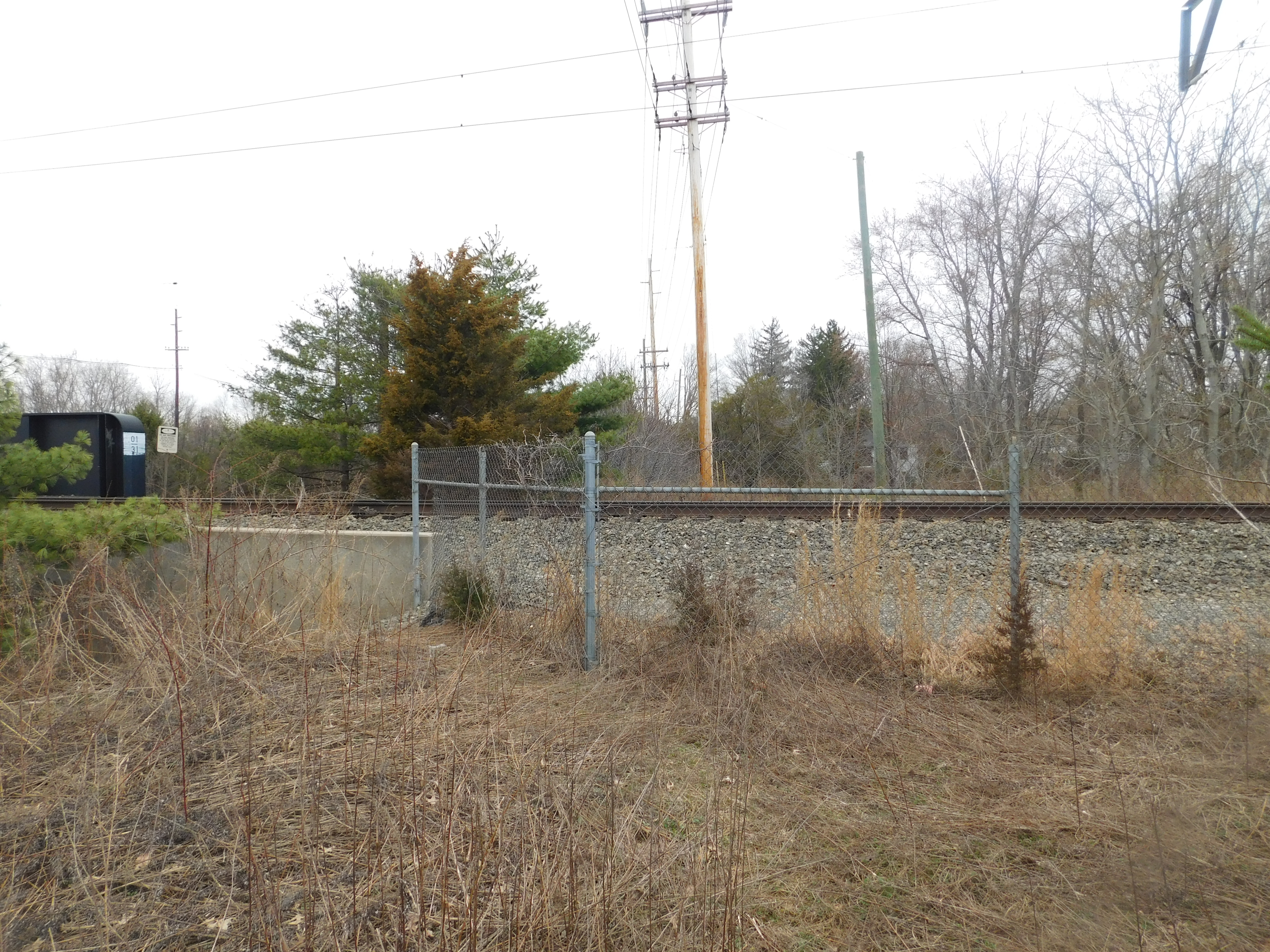
- Site of the demolished station, as seen in 2016, with rail bridge (at left) above U.S. Route 1

General information
- Location: U.S. Route 1, midway between Alexander and Washington Roads; West Windsor Township, New Jersey
- Coordinates: 40°19′44″N 74°38′26″W
- System: Former Pennsylvania Railroad station
- Line: Princeton Branch

History
- Opened: 1865–1875
- Closed: January 31, 1971
- Electrified: 1936

Former services
Preceding station	Pennsylvania Railroad	Following station
Princeton Terminus	Princeton Branch	Princeton Junction Terminus
Location

Penns Neck was a railway station of the Pennsylvania Railroad, in the Penns Neck neighborhood of West Windsor Township, New Jersey. It opened sometime between 1865 and 1875 as an intermediate stop on the newly completed Princeton Branch line, near its midpoint where it crossed the turnpike that is now U.S. Route 1. The location was originally a grade crossing and later a rail bridge.

Penn Central Transportation took over operations in 1968 and discontinued the little-used station on January 31, 1971. The branch line still provides frequent service between Princeton station (on the Princeton University campus) and Princeton Junction (on the Northeast Corridor), as part of NJ Transit Rail Operations.
