= Princeton (given name) =

Princeton is a given name. Notable people with the name include:

- Princeton Fant (born 1999), American football player
- Princeton Kwong (born 1989), American figure skater
- Princeton Lyman (1935–2018), American diplomat
- Princeton Owusu-Ansah (born 1976), Ghanaian footballer
