= Princeton High School =

Princeton High School may refer to:

- Princeton High School (Illinois), Princeton, Illinois
- Princeton Community High School, Princeton, Indiana
- Princeton High School (Minnesota), Princeton, Minnesota
- Princeton Junior-Senior High School, Princeton, Missouri
- Princeton High School (North Carolina), Princeton, North Carolina
- Princeton High School (New Jersey), Princeton, New Jersey
- Princeton High School (Sharonville, Ohio)
- Princeton High School (Texas), Princeton, Texas
- Princeton High School (West Virginia), Princeton, West Virginia
- Princeton High School (Wisconsin), Princeton, Wisconsin
