= Princeton station (NJ Transit) =

NJ Transit rail station

Princeton
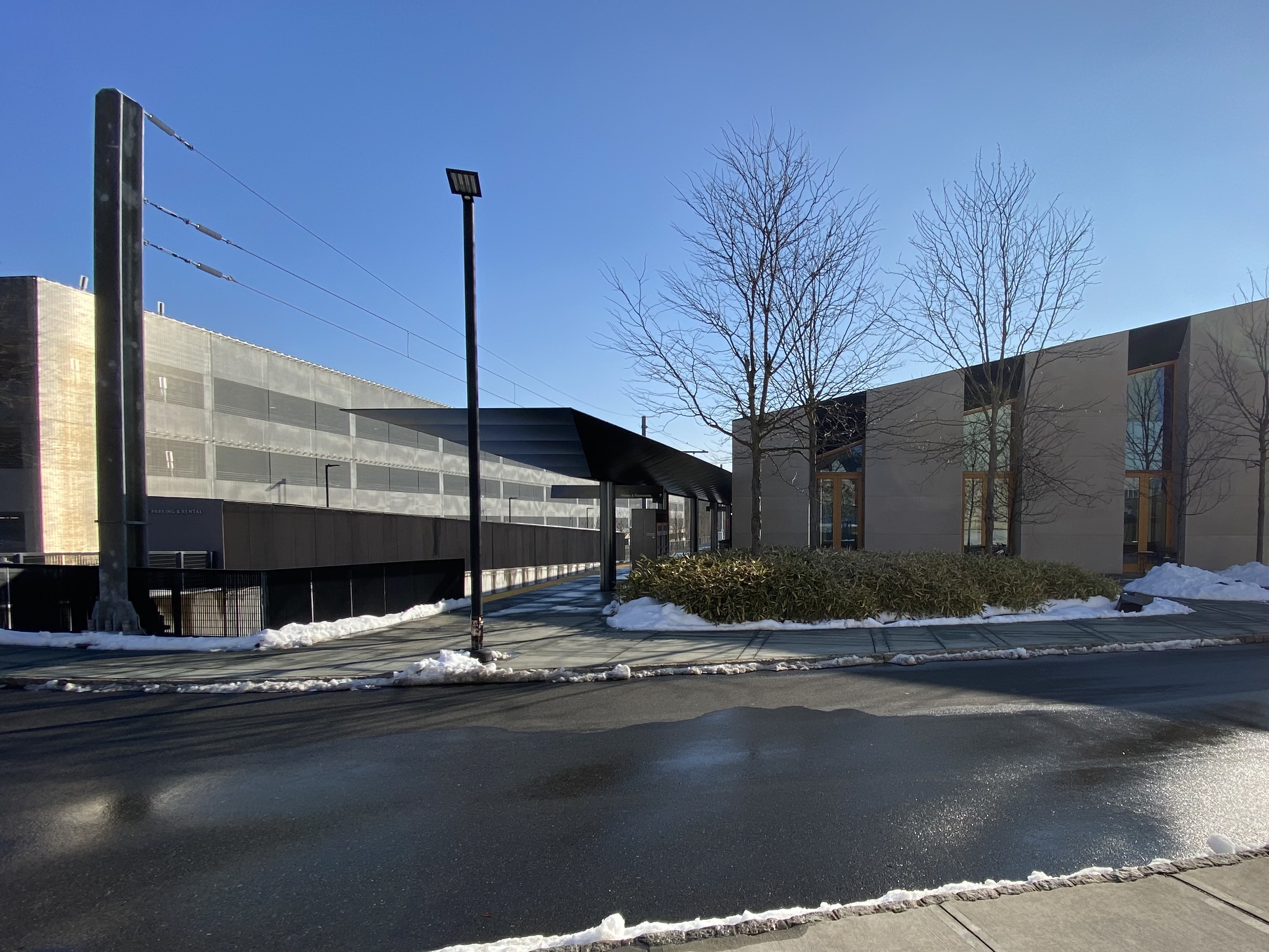
- The 2014 station pictured from across the street

General information
- Location: Alexander Street, 1 block south of University Place; Princeton, New Jersey 08540
- Coordinates: 40.3421°N 74.6589°W
- Owner: Princeton University
- Operator: NJ Transit
- Line: Princeton Branch
- Platforms: 1 side platform
- Tracks: 1
- Connections: : NJT Bus: 605 : Princeton University Tiger Transit: Route 4, Route 5 : Princeton Free-B Shuttle

Construction
- Parking: Yes
- Cycle facilities: Yes
- Accessible: Yes
- Architect: Rick Joy

Other information
- Fare zone: 19

History
- Opened: 1865
- Rebuilt: 1918, 2014

Passengers
- 2025: 559 (average weekday)
- Rank: 50 of 153

Services
| Preceding station | NJ Transit | Following station |
|---|---|---|
| Terminus | Princeton Branch | Princeton Junction Terminus |
Former services
| Preceding station | Pennsylvania Railroad | Following station |
|---|---|---|
| Terminus | Princeton Branch | Penns Neck toward Princeton Junction |
- Princeton Railroad Station (1918)
- U.S. Historic district – Contributing property
- New Jersey Register of Historic Places
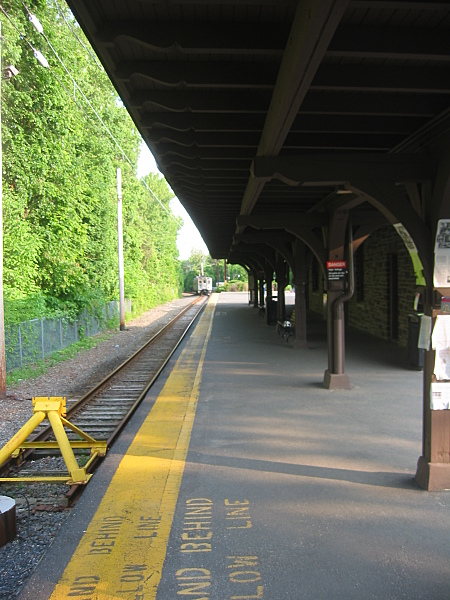
- 1918 station (2003 photo)
- Interactive map of Princeton Railroad Station (1918)
- Location: Princeton, New Jersey, USA
- Coordinates: 40.3435°N 74.6594°W
- Built: 1918
- Architect: Alexander C. Shand
- Architectural style: Collegiate Gothic
- Part of: Princeton Historic District (ID75001143 (Note: The 1918 station was listed as eligible for the National Register and was marked as part of a historic district in the Operating Passenger Railroad Stations Thematic Resources filing. It was not given an individual NRHP registration number. The station lies just to the south of the Princeton Historic District, according to the verbal boundary description from the district's original nomination form.))
- MPS: Operating Passenger Railroad Stations TR
- NJRHP No.: 1742

Significant dates
- Designated CP: June 27, 1975
- Designated NJRHP: March 17, 1984
Location

Princeton is the northern terminus of the Princeton Branch commuter rail service operated by NJ Transit (NJT), and is located on the Princeton University campus in Princeton, New Jersey. At the branch's southern end at Princeton Junction, connections are available to NJT's Northeast Corridor Line and peak-hour Amtrak trains. The shuttle train between the two stations is known as the "Dinky", and has also been known as the "PJ&B", for "Princeton Junction and Back". Now running 2.7 mi (4.3 km) along a single track, it is the shortest scheduled commuter rail line in the United States. Initial studies have been conducted to add a bus transitway along the Dinky right-of-way as part of a proposed bus rapid transit system.

Service on the Princeton Branch was suspended from October 14, 2018, through May 11, 2019, replaced by shuttle buses, as part of NJT's systemwide service reductions during the installation and testing of positive train control.

Plans to relocate Princeton station 460 ft (140 m) south, proposed by the university in 2006 and approved by NJT and the Princeton Regional Planning Board, were met with opposition from some commuters, residents, alumni, and transportation advocates. The historic 1918 train station closed permanently on August 23, 2013. Approximately 1,200 ft (370 m) to the southeast, a temporary station operated from August 26, 2013, through November 9, 2014, accompanied by various bus routes shuttling among the old station, the temporary station, and Princeton Junction. The new permanent Princeton station, designed by architect Rick Joy, opened on November 17, 2014, with construction continuing on a complex of arts and dining buildings in the surrounding area. The new station includes a Wawa store, which originally opened in 1974 next to the old station.

== History ==
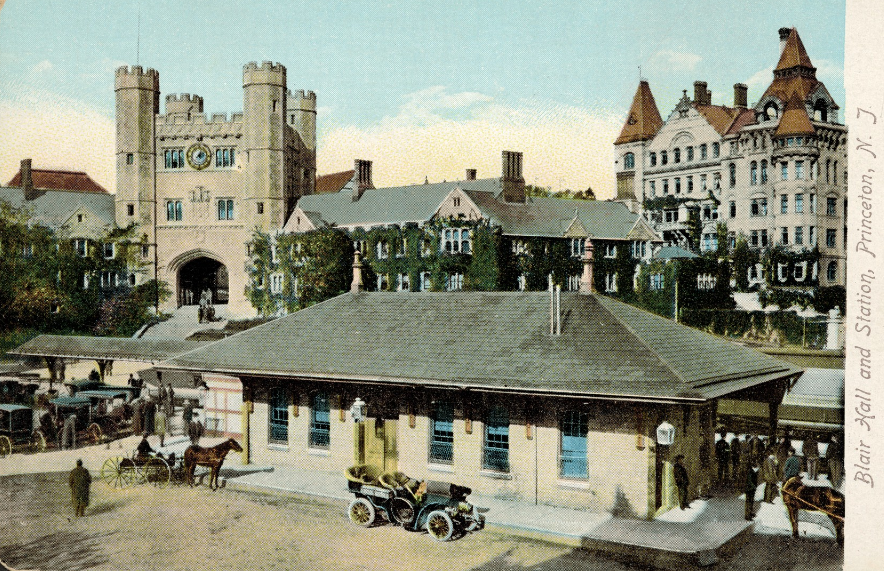
1865 location (c. 1910 postcard)

The original 1865 location of Princeton station, in what became the university's Blair Courtyard, 0.15 mi (0.24 km) south of Nassau Street, was replaced by the 1918 station, built on a site 0.25 mi (0.40 km) further south. The historic 1918 station was constructed when the branch was part of the Pennsylvania Railroad (PRR) under the direction of architect-engineer Alexander C. Shand, who had also overseen construction of the now-demolished Philadelphia Broad Street Station. Designed in the Collegiate Gothic style, the 1918 Princeton station contained a stone station house, a stone freight house, and a canopy-covered platform. The station has been owned by several different parties since the PRR era: Penn Central (1968–1976), Conrail (1976–June 1984), New Jersey Department of Transportation, New Jersey Transit Rail Operations (to October 1984), and Princeton University. It was listed on the New Jersey Register of Historic Places and the National Register of Historic Places in 1984 as part of the Operating Passenger Railroad Stations Thematic Resource.

== Relocation controversy ==
In 2006, Princeton University announced its intention to construct a new arts center, calling for the replacement of the 1918 station house, the shortening of the trackage right-of-way, and the creation of a new terminus 460 ft (140 m) to the south. Rail advocates opposed the relocation, fearing that access to the new station would be less convenient, resulting in decreased ridership that could "threaten the train's existence." The proposal prompted protest from residents, students, faculty and alumni, and led to the creation of the organization Save the Dinky.

In October 2010, the Princeton Regional Planning Board passed a resolution supporting the continuation of train service. On October 3, 2011, Save the Dinky and four local residents filed suit against the university and NJT to stop the move. Meanwhile, the borough, township, and university prepared a memo of understanding in which the school promised to fund a transit study and provide other benefits in exchange for rezoning for the combined arts/transit project.

The station house has been the property of the university since 1984, when it purchased it from NJT, with guarantees of public use. That year it was listed on the state historic register (ID#1742) and in a thematic survey for the National Register of Historic Places. In 2012, NJT requested abandonment of that public use from the state Historic Preservation Office. Save the Dinky contended that the move would breach the original agreement when the property was transferred, would cause inconvenience, and would be poor planning. The university considered it to be a necessary improvement for redevelopment of the neighborhood.

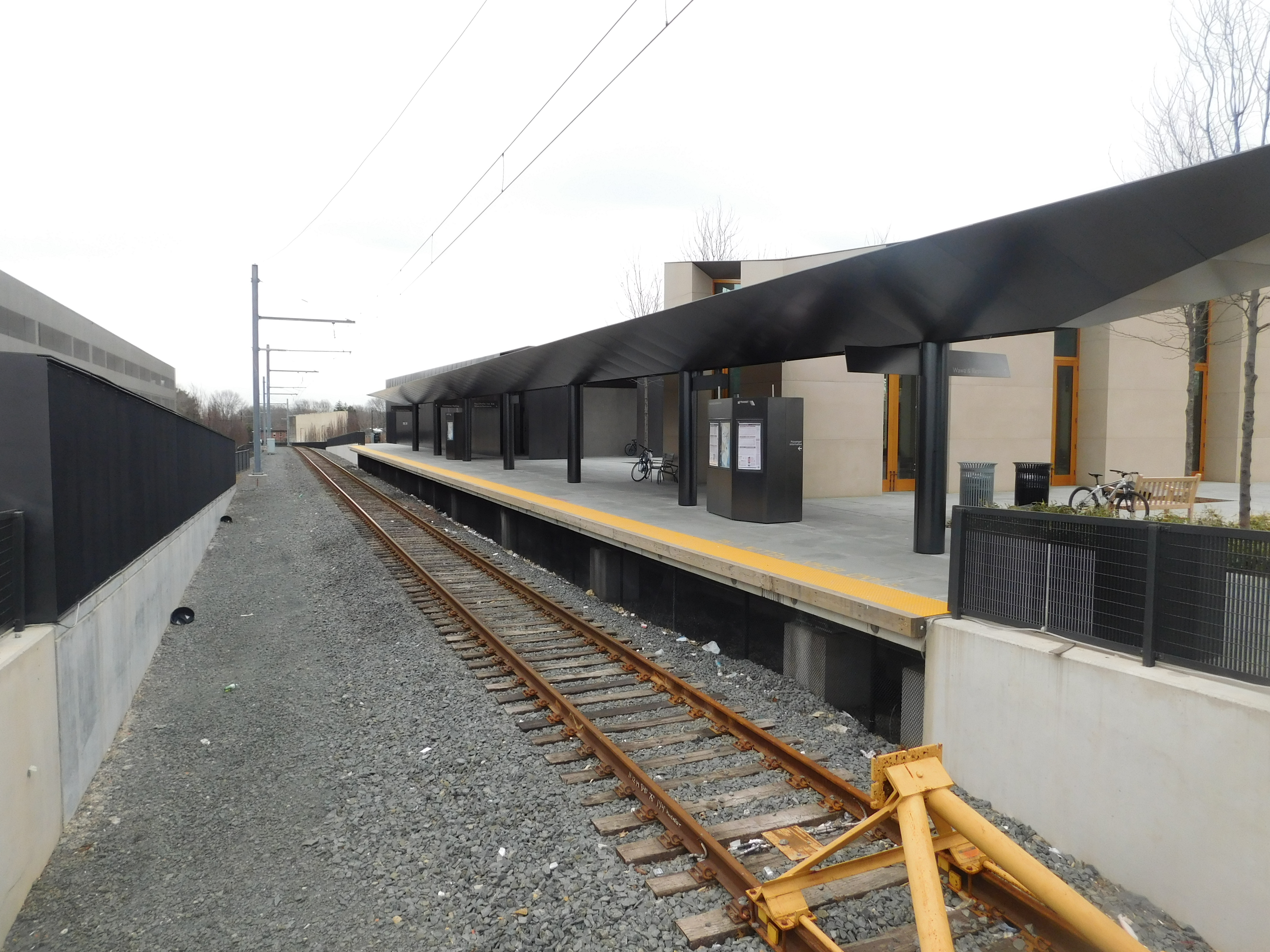
Current 2014 station platform

In December 2012, the Regional Planning Board gave approval for the project to proceed. In June 2013, NJT approved a property transfer agreement with the university, involving three parcels around the station and the proposed arts center. The U.S. Surface Transportation Board declined a petition to review the planned move. The New Jersey court system dismissed the 2011 lawsuit in December 2013, and a related appeal in March 2014, and a follow-up petition in July 2014, and a challenge against the Regional Planning Board in January 2015, and two further appeals in February 2016. As of 2017, weekday ridership was down 20 percent from 2012, the last full year of the old station.

== Dinky Transitway ==
The Delaware Valley Regional Planning Commission and New Jersey Transit have conducted studies to develop the Central New Jersey Route 1 Bus Rapid Transit Project. Parts of the proposals call for the construction of a "Dinky Transitway" along the Princeton Branch right-of-way, which would incorporate the rail service and add exclusive bus lanes and a greenway for bicycle and pedestrian traffic. In 2011, NJT indicated that moving the station would not be detrimental to its planning.

In April 2012, the university submitted a revised plan for the arts and transit center, calling for the extension of the station's freight house onto the right-of-way for possible use as a restaurant. The Regional Planning Board introduced an ordinance requiring the land be preserved for a transportation right-of-way that could eventually extend farther into the central business district at Nassau Street. According to the university, ownership of the trackage would have to change hands in order for the extended transitway to be implemented. Approvals were subsequently issued for converting the station house and the expanded freight house into a pair of restaurants, preserving two original ticket windows for kitchen views, and using the wooden arrival/departure boards as overhead menus. The Dinky Bar & Kitchen opened in the old station in 2016.
