= Princeton Junction station =

NJ Transit and Amtrak station

Princeton Junction at West Windsor
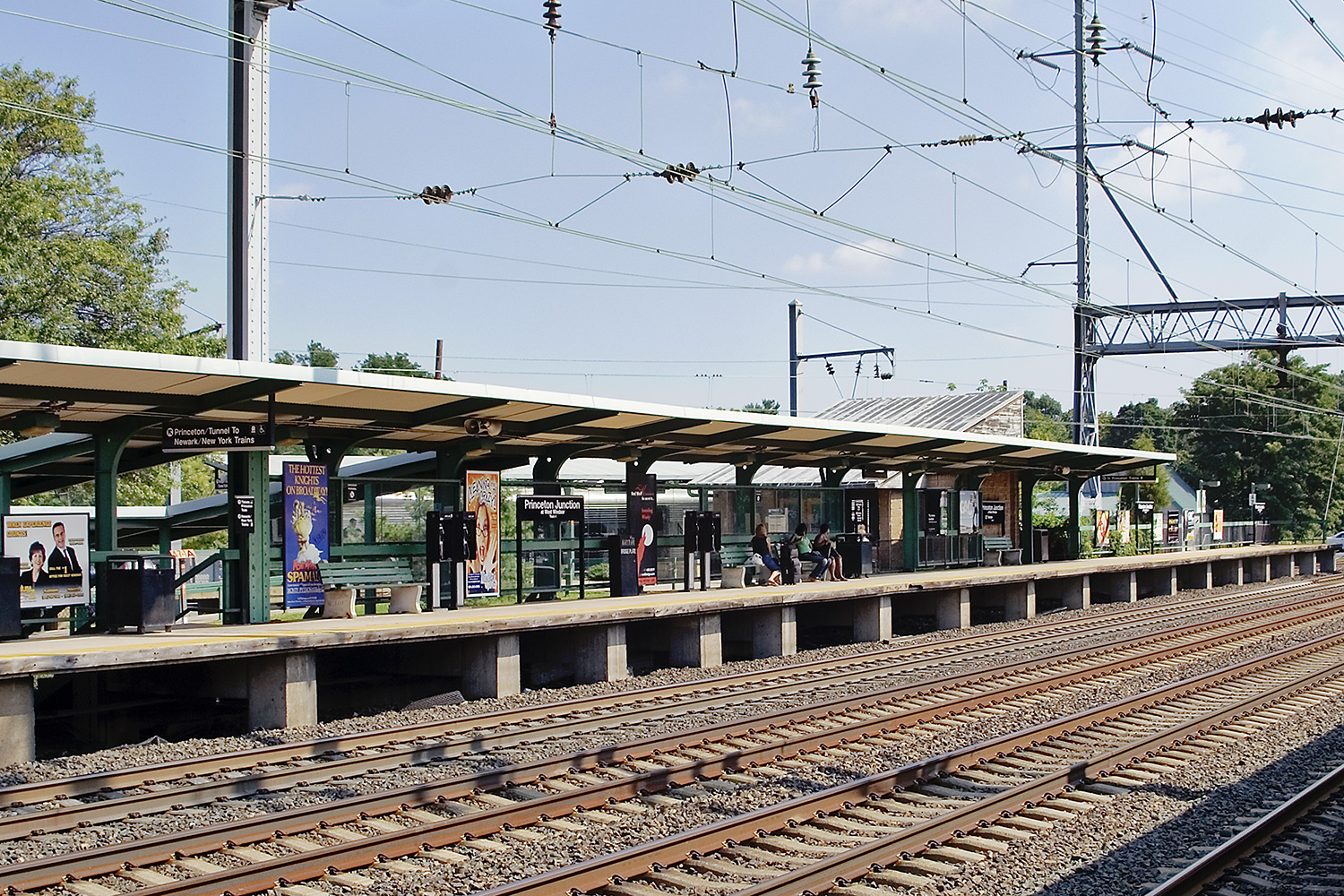
- Princeton Junction station in 2006

General information
- Location: 2 Wallace Circle; Princeton Junction, New Jersey; United States
- Coordinates: 40.3167°N 74.6233°W
- Owner: New Jersey Transit
- Lines: Amtrak Northeast Corridor; NJ Transit Princeton Branch
- Platforms: 3 side platforms
- Tracks: 4 (Northeast Corridor); 1 (Princeton Branch)
- Connections: NJ Transit Bus: 600, 612; Tiger Transit: Route 4

Construction
- Parking: 4,161 spaces
- Accessible: Yes

Other information
- Station code: Amtrak: PJC
- IATA code: ZTJ
- Fare zone: 19 (NJT)

History
- Opened: November 23, 1863
- Electrified: January 16, 1933 (partial service); February 1, 1933 (full service)

Key dates
- December 27, 1953: Station depot burned

Passengers
NJ Transit
- 2025: 4,494 (average weekday)
- Rank: 5 of 153
Amtrak
- FY 2025: 136,236 annually

Services
Preceding station	Amtrak	Following station
Trenton toward Harrisburg	Keystone Service Limited service	New Brunswick toward New York
Trenton toward Norfolk, Newport News or Roanoke	Northeast Regional	New Brunswick toward Boston South or Springfield
Acela does not stop here
Cardinal does not stop here
Carolinian does not stop here
Crescent does not stop here
Palmetto does not stop here
Pennsylvanian does not stop here
Silver Meteor does not stop here
Vermonter does not stop here
Preceding station	NJ Transit	Following station
Hamilton toward Trenton	Northeast Corridor Line	Jersey Avenue weekdays toward New York
Princeton Terminus	Princeton Branch	Terminus
Former services
Preceding station	Pennsylvania Railroad	Following station
Trenton toward Chicago	Main Line	Plainsboro toward New York or Exchange Place
Penns Neck toward Princeton	Princeton Branch	Terminus
Preceding station	Amtrak	Following station
Trenton toward New Orleans	Crescent	New Brunswick toward New York
Trenton toward Pittsburgh	Pennsylvanian	Newark Penn toward New York
Location

Princeton Junction station (signed as Princeton Junction at West Windsor) is a railroad station in Princeton Junction, a section of West Windsor Township, Mercer County, New Jersey. The station services both New Jersey Transit's Northeast Corridor Line and Princeton Branch services along with the Keystone Service and Northeast Regional and of Amtrak. Other Amtrak services bypass the station. Princeton Junction station contains two high-level side platforms to service Northeast Corridor Line and Amtrak services, which use the four mainline tracks. There is also a single high-level side platform and a single track that services the Princeton Branch.

Service at Princeton Junction began on November 23, 1863, when a single track of a new alignment of the Camden and Amboy Railroad opened between Clinton Street station in Trenton and the Deans Pond section of South Brunswick in Middlesex County, replacing main line service through downtown Princeton. Service on the branch line to replace it began on May 29, 1865. The first station depot built at Princeton Junction burned down in a fire on August 7, 1892. The new station depot that replaced it in 1893 came down in another fire, this one on December 27, 1953. The current station was built in the 1980s.

== History ==
=== Construction and first fire (1863–1893) ===
Railroad service through West Windsor dates back to the realignment of the Camden and Amboy Railroad from Princeton via Kingston. The railroad closed bids for a new direct line between the Deans Pond section of South Brunswick on April 13, 1863. Construction re-started in June 1863. The first train crossed this stretch on November 23, when a single track opened between Clinton Street station in Trenton and Deans Pond. A new station called Princeton Junction opened with this new line and a new stagecoach was approved to bring people from Princeton to the new rail alignment in January 1864. The railroad approved a new branch to Princeton on April 25, 1864, purchasing a new rail car for the line on September 26. The second track opened on September 26, 1864, eliminating all but one train via Kingston. The railroad would offer a horse-drawn omnibus service to Princeton from Princeton Junction. The new Princeton Branch opened on May 29, 1865, eliminating the omnibus service and passenger service via Kingston. The alignment between Princeton and Trenton was removed in June 1865 and by September, the entire line to Kingston had been removed. That same month, the railroad built a new turntable and a freight depot at Princeton Junction to facilitate smoother service on the branch.

The original station depot at Princeton Junction, built in 1865, caught fire on the morning of August 7, 1892. The fire resulted in the complete demolition of the station depot and everything inside it. No source was found for the fire in a following investigation. The railroad announced that they would replace the station depot. By December 1892, the railroad announced that the new station depot would be a three-story tall brick building with a hardwood interior with then-modern conveniences for passengers. The new station opened in 1893.

=== Death of Charles Rogers (1913–1916) ===
The condition of the tracks at Princeton Junction became a problem with the death of a local cement contractor, Charles Rogers, of Bradley Beach in Monmouth County. On June 13, 1913, Rogers was on his way back to the farm in the area that he had purchased for the family. His wife was waiting for him on a platform nearby to get him to the family wagon to the farm. After departing his train, Rogers stepped across the tracks to access a telephone and was struck by a nearby freight train. The station had a physical grade crossing near the station depot that provided access to a nearby hotel, where the telephone was located. Due to some freight cars on a siding at the station, Rogers' view was inhibited of the oncoming freight. After being crushed, his wife passed out on the platform and taken for emergency medical care. The Mercer County Coroner informed her of her husband's death and she was taken by automobile to Princeton where the family wagon would meet her.

A coroner's hearing held on June 21 declared that the railroad was responsible for the death of Rogers because of the grade crossing. The railroad had left the grade crossing unstaffed and that if someone had been watching the tracks at the crossing, Rogers' death would have been prevented. The coroner's hearing also recommended that the railroad should build a tunnel under the tracks to prevent a repeat of the same type of incident. Lena Rogers sued the railroad in the Supreme Court of New Jersey in January 1914 for $25,000 for the death of her husband. Trial began on March 3, 1916, after the railroad's petition to dismiss was denied by the judge. The railroad claimed that Rogers had not performed due diligence before crossing the tracks for the telephone. On March 7, the court ruled that the railroad would have to pay Rogers' estate $5,000 due to the negligence of the railroad, one-fifth of what was asked by the Rogers family.

=== Second fire, decline and rebuilding (1953–1986) ===
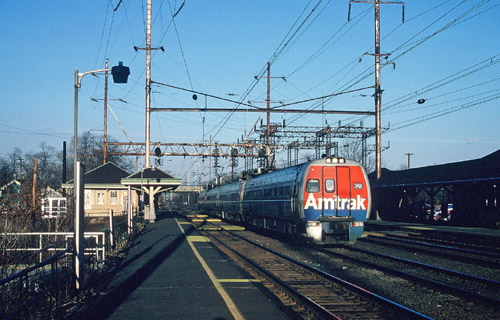
Amtrak Metroliner passing through the station in 1978

The second fire to ravage a station depot at Princeton Junction occurred on December 27, 1953. The caretaker, Virginia Worillow, a 62-year old lady, was rescued from the depot by the New Jersey State Police and a local fire department. Worillow noted that mice had a habit of biting through electrical wires at Princeton Junction station, leading to a fire several years prior. This time, the entire depot was demolished and her dog was killed in the fire. In January 1955, the Pennsylvania Railroad announced that they would remove one track from the Princeton Branch and some of the yard tracks at the Princeton Yard. All the yard tracks would be turned over to Princeton University and cut $10,000 from their taxes. Their intent was to keep operating the service but just with one track.

In 1965, a prototype for the high-speed Metroliner passed through the station at the record speed (at that time) of 164 miles per hour (264 km/h) on a short demonstration run. Very few sections of the Northeast Corridor were capable of handling that speed, and most had to be upgraded before Penn Central's Metroliner service was introduced in 1969. A speed of 170.8 mph (274.9 km/h) was achieved on the same portion of the track on December 20, 1967, when the U.S.-built UAC TurboTrain set the rail speed record in North America. A plaque at the station commemorates the event.

In June 1983, New Jersey Transit purchased 12 active and four closed stations from Amtrak along the line, including Princeton Junction for $408,000. In September 1986, West Windsor Township agreed to lease the station from NJ Transit through 1991, with options to extend the agreement. West Windsor would implement its own parking system and 650 parking spaces would be added to the station for the 4,000 commuters of NJ Transit and Amtrak that used the station.

Amtrak began experimental service at Princeton Junction on April 28, 1986, with Metroliner train 101 from New York Penn Station stopping at 6:41 a.m. on its way to Washington Union Station. A northbound Metroliner from Washington Union would stop at Princeton Junction at 7:06 p.m. Amtrak's experimental service was because the area had growth that the rail organization wanted to tap into. The installation of high-level side platforms at Princeton Junction also aided in their decision making.

=== Recent history ===
The present station house was built in 1987. Most of Amtrak's Princeton Junction service prior to 2005 was Clocker service commuter traffic to New York, Newark, or Philadelphia. On October 28, 2005, the Clockers were replaced by NJT trains that run only as far south as Trenton.

The northbound Crescent stopped here from November 24, 2022, to July 4, 2023. On October 13, 2023, Amtrak announced Princeton Junction station, along with New Brunswick station, would receive upgraded service due to increased demand.

== Service and station layout ==
The station has two high-level side platforms for main Northeast Corridor service, along with a single side platform for the Princeton Branch services. Most of Amtrak's Northeast Corridor lines bypass the station via the inner tracks, except for select Keystone Service and Northeast Regional trains and the weekday southbound Palmetto. The next northbound station is Jersey Avenue, but all northbound trains originating in Trenton skip this station and service New Brunswick, with other trains originating at Jersey Avenue.

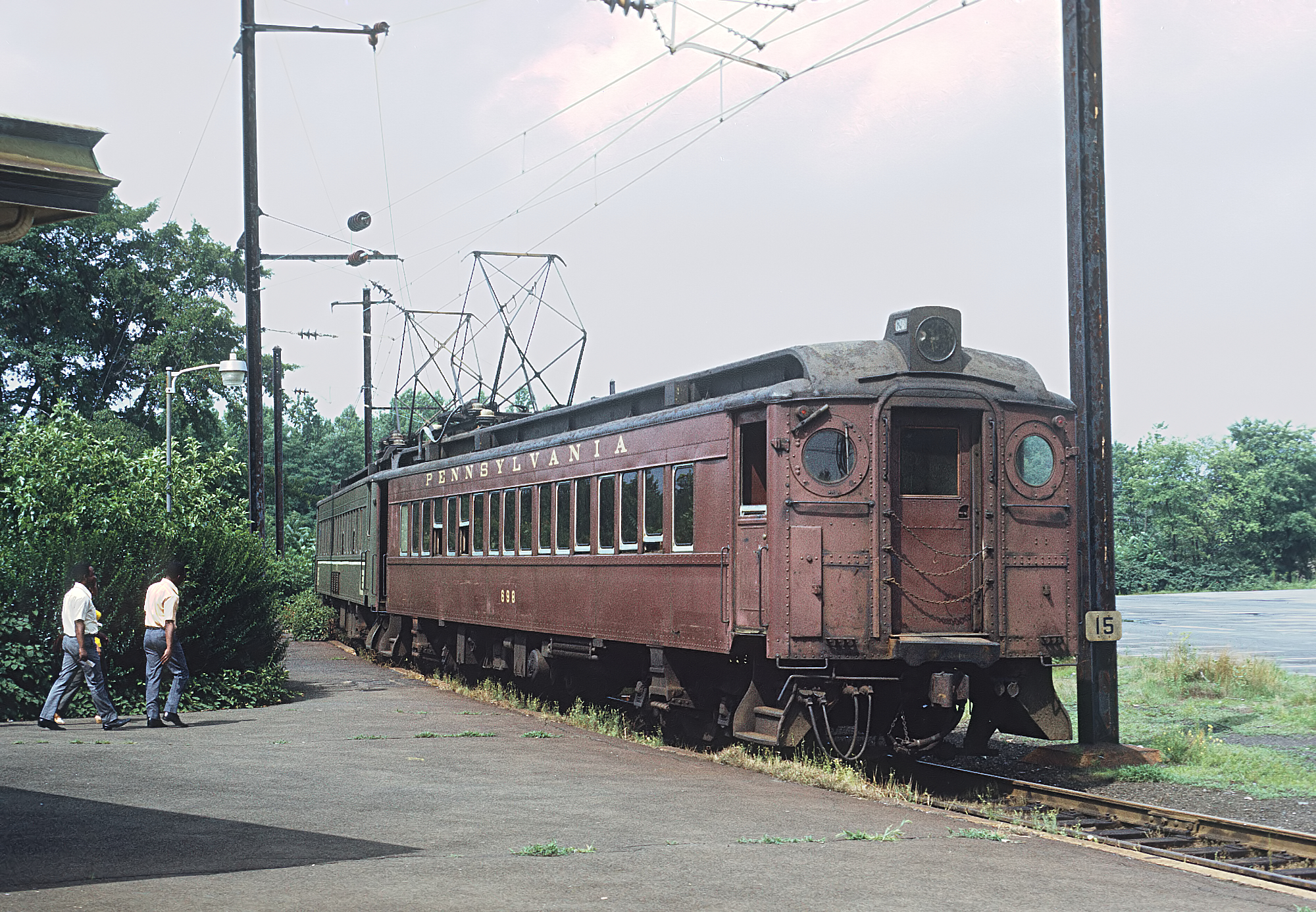
Princeton Branch "Dinky" in 1971

As of 2017, Princeton Junction was the 6th-busiest station in the NJ Transit rail system, with an average of 6,817 weekday boardings. In addition to the Northeast Corridor Line, NJT operates a 2.7-mile (4.3 km) spur line, the Princeton Branch, to Princeton station located at the Princeton University campus in Princeton. The shuttle is colloquially known as the "Dinky", and has also been known as the "PJ&B" (for "Princeton Junction and Back"). Two train cars, or sometimes just one, are used. A single switch connects the branch to the Northeast Corridor tracks north of the station.

Service on the Princeton Branch was suspended from October 14, 2018, through May 11, 2019, replaced by shuttle buses, as part of NJT's systemwide service reductions during the installation and testing of positive train control.

Amtrak provides two early-morning trains to Washington, D.C., and two evening returns, as well as one morning train to Harrisburg, Pennsylvania and one evening return, all of which stop at Philadelphia. Many more Amtrak trains stop at the nearby Trenton Transit Center. Until 2007, all Amtrak Pennsylvanian trains stopped at Princeton Junction. The southbound Amtrak Palmetto began stopping in Princeton Junction on weekdays in October 2015.

=== Transit village ===
Princeton Junction has been designated the core of the West Windsor transit village, a smart growth initiative to promote transit-oriented development which can include government incentives to encourage compact, higher density, mixed-use development within walking distance of the station. Development adjacent to the station permits higher densities and will include retail end entertainment elements.

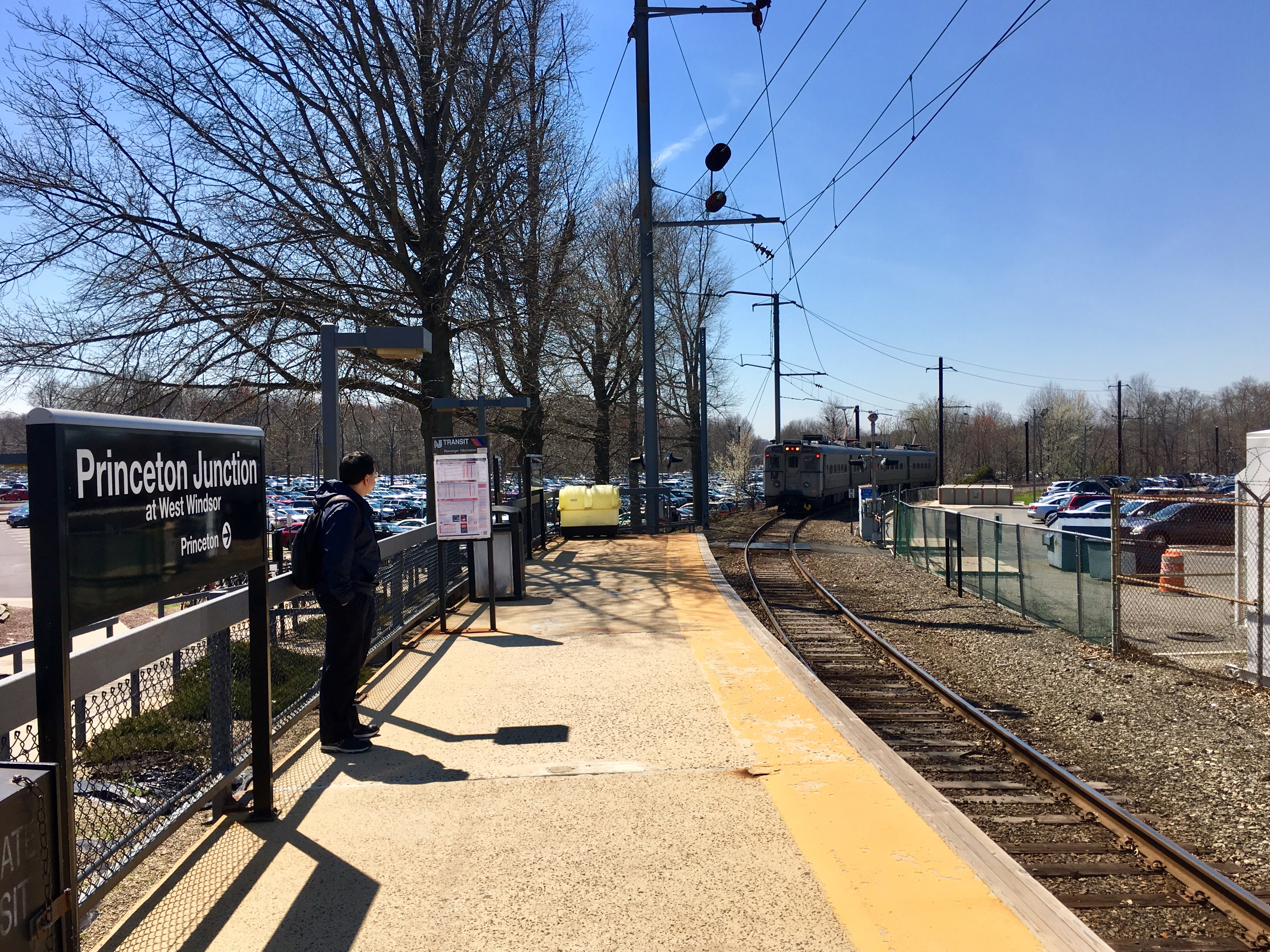
The platform for the "Dinky"
