= National Register of Historic Places listings in Mercer County, New Jersey =

Location of Mercer County in New Jersey

List of the National Register of Historic Places listings in Mercer County, New Jersey

Contents: Counties and communities in New Jersey
Atlantic – Bergen (Closter, Franklin Lakes, Ridgewood, Saddle River, Wyckoff) – Burlington – Camden – Cape May – Cumberland – Essex – Gloucester – Hudson – Hunterdon – Mercer – Middlesex – Monmouth – Morris – Ocean – Passaic – Salem – Somerset – Sussex – Union – Warren

This is intended to be a complete list of properties and districts listed on the National Register of Historic Places in Mercer County, New Jersey. Latitude and longitude coordinates of the sites listed on this page may be displayed in an online map.

This National Park Service list is complete through NPS recent listings posted August 21, 2026.

== Current listings ==
	Name on the Register	Image	Date listed	Location	City or town	Description
1	Abbott Farm Archeological Site	Abbott Farm Archeological Site	December 8, 1976 (#76001158)	John A. Roebling Park, other nearby public and private lands 40°11′10″N 74°43′37″W	Hamilton and Bordentown Townships, Bordentown	Paleoindian settlement, 500 BC-500 AD. Extends into Burlington County.
2	John Abbott II House	John Abbott II House	June 18, 1976 (#76001159)	2200 Kuser Rd. 40°12′14″N 74°40′51″W	Hamilton Township	Used to hide state treasury during American Revolution
3	Abbott-Decou House	Abbott-Decou House	July 1, 1976 (#76001160)	58 Soloff Dr. 40°11′08″N 74°43′11″W	Hamilton Township	Fine example of 18th century Quaker Georgian architecture.
4	Adams and Sickles Building	Adams and Sickles Building	January 31, 1980 (#80002498)	1 W. End Ave. 40°13′36″N 74°46′45″W	Trenton	Focal point for West End neighborhood, remembered for soda fountain and corner druggist.
5	American Cigar Company Building	American Cigar Company Building	December 30, 2011 (#11000965)	176 Division St. 40°12′45″N 74°44′41″W	Trenton	Built in 1903 as part of Trenton's vibrant cigar industry
6	Anderson-Capner House	Anderson-Capner House	April 3, 1973 (#73001107)	700 Trumbull Ave. 40°14′52″N 74°44′06″W	Lawrence	Pre-revolutionary farmhouse built 1764
7	Archeological Site No. 1-18th Century Vessel (28ME196)	Archeological Site No. 1-18th Century Vessel (28ME196)	August 14, 1986 (#86001508)	Address restricted	Trenton	
8	Baker-Brearley House	Baker-Brearley House	August 31, 1979 (#79001499)	East of Lawrenceville on Meadow Rd; 40°17′33″N 74°42′03″W	Lawrenceville	Georgian house built 1761
9	Bear Tavern Road--Jacob's Creek Crossing Rural Historic District	Bear Tavern Road--Jacob's Creek Crossing Rural Historic District	November 30, 2011 (#11000872)	Bear Tavern Rd. & Jacobs Creek Rd. 40°17′21″N 74°50′29″W	Hopewell Township, Ewing Township	Colonial rural landscape, route of Continental Army in 1776
10	Bellevue Avenue Colored School	Bellevue Avenue Colored School	January 2, 1997 (#96001547)	81 Bellevue Ave. 40°13′32″N 74°46′17″W	Trenton	
11	Berkeley Square Historic District	Berkeley Square Historic District	November 20, 1980 (#80002499)	Roughly bounded by W. State St., Parkside, Riverside, and Overbrook Aves. 40°13′49″N 74°47′23″W	Trenton	
12	Bow Hill	Bow Hill	January 25, 1973 (#73001111)	477 Jeremiah Ave. off Lalor St. 40°11′32″N 74°44′39″W	Hamilton Township	
13	Charles Brearley House	Charles Brearley House	April 14, 1995 (#95000407)	73 N. Clinton Ave. 40°13′23″N 74°45′18″W	Trenton	
14	Broad Street National Bank	Broad Street National Bank	January 17, 2008 (#07001404)	143 E. State Street; 40°13′12″N 74°45′43″W	Trenton	
15	Camden and Amboy Railroad Right of Way Site	Camden and Amboy Railroad Right of Way Site	June 16, 2016 (#16000252)	N. side of Rogers Ave. about 100 yds. W. of Mercer St. 40°16′09″N 74°31′31″W	Hightstown	
16	Carver Center	Carver Center	July 7, 2022 (#100007871)	40 Fowler Street; 40°13′29″N 74°46′07″W	Trenton	Known as Sunlight Elks Lodge
17	Henry Clay and Bock & Co. Ltd. Cigar Factory	Henry Clay and Bock & Co. Ltd. Cigar Factory	June 12, 1979 (#79001500)	507 Grand St. 40°12′11″N 74°44′45″W	Trenton	Most architecturally distinctive industrial building in Trenton
18	Grover Cleveland Home	Grover Cleveland Home	October 15, 1966 (#66000463)	15 Hodge Road; 40°21′05″N 74°40′04″W	Princeton	Known as Westland Mansion
19	Crosswicks Creek Site III	Crosswicks Creek Site III	November 26, 1990 (#87001795)	Address restricted	Hamilton Township	Extends into Burlington County
20	Delaware and Raritan Canal	Delaware and Raritan Canal	May 11, 1973 (#73001105)	Follows the Delaware River to Trenton, then E to New Brunswick; 40°19′55″N 74°39′09″W	Princeton	
21	Gen. Philemon Dickinson House	Gen. Philemon Dickinson House	May 17, 1974 (#74001172)	46 Colonial Ave. 40°13′36″N 74°47′01″W	Trenton	
22	Douglass House	Douglass House	December 18, 1970 (#70000387)	Corner of Front and Montgomery Streets; 40°13′08″N 74°45′42″W	Trenton	George Washington's headquarters prior to the Battle of Princeton
23	Downtown Trenton Commercial Historic District	Downtown Trenton Commercial Historic District	March 10, 2025 (#100011495)	W. and E. State Street, N. and S. Broad Street, E. Hanover Street, S. Montgomery Street and S. Warren Street; 40°13′12″N 74°45′51″W	Trenton	Includes Broad Street National Bank, First Presbyterian Church, Golden Swan–True American, and New Jersey Division of Motor Vehicles Building
24	Drake Farmstead–Brookdale Farm	Drake Farmstead–Brookdale Farm	September 16, 2024 (#100010797)	31 Titus Mill Road, near Pennington; 40°21′04″N 74°46′12″W	Hopewell Township	Includes Andrew and Hannah Drake Farmhouse, once the home of Muriel Gardiner Buttinger
25	Drumthwacket	Drumthwacket	June 10, 1975 (#75001142)	344 Stockton Rd. 40°20′22″N 74°40′29″W	Princeton	Official residence of the governor of New Jersey
26	East Trenton Public Library	East Trenton Public Library	March 5, 2008 (#08000134)	701 N. Clinton Ave. 40°14′00″N 74°44′30″W	Trenton	
27	Albert Einstein House	Albert Einstein House	January 7, 1976 (#76002297)	112 Mercer St. 40°20′40″N 74°39′59″W	Princeton	
28	First Presbyterian Church	First Presbyterian Church	September 9, 2005 (#05000967)	120 East State Street; 40°13′13″N 74°45′48″W	Trenton	Includes churchyard cemetery
29	First Presbyterian Church of Pennington	First Presbyterian Church of Pennington	August 24, 2011 (#11000591)	13 S. Main St. 40°19′39″N 74°47′25″W	Pennington	
30	Golden Swan–True American	Golden Swan–True American	April 30, 2008 (#08000361)	101-107 S. Warren Street; 40°13′09″N 74°45′59″W	Trenton	
31	William Green House	William Green House	December 4, 1973 (#73001106)	Metzger Drive; 40°15′54″N 74°46′39″W	Ewing Township	Historic farmhouse, dating to 1717. On Preservation New Jersey's list of 10 most endangered historic sites
32	Green-Reading House	Green-Reading House	March 12, 1998 (#98000237)	107 Wilburtha Rd. 40°15′38″N 74°49′32″W	Ewing Township	Federal style farmhouse from ca. 1797
33	Harbourton Historic District	Harbourton Historic District	December 31, 1974 (#74001167)	Junction of Harbourton/Rocktown and Harbourton/Mt. Airy Roads; 40°21′08″N 74°51′12″W	Harbourton	
34	John D. Hart House	John D. Hart House	October 18, 1972 (#72000800)	54 East Curlis Avenue, Pennington; 40°19′18″N 74°46′59″W	Hopewell Township	Built c. 1800, fine example of a clapboard house
35	Hart-Hoch House	Hart-Hoch House	March 14, 1973 (#73001109)	Southwest of Pennington on CR 546 and Scotch Rd. 40°18′34″N 74°48′43″W	Hopewell Township	Federal style home, ca. 1800
36	Joseph Henry House	Joseph Henry House	October 15, 1966 (#66000464)	Princeton University campus 40°20′58″N 74°39′32″W	Princeton	
37	Donald Grant Herring Estate	Donald Grant Herring Estate	January 17, 1992 (#91001927)	52, 72 and 75 Arreton Rd., Princeton; 40°22′56″N 74°39′57″W	Princeton	
38	Higbee Street School	Higbee Street School	April 14, 1995 (#95000409)	20 Bellevue Ave. 40°14′04″N 74°45′57″W	Trenton	
39	Highfields	Highfields	September 23, 1994 (#94001096)	End of Lindbergh Rd., East Amwell Township; 40°25′26″N 74°46′04″W	Hopewell Township	Home of Charles and Anne Lindbergh. Site of the Lindbergh kidnapping. Extends into Hunterdon County
40	Hog Island Cranes	Hog Island Cranes	June 17, 1980 (#80002500)	Trenton Marine Terminal; 40°11′27″N 74°45′22″W	Trenton	
41	Hopewell Station	Hopewell Station	June 22, 1984 (#84002728)	Railroad Place; 40°23′29″N 74°45′48″W	Hopewell	part of the Operating Passenger Railroad Stations TR
42	House at 379 West State Street	House at 379 West State Street	January 23, 1980 (#80002501)	379 W. State St. 40°13′29″N 74°46′41″W	Trenton	Queen Anne revival house
43	Hunt Farmstead	Hunt Farmstead	October 28, 1988 (#87002555)	197 Blackwell Rd. 40°19′18″N 74°45′39″W	Hopewell Township	
44	In and Out Social Club	In and Out Social Club	March 26, 1987 (#87000513)	714-716 S. Clinton Ave. 40°12′34″N 74°45′06″W	Trenton	Built in 1893 for "social, intellectual, and recreative purposes."
45	Jugtown Historic District	Jugtown Historic District	January 22, 1987 (#86003670)	Nassau and Harrison Sts., Harrison St. N, and Evelyn Pl. 40°21′14″N 74°38′49″W	Princeton	
46	King's Highway Historic District	King's Highway Historic District	December 21, 2000 (#00001493)	NJ 27, US 206; 40°20′54″N 74°39′52″W	Lawrenceville, Princeton	Extends into Middlesex and Somerset Counties
47	Kingston Mill Historic District	Kingston Mill Historic District	April 10, 1986 (#86000707)	Roughly bounded by Herrontown, River, Princeton-Kingston Roads; 40°22′25″N 74°37′14″W	Princeton	Extends into Middlesex and Somerset Counties, includes Kingston Bridge
48	Rudolph V. Kuser Estate	Rudolph V. Kuser Estate	August 24, 1979 (#79001501)	315 W. State St. 40°13′23″N 74°46′36″W	Trenton	
49	Lake Carnegie Historic District	Lake Carnegie Historic District	June 28, 1990 (#90001000)	Roughly bounded by Lake Carnegie shoreline from Conrail bridge at west end to dam west of Kingston at east end 40°20′51″N 74°38′12″W	Princeton	
50	Lawrence Township Historic District	Lawrence Township Historic District	September 14, 1972 (#72000799)	Lawrenceville and vicinity N, including both sides of U.S. 206; 40°18′01″N 74°43′12″W	Lawrence Township	Includes Lawrenceville School
51	Lawrenceville School	Lawrenceville School	February 24, 1986 (#86000158)	Main St. 40°17′45″N 74°43′49″W	Lawrenceville	
52	Ichabod Leigh House	Ichabod Leigh House	March 4, 1975 (#75001139)	953 Cherry Valley Road; 40°22′21″N 74°43′55″W	Hopewell Township	
53	Thomas Maddock's Sons Company	Thomas Maddock's Sons Company	March 14, 2008 (#08000178)	American Metro Boulevard; 40°15′27″N 74°42′17″W	Hamilton Township	Sanitary pottery manufacturing plant built 1924-25
54	Mansion House	Mansion House	February 6, 1973 (#73001112)	Cadwalader Park; 40°14′12″N 74°47′22″W	Trenton	Also known as Ellarslie and the McCall House, home to the Trenton City Museum
55	Maybury Hill	Maybury Hill	November 11, 1971 (#71000502)	346 Snowden Lane; 40°22′02″N 74°38′34″W	Princeton	
56	Mercer Street Friends Center	Mercer Street Friends Center	August 12, 1971 (#71000505)	151 Mercer St. 40°13′02″N 74°45′40″W	Trenton	
57	Mill Hill Historic District	Mill Hill Historic District	December 12, 1977 (#77000880)	Roughly bounded by Clay, Jackson, Front, Market, Broad, and Greenwood Streets; 40°13′01″N 74°45′40″W	Trenton	Includes Douglass House and Mercer Street Friends Center
58	Morven	Morven	January 25, 1971 (#71000503)	55 Stockton St. 40°20′51″N 74°40′01″W	Princeton	
59	Mott School and Second Street School	Mott School and Second Street School	April 15, 1986 (#86000809)	Centre and 643-645 Second Sts. 40°12′07″N 74°45′24″W	Trenton	
60	Mount Rose Distillery	Mount Rose Distillery	December 12, 1996 (#96001471)	Address restricted 40°22′02″N 74°44′49″W	Hopewell Township	
61	Mountain Avenue Historic District	Mountain Avenue Historic District	February 2, 1995 (#94001604)	73-143 Mountain Ave. 40°21′25″N 74°40′25″W	Princeton	
62	Nassau Hall, Princeton University	Nassau Hall, Princeton University	October 15, 1966 (#66000465)	Princeton University campus 40°20′55″N 74°39′34″W	Princeton	
63	New Jersey Division of Motor Vehicles Building	New Jersey Division of Motor Vehicles Building	March 20, 2023 (#100008729)	25 South Montgomery Street; 40°13′10″N 74°45′43″W	Trenton	
64	Old Barracks	Old Barracks	January 25, 1971 (#71000506)	S. Willow St. 40°13′10″N 74°46′07″W	Trenton	
65	Old Eagle Tavern	Old Eagle Tavern	November 3, 1972 (#72000801)	431, 433 S. Broad St. 40°12′47″N 74°45′34″W	Trenton	
66	Old Ryan Farm	Old Ryan Farm	September 10, 1971 (#71000507)	27 Federal City Road; 40°16′47″N 74°46′15″W	Ewing Township	Known as the Benjamin Temple House
67	Old School Baptist Church and Cemetery of Hopewell	Old School Baptist Church and Cemetery of Hopewell	November 25, 2024 (#100011029)	46 West Broad Street; 40°23′18″N 74°45′53″W	Hopewell	
68	Isaac Pearson House	Isaac Pearson House	February 1, 2006 (#05001568)	Hobson Ave. at Emiline Ave. 40°11′16″N 74°42′44″W	Hamilton Township	
69	Pennington Railroad Station	Pennington Railroad Station	December 31, 1974 (#74001170)	Corner of Franklin and Green Ave. 40°19′58″N 74°47′41″W	Pennington	
70	Penns Neck Baptist Church	Penns Neck Baptist Church	December 28, 1989 (#89002160)	US 1 at Princeton-Hightstown Road; 40°19′55″N 74°38′15″W	Penns Neck	
71	Pennsylvania Railroad Bridge	Pennsylvania Railroad Bridge	June 6, 1979 (#79001502)	Spans Delaware River; 40°12′24″N 74°46′09″W	Trenton	
72	Philadelphia and Reading Railroad Freight Station	Philadelphia and Reading Railroad Freight Station	May 14, 1979 (#79001503)	260 N. Willow St. 40°13′34″N 74°46′03″W	Trenton	
73	Joseph Phillips Farm	Joseph Phillips Farm	May 2, 1977 (#77000879)	North of Titusville on Hunter Road; 40°20′23″N 74°53′56″W	Hopewell Township	Started by Joseph Phillips in 1732, now the Howell Living History Farm, which operates and preserves it as it was in 1900
74	Pleasant Valley Historic District	Pleasant Valley Historic District	June 14, 1991 (#91000676)	Centered on junction of Pleasant Valley Road with Woodens Lane and Hunter Road; 40°20′18″N 74°53′44″W	Hopewell Township	Extends into Hunterdon County, includes Joseph Phillips Farm
75	President's House	President's House	July 17, 1971 (#71000504)	Nassau St. 40°20′56″N 74°39′36″W	Princeton	
76	Princeton Battlefield	Princeton Battlefield	October 15, 1966 (#66000466)	Princeton Battlefield State Park; also Roughly Quaker Rd. from Stockton Rd. to Stony Brook; 40°19′45″N 74°40′36″W	Princeton	Boundary increases approved October 10, 1989 and April 26, 2019
77	Princeton Historic District	Princeton Historic District	June 27, 1975 (#75001143)	Irregular pattern between Lytle St. and Haslet Ave. from Lovers Lane to Olden Sts. 40°20′48″N 74°39′51″W	Princeton	
78	Princeton Ice Company	Princeton Ice Company	August 28, 2007 (#07000874)	57 Mountain Ave. 40°21′26″N 74°40′17″W	Princeton	
79	Prospect	Prospect	February 4, 1985 (#85002434)	Princeton University campus 40°20′49″N 74°39′24″W	Princeton	
80	Riverview Cemetery	Riverview Cemetery	March 27, 2017 (#100000810)	870 Centre Street; 40°11′42″N 74°45′12″W	Trenton	
81	Roebling Machine Shop	Roebling Machine Shop	September 4, 1997 (#97000932)	675 S. Clinton Ave. 40°12′35″N 74°45′11″W	Trenton	Oldest surviving building in the Roebling complex, built innovative wire rope making machines
82	John A. Roebling's Sons Company, Trenton N.J., Block 3	John A. Roebling's Sons Company, Trenton N.J., Block 3	August 22, 2012 (#12000528)	Bounded by Hamilton Ave., Clark, Elmer, & E. Canal Sts. 40°12′46″N 74°45′19″W	Trenton	Northern portion of Roebling complex, built wire for North Sea Mine Barrage, Golden Gate Bridge, among other structures
83	John Rogers House	John Rogers House	January 31, 1978 (#78001770)	South of Princeton on S. Post Rd. 40°15′45″N 74°38′52″W	West Windsor	
84	V. Henry Rothschild-F.A. Straus and Co.-Atlantic Products Corporation Mill Complex	V. Henry Rothschild-F.A. Straus and Co.-Atlantic Products Corporation Mill Complex	November 19, 2020 (#100005815)	1 North Johnston Ave. 40°13′58″N 74°44′00″W	Hamilton Township	
85	Sacred Heart Church	Sacred Heart Church	May 2, 2002 (#02000434)	343 S. Broad St. 40°12′59″N 74°45′40″W	Trenton	
86	Samuel Sloan House	Samuel Sloan House	March 28, 1974 (#74001168)	238 S. Main St. 40°15′58″N 74°31′32″W	Hightstown	
87	Smith-Ribsam House	Smith-Ribsam House	June 9, 1988 (#88000722)	45 Pine Knoll Dr. 40°16′27″N 74°43′28″W	Eldridge Park	
88	Somerset Roller Mills	Somerset Roller Mills	November 19, 1974 (#74001171)	NJ 29; 40°16′45″N 74°51′13″W	Titusville	
89	St. Michael's Episcopal Church	St. Michael's Episcopal Church	April 29, 1982 (#82003280)	140 N. Warren St. 40°13′20″N 74°45′55″W	Trenton	
90	State House Historic District	State House Historic District	August 27, 1976 (#76001161)	Roughly bounded by Capitol Plaza, Willow, State and Lafayette Sts. • Boundary increase (listed April 2, 1992, refnum 92000295): W. State St. south side, west of New Jersey State House; 40°13′14″N 74°46′15″W	Trenton	
91	Israel Stevens House	Israel Stevens House	March 15, 2005 (#05000176)	2167 Brunswick Ave. 40°15′19″N 74°44′00″W	Lawrence	
92	Stockton Street Historic District	Stockton Street Historic District	November 25, 2005 (#05001331)	126-136 Stockton St., 219-237 Rogers Ave. 40°16′15″N 74°31′42″W	Hightstown	
93	Stokely-Van Camp Industrial Complex	Stokely-Van Camp Industrial Complex	March 11, 1983 (#83001603)	Lalor Street at Stokely Ave. 40°11′59″N 74°45′16″W	Trenton	
94	Joseph Stout House	Joseph Stout House	October 29, 1974 (#74001169)	Province Line Road; 40°24′34″N 74°44′44″W	Hopewell Township	
95	Titusville Historic District	Titusville Historic District	March 17, 1983 (#83001604)	River Drive; 40°18′22″N 74°52′44″W	Titusville	
96	William Trent House	William Trent House	April 15, 1970 (#70000388)	15 Market Street; 40°12′46″N 74°45′58″W	Trenton	
97	Trenton and Mercer County War Memorial-Soldiers' and Sailors' Memorial Building	Trenton and Mercer County War Memorial-Soldiers' and Sailors' Memorial Building	December 11, 1986 (#86003480)	W. Lafayette St. 40°13′06″N 74°46′06″W	Trenton	
98	Trenton Battle Monument	Trenton Battle Monument	May 6, 1977 (#77000881)	Warren and Broad Streets; 40°13′33″N 74°45′53″W	Trenton	Commemorates the Battle of Trenton
99	Trenton Central Office of the Bell Telephone Company	Trenton Central Office of the Bell Telephone Company	April 3, 2017 (#100000826)	214-218 E. State St. 40°13′14″N 74°45′40″W	Trenton	
100	Trenton City Hall	Trenton City Hall	January 30, 1978 (#78001771)	309 State St. 40°13′12″N 74°45′34″W	Trenton	
101	Trenton City/Calhoun Street Bridge	Trenton City/Calhoun Street Bridge	November 20, 1975 (#75001621)	Spans Delaware River between Morrisville, PA and Trenton, NJ; 40°13′11″N 74°46′42″W	Trenton	
102	Trenton Ferry Historic District	Trenton Ferry Historic District	June 26, 2013 (#13000355)	Roughly bounded by South Broad and Federal Streets, the Delaware River and the Amtrak Northeast Corridor; 40°12′36″N 74°45′34″W	Trenton	Working class urban mixed-use neighborhood of row houses, duplexes, churches, and commercial buildings
103	Trenton Friends Meeting House	Trenton Friends Meeting House	April 30, 2008 (#08000362)	142 E. Hanover St. 40°13′16″N 74°45′46″W	Trenton	
104	Trenton Jewish Community Center Bath House and Day Camp	Trenton Jewish Community Center Bath House and Day Camp	February 23, 1984 (#84002730)	999 Lower Ferry Rd. 40°15′33″N 74°47′58″W	Ewing Township	
105	Trenton Watch Company Building-Circle F Manufacturing Company Building	Trenton Watch Company Building-Circle F Manufacturing Company Building	April 3, 2017 (#100000827)	720 Monmouth St. 40°13′02″N 74°44′48″W	Trenton	
106	Tusculum	Tusculum	January 5, 1978 (#78003171)	North of Princeton on Cherry Hill Rd. 40°21′58″N 74°40′17″W	Princeton	
107	U.S. Post Office and Courthouse	U.S. Post Office and Courthouse	May 24, 2012 (#12000309)	402 E. State St. 40°13′16″N 74°45′26″W	Trenton	
108	University Cottage Club	University Cottage Club	November 19, 1999 (#99001315)	51 Prospect Ave. 40°20′53″N 74°39′07″W	Princeton	
109	Colonel John Van Cleve Homestead	Colonel John Van Cleve Homestead	February 16, 1983 (#83001605)	Northwest of Pennington on Poor Farm Road; 40°21′11″N 74°49′27″W	Hopewell Township	
110	Jeremiah Vandyke House	Jeremiah Vandyke House	March 29, 1978 (#78001769)	Featherbed Lane; 40°24′34″N 74°46′51″W	Hopewell Township	
111	Washington Crossing State Park	Washington Crossing State Park	October 15, 1966 (#66000650)	Titusville, New Jersey, on the Delaware River; 40°17′57″N 74°52′07″W	Titusville	
112	Washington Road Elm Allée	Washington Road Elm Allée	January 14, 1999 (#98001571)	Washington Rd., bet. the Penns Neck Circle and The D&R Canal; 40°20′08″N 74°38′37″W	West Windsor	
113	Isaac Watson House	Isaac Watson House	January 21, 1974 (#74001173)	151 Westcott Street; 40°11′26″N 74°43′38″W	Hamilton Township	
114	John Welling House	John Welling House	March 14, 1973 (#73001110)	Curlis Avenue at Birch Street; 40°19′17″N 74°46′58″W	Pennington	Rare example of a Dutch clapboard and shingle house
115	West Trenton Station	West Trenton Station	June 22, 1984 (#84004031)	Sullivan Way; 40°15′27″N 74°48′57″W	West Trenton	part of the Operating Passenger Railroad Stations TR
116	John White House	John White House	January 29, 1973 (#73001108)	Cold Soil Road, Lawrenceville; 40°18′52″N 74°43′42″W	Lawrence Township	
117	Windsor Historic District	Windsor Historic District	April 10, 1992 (#88001710)	Roughly bounded by properties along Main St. and Church St. 40°14′27″N 74°35′06″W	Robbinsville	
118	Witherspoon Street School for Colored Children	Witherspoon Street School for Colored Children	March 9, 2005 (#05000125)	35 Quarry St. 40°21′19″N 74°39′46″W	Princeton	
119	Jeremiah Woolsey House	Jeremiah Woolsey House	January 27, 1975 (#75001140)	Southwest of Pennington on Washington Crossing Road; 40°18′32″N 74°49′36″W	Hopewell Township	Dutch Colonial house built 1765. Jeremiah Woolsey served as a commissioner to recruit men to serve in the Continental Army during the American Revolution.

== Former listings ==
	Name on the Register	Image	Date listed	Date removed	Location	City or town	Description
1	Hutchinson House		January 25, 1973 (#73002201)	March 6, 1975	1 mi. NE of Hutchinson Mill-Pond Rd.	Hamilton Square	Destroyed by fire in 1974.
2	Princessville Inn	Princessville Inn	June 27, 1980 (#80002497)	June 11, 1982	E of Lawrenceville at 3510 Princeton Pike	Lawrence Township	Destroyed by fire on January 6, 1982. Adjacent cemetery is extant.

== See also ==
- National Register of Historic Places listings in New Jersey
- List of National Historic Landmarks in New Jersey
