= Colonel John Van Cleve Homestead =

- U.S. National Register of Historic Places
- New Jersey Register of Historic Places
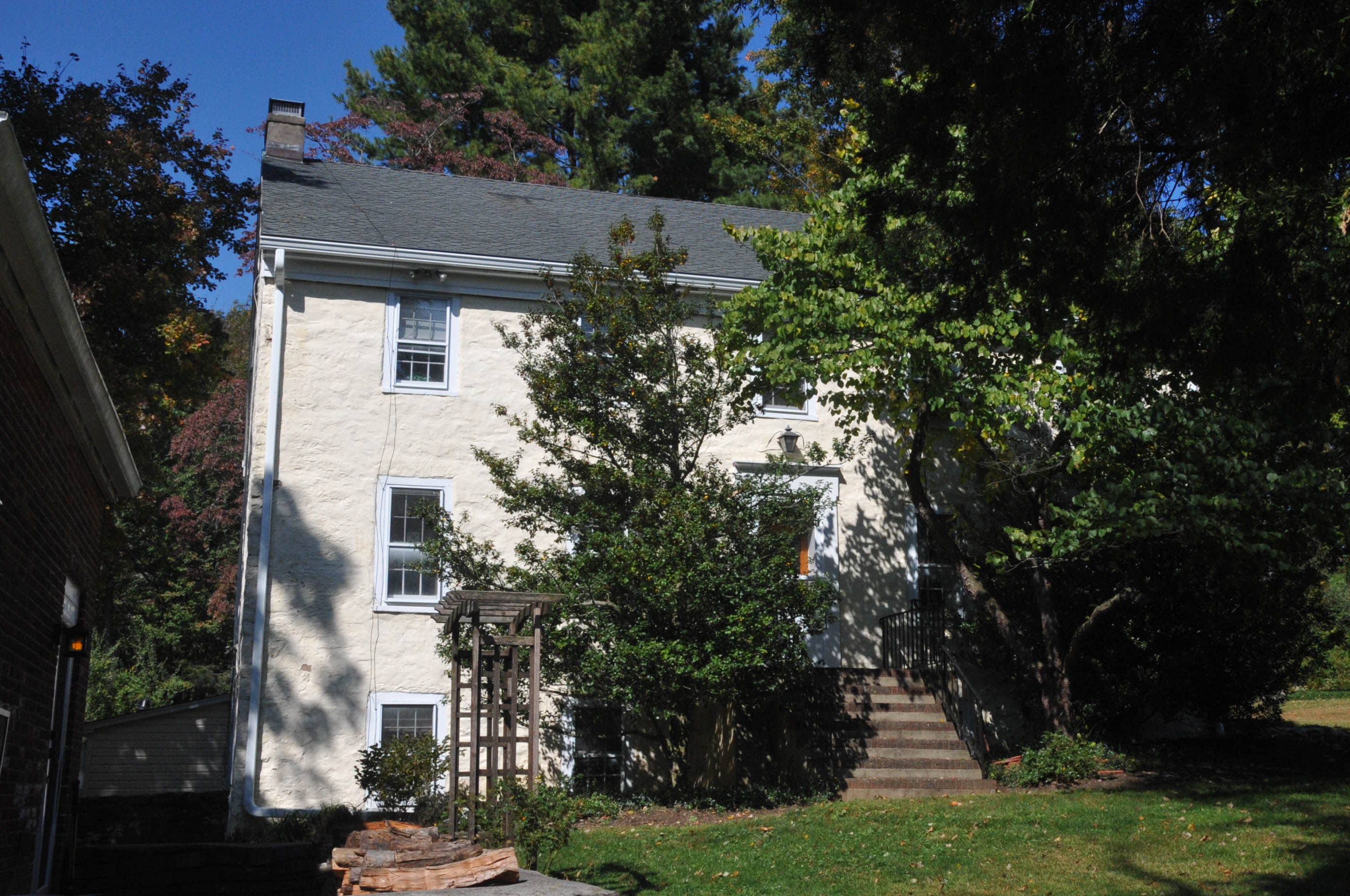
- Poor Farm Main House

- Location within Mercer County, New Jersey Location within New Jersey Location within the United States
- Location: 44–46 Poor Farm Road, Hopewell Township, New Jersey
- Nearest city: Pennington, New Jersey
- Coordinates: 40°21′11″N 74°49′27″W
- Area: 4.7 acres (1.9 ha)
- Built: 1843
- NRHP reference No.: 83001605
- NJRHP No.: 1704

Significant dates
- Added to NRHP: February 16, 1983
- Designated NJRHP: December 21, 1982

The Colonel John Van Cleve Homestead, also known as the Hopewell Township Poor Farm, features a historic stone house built in 1843 and located at 44–46 Poor Farm Road, northwest of Pennington, in Hopewell Township in Mercer County, New Jersey, United States. The 4.7-acre (1.9 ha) property was added to the National Register of Historic Places on February 16, 1983, for its significance in architecture and social history.

== History and description ==
The Hopewell Township Poor Farm was established in 1821 on the earlier farmstead. The two and one-half story Poor Farm Main House was built in 1843 using fieldstone. The Poor Farm, an almshouse, operated until 1951. Also contributing to the listing, the Old Van Cleve Farmhouse is a one and one-half fieldstone house, constructed in the mid 18th century. It was the home of Colonel John Van Cleve, an officer in the Hunterdon County Militia during the American Revolutionary War.

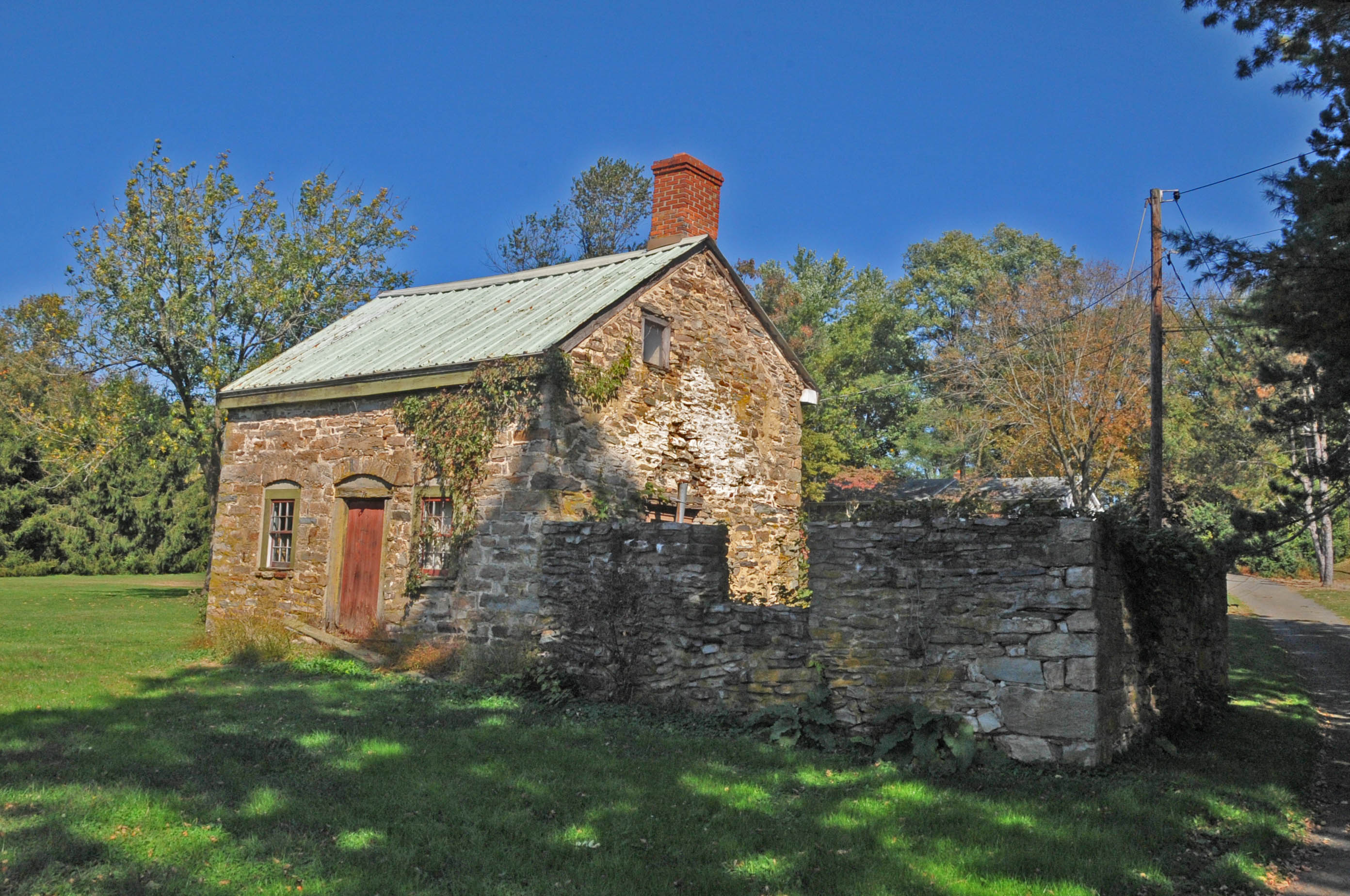
Old Van Cleve Farmhouse

== See also ==
- National Register of Historic Places listings in Mercer County, New Jersey
