= Adams and Sickles Building =

- U.S. National Register of Historic Places
- New Jersey Register of Historic Places
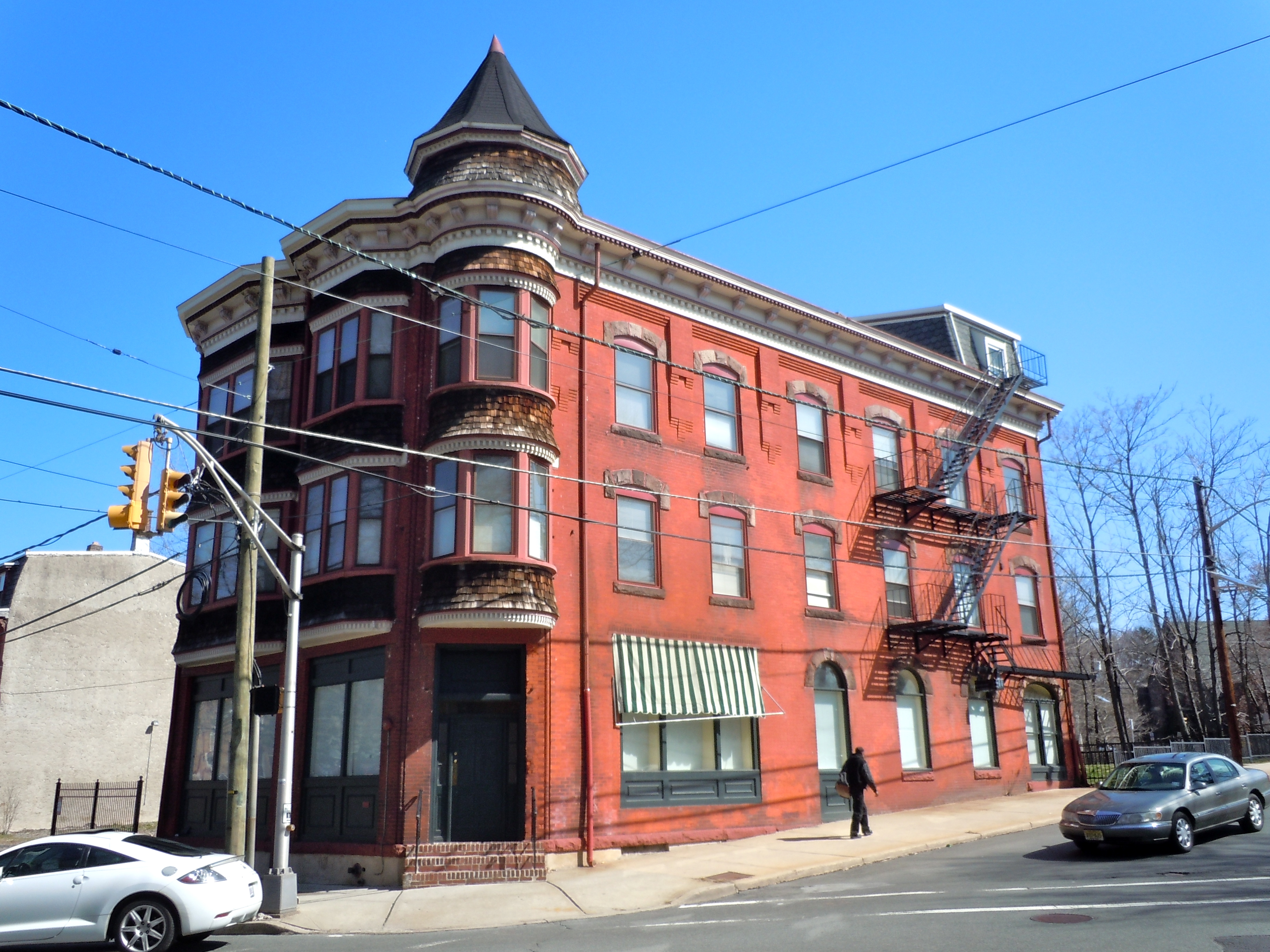

- Location within Mercer County, New Jersey Location within New Jersey Location within the United States
- Location: 1 West End Avenue, Trenton, New Jersey
- Coordinates: 40°13′36″N 74°46′45″W
- Area: 0.58 acres (0.23 ha)
- Built: 1900
- Architectural style: Queen Anne
- NRHP reference No.: 80002498
- NJRHP No.: 1757

Significant dates
- Added to NRHP: January 31, 1980
- Designated NJRHP: June 5, 1979

Adams and Sickles Building is located in Trenton, Mercer County, New Jersey, United States. The building was constructed in 1900 and added to the National Register of Historic Places on January 31, 1980. It was the focal point for the West End neighborhood, remembered for its soda fountain and corner druggist.

== See also ==
- National Register of Historic Places listings in Mercer County, New Jersey
