= John White House (Lawrenceville, New Jersey) =

- U.S. National Register of Historic Places
- New Jersey Register of Historic Places
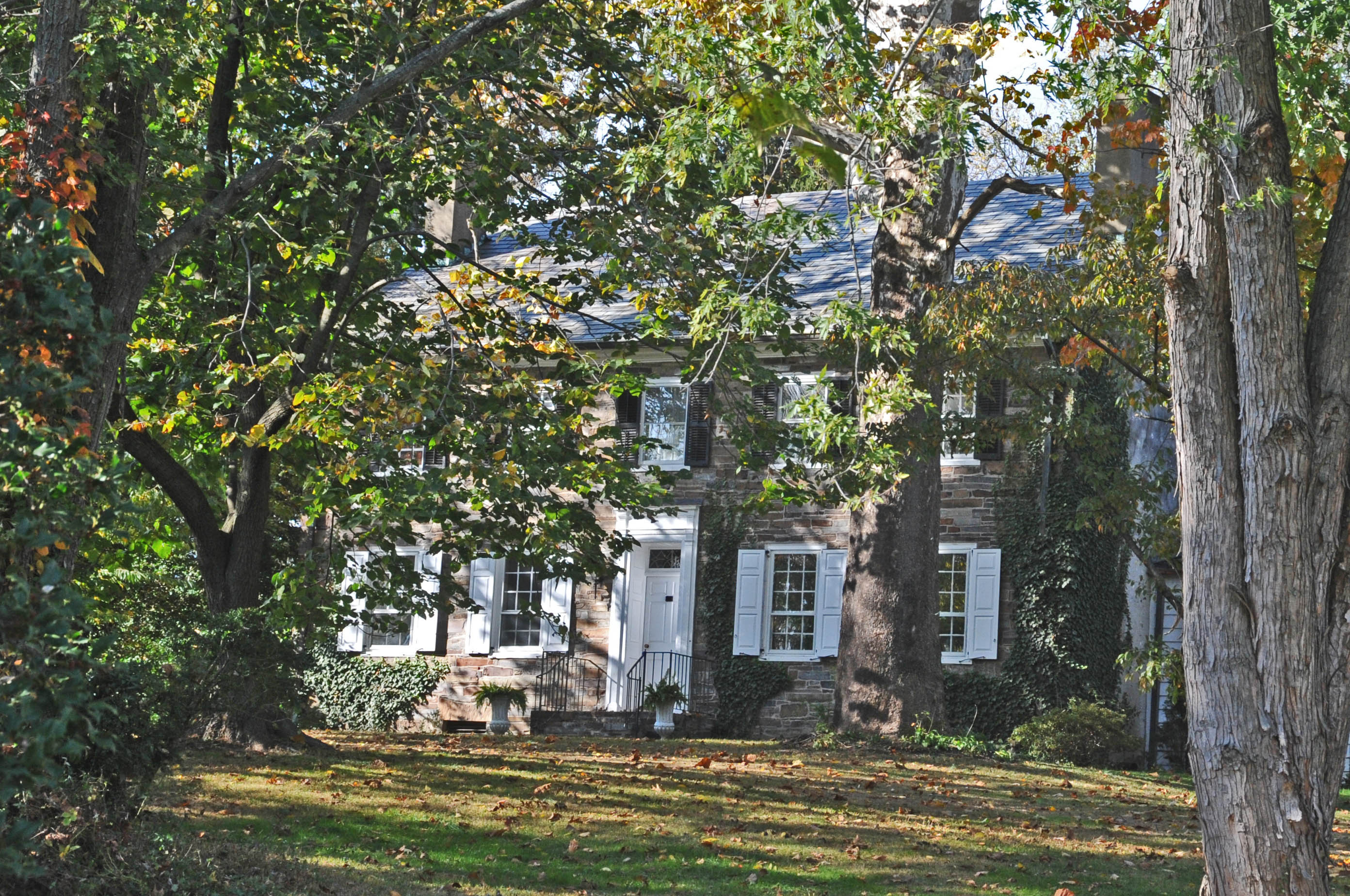

- Location within Mercer County, New Jersey Location within New Jersey Location within the United States
- Location: Cold Soil Road, Lawrenceville, New Jersey
- Coordinates: 40°18′52″N 74°43′42″W
- Area: 4.5 acres (1.8 ha)
- Built: c. 1800
- Architectural style: Federal
- NRHP reference No.: 73001108
- NJRHP No.: 1726

Significant dates
- Added to NRHP: January 29, 1973
- Designated NJRHP: May 1, 1972

The John White House is a historic stone house built around 1800 and located on Cold Soil Road north of the Lawrenceville section of Lawrence Township in Mercer County, New Jersey, United States. Featuring Federal architecture, the house was added to the National Register of Historic Places on January 29, 1973, for its significance in architecture. John White purchased a plot of 231 acres (93 ha) here in 1793. According to the nomination form, the house displays excellent workmanship and is in a well-preserved state.

== See also ==
- National Register of Historic Places listings in Mercer County, New Jersey
