= Charles Brearley House =

Historic house in New Jersey, United States

- U.S. National Register of Historic Places
- New Jersey Register of Historic Places
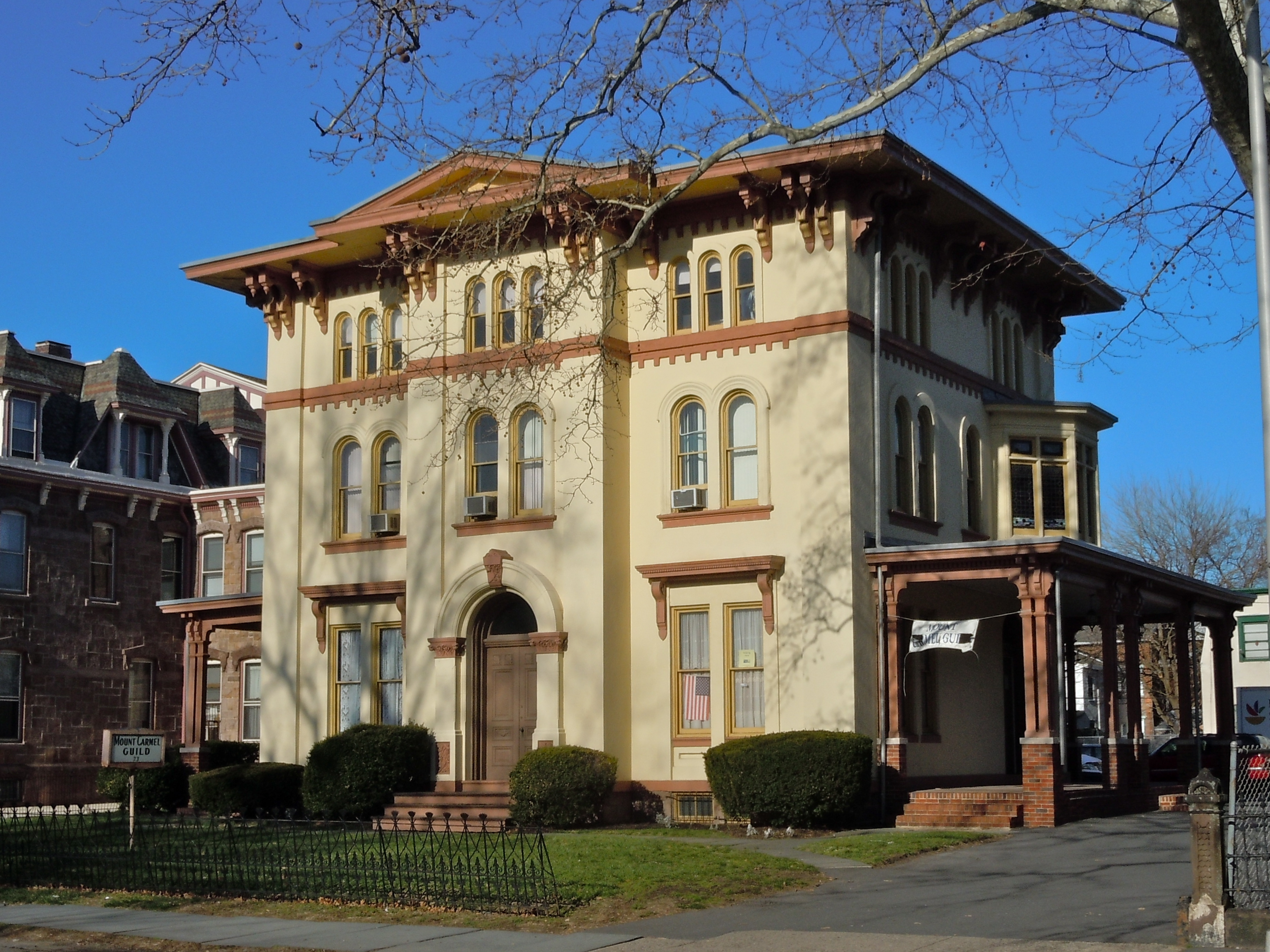

- Location within Mercer County, New Jersey Location within New Jersey Location within the United States
- Location: 73 North Clinton Avenue, Trenton, New Jersey
- Coordinates: 40°13′23″N 74°45′18″W
- Area: less than one acre
- Built: 1855
- Architectural style: Italianate
- NRHP reference No.: 95000407
- NJRHP No.: 2813

Significant dates
- Added to NRHP: April 14, 1995
- Designated NJRHP: March 3, 1995

Charles Brearley House is located in Trenton, Mercer County, New Jersey, United States. The building was built in 1855 and was added to the National Register of Historic Places on April 14, 1995.

== See also ==
- National Register of Historic Places listings in Mercer County, New Jersey
