= In and Out Social Club =

- U.S. National Register of Historic Places
- New Jersey Register of Historic Places
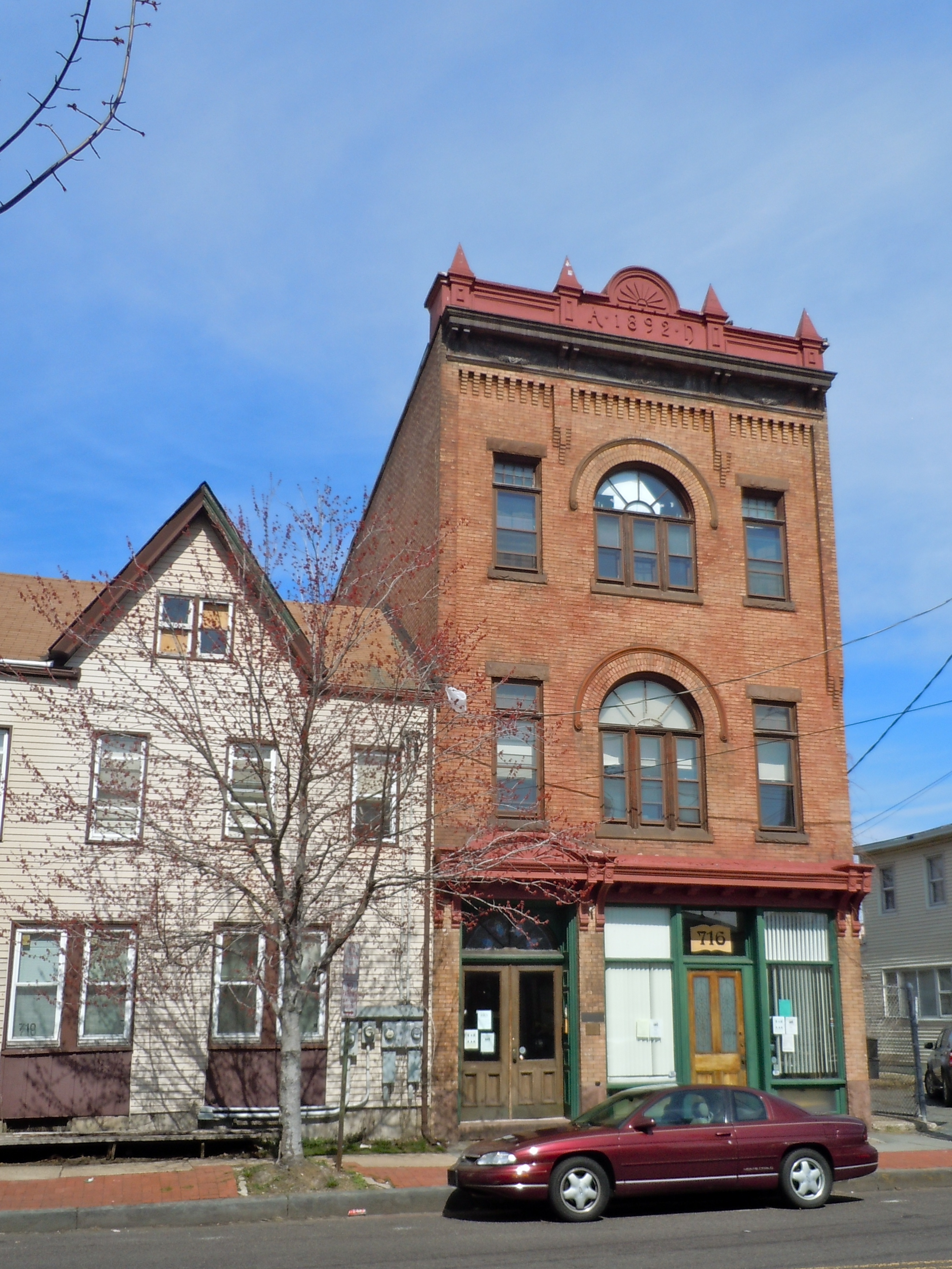

- Location within Mercer County, New Jersey Location within New Jersey Location within the United States
- Location: 714-716 South Clinton Avenue, Trenton, New Jersey
- Coordinates: 40°12′34″N 74°45′6″W
- Area: less than one acre
- Built: 1893
- Architect: Clayton, Steve
- Architectural style: Classical Revival, Romanesque
- NRHP reference No.: 87000513
- NJRHP No.: 1773

Significant dates
- Added to NRHP: March 26, 1987
- Designated NJRHP: February 20, 1987

In and Out Social Club is located in Trenton, Mercer County, New Jersey, United States. The building was built in 1893 and was added to the National Register of Historic Places on March 26, 1987. It was founded on September 2, 1889 for "social, intellectual, and recreative purposes." Its significance lies primarily in that the building was designed and built specifically for a social club based in the community. It largely retains its original appearance.

== See also ==
- National Register of Historic Places listings in Mercer County, New Jersey
