= Green–Reading House =

- U.S. National Register of Historic Places
- New Jersey Register of Historic Places
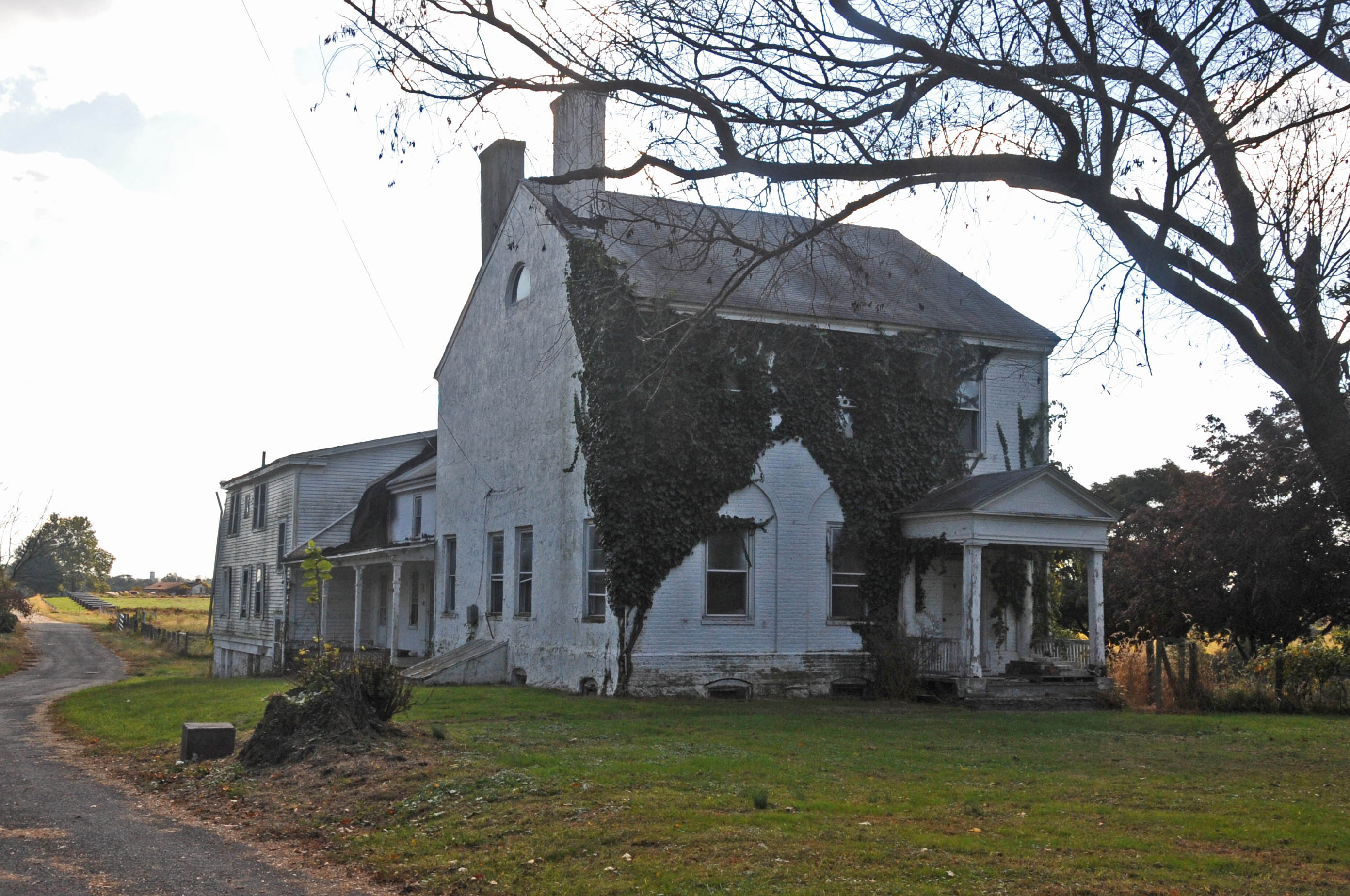

- Location within Mercer County, New Jersey Location within New Jersey Location within the United States
- Location: 107 Wilburtha Road, Ewing Township, New Jersey
- Coordinates: 40°15′36.8″N 74°49′31.5″W
- Area: 2.5 acres (1.0 ha)
- Built: ca. 1797
- Architectural style: Federal
- NRHP reference No.: 98000237
- NJRHP No.: 86

Significant dates
- Added to NRHP: March 12, 1998
- Designated NJRHP: January 28, 1998

The Green–Reading House is a historic late 18th-century Federal style farmhouse in Ewing Township, New Jersey. The Green family was notable for running the Delaware River Ferry, which crossed the river at the foot of Wilburtha Road. The house later came into the Reading family by marriage. It came into the possession of the State of New Jersey in 1911.

== See also ==
- National Register of Historic Places listings in Mercer County, New Jersey
