= Bellevue Avenue Colored School =

- U.S. National Register of Historic Places
- New Jersey Register of Historic Places
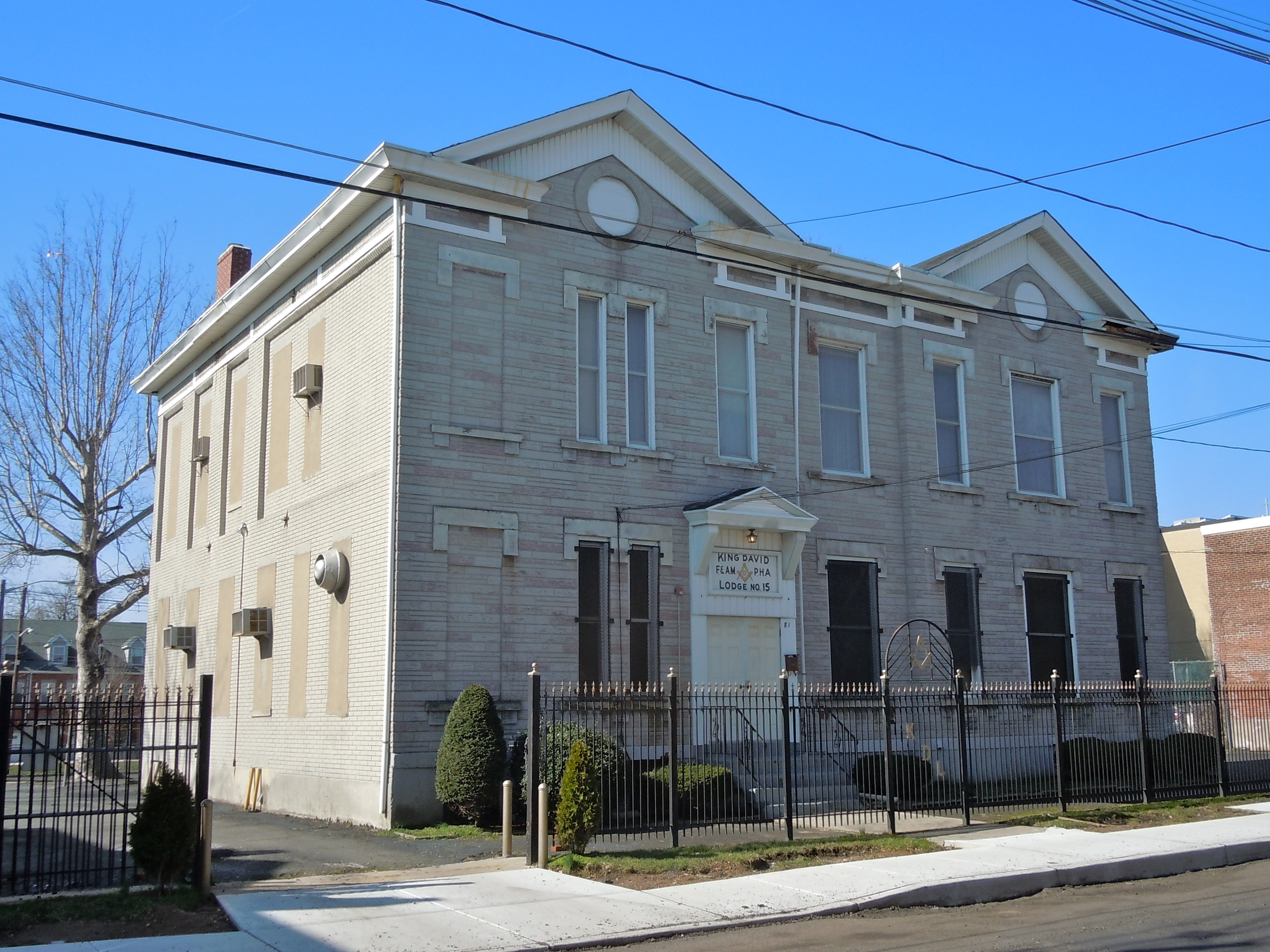

- Location within Mercer County, New Jersey Location within New Jersey Location within the United States
- Location: 81 Bellevue Avenue, Trenton, New Jersey
- Coordinates: 40°13′32″N 74°46′17″W
- Built: 1883
- Built by: Alfred P. Herron
- Architect: William B. Thines
- Architectural style: Italianate
- NRHP reference No.: 96001547
- NJRHP No.: 3266

Significant dates
- Added to NRHP: January 2, 1997
- Designated NJRHP: April 26, 1996

The Bellevue Avenue Colored School is located at 81 Bellevue Avenue in the city of Trenton in Mercer County, New Jersey, United States. The building was built in 1883 and added to the National Register of Historic Places on January 2, 1997, for its significance in education and Black history. It is now used as a Masonic lodge by King David Lodge No. 15 Free & Accepted Masons.

The two-story brick Italianate building was designed by Trenton architect William B. Thines and constructed by Alfred P. Herron. It was built as a "new school building for the use of the colored children of Trenton". It has also been known as the Lincoln School, Old Lincoln School, Public School No. 14, and King David Lodge No. 15 F & AM.

== See also ==
- National Register of Historic Places listings in Mercer County, New Jersey
- List of Masonic buildings in the United States
