= Mountain Avenue Historic District =

Historic district in New Jersey, United States

- U.S. National Register of Historic Places
- U.S. Historic district
- New Jersey Register of Historic Places
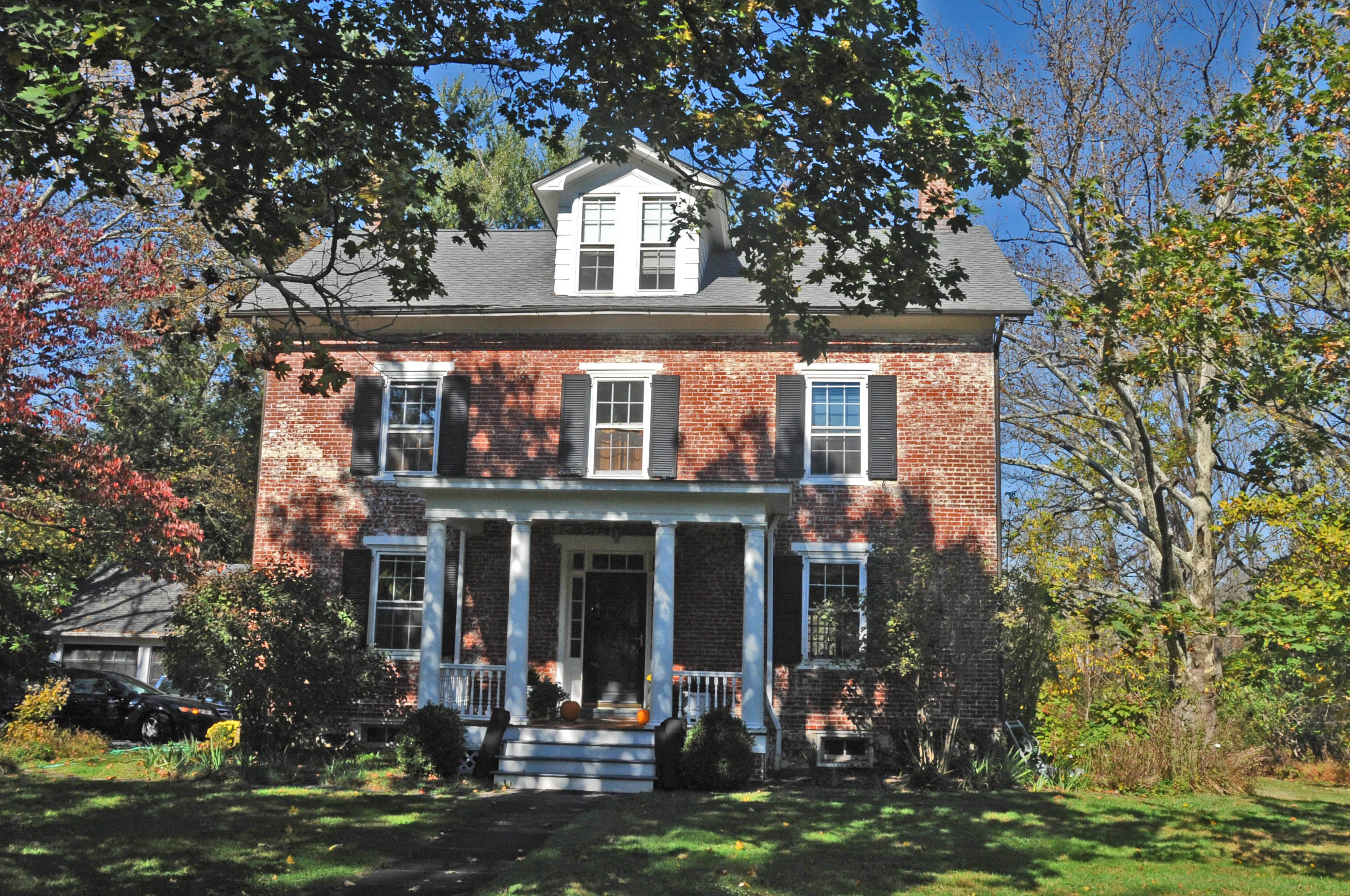
- The oldest house in the district, 73 Mountain Avenue, built 1840

- Location within Mercer County, New Jersey Location within New Jersey Location within the United States
- Location: 73-143 Mountain Avenue, Princeton, New Jersey
- Coordinates: 40°21′26.1″N 74°40′19.5″W
- Area: 9 acres (3.6 ha)
- Built: 1840-1940
- Architect: Multiple
- Architectural style: Queen Anne, American Foursquare, Victorian
- NRHP reference No.: 94001604
- NJRHP No.: 1750

Significant dates
- Added to NRHP: February 2, 1995
- Designated NJRHP: December 9, 1994

The Mountain Avenue Historic District is a stretch of historic houses on Mountain Avenue in Princeton, New Jersey that date to the 19th and early 20th centuries. The 9-acre (3.6 ha) historic district was added to the National Register of Historic Places on February 2, 1995, for its significance in architecture and community planning. It includes 14 contributing buildings, and encompasses the north side of the road between the west side of the Mountain Lakes Preserve and Quarry Lane.

== History ==
=== Early Construction: 1701-1863 ===
The present-day district was part of a tract originally sold to the elder Richard Stockton by William Penn in 1701. Mountain Avenue was opened in 1793, as part of a road from Blawenburg to Princeton. By 1796, Peter Stryker owned an 80-acre tract which later became the Mountain Lakes preserve, as well as the lot on which 73 Mountain Avenue was later built. The section of the district running west from 73 Mountain Avenue was part of the property of French refugee John Baptist Teissiere by the early 19th century. In 1806, Stryker's property passed from his brother to Samuel Updike. A frame house, now demolished, was known to have been built on the property in the 1840s, shown on maps in the same location, set back from the modern house, until 1905. The present-day 73 Mountain Avenue, likely built in the same time period, may have been a secondary dwelling on the property or may have later been moved to its present location, first appearing in a 1903 map.

=== Continued growth ===
Samuel Updike's property passed through several owners after his 1863 death, eventually being purchased by Stephen Margerum Jr. in 1883. Margerum began damming a stream on the property to create ice, founding the Princeton Ice Company. The 80-acre property was operated as part of the Princeton Ice Company until its 1929 sale to Edgar Palmer, who passed the property to his widow, Elizabeth Grant Clark. 73 Mountain Avenue was being rented around this time. The 1.65 acres on which 73 Mountain Avenue sits was subdivided from the rest of the property in 1958, having become part of a suburban setting.

Philip Hendrickson brought the Teissiere property in 1863, possibly building a house on it, although no map records one. It was then bought by Rodman Henderson, a storeowner and contractor, in 1895. In 1900, Henderson began selling portions of his Mountain Avenue property. The first sale was to Francis J. Reed, who built 81 Mountain Avenue, finishing it in 1905. In 1907, he sold the lot at the eastern corner of Henderson Avenue. Henderson sold or gave the lots at 105, 107, and 111 Mountain Avenue to three of his sons between 1905 and 1919, later selling 139 out of the family in 1924. The remaining lots west of Henderson's house were subdivided in 1931, four years after his death.

== See also ==
- National Register of Historic Places listings in Mercer County, New Jersey
