= Hart–Hoch House =

- U.S. National Register of Historic Places
- New Jersey Register of Historic Places
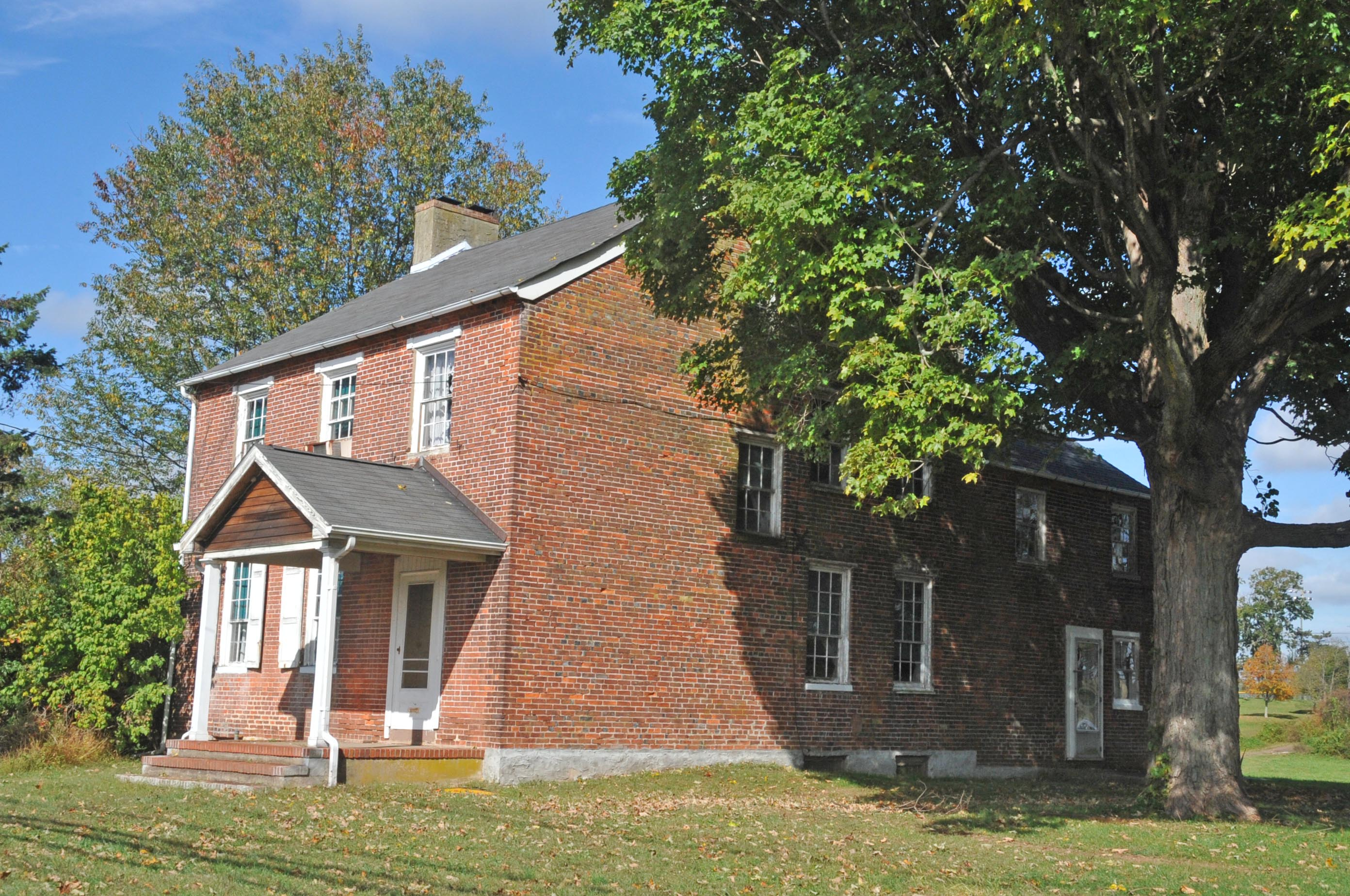

- Location within Mercer County, New Jersey Location within New Jersey Location within the United States
- Location: Southwest of Pennington on CR 546 and Scotch Road, Harts Corner, New Jersey
- Coordinates: 40°18′33.2″N 74°48′43.0″W
- Built: c. 1800
- Architectural style: Federal, Greek Revival
- NRHP reference No.: 73001109
- NJRHP No.: 1684

Significant dates
- Added to NRHP: March 14, 1973
- Designated NJRHP: August 7, 1972

The Hart–Hoch House is located in the Harts Corner section of Hopewell Township in Mercer County, New Jersey, United States. It was added to the National Register of Historic Places on March 14, 1973, for its significance in architecture. The historic two and one-half story red brick house was built around 1800. It features Flemish bond brickwork on the facade and Greek Revival architecture.

== History ==
The house was built around 1800 by Aaron Hart Sr. (1768–1853) on land he had inherited from his father Joseph Hart. The property then passed to Aaron Hart Jr. (1797–1886), and his son Dr. Amos M. Hart (1833–1908). His daughter, Fanny Hart Browne, sold it to Oliver Hoch, who sold it to his son Grant Hoch in 1935.

== See also ==
- National Register of Historic Places listings in Mercer County, New Jersey
