= House at 379 West State Street =

Historic house in New Jersey, United States

- U.S. National Register of Historic Places
- New Jersey Register of Historic Places
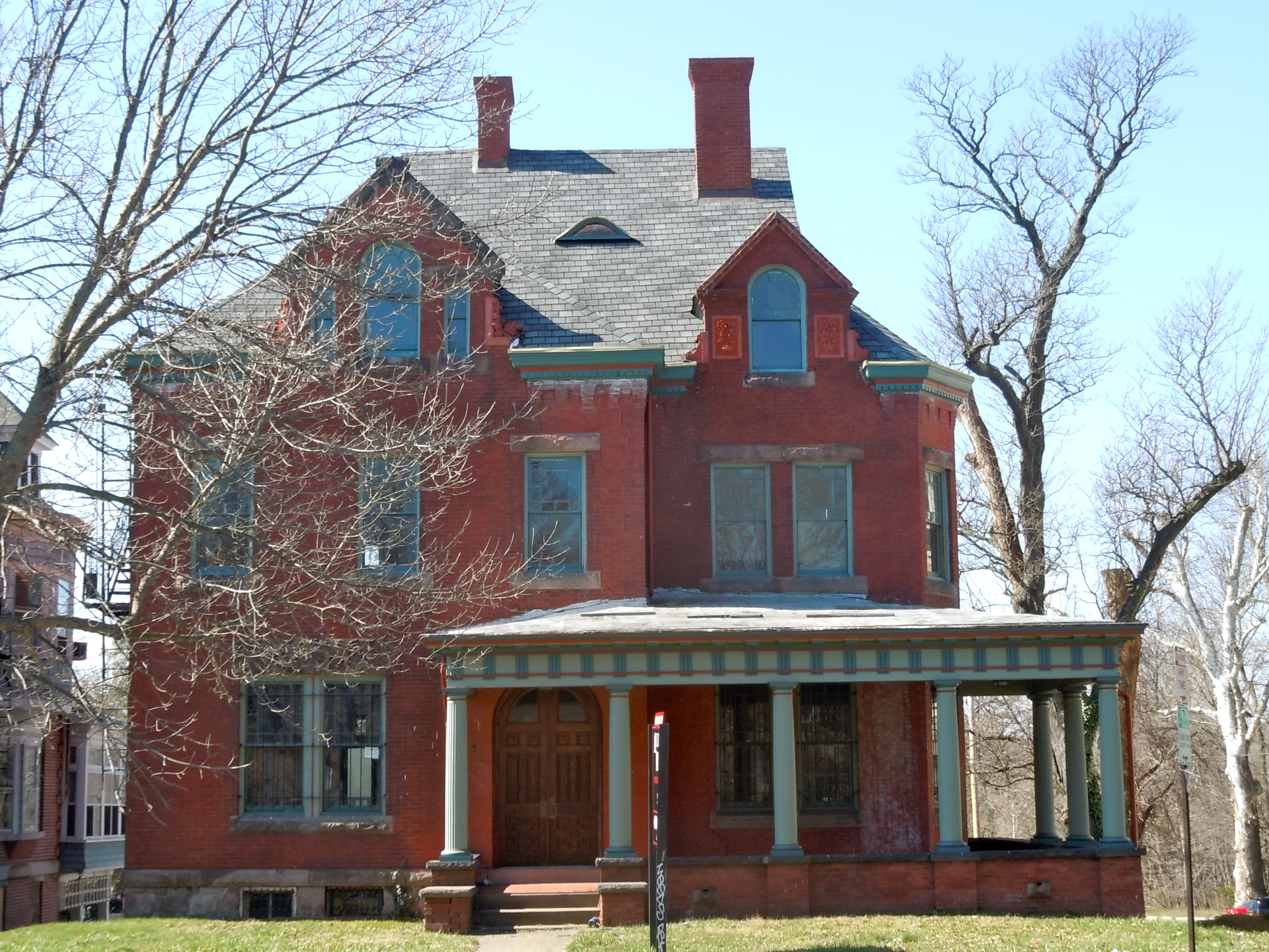

- Location within Mercer County, New Jersey Location within New Jersey Location within the United States
- Location: 379 West State Street, Trenton, New Jersey
- Coordinates: 40°13′27.7″N 74°46′39.0″W
- Area: less than 1 acre (0.40 ha)
- Built: late 19th century
- Architectural style: Queen Anne revival
- NRHP reference No.: 80002501
- NJRHP No.: 1808

Significant dates
- Added to NRHP: January 23, 1980
- Designated NJRHP: January 9, 1979

The House at 379 West State Street is a historic residence located in Trenton, New Jersey, built in the Queen Anne revival architectural style. The home was designed by noted Trenton architect William A. Poland for John A. Cambell and ready for occupancy in 1885. It was added to the National Register of Historic Places on January 23, 1980.

Currently, the building serves as the office for the African American Chamber of Commerce of New Jersey, contributing to its ongoing relevance as both a historic and functional space in the community.

== See also ==
- National Register of Historic Places listings in Mercer County, New Jersey
