= Rudolph V. Kuser Estate =

Historic house in New Jersey, United States

- U.S. National Register of Historic Places
- New Jersey Register of Historic Places
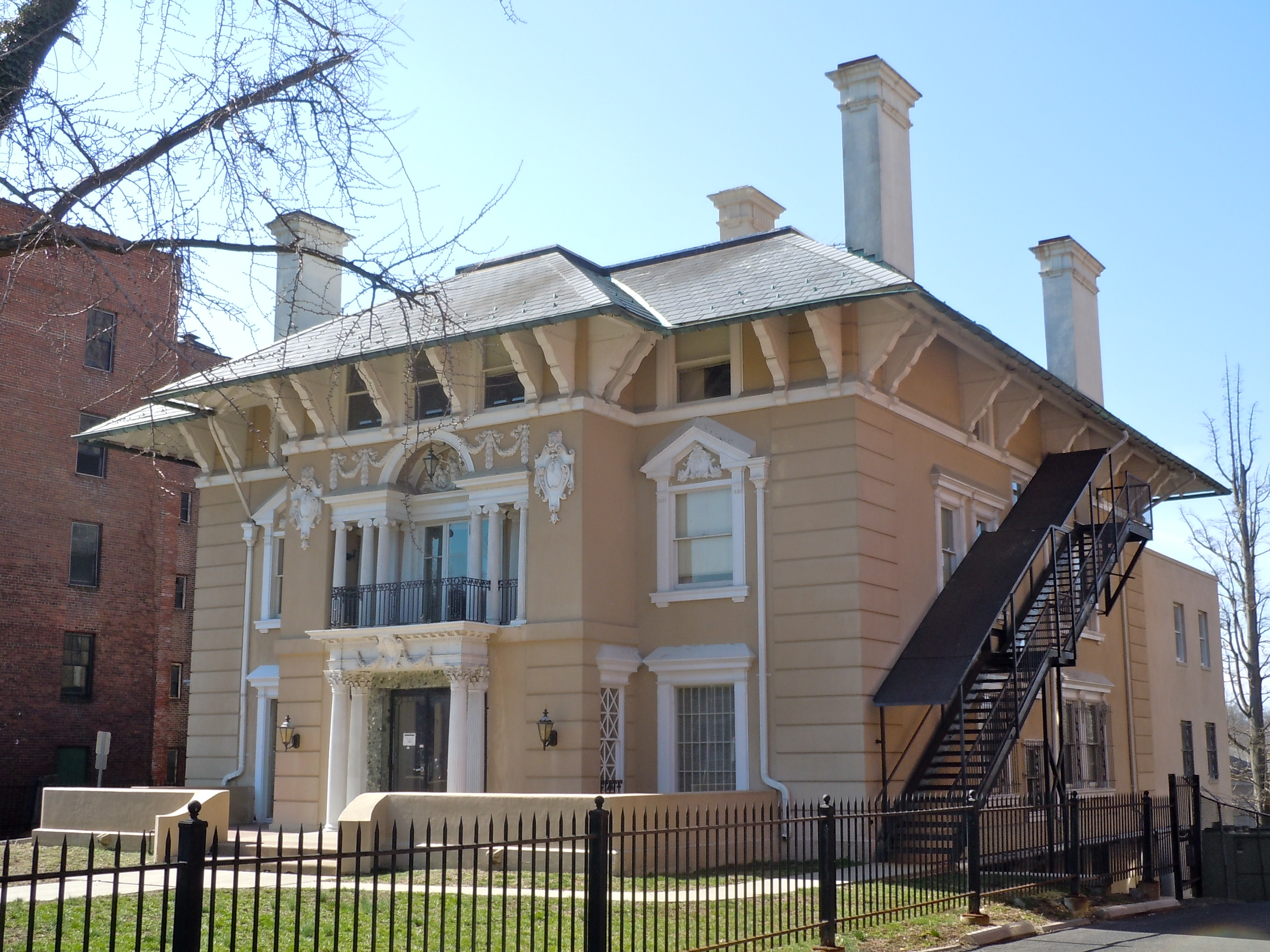

- Location within Mercer County, New Jersey Location within New Jersey Location within the United States
- Location: 315 West State Street, Trenton, New Jersey
- Coordinates: 40°13′23″N 74°46′36″W
- Area: less than one acre
- Built: 1905
- Architectural style: Colonial Revival
- NRHP reference No.: 79001501
- NJRHP No.: 1774

Significant dates
- Added to NRHP: August 24, 1979
- Designated NJRHP: June 5, 1979

Rudolph V. Kuser Estate is located in Trenton, Mercer County, New Jersey, United States. The building was built in 1905 and was added to the National Register of Historic Places on August 24, 1979.

== See also ==
- National Register of Historic Places listings in Mercer County, New Jersey
