= Mott School and Second Street School =

- U.S. National Register of Historic Places
- New Jersey Register of Historic Places
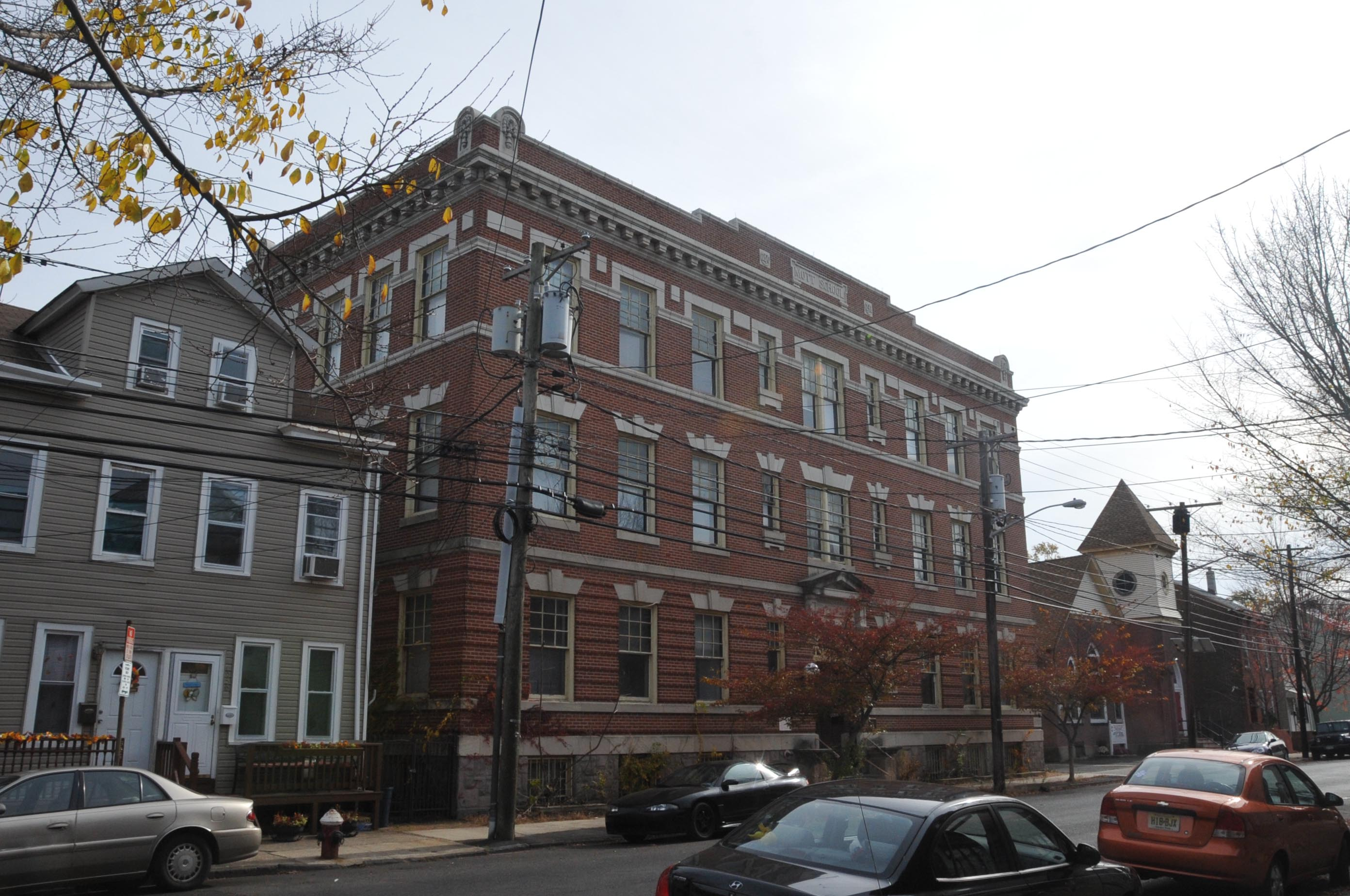
- The Mott School

- Location within Mercer County, New Jersey Location within New Jersey Location within the United States
- Location: 643-645 Second Street, 660 Centre Street Trenton, New Jersey
- Coordinates: 40°12′03.9″N 74°45′25.3″W
- Area: less than 0.5 acres (0.20 ha)
- Built: 1854 (Second Street School), 1876-1911 (Mott School)
- Architectural style: Georgian
- NRHP reference No.: 86000809
- NJRHP No.: 1783

Significant dates
- Added to NRHP: April 15, 1986
- Designated NJRHP: March 5, 1986

The Mott School and Second Street School are historic former school buildings in Trenton, New Jersey. Together they cover the continuum of education in the area. The Second Street School, formerly known as the Nottingham Township School, was built in 1854 when public education was voluntary and non-standardized. The Mott School was built in stages from 1876-1911 during the era of institutionalization and centralization of public schooling. It continued in use until 1980.

== Gallery ==
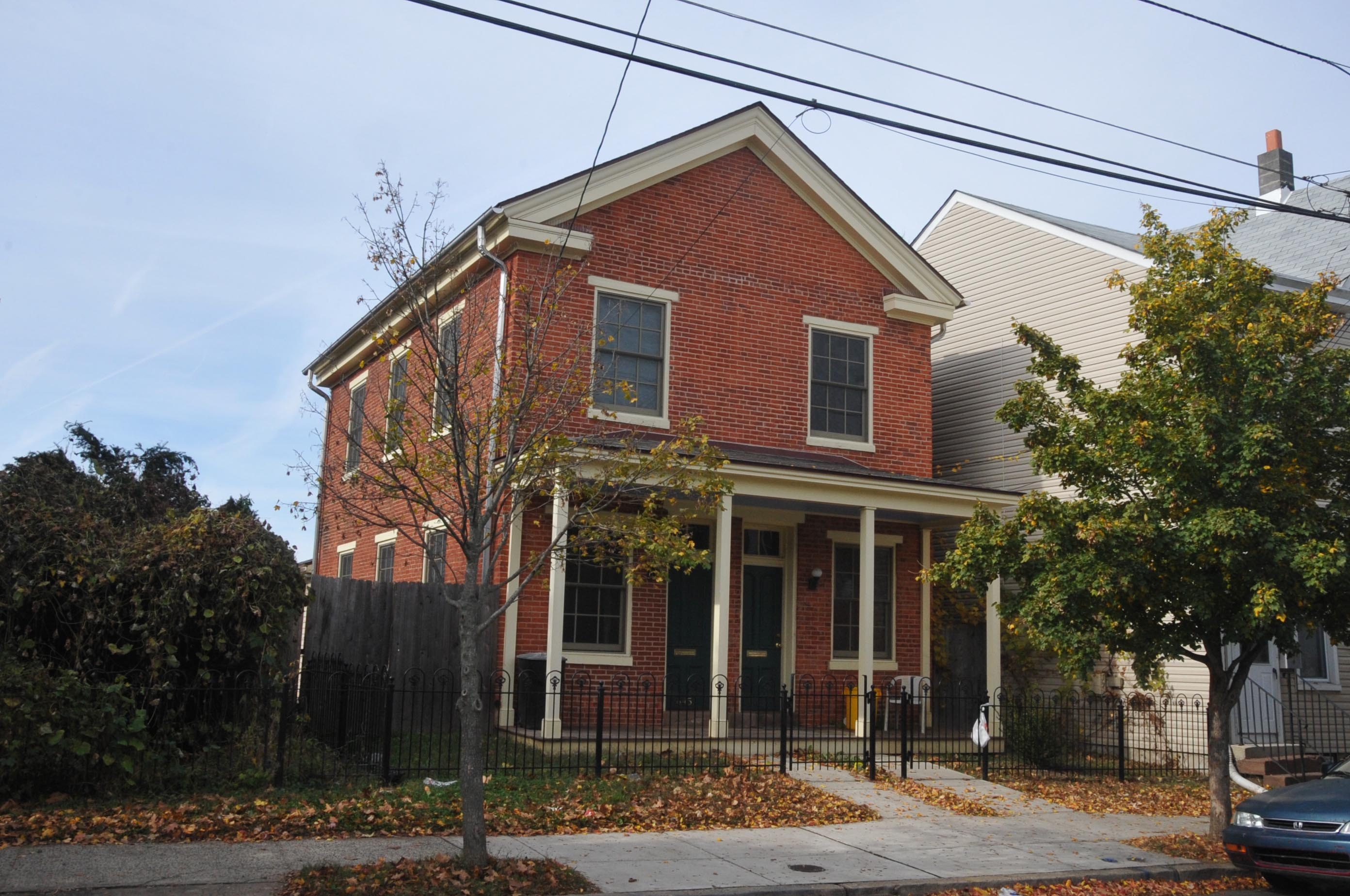
The Second Street School

== See also ==
- National Register of Historic Places listings in Mercer County, New Jersey
