= Somerset Roller Mills =

- U.S. National Register of Historic Places
- New Jersey Register of Historic Places
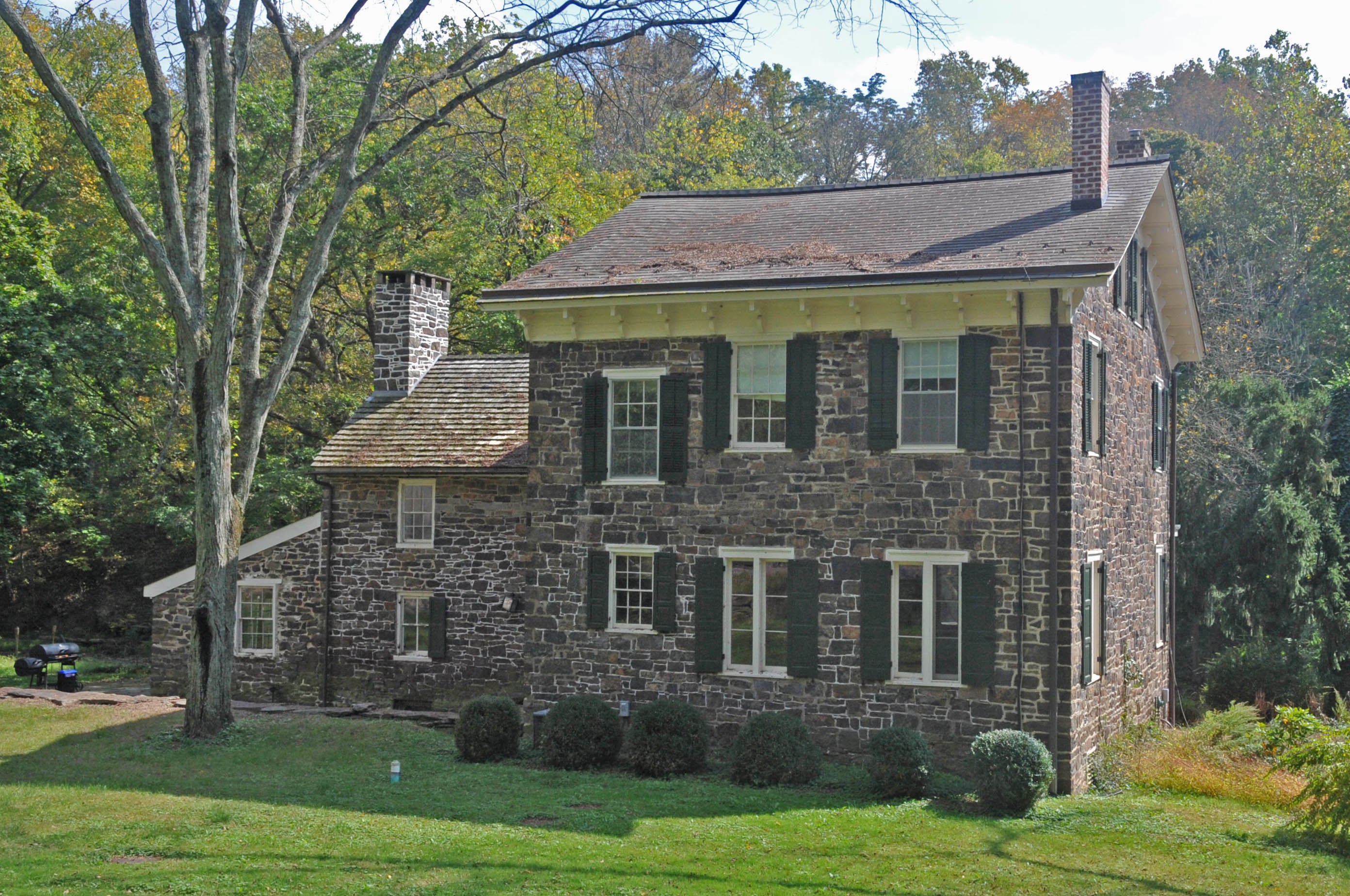

- Location within Mercer County, New Jersey Location within New Jersey Location within the United States
- Location: 1200 Daniel Bray Highway, Titusville, New Jersey
- Coordinates: 40°16′43.7″N 74°51′12.7″W
- Area: about 12 acres (4.9 ha)
- Built: 18th–19th centuries
- Architectural style: Vernacular
- NRHP reference No.: 74001171
- NJRHP No.: 1699

Significant dates
- Added to NRHP: November 19, 1974
- Designated NJRHP: July 1, 1974

The Somerset Roller Mills, also known as the Jacobs Creek Grist Mill, are a small former gristmill complex, originally built in the early 18th century, near Titusville in Hopewell Township of Mercer County, New Jersey. It was added to the National Register of Historic Places on November 19, 1974 for its significance in architecture, commerce, and industry.

== History ==
Tradition holds that Isaac Smith received a 1,000 acres (400 ha) land grant in 1726 from the English Crown. It is thought that shortly thereafter he built the first house and mill on the site, shipping processed grain down the river to Philadelphia. It is probable that the mill provided flour to the Continental Army during the American Revolution. The opening of the Delaware and Raritan Canal next to the mill in 1834 greatly improved its business, leading to its expansion in the 1840s. The mill continued in operation until the early Depression by which point modern automated mill technology rendered its manual operations obsolete. The mill documents the beginnings, development, and decline of a pre-20th century rural manufacturing process.

== See also ==
- National Register of Historic Places listings in Mercer County, New Jersey
