= Bear Tavern Road–Jacob's Creek Crossing Rural Historic District =

Historic district in New Jersey, United States

- U.S. National Register of Historic Places
- U.S. Historic district
- New Jersey Register of Historic Places
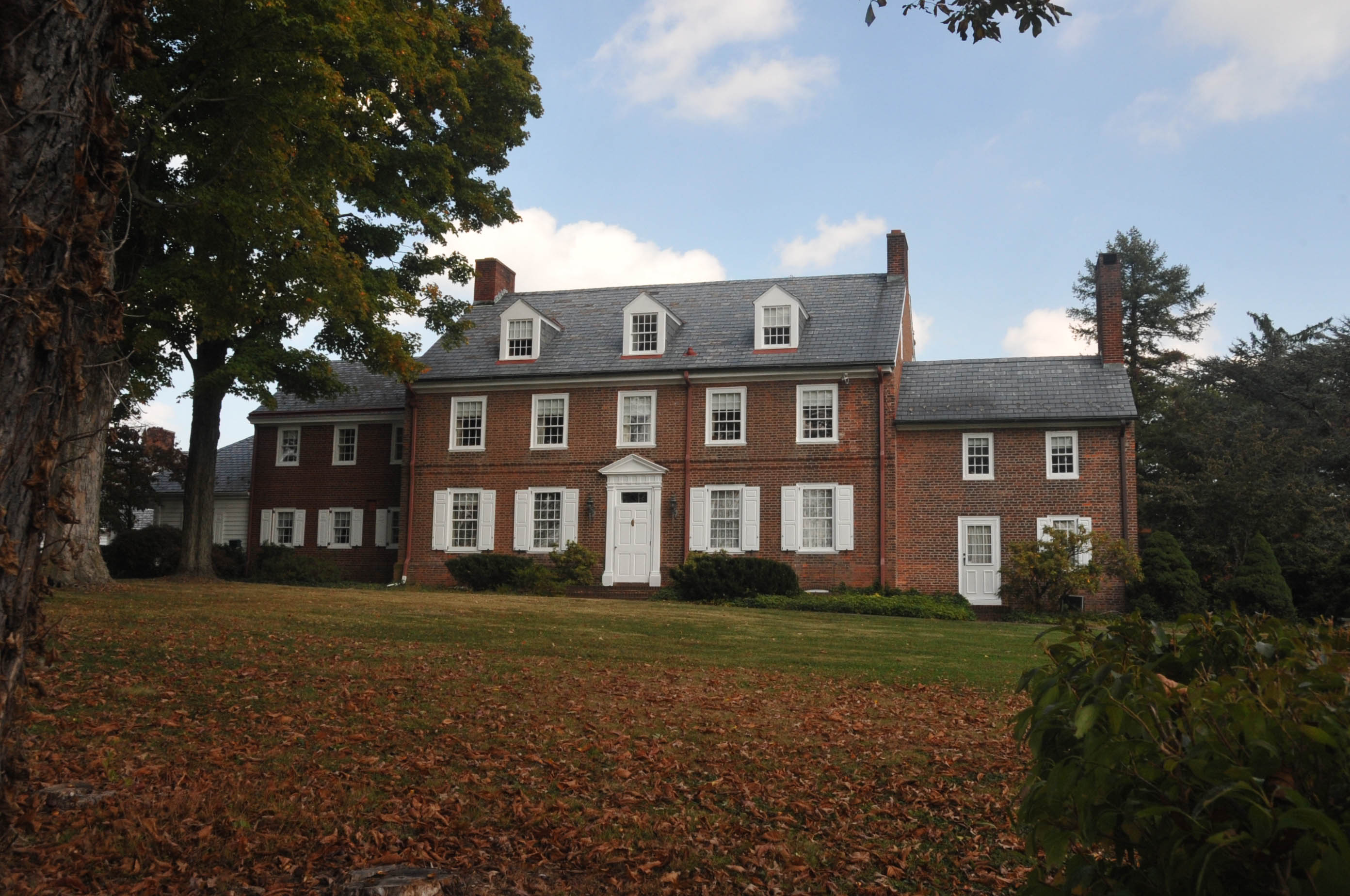
- John Burroughs Farmstead (1800), 1132 Bear Tavern Road

- Location within Mercer County, New Jersey Location within New Jersey Location within the United States
- Location: Farms along Bear Tavern Road and intersection with Jacob's Creek Road in Hopewell Township and Ewing Township New Jersey
- Coordinates: 40°17′54.2″N 74°50′51.1″W
- Area: 395 acres (160 ha)
- Built: 1729-1930
- Architect: Multiple
- Architectural style: Georgian, Federal, Greek Revival
- NRHP reference No.: 11000872
- NJRHP No.: 5112

Significant dates
- Added to NRHP: November 30, 2011
- Designated NJRHP: October 3, 2011

The Bear Tavern Road–Jacob's Creek Crossing Rural Historic District covers the farms along Bear Tavern Road north of its intersection with Jacob's Creek Road, as well as the bridge and intersection itself. Bear Tavern Road dates to 1729 and George Washington led the Continental Army along it in 1776, on his way from crossing the Delaware to the Battle of Trenton. The district still reflects its 18th and 19th century patterns of development.

== See also ==
- Bear Tavern, New Jersey
- National Register of Historic Places listings in Mercer County, New Jersey
