= Mount Rose Distillery Archaeological Site =

- U.S. National Register of Historic Places
- New Jersey Register of Historic Places
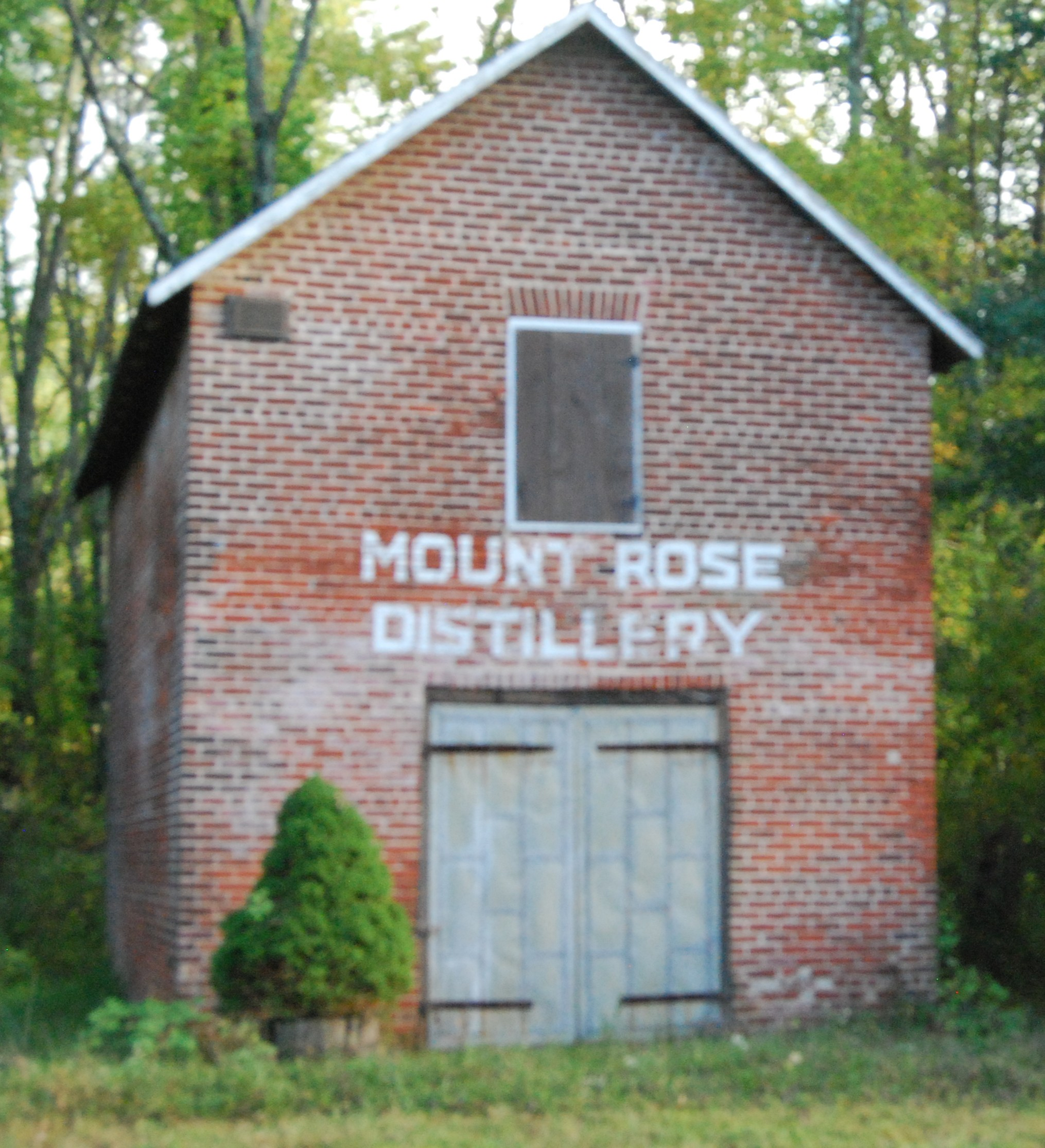
- Mount Rose Distillery

- Location within Mercer County, New Jersey Location within New Jersey Location within the United States
- Location: 192 Pennington-Rocky Hill Road, Hopewell Township, New Jersey
- Coordinates: 40°22′2.5″N 74°44′49.5″W
- Area: 1.3 acres (0.53 ha)
- NRHP reference No.: 96001471
- NJRHP No.: 3258

Significant dates
- Added to NRHP: December 12, 1996
- Designated NJRHP: September 8, 1995

The Mount Rose Distillery Archaeological Site is a 1.3-acre (0.53 ha) archaeological site located at 192 Pennington-Rocky Hill Road in the Mount Rose section of Hopewell Township in Mercer County, New Jersey, United States. The site was added to the National Register of Historic Places on December 12, 1996, for its significance in archaeology and industry, in particular the history of cider milling and distilleries.

== History and description ==
The Mount Rose Distillery, also known as the Cider Mill, is a two-story brick building constructed c. 1875. It was used for storage and administration of the distillery operation. The distillery works were operated by local Mount Rose families, the Drakes and the Stouts, from the 1840s to the 1920s, producing peach brandy, apple cider, and apple whiskey.

== See also ==
- National Register of Historic Places listings in Mercer County, New Jersey
