= Abbott–Decou House =

- U.S. National Register of Historic Places
- New Jersey Register of Historic Places
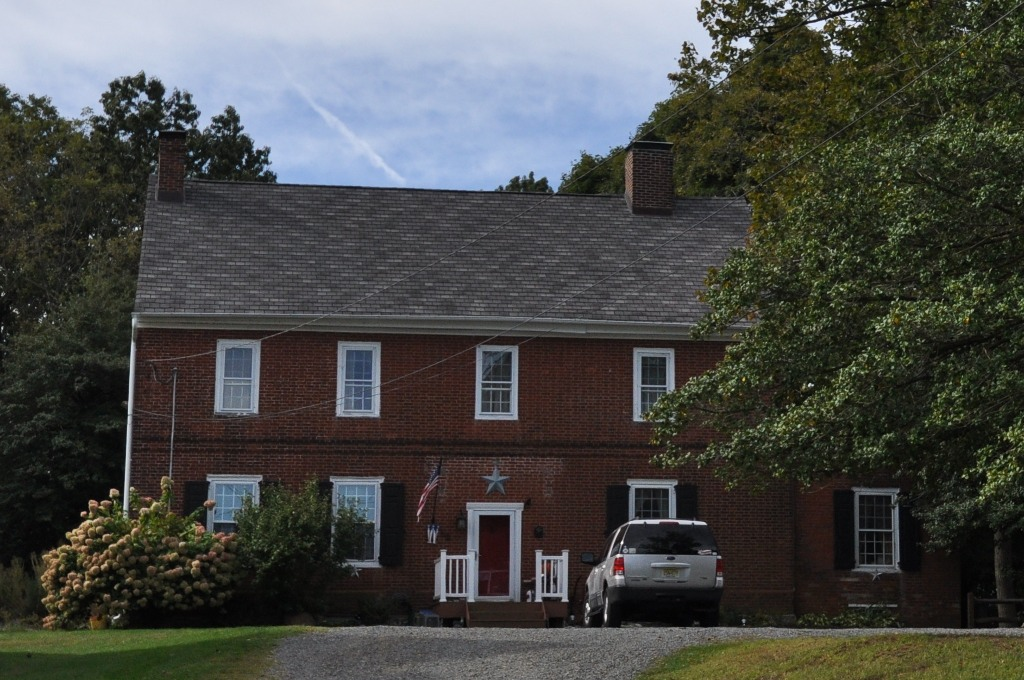

- Location within Mercer County, New Jersey Location within New Jersey Location within the United States
- Location: 58 Soloff Drive, Hamilton Township, Mercer County, New Jersey
- Coordinates: 40°11′08″N 74°43′11″W
- Area: 15 acres (6.1 ha)
- Built: 1797
- Architect: Samuel Abbott
- Architectural style: Georgian
- NRHP reference No.: 76001160
- NJRHP No.: 1656

Significant dates
- Added to NRHP: July 1, 1976
- Designated NJRHP: January 7, 1976

The Abbott–Decou House was built by Samuel Abbott in 1797 in what is now Hamilton Township, Mercer County, New Jersey. In 1888 it came into the possession of the DeCou family, whose matriarch, known locally as "Aunt Martha," had a considerable influence in local affairs. The house is considered a particularly fine example of 18th century Quaker Georgian architecture.

== See also ==
- National Register of Historic Places listings in Mercer County, New Jersey
