= Higbee Street School =

- U.S. National Register of Historic Places
- New Jersey Register of Historic Places
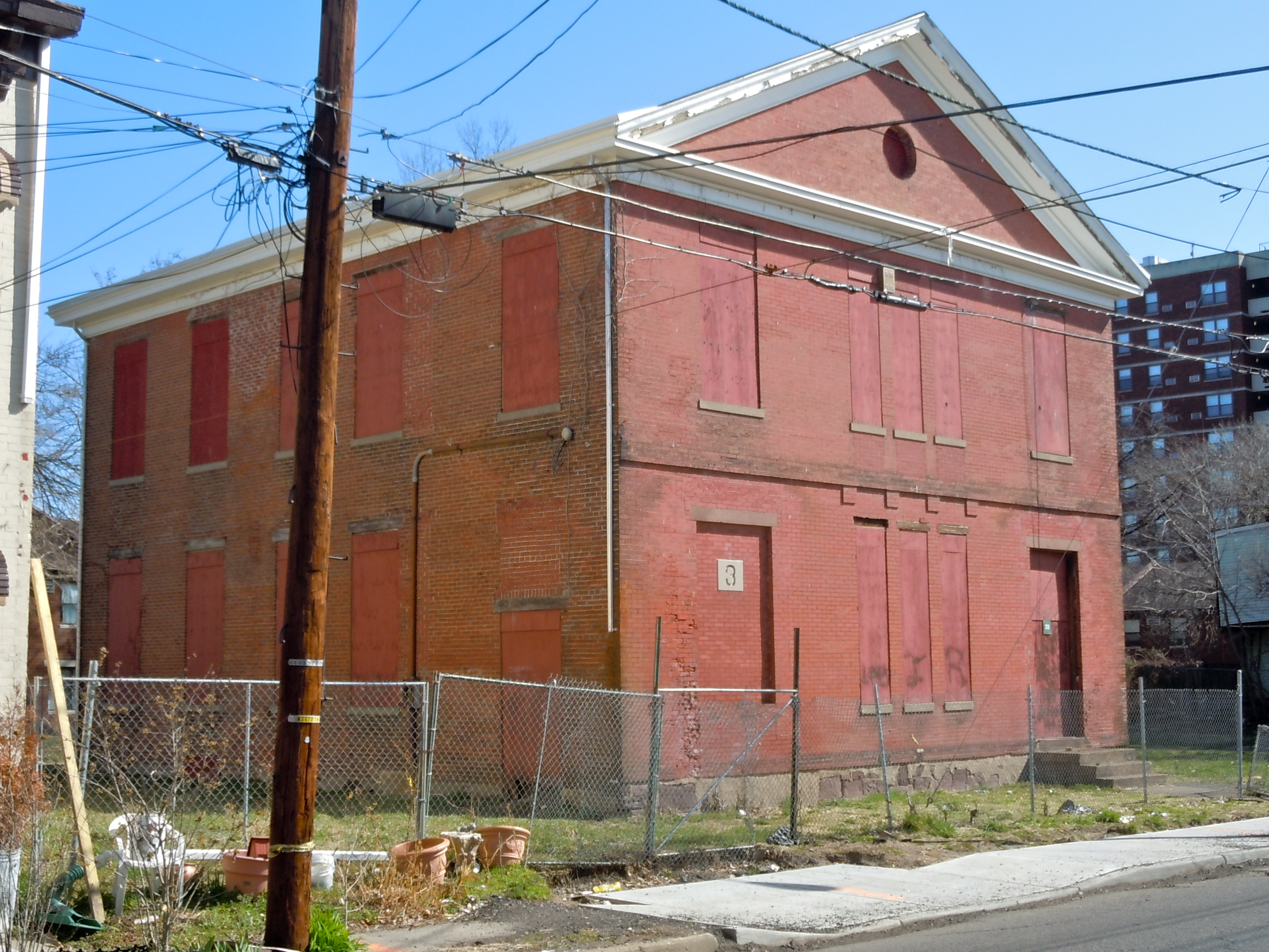

- Location within Mercer County, New Jersey Location within New Jersey Location within the United States
- Location: 20 Bellevue Avenue, Trenton, New Jersey
- Coordinates: 40°13′32″N 74°46′07″W
- Area: 1 acre (0.40 ha)
- Built: 1857
- Architect: Evernham and Hill
- Architectural style: Greek Revival
- NRHP reference No.: 95000409
- NJRHP No.: 2799

Significant dates
- Added to NRHP: April 14, 1995
- Designated NJRHP: March 3, 1995

The Higbee Street School is a historic educational building situated in Trenton, Mercer County, New Jersey, United States. It was built in 1857, and was added to the National Register of Historic Places on April 14, 1995.

The school is a double-story brick structure in the Greek Revival style. It was the first facility in Trenton constructed specifically for the free public education of African-American children. It was designed by the architectural firm Evernham and Hill. The building's design was influenced by the 19th-century design concepts of education reformers. It is one of the first establishments to utilize these designs.

== See also ==
- National Register of Historic Places listings in Mercer County, New Jersey
