= Donald Grant Herring Estate =

Historic house in New Jersey, United States

- U.S. National Register of Historic Places
- New Jersey Register of Historic Places
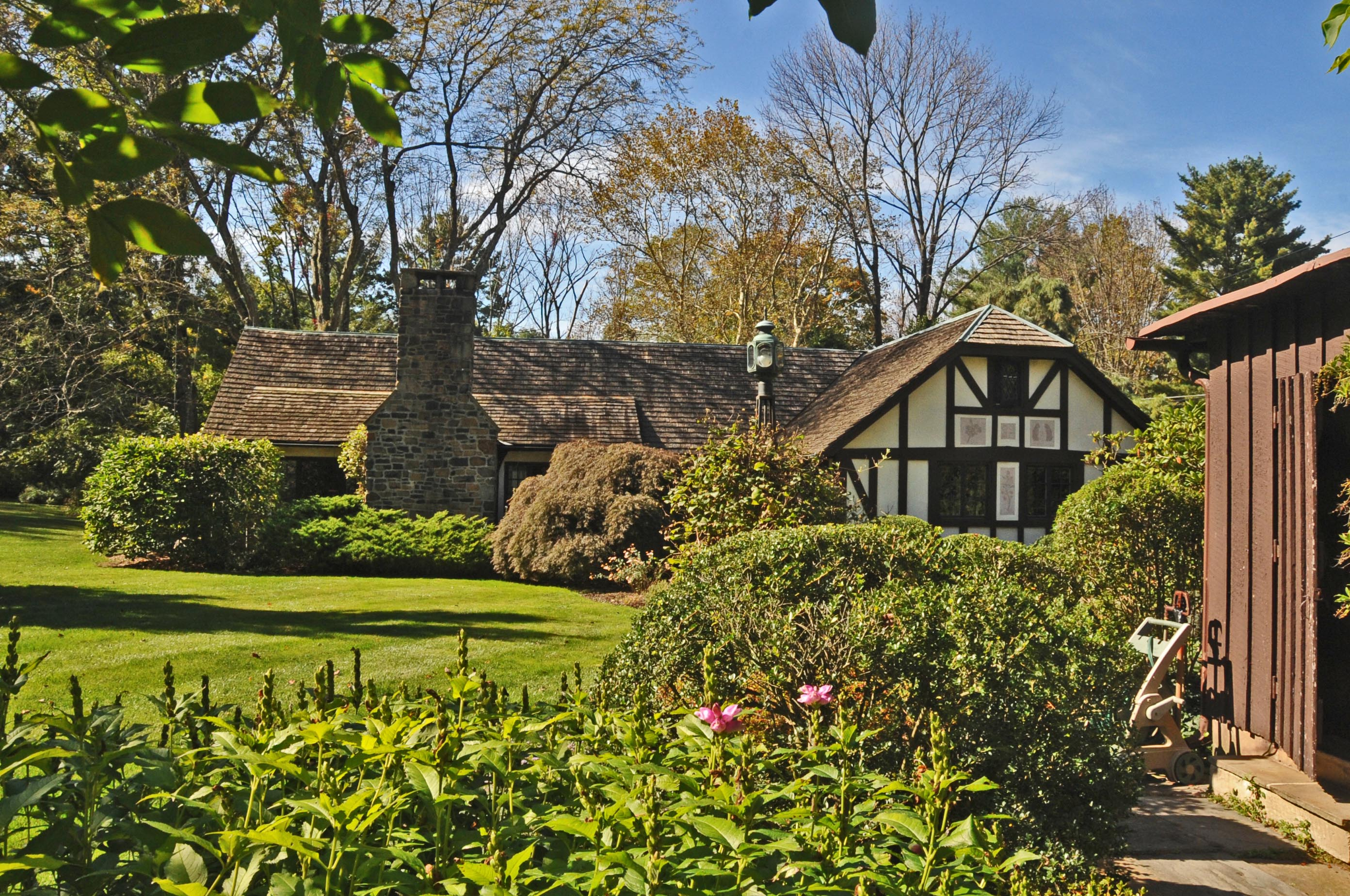

- Location within Mercer County, New Jersey Location within New Jersey Location within the United States
- Location: 52, 72, 75 Arreton Road, Princeton, New Jersey
- Coordinates: 40°22′55.1″N 74°39′54.3″W
- Built: 1919
- Architect: Wilson Eyre Jr.
- Architectural style: Tudor Revival; Arts and Crafts
- NRHP reference No.: 91001927
- NJRHP No.: 1745

Significant dates
- Added to NRHP: January 17, 1992
- Designated NJRHP: November 25, 1991

The Donald Grant Herring Estate, called Rothers Barrows, was designed by Wilson Eyre Jr. in 1919 for Donald Herring, a member of the Princeton University faculty. The three properties at 52, 72, and 75-77 Arreton Road are the surviving remnants of the 117-acre estate, which was subdivided in 1949. The estate's significance is as the last, chronologically, of the estates that once ringed Princeton. It is one of the finest examples of the Arts and Crafts movement in Central New Jersey.

In 2016, the estate was put up for sale, listed at $3.8 million.

== Gallery ==
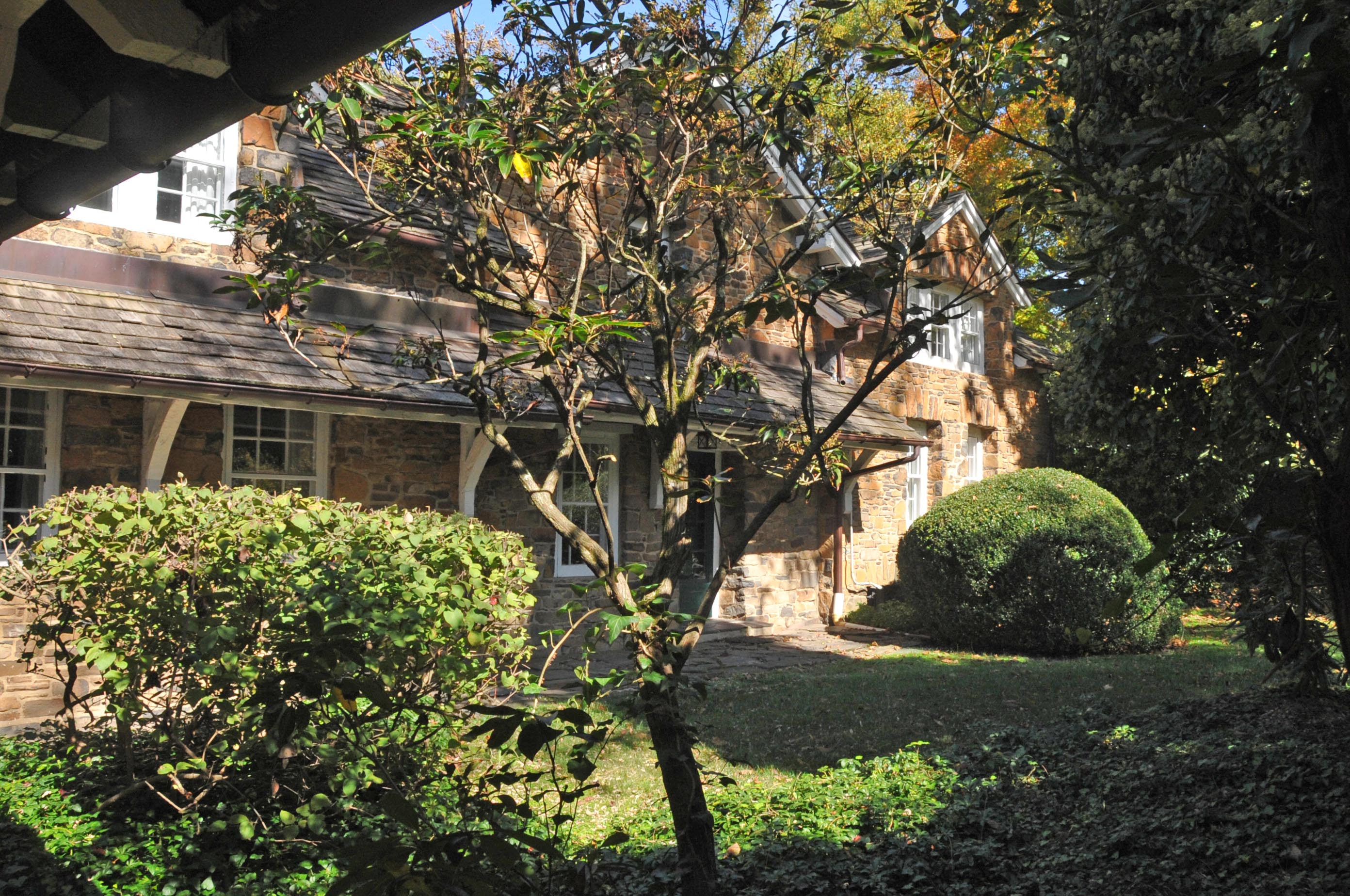

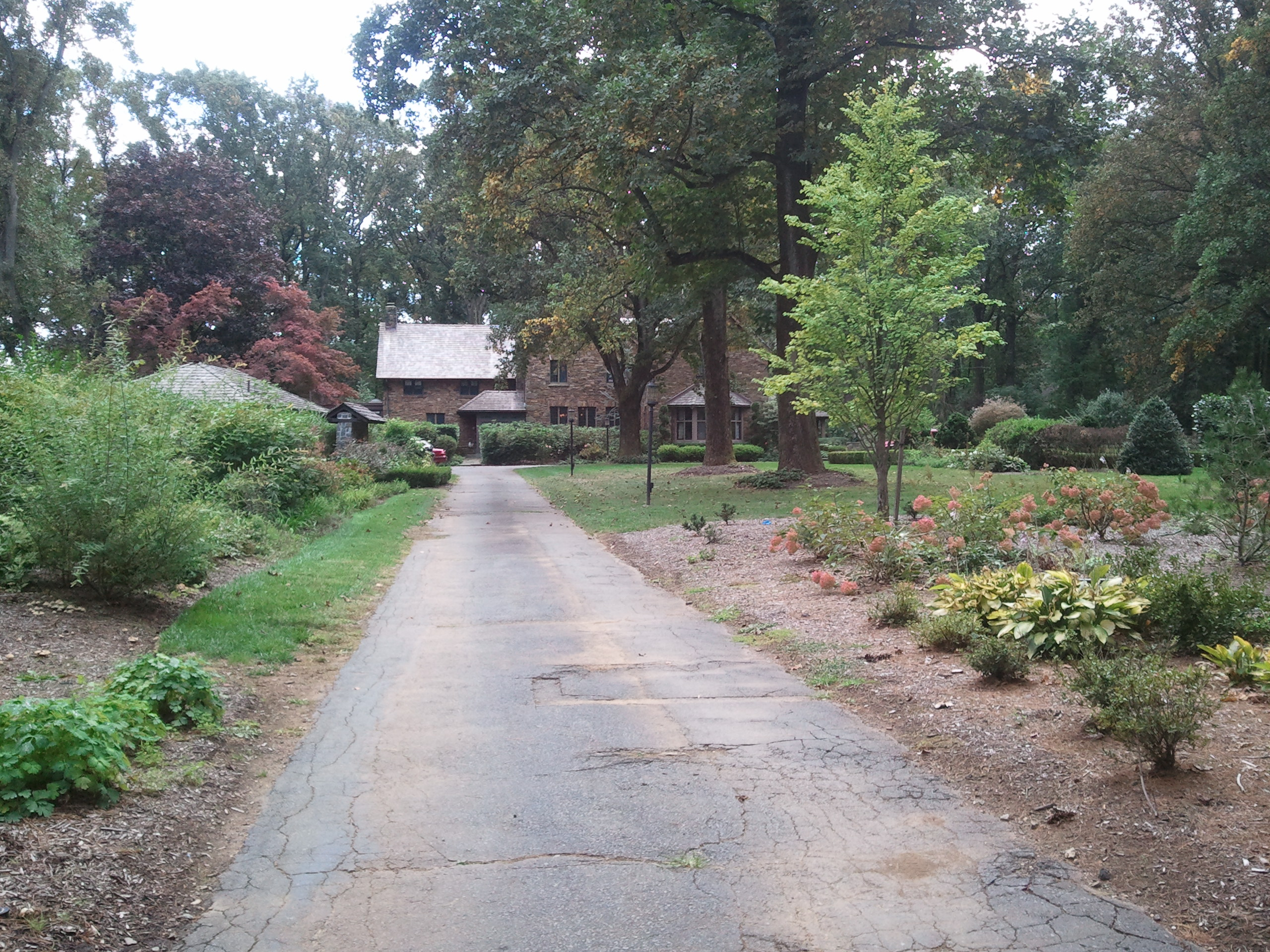

== See also ==
- National Register of Historic Places listings in Mercer County, New Jersey
