= Ichabod Leigh House =

- U.S. National Register of Historic Places
- New Jersey Register of Historic Places
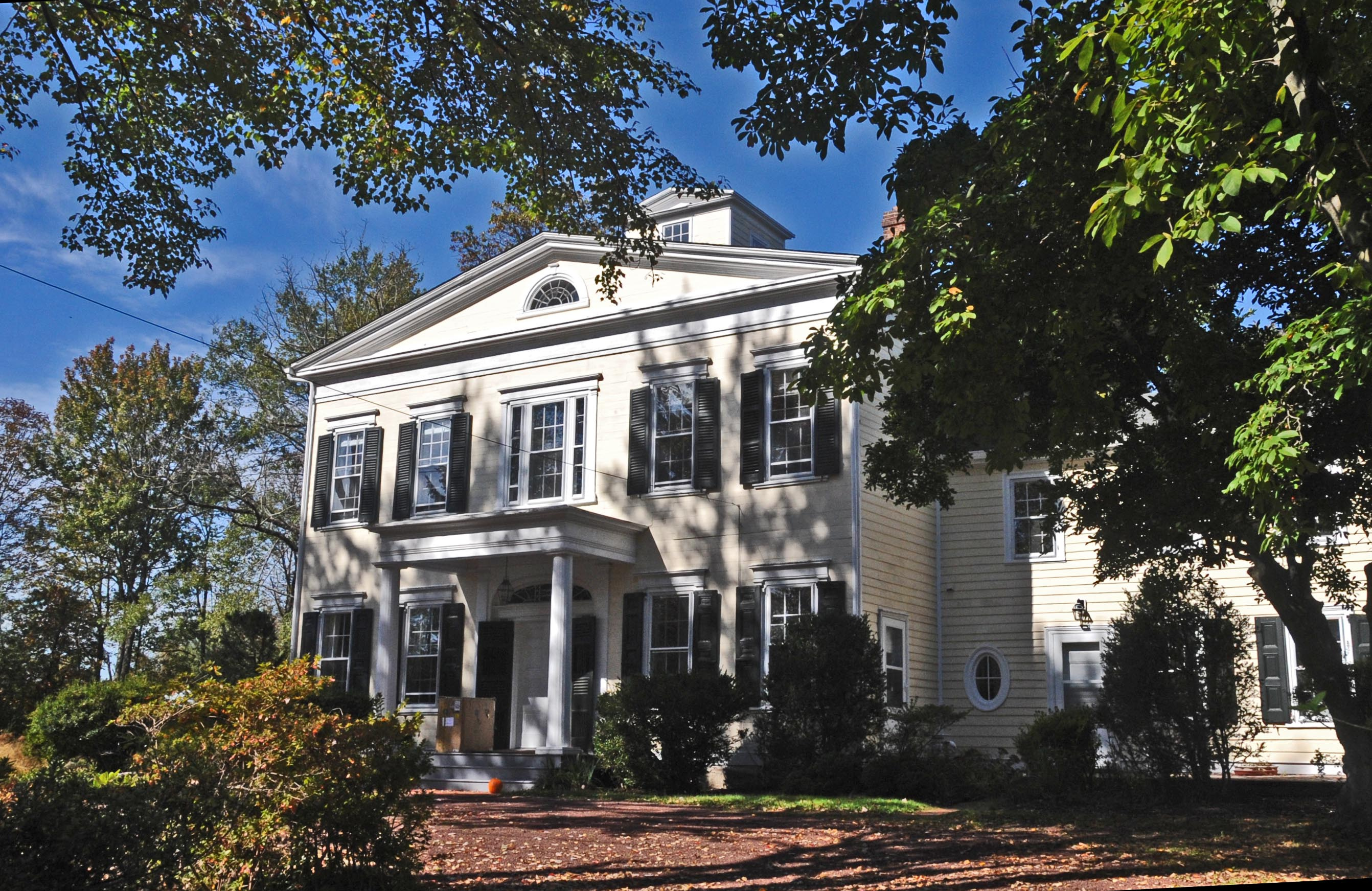

- Location within Mercer County, New Jersey Location within New Jersey Location within the United States
- Location: 953 Cherry Valley Road, Hopewell Township, New Jersey
- Coordinates: 40°22′21″N 74°43′55″W
- Built: c. 1835
- Architectural style: Greek Revival
- NRHP reference No.: 75001139
- NJRHP No.: 1692

Significant dates
- Added to NRHP: March 4, 1975
- Designated NJRHP: November 1, 1974

The Ichabod Leigh House is a historic Greek Revival style house constructed c. 1835 and located at 953 Cherry Valley Road in the Mount Rose section of Hopewell Township in Mercer County, New Jersey, United States. It was added to the National Register of Historic Places on March 4, 1975, for its significance in architecture.

== History and description ==
The house is two and one-half stories high and features a cupola and a pediment with a lunette window. The 4-acre (1.6 ha) property also features extensive display gardens. The nomination form describes it as "the most sophisticated and refined Greek Revival domestic structure in Mercer County". It was built c. 1835 for Ichabod S. Leigh of Somerset County. He sold the property in 1853. Subsequent owners include James Howell and Thomas B. Jackson.

== See also ==
- National Register of Historic Places listings in Mercer County, New Jersey
