= East Trenton Public Library =

- U.S. National Register of Historic Places
- New Jersey Register of Historic Places
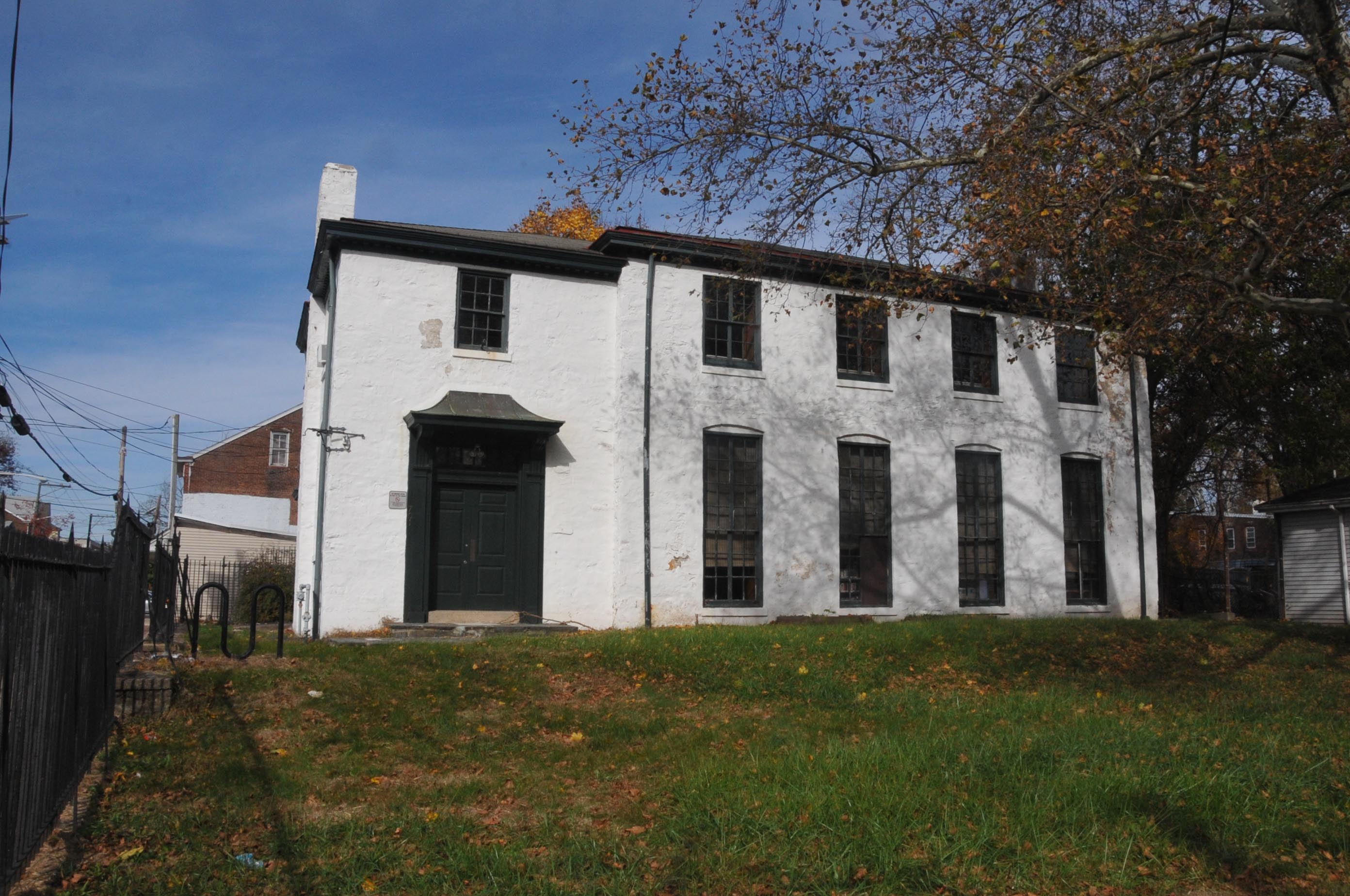

- Location within Mercer County, New Jersey Location within New Jersey Location within the United States
- Location: 701 North Clinton Avenue, Trenton, New Jersey
- Coordinates: 40°13′59.7″N 74°44′30.4″W
- Area: less than 1 acre (0.40 ha)
- Built: 1796-1934
- Architectural style: Colonial
- NRHP reference No.: 08000134
- NJRHP No.: 4445

Significant dates
- Added to NRHP: March 5, 2008
- Designated NJRHP: December 20, 2007

The East Trenton Public Library, in Trenton, New Jersey, was built as the Samuel Dickinson house, c. 1796 at the center of a large farm. In 1926 it became a public library, in which capacity it continues to serve.

The building has a tremendous history, from its original use starting in 1796 as the home of the son of Revolutionary War General Philemon Dickinson, to its service as a home for Civil War orphans, a factory, and a school. In the 1920s, the building was being used by the Blue Triangle Club, an organization affiliated with the local YWCA, that served the community as a classroom, library, and child clinic. In 1926, the building was transformed into a branch of the Trenton Public Library system. This structure is the oldest building still standing in the East Trenton neighborhood.

== See also ==
- National Register of Historic Places listings in Mercer County, New Jersey
