= Jeremiah Vandyke House =

- U.S. National Register of Historic Places
- New Jersey Register of Historic Places
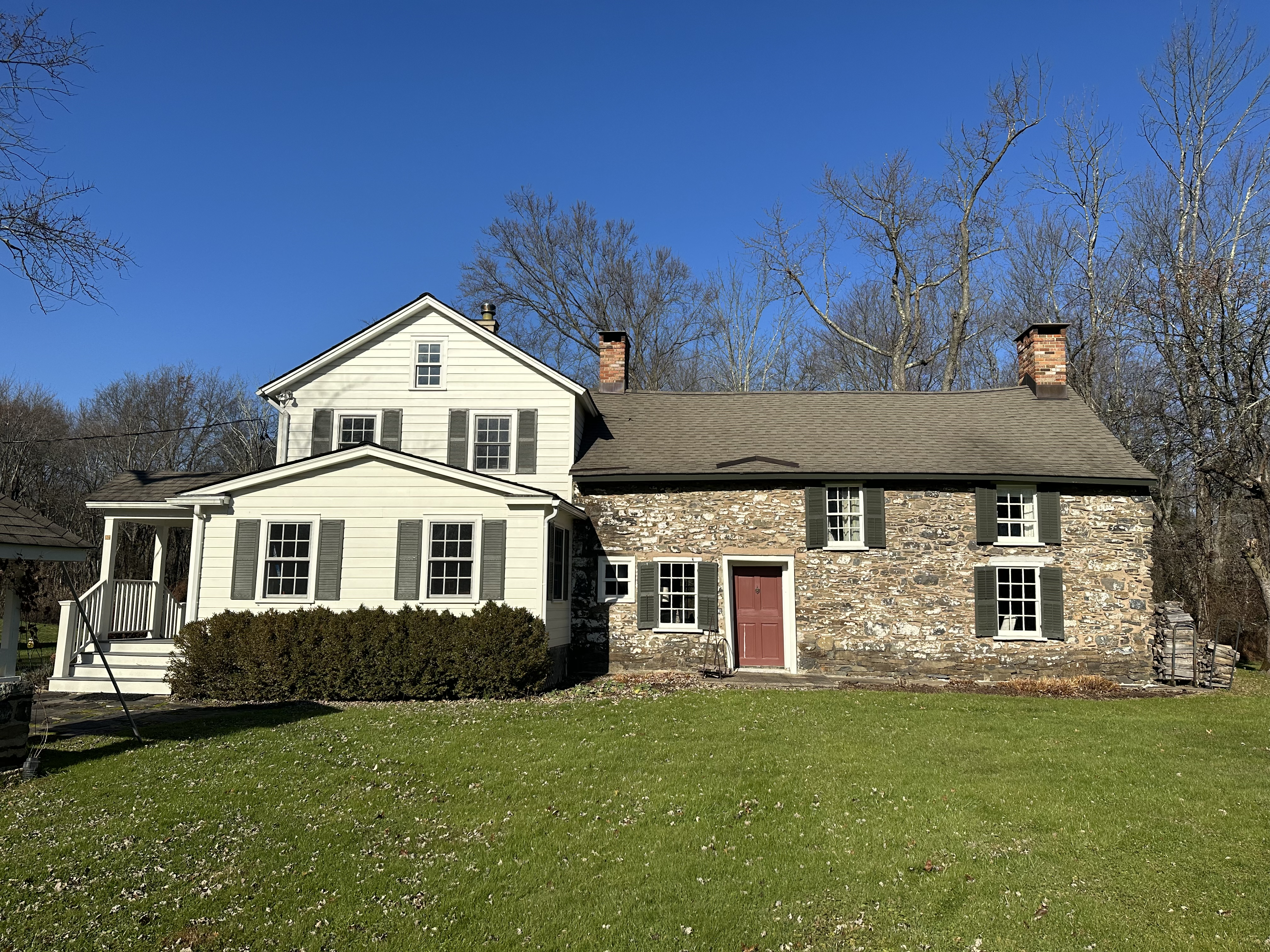

- Location within Mercer County, New Jersey Location within New Jersey Location within the United States
- Location: 91 Featherbed Lane, Hopewell Township
- Coordinates: 40°24′33″N 74°46′50″W
- Area: 4.8 acres (1.9 ha)
- NRHP reference No.: 78001769
- NJRHP No.: 1705

Significant dates
- Added to NRHP: March 29, 1978
- Designated NJRHP: December 27, 1973

The Jeremiah Vandyke House, also known as the Andrew B. Hankins House, is a historic house located at 91 Featherbed Lane in Hopewell Township of Mercer County, New Jersey, United States. It was added to the National Register of Historic Places on March 29, 1978, for its significance in architecture.

The home is of interest because it is one of few of this style of home that would have been, at the time, a very common and unremarkable Dutch Colonial fieldstone house. The original stone part of the building measures 29x16 feet and consists of a single room downstairs with a central staircase. The west end of this room has an open fireplace with an oak lintel. The east wall has a smaller fireplace with a simple early 19th century mantel. The exposed ceiling has chamfered hewn oak beams, carrying wide floorboards. Upstairs are two bedrooms and a short hallway.

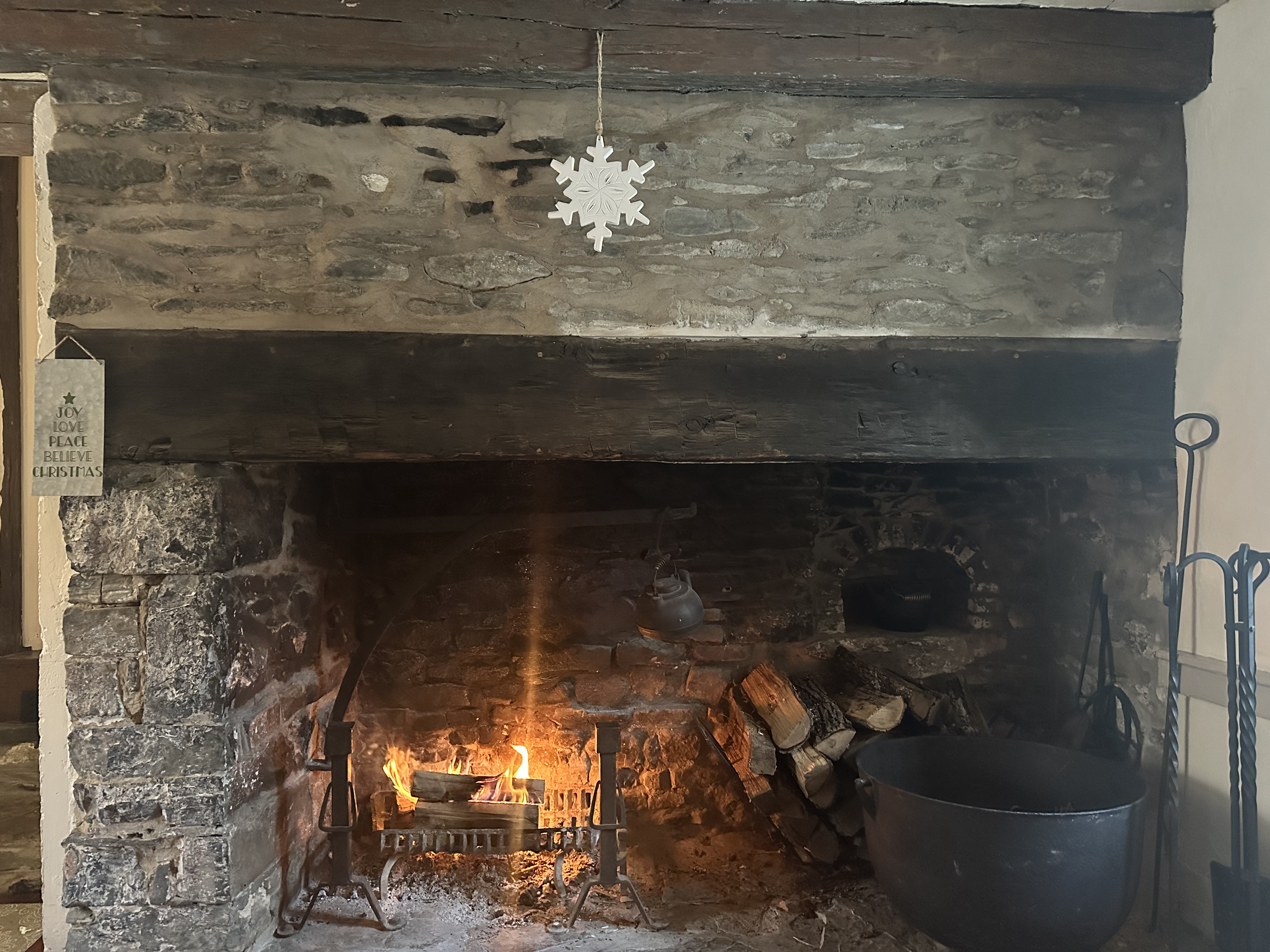
Jeremiah Vandyke House Fireplace
