= Jacobs Creek (New Jersey) =

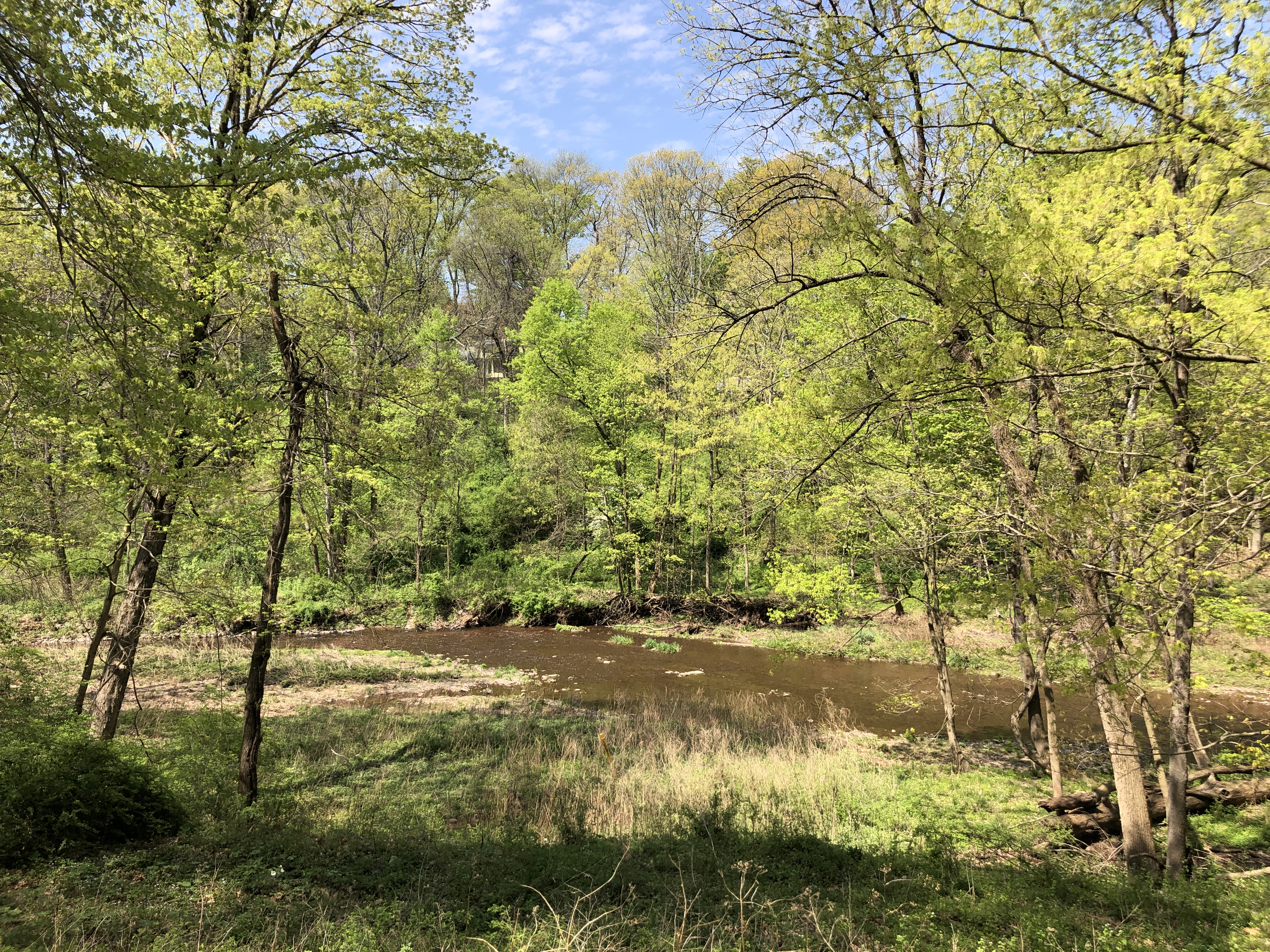
- Spring view across a forested section of Jacobs Creek from Jacobs Creek Road in the Mountainview section of Ewing Township

- Location of the mouth of Jacobs Creek in New Jersey

Location
- Country: United States
- State: New Jersey
- County: Mercer

Physical characteristics
- Source
  - coordinates: 40°21′28.44″N 74°49′30.54″W
- Mouth: Delaware River
  - coordinates: 40°16′40.39″N 74°51′16.59″W
  - elevation: 23 ft (7.0 m)
- Basin size: 13.3 mi^{2} (34 km^{2})

Basin features
- Tributaries
  - left: Woolsey Brook

Jacobs Creek is a tributary of the Delaware River in Mercer County in the U.S. state of New Jersey. From its headwaters in Hopewell Township, the creek flows generally south and southwest. Along the creek's lower course, it flows along the border between Hopewell Township and Ewing Township, entering the Delaware River between Lambertville and Trenton.

Arising along the west flank of Pennington Mountain, elevation 381 feet (116 m), Jacobs Creek flows under Poor Farm Road, through Woosamonsa Ridge Preserve and under Woosamonsa Road before reaching Pennington-Harbourton Road (County Route 623). Further downstream, it passes under Pennington-Titusville Road and then Washington Crossing-Pennington Road (CR 546). After receiving Woolsey Brook from the left, Jacobs Creek flows roughly parallel to Jacobs Creek Road (CR 637), which is on the left bank, and passes under Bear Farm Road (CR 579). The creek turns southwest as it reaches the boundary between Hopewell Township and Ewing Township and follows this boundary, crossing it several times before passing under River Road (New Jersey Route 29), the Delaware and Raritan Canal and its towpath and entering the Delaware River.

Jacobs Creek Trail, runs 1.3 miles (2.1 km) along the creek between Pennington-Harbourton Road on the north (upstream end) and Pennington-Titusville Road on the south with an additional 0.25 miles (0.40 km) spur south of Pennington-Titusville Road. The trail environs include a mixture of bottomlands, bluffs, and open spaces. Deer, fox, amphibians, and reptiles frequent the area. Birds near the trail and creek may include Carolina wrens, woodpeckers, red-eyed vireos and Baltimore orioles. Evergreens, eastern redcedars, maples, hickories, ashes, and oaks grow along the main trail. The largest red oak in the Hopewell Valley is found in the preserve.

== See also ==
- List of rivers of New Jersey
