= Jeremiah Woolsey House =

- U.S. National Register of Historic Places
- New Jersey Register of Historic Places
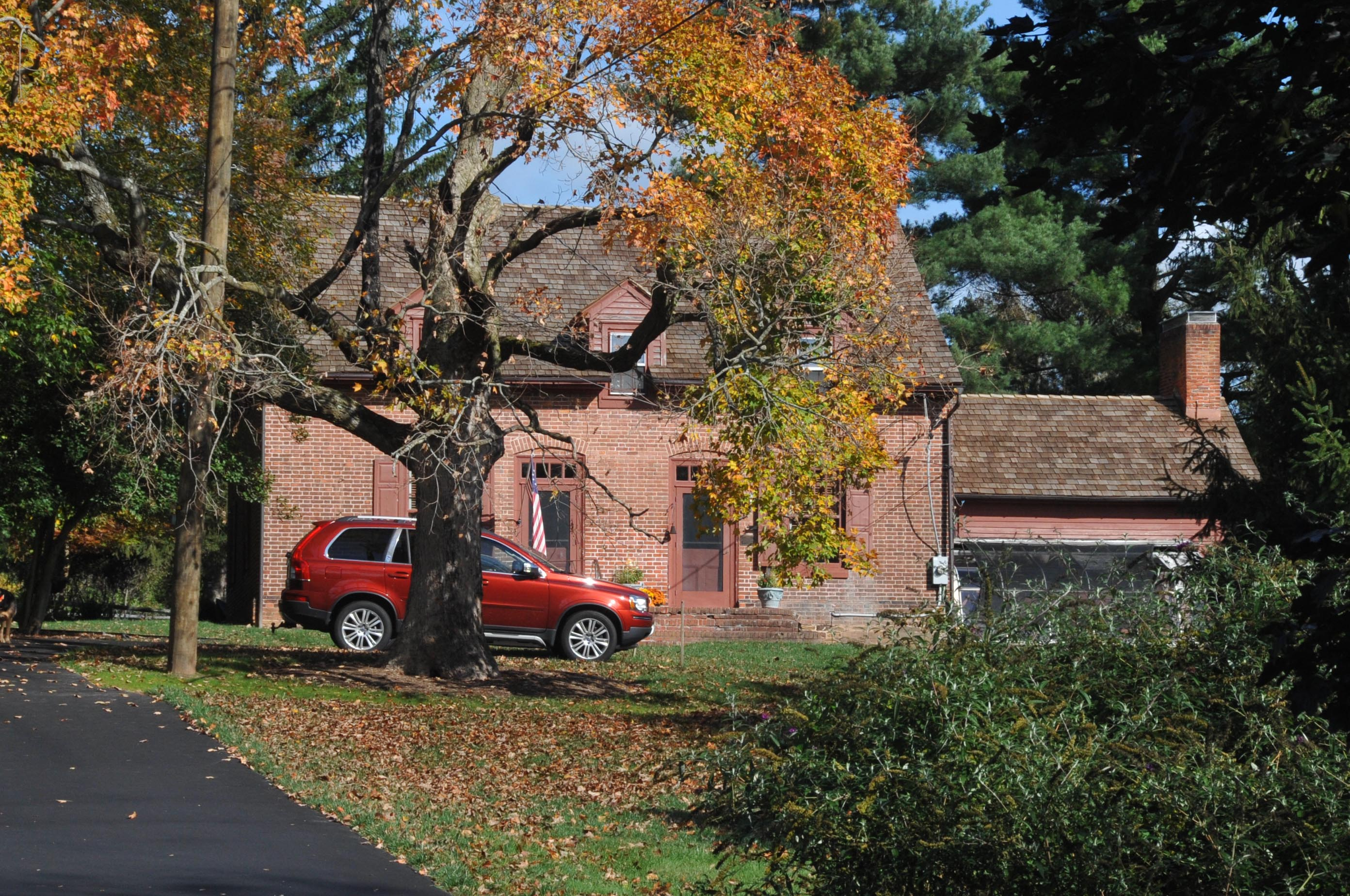

- Location within Mercer County, New Jersey Location within New Jersey Location within the United States
- Location: 237 Washington Crossing–Pennington Road, Titusville, New Jersey
- Coordinates: 40°18′33.8″N 74°49′33.4″W
- Area: 6.9 acres (2.8 ha)
- Built: 1765
- Architectural style: Dutch Colonial
- NRHP reference No.: 75001140
- NJRHP No.: 1708

Significant dates
- Added to NRHP: January 27, 1975
- Designated NJRHP: November 8, 1974

The Jeremiah Woolsey House is a historic Dutch Colonial home located at 237 Washington Crossing–Pennington Road (County Route 546), southwest of Pennington, in Hopewell Township of Mercer County, New Jersey. Listed as the Jeremiah M. Woolsey House, it was documented by the Historic American Buildings Survey in 1936. The house was added to the National Register of Historic Places on January 27, 1975, for its significance in architecture and politics/government.

== History ==
The house was built in 1765 and remained in the Woolsey family, who were very influential in township affairs, until 1929. During the American Revolution, Jeremiah Woolsey served as a commissioner to recruit men to serve in the Continental Army, service for which he received 37 Pounds Sterling in 1780 at the behest of George Washington. During the Battle of Trenton, his son, Ephraim, guided and marched with the army.

== See also ==
- National Register of Historic Places listings in Mercer County, New Jersey
- List of the oldest buildings in New Jersey
