= Bear Tavern, New Jersey =

Populated place in Mercer County, New Jersey, US

- Unincorporated community
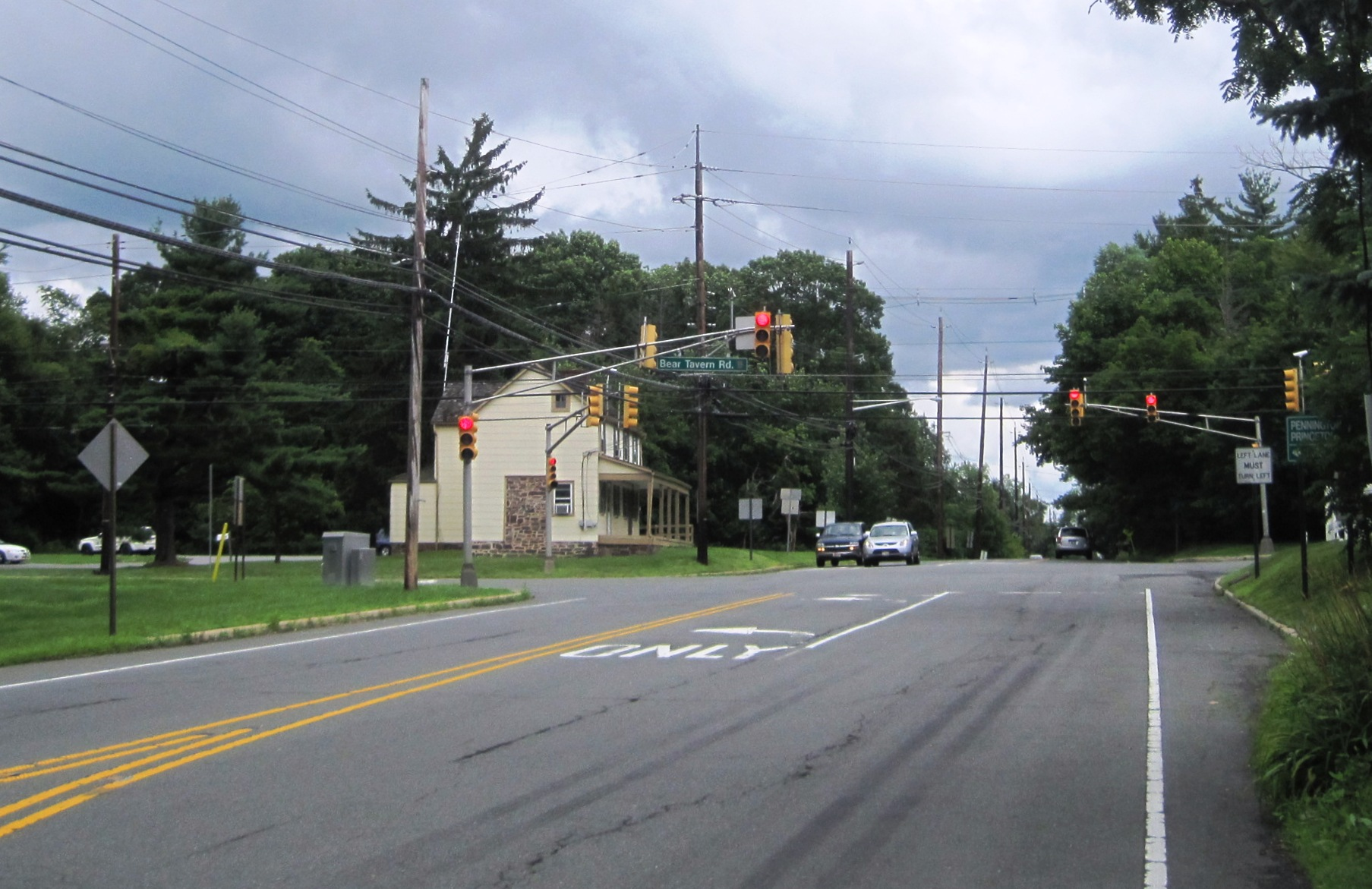
- Approaching the center of Bear Tavern from the west

- Location within Mercer County, New Jersey Location within New Jersey Location within the United States
- Coordinates: 40°18′32″N 74°50′55″W
- Country: United States
- State: New Jersey
- County: Mercer
- Township: Hopewell
- Elevation: 194 ft (59 m)
- GNIS feature ID: 874602

Bear Tavern is an unincorporated community located within Hopewell Township in Mercer County, in the U.S. state of New Jersey.

The settlement is named for a historic tavern, which was once located there and presently serves as a NJ State Park Police Headquarters for Washington Crossing State Park. During the American Revolutionary War, troops led by George Washington crossed the Delaware River at a location west of the settlement, then "trekked inland to the Bear Tavern and turned right, heading southeast toward Trenton".

The settlement today, is located at the corner of Washington Crossing Pennington Road and Bear Tavern Road. Washington Crossing State Park is located immediately to the northwest. Bear Tavern Elementary School is located south of the settlement.
