= Pleasant Valley, Mercer County, New Jersey =

Populated place in Mercer County, New Jersey, US

Pleasant Valley, New Jersey
- Unincorporated community
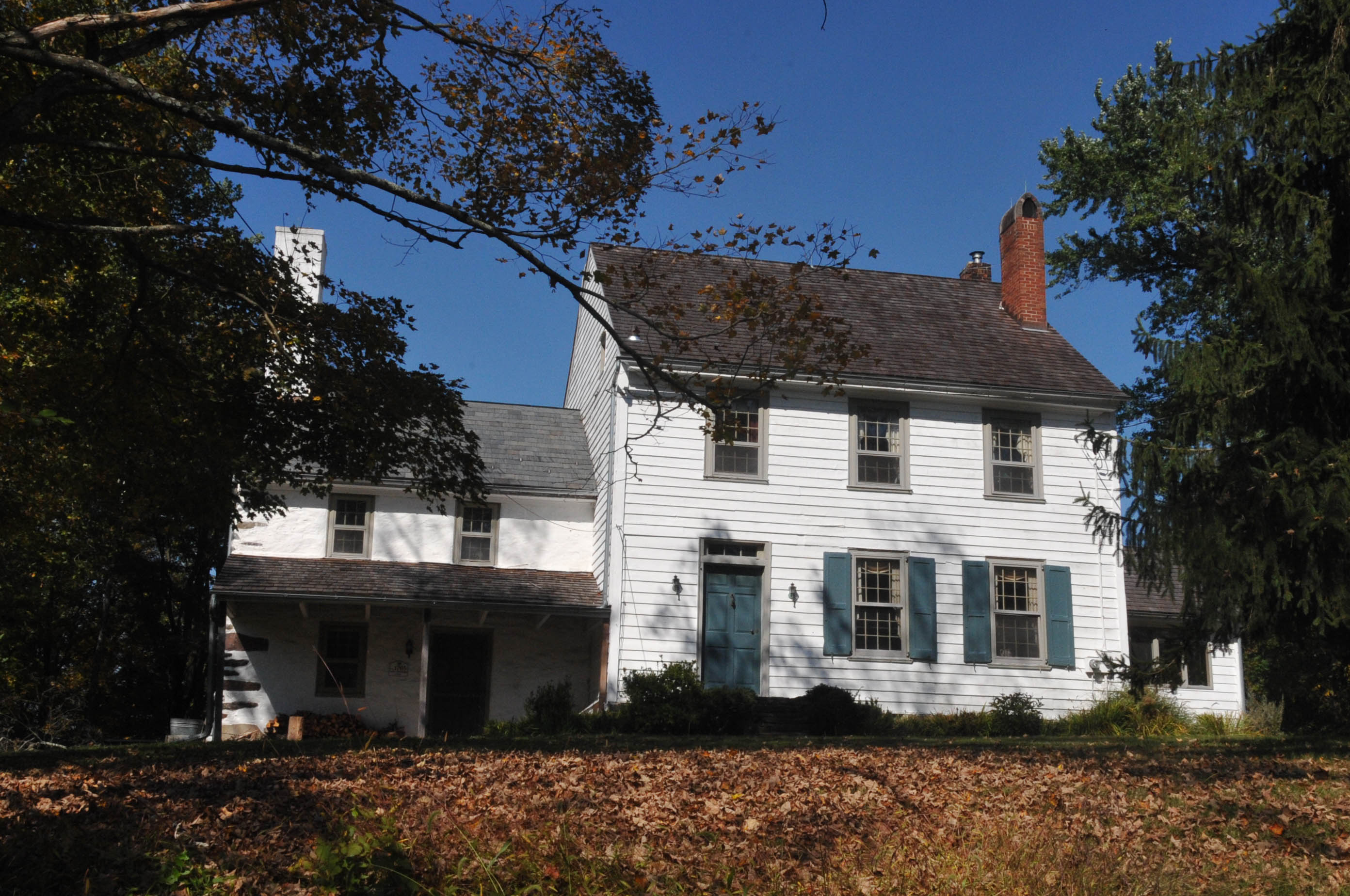
- Historic house in Pleasant Valley

- Location of Pleasant Valley in Mercer County Inset: Location of county within the state of New Jersey Pleasant Valley (New Jersey) Pleasant Valley (the United States)
- Coordinates: 40°20′11″N 74°53′46″W
- Country: United States
- State: New Jersey
- County: Mercer
- Township: Hopewell

Pleasant Valley is an unincorporated community located within Hopewell Township in Mercer County, in the U.S. state of New Jersey. The Howell Living History Farm, also known as the Joseph Phillips Farm, is located in the community.

== History ==
The community is located along the northern edge of a 30,000-acre (12,000 ha) plot bought by the governor of West Jersey, Daniel Coxe, in 1685. Joseph Phillips started his farm in 1732, and sold 125 acres (51 ha) to blacksmith John Phillips in 1737.

== Historic district ==
- Pleasant Valley Historic District
- U.S. National Register of Historic Places
- U.S. Historic district
- New Jersey Register of Historic Places
- Location: Hopewell Township, Mercer County, New Jersey
- Area: 1,565 acres (633 ha)
- Architectural style: Georgian, Vernacular Georgian
- NRHP reference No.: 91000676
- NJRHP No.: 1698

Significant dates
- Added to NRHP: June 14, 1991
- Designated NJRHP: April 12, 1991

The Pleasant Valley Historic District is a 1,565-acre (633 ha) historic district located along Pleasant Valley Road, Valley Road, Woodens Lane and Hunter Road in the community, and extending into West Amwell Township in Hunterdon County. The district was added to the National Register of Historic Places on June 14, 1991, for its significance in agriculture, architecture, and exploration/settlement. It includes 52 contributing buildings, 7 contributing structures, and 22 contributing sites. The individually listed Howell Living History Farm is central to the district.

== Education ==
All of Hopewell Township, including Pleasant Valley, is served by the Hopewell Valley Regional School District.

== See also ==
- National Register of Historic Places listings in Hunterdon County, New Jersey
- National Register of Historic Places listings in Mercer County, New Jersey
