= Marshalls Corner, New Jersey =

Populated place in Mercer County, New Jersey, US

- Unincorporated community
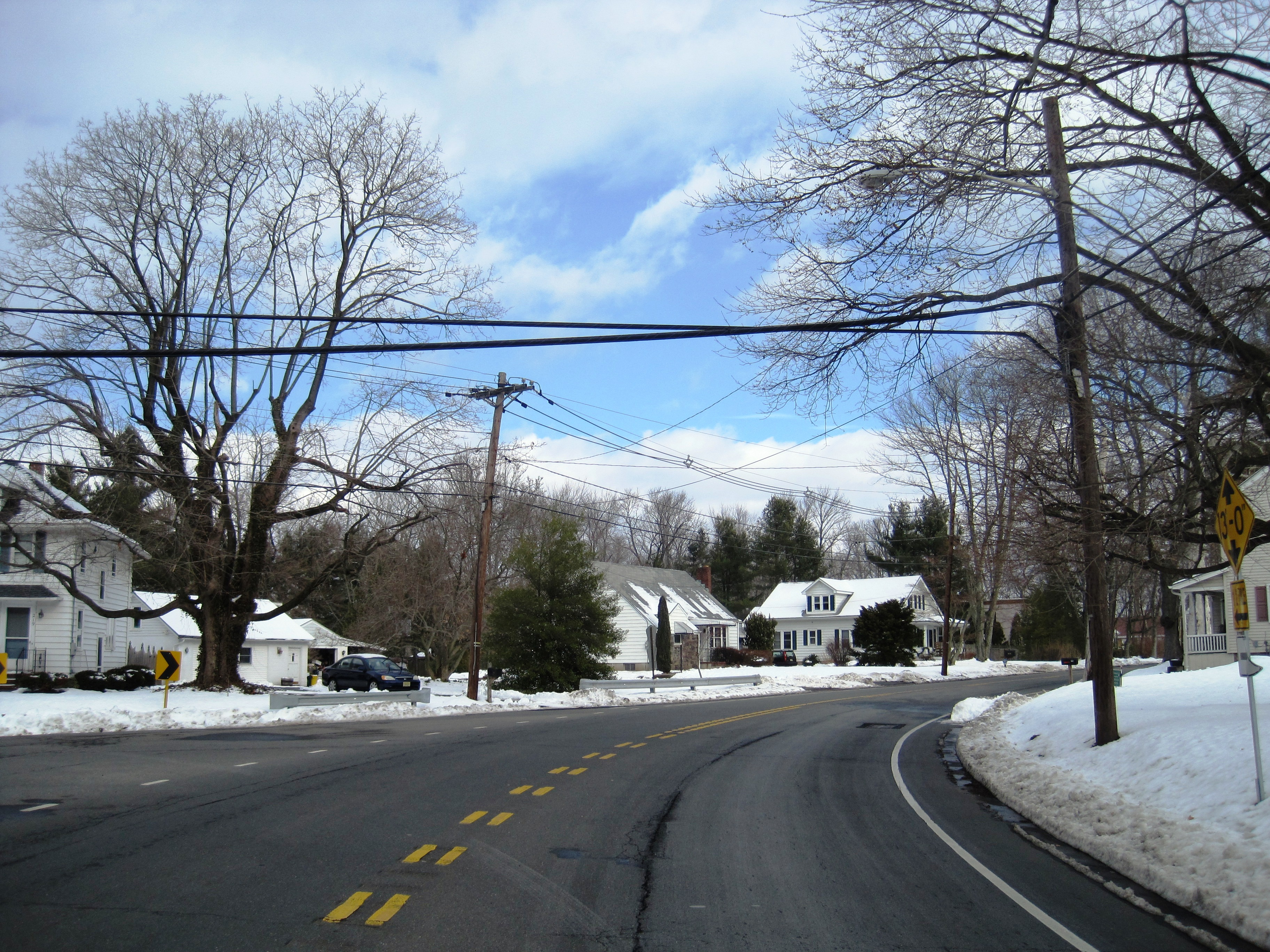
- Center of Marshalls Corner

- Location of Marshalls Corner in Mercer County Inset: Location of county within the state of New Jersey Marshalls Corner, New Jersey (New Jersey) Marshalls Corner, New Jersey (the United States)
- Coordinates: 40°21′41″N 74°47′46″W
- Country: United States
- State: New Jersey
- County: Mercer
- Township: Hopewell
- Elevation: 223 ft (68 m)
- GNIS feature ID: 878147

Marshalls Corner is an unincorporated community located within Hopewell Township in Mercer County, in the U.S. state of New Jersey and is centered about the intersection of Pennington-Hopewell Road (County Route 654) and Woodsville-Marshalls Corner Road (CR 612). The community has many residences, a Kooltronic manufacturing facility, and is the site of the vacant Pennytown Shopping Center. The proposed redevelopment of Pennytown as a housing complex is controversial to residents due to concerns about increased traffic and site drainage.

== History ==
The settlement was established at the intersection of two Indian paths which became public byways during the Colonial period. The Furman family were early settlers who came west from Long Island, and established a farm here. The settlement became known as "Furman's Corner", and on a 1722 survey of a road being built from Ringoes to this area, the surveyor wrote: "Thence along a line of Marked trees as aforesaid to a Hickory tree standing near Samuel furmans Corner".

A schoolhouse was erected in 1720, and was used for about 100 years. It was replaced by a new school – later called Marshalls Corner School House – which opened in 1825, and remained in used until 1930, after which it became a den for the local Lions Club.

In June 1778, during the American Revolutionary War, the entire Continental Army halted at Furman's Corner during its march from Valley Forge, because their general, Charles Lee, had previously identified this as an advantageous site for a battle. The army of 12,000 waited here several hours, and then left at night after learning the British had moved in a different direction.

The settlement became known as "Marshalls Corner", after William Marshall opened a general store here around 1820. From 1830 to 1886, William Marshall represented the district in the New Jersey Legislature. William Marshall's nephew, James W. Marshall, was born in Marshalls Corner, and is noted for starting the California Gold Rush after discovering a gold nugget at Sutter's Mill.

In addition to a store and school, the early settlement had a blacksmith shop and a wheelwright.

The settlement was described in 2010 as "primarily comprised of frame dwellings and their modest outbuildings, dating from the mid-1800’s to early twentieth century".

== Education ==
All of Hopewell Township, including Marshalls Corner, is served by the Hopewell Valley Regional School District.
