= Marion Township, New Jersey =

Former New Jersey Settlement

Coordinates: 39.437°N 75.282°W

Marion was a township that existed in Mercer County, New Jersey, United States, from 1838 to 1839.

Marion was incorporated as a township by an Act of the New Jersey Legislature on February 22, 1838, from portions of Hopewell Township. On February 14, 1839, shortly before the first anniversary of its creation, the township was reabsorbed back into Hopewell Township.
