= Howell Living History Farm =

- U.S. National Register of Historic Places
- U.S. Historic district
- U.S. Historic district – Contributing property
- New Jersey Register of Historic Places
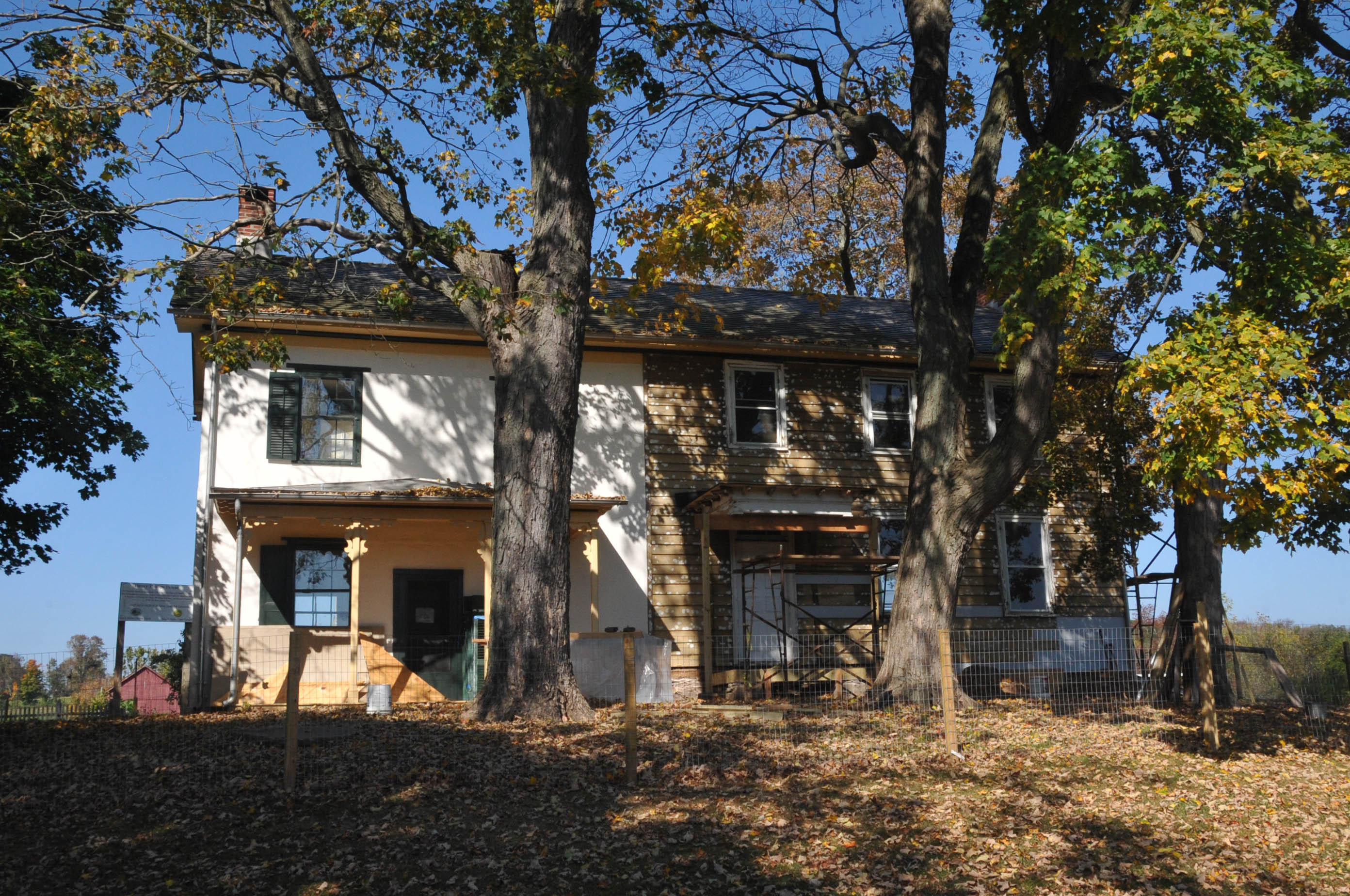

- Location within Mercer County, New Jersey Location within New Jersey Location within the United States
- Location: 70 Woodens Lane; Hopewell Township, New Jersey
- Nearest city: Titusville, New Jersey
- Coordinates: 40°20′23″N 74°53′56″W
- Area: 130 acres (53 ha)
- Built: 1732
- Part of: Pleasant Valley Historic District (ID91000676)
- NRHP reference No.: 77000879
- NJRHP No.: 1697

Significant dates
- Added to NRHP: May 2, 1977
- Designated CP: June 14, 1991
- Designated NJRHP: December 1, 1976

The Howell Living History Farm, also known as the Joseph Phillips Farm, is a 130-acre (53 ha) living open-air museum located north of Titusville in the Pleasant Valley section of Hopewell Township in Mercer County, New Jersey. The farm was added to the National Register of Historic Places on May 2, 1977, for its significance in agriculture and architecture. The farm was included in the Pleasant Valley Historic District on June 14, 1991.

== History and description ==
The farm was first created by Joseph Phillips, a blacksmith, who purchased 125 acres (51 ha) from William Bryant in 1732. By 1800, Henry Phillips, Joseph's son, had enlarged the farm by 100 acres (40 ha). Henry served as a captain in the Hunterdon County Regiment of the Continental Army during the American Revolution. An inventory of the farm on his death in 1805 listed two teams of oxen, two slaves, a Rockingham colt, and the flax in the ground. The current buildings on the property date to the 19th century, primarily before the American Civil War. The final private owner of the farm was the Howell family, who donated the land to Mercer County in 1974 for use as a museum.

The museum shows farm life from the year 1900. The farm is owned by Mercer County and operated by the Mercer County Park Commission with the support and assistance of The Friends of Howell Living History Farm.

== See also ==
- National Register of Historic Places listings in Mercer County, New Jersey
- Allaire Village, a similar living history museum located in Howell / Wall townships
