= Harbourton, New Jersey =

Populated place in Mercer County, New Jersey, US

- Unincorporated community
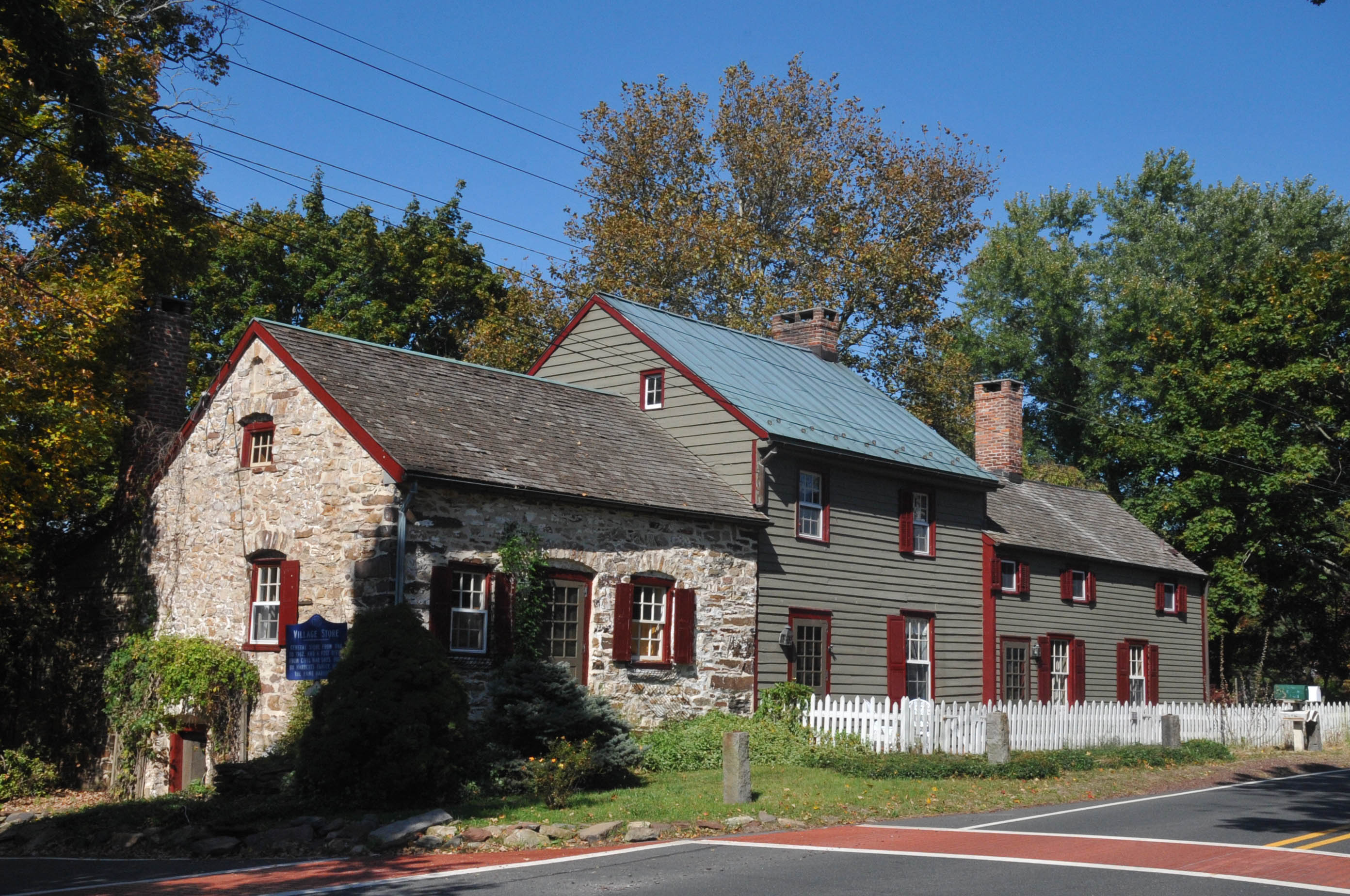
- Old village store in Harbourton.

- Location within Mercer County, New Jersey Location within New Jersey Location within the United States
- Coordinates: 40°21′08″N 74°51′08″W
- Country: United States
- State: New Jersey
- County: Mercer
- Township: Hopewell
- Elevation: 331 ft (101 m)
- GNIS feature ID: 876941

Harbourton is an unincorporated community located within Hopewell Township in Mercer County, in the U.S. state of New Jersey. It is located on County Route 579 at the intersection with Harbourton-Mount Airy Road. The Harbourton Historic District, encompassing the community, was listed on the state and national registers of historic places in 1974.

== Historic district ==
- Harbourton Historic District
- U.S. National Register of Historic Places
- U.S. Historic district
- New Jersey Register of Historic Places
- Location: Junction of Harbourton/Rocktown and Harbourton/Mt. Airy Roads
- Area: 7 acres (2.8 ha)
- Architectural style: Carpenter Gothic
- NRHP reference No.: 74001167
- NJRHP No.: 1683

Significant dates
- Added to NRHP: December 31, 1974
- Designated NJRHP: October 25, 1974

The Harbourton Historic District is a 7-acre (2.8 ha) historic district encompassing the community around the junction of Harbourton/Rocktown and Harbourton/Mt. Airy Roads. It was added to the National Register of Historic Places on December 31, 1974 for its significance in agriculture, architecture, and commerce. The district includes seven contributing buildings. The oldest section of the village store was built in 1768, and operated as a store until 1962. It is now a private residence. The Baptist Church features Carpenter Gothic architecture.

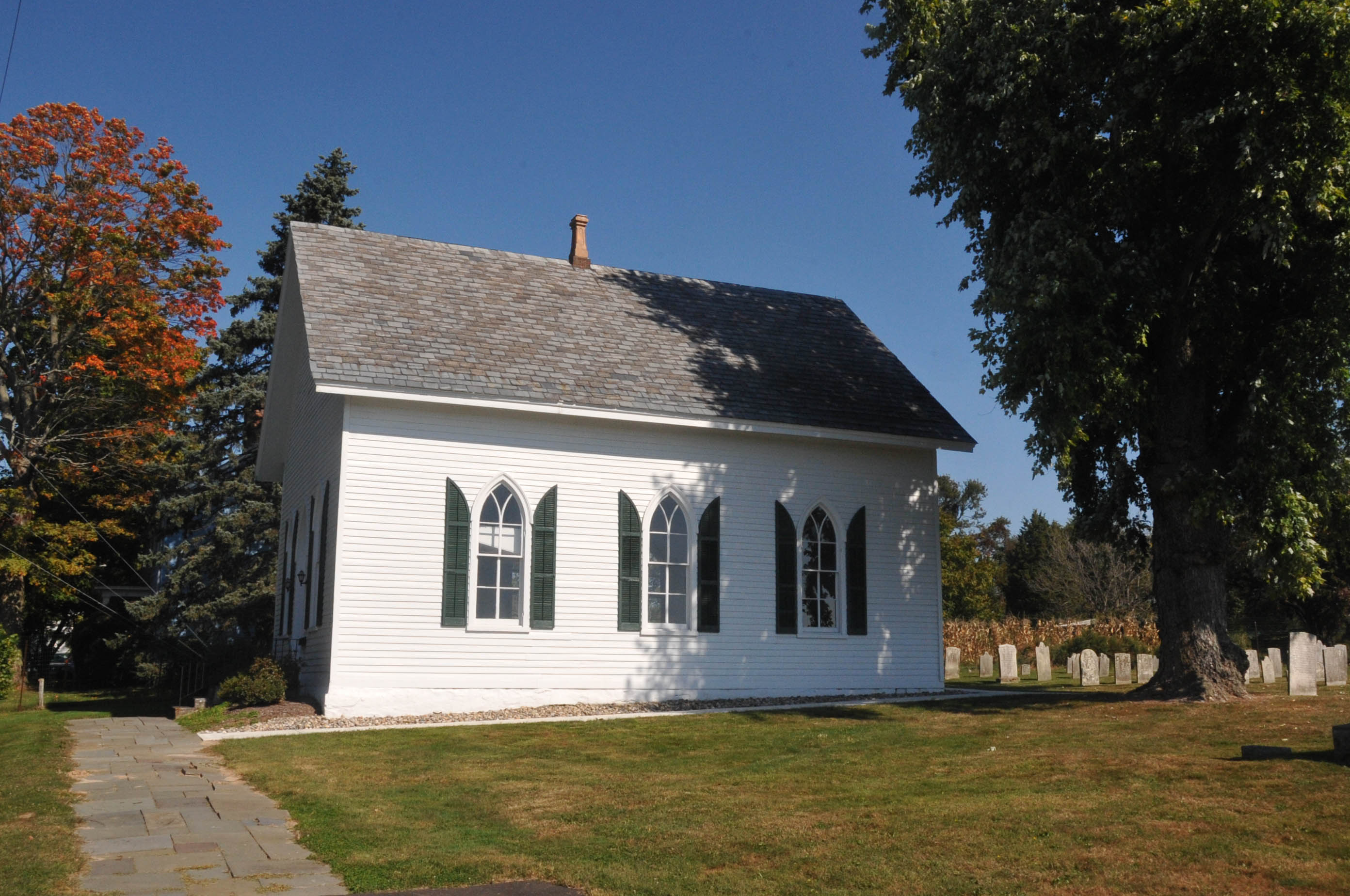
Baptist Church

== Education ==
All of Hopewell Township, including Harbourton, is served by the Hopewell Valley Regional School District.

== See also ==
- National Register of Historic Places listings in Mercer County, New Jersey
