= Hopewell Township, Mercer County, New Jersey =

Township in the United States

Hopewell Township, New Jersey
- Township
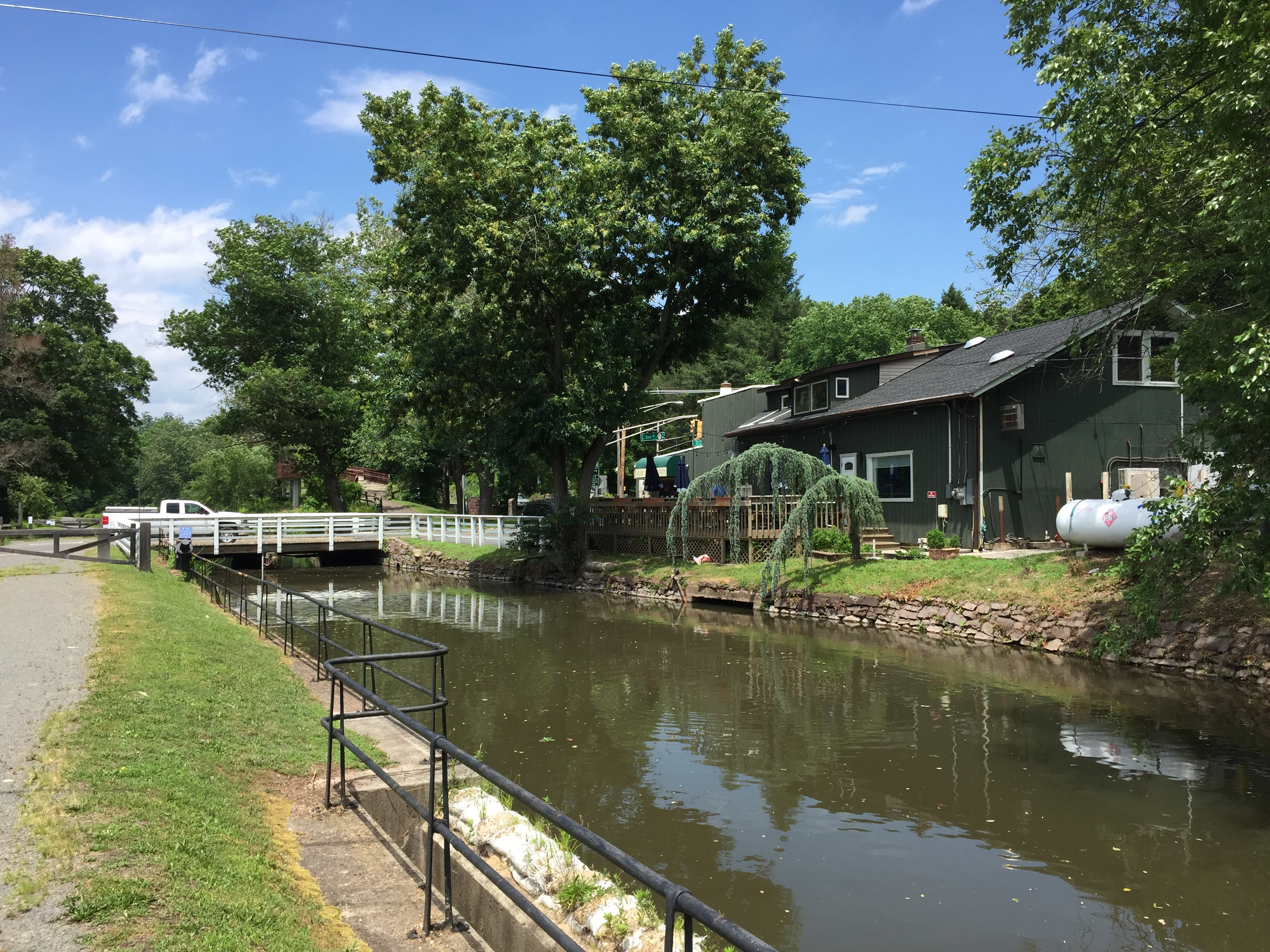
- The Delaware and Raritan Canal at Washington Crossing in Hopewell Township

- Seal

- Location of Hopewell Township in Mercer County highlighted in red (right). Inset map: Location of Mercer County in New Jersey highlighted in orange (left).

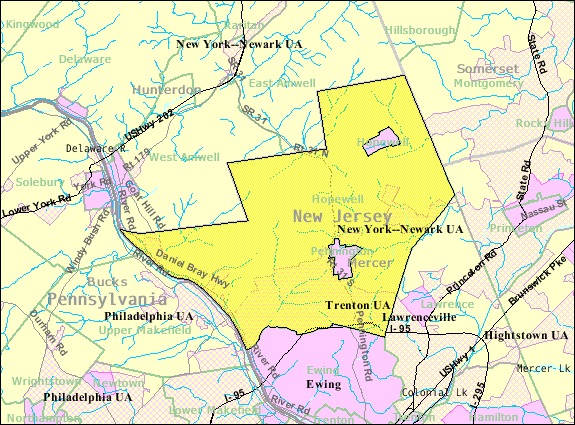
- Census Bureau map of Hopewell Township, Mercer County, New Jersey
- Interactive map of Hopewell Township, New Jersey
- Location in Mercer County Location in New Jersey Location in the United States
- Coordinates: 40.356362°N 74.812002°W
- Country: United States
- State: New Jersey
- County: Mercer
- Founded: February 20, 1700
- Royal charter: March 1, 1755
- Incorporated: February 21, 1798

Government
  - Type: Township
  - Body: Township Committee
  - Mayor: Courtney Peters-Manning (D, term ends December 31, 2024)
  - Administrator: George Snyder
  - Municipal clerk: Katherine Fenton-Newman

Area
  - Total: 58.95 sq mi (152.67 km^{2})
  - Land: 58.07 sq mi (150.40 km^{2})
  - Water: 0.87 sq mi (2.26 km^{2}) 1.48%
  - Rank: 22nd of 565 in state 1st of 12 in county
- Elevation: 217 ft (66 m)

Population (2020)
  - Total: 17,491
  - Estimate (2023): 17,383
  - Rank: 152nd of 565 in state 8th of 12 in county
  - Density: 301.2/sq mi (116.3/km^{2})
  - Rank: 473rd of 565 in state 12th of 12 in county
- Time zone: UTC−05:00 (EST)
  - Summer (DST): UTC−04:00 (EDT)
- ZIP Code: 08560 – Titusville
- Area code: 609 exchanges: 730, 737, 18
- FIPS code: 3402133180
- GNIS feature ID: 0882129
- Website: www.hopewelltwp.org

Hopewell Township is a township in Mercer County, in the U.S. state of New Jersey. Located at the cross-roads between the Delaware Valley region to the southwest and the Raritan Valley region to the northeast, the township considered an exurb of New York City in the New York metropolitan area as defined by the United States Census Bureau, while also directly bordering the Philadelphia metropolitan area, being a part of the Federal Communications Commission's Philadelphia Designated Market Area. As of the 2020 United States census, the township's population was 17,491, its highest decennial count ever and an increase of 187 (+1.1%) from the 2010 census count of 17,304, which in turn reflected an increase of 1,199 (+7.4%) from the 16,105 counted in the 2000 census.

The township dates back to February 20, 1700, when the area was still part of Burlington County. One of the earliest European settlers before 1710 was George Woolsey, formerly of Jamaica, Queens (in present-day New York City), whose father was one of the earliest pre-1650 settlers of what was New Amsterdam. His descendants maintained the family farm for over 200 years.

The township was formerly the name for one of two portions of 800 acres (3.2 km^{2}) of land purchased in 1714 by William Trent, and was formally set off to Hunterdon County, when that county was created on March 11, 1714. Trenton Township was formed out of this estate on June 3, 1719, later to become the City of Trenton. Hopewell Township was incorporated by Royal charter on March 1, 1755, and was re-incorporated by an act of the New Jersey Legislature on February 21, 1798, as one of the state's initial group of 104 townships. Hopewell Township became part of Mercer County at its creation on February 22, 1838. Portions of the township were taken to form Marion Township (February 22, 1838, reverted to Hopewell Township on February 14, 1839), the Borough of Pennington (January 31, 1890) and Hopewell Borough (April 14, 1891), with additional portions of the township transferred to both Pennington and Hopewell Borough in 1915.

== History ==
Hopewell Township includes the location (now known as Washington Crossing) along the east side of the Delaware River to which George Washington and the Continental Army crossed from Pennsylvania. Once in Hopewell Township, the army marched to Trenton on December 26, 1776. The Battle of Trenton followed. Today, Washington Crossing State Park commemorates this important milestone in American history.

Hopewell Township was also the location where—two months after being abducted from his home in neighboring East Amwell—the body of Charles Lindbergh Jr. was discovered on May 12, 1932.

In May 2023, a home in the township had its roof pierced by a stony chondrite meteorite weighing 986 grams (34.8 oz). After analysis, it was found to be one of 1,100 known meteorites with an unusually low iron content.

== Geography ==
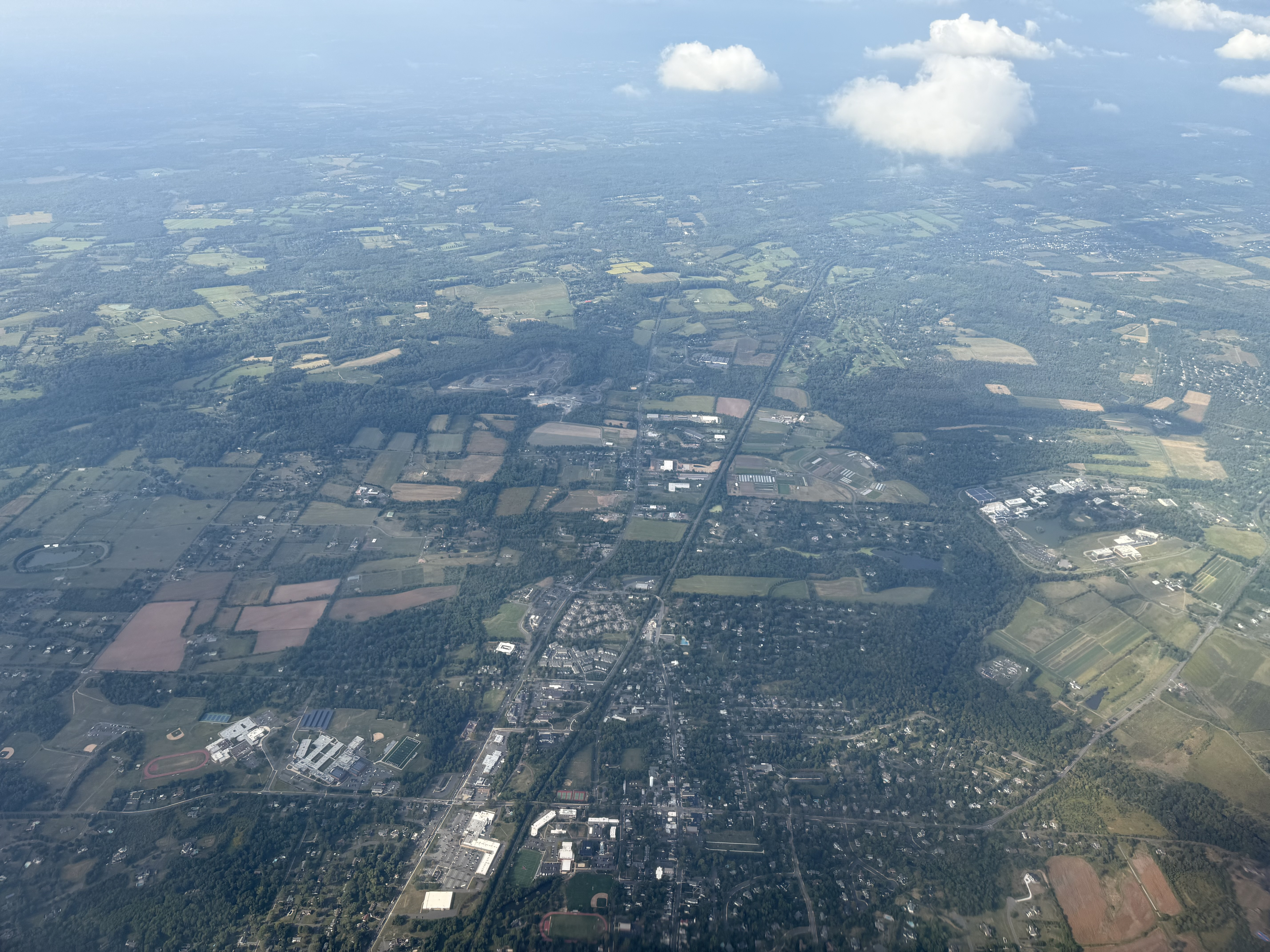
Aerial view of central Hopewell Township; the northern portion of Pennington Borough, an enclave within the township, is in the foreground

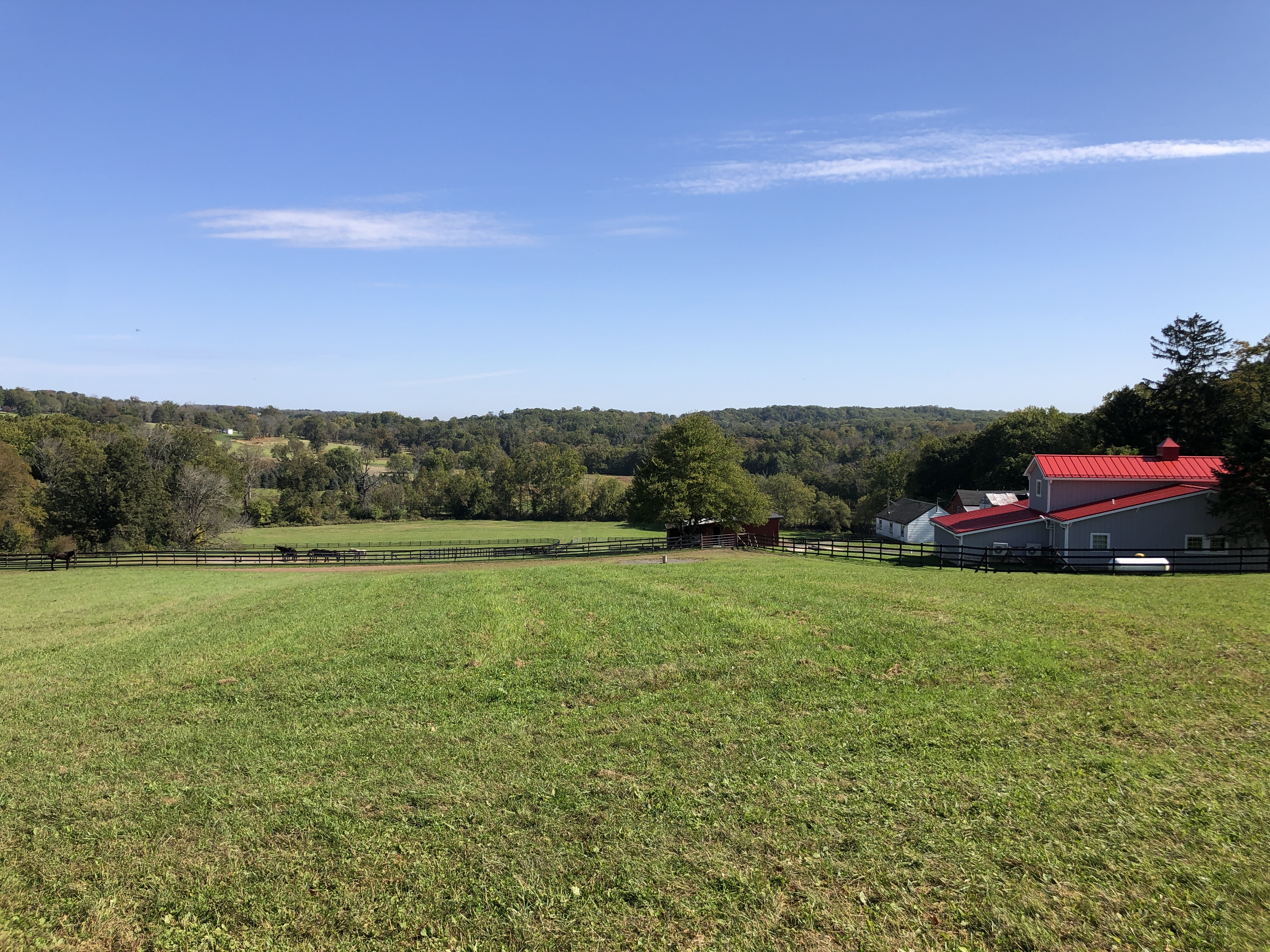
Rolling hills, forests and horse pasture in the northern portion of Hopewell Township, characterizing its mostly rural nature

According to the United States Census Bureau, the township had a total area of 58.95 square miles (152.67 km^{2}), including 58.07 square miles (150.40 km^{2}) of land and 0.87 square miles (2.26 km^{2}) of water (1.48%).

The topography of the township is one of rolling hills, with The Sourlands encompassing the northern and western portions of the township and flatter terrain further southeast. Baldpate Mountain, in the western part of the township, is the highest hill, at 480 feet (150 m) above sea level. The lowest elevation is between 20 and 40 feet, located where Jacobs Creek joins the Delaware River in the southwestern corner of the township.

The township completely surrounds Hopewell Borough and Pennington, making it part of two of the 21 pairs of "doughnut towns" in the state, where one municipality entirely surrounds another, and the only municipality that surrounds two others. The township borders Ewing Township, Lawrence Township and Princeton in Mercer County; East Amwell Township and West Amwell Township in Hunterdon County; Montgomery Township in Somerset County; and Solebury Township and Upper Makesfield Township in Bucks County, Pennsylvania, across the Delaware River.

Ackors Corner, Baldwins Corner, Bear Tavern, Centerville, Coopers Corner, Federal City, Glenmoore, Harbourton, Harts Corner, Marshalls Corner, Moore, Mount Rose, Pleasant Valley, Stoutsburg, Titusville, Washington Crossing and Woodsville are unincorporated communities, localities and place names located within Hopewell Township. Some neighborhoods in the township include Hopewell Hunt, Brandon Farms and Elm Ridge.

== Demographics ==
Historical population
Census	Pop.	Note	%±
1790	2,320		—
1810	2,565		—
1820	2,881		12.3%
1830	3,154		9.5%
1840	3,205		1.6%
1850	3,698		15.4%
1860	3,900		5.5%
1870	4,276		9.6%
1880	4,462		4.3%
1890	4,338		−2.8%
1900	3,360	*	−22.5%
1910	3,171	*	−5.6%
1920	3,249		2.5%
1930	3,907		20.3%
1940	3,738		−4.3%
1950	4,731		26.6%
1960	7,818		65.3%
1970	10,030		28.3%
1980	10,893		8.6%
1990	11,590		6.4%
2000	16,105		39.0%
2010	17,304		7.4%
2020	17,491		1.1%
2023 (est.)	17,383		−0.6%
Population sources: 1790–1920 1840 1850–1870; 1850 1870 1880–1890; 1890–1910 1910–1930; 1940–2000 2000; 2010 2020 * = Lost territory in previous decade

=== 2010 census ===
The 2010 United States census counted 17,304 people, 6,282 households, and 4,925 families in the township. The population density was 298.2 inhabitants per square mile (115.1/km^{2}). There were 6,551 housing units at an average density of 112.9 per square mile (43.6/km^{2}). The racial makeup was 86.74% (15,010) White, 2.10% (364) Black or African American, 0.07% (12) Native American, 8.89% (1,539) Asian, 0.01% (1) Pacific Islander, 0.52% (90) from other races, and 1.66% (288) from two or more races. Hispanic or Latino of any race were 3.31% (573) of the population.

Of the 6,282 households, 39.0% had children under the age of 18; 69.1% were married couples living together; 6.6% had a female householder with no husband present and 21.6% were non-families. Of all households, 17.8% were made up of individuals and 7.9% had someone living alone who was 65 years of age or older. The average household size was 2.75 and the average family size was 3.14.

26.4% of the population were under the age of 18, 5.0% from 18 to 24, 19.8% from 25 to 44, 34.6% from 45 to 64, and 14.2% who were 65 years of age or older. The median age was 44.4 years. For every 100 females, the population had 96.7 males. For every 100 females ages 18 and older there were 93.4 males.

The Census Bureau's 2006–2010 American Community Survey showed that (in 2010 inflation-adjusted dollars) median household income was $132,813 (with a margin of error of ±$15,634) and the median family income was $151,394 (±$9,062). Males had a median income of $106,431 (±$9,830) versus $66,285 (±$11,820) for females. The per capita income for the borough was $55,219 (±$3,466). About 0.6% of families and 1.7% of the population were below the poverty line, including 1.9% of those under age 18 and 1.3% of those age 65 or over.

=== 2000 census ===
As of the 2000 United States census there were 16,105 people, 5,498 households, and 4,431 families residing in the township. The population density was 277.1 inhabitants per square mile (107.0/km^{2}). There were 5,629 housing units at an average density of 96.9 per square mile (37.4/km^{2}). The racial makeup of the township was 77.30% White, 15.83% African American, 0.12% Native American, 3.97% Asian, 0.02% Pacific Islander, 0.66% from other races, and 1.09% from two or more races. Hispanic or Latino of any race were 2.45% of the population.

There were 5,498 households, out of which 40.6% had children under the age of 18 living with them, 71.6% were married couples living together, 6.8% had a female householder with no husband present, and 19.4% were non-families. 16.0% of all households were made up of individuals, and 6.5% had someone living alone who was 65 years of age or older. The average household size was 2.77 and the average family size was 3.11.

In the township the population was spread out, with 26.5% under the age of 18, 5.4% from 18 to 24, 29.9% from 25 to 44, 26.8% from 45 to 64, and 11.5% who were 65 years of age or older. The median age was 39 years. For every 100 females, there were 103.9 males. For every 100 females age 18 and over, there were 104.3 males.

The median income for a household in the township was $93,640, and the median income for a family was $101,579. Males had a median income of $66,849 versus $47,701 for females. The per capita income for the township was $43,947. About 0.9% of families and 1.1% of the population were below the poverty line, including 1.5% of those under age 18 and none of those age 65 or over.

== Parks and recreation ==
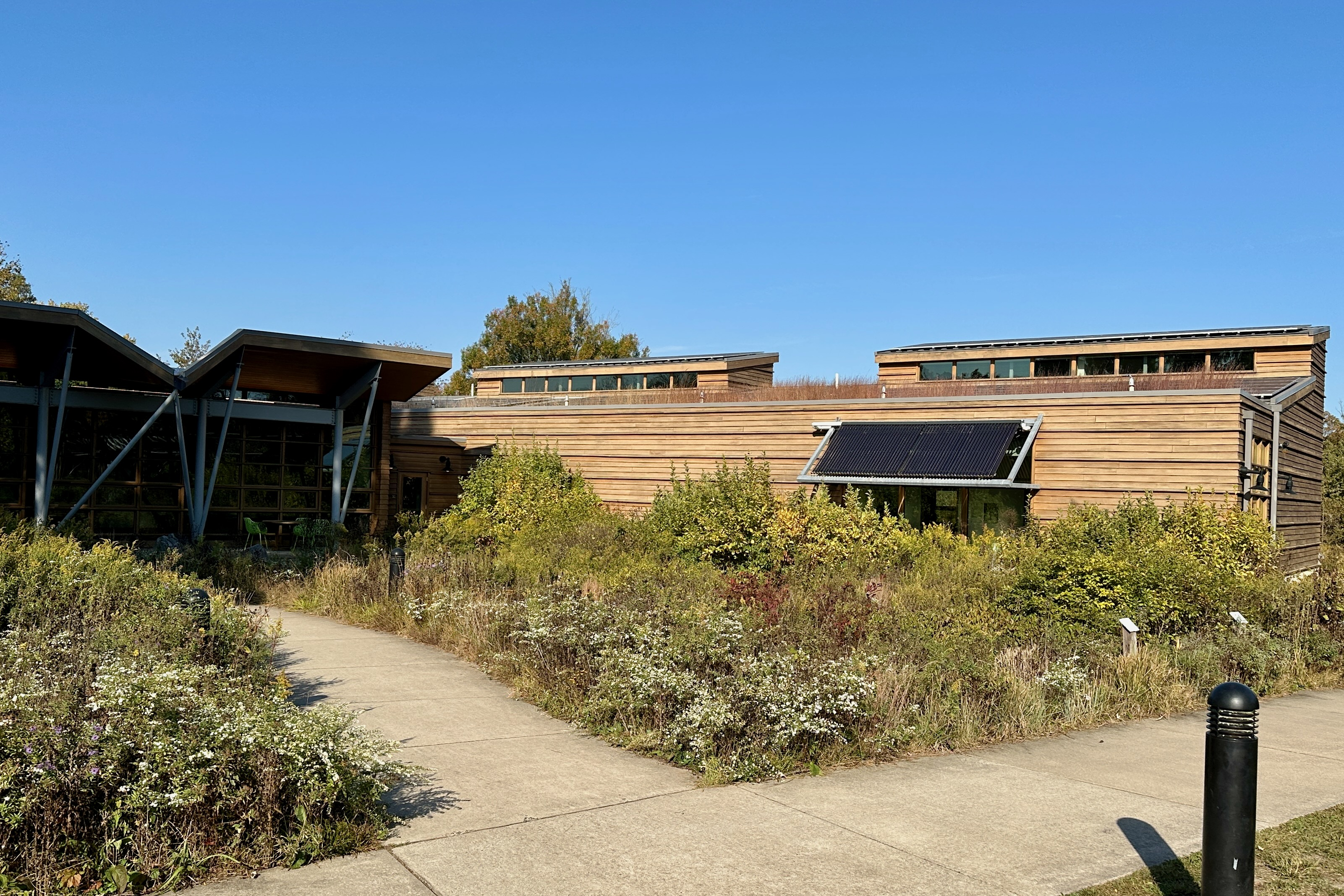
The Watershed Institute

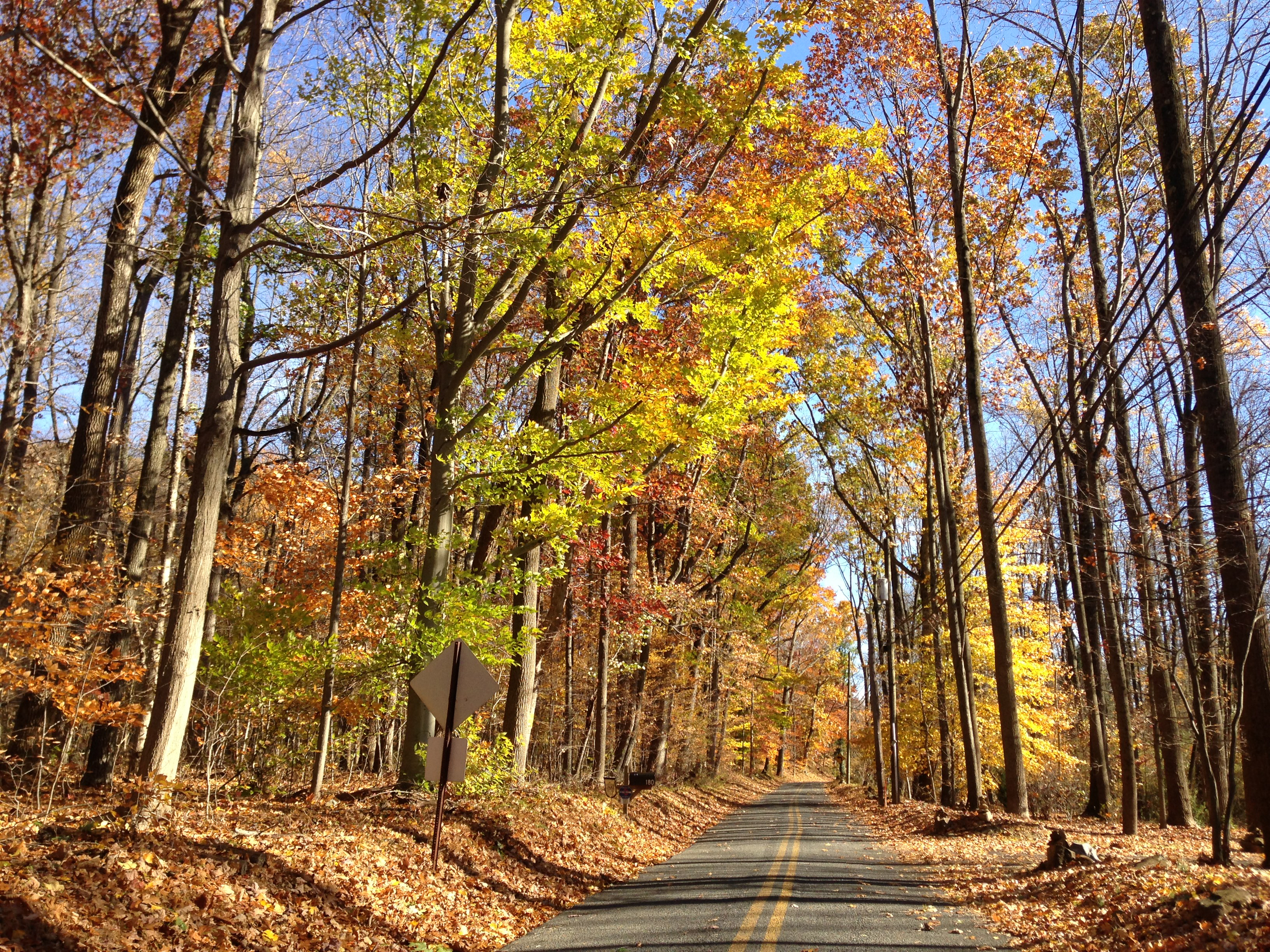
Woosamonsa Road in Hopewell during autumn

- Stony Brook-Millstone Watershed Association
- Washington Crossing State Park is a state park covering 3,575 acres (1,447 ha) in portions of both Hunterdon County and Mercer County that commemorates "one of the pivotal events of the American Revolution."
- St. Michaels Farm Preserve, which was first preserved in 2010, is a 400-acre (160 ha) area of farm fields and forested land.
- Woolsey Park

== Government ==
=== Local government ===
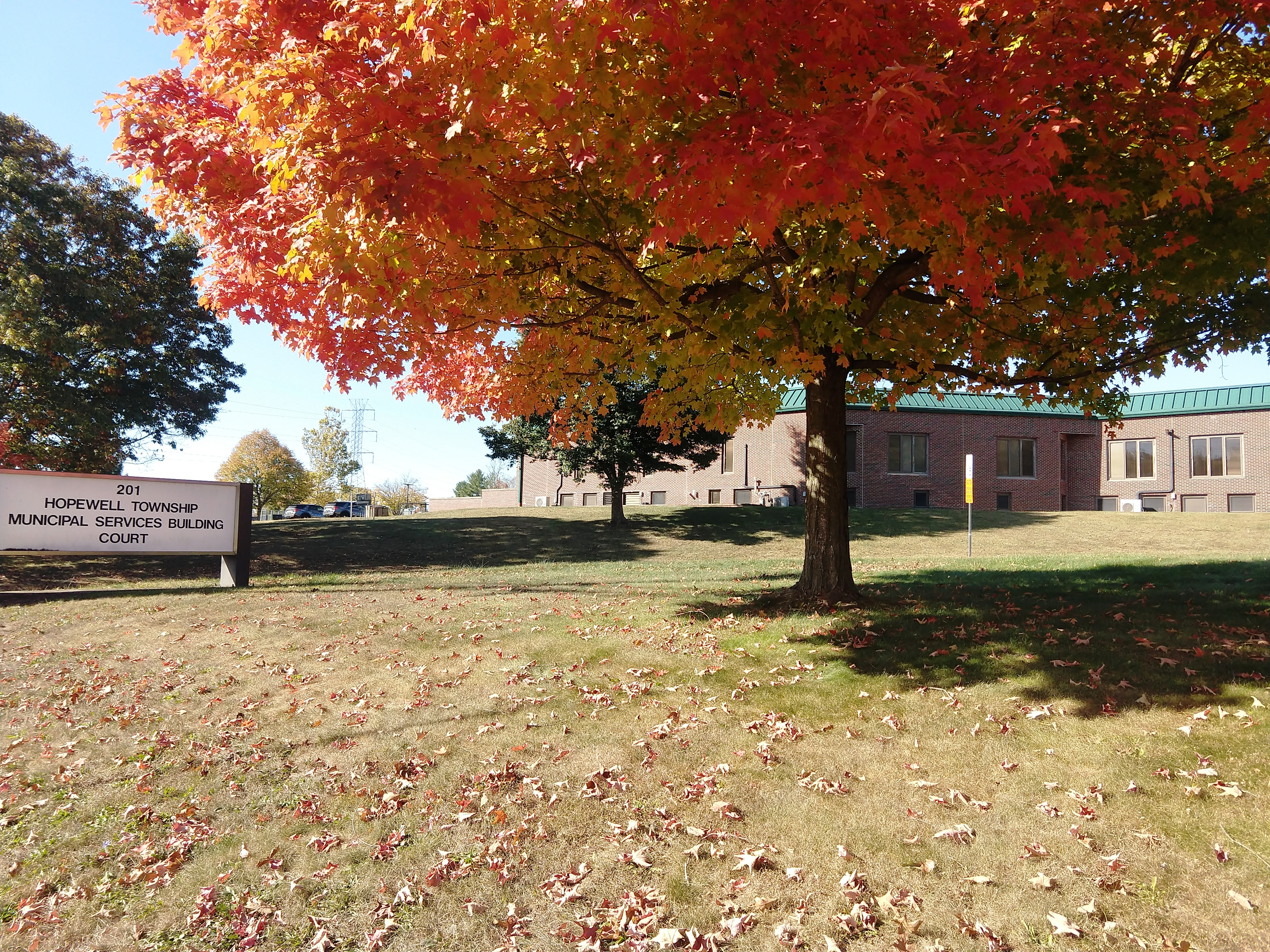
Hopewell Township Municipal Building

Hopewell Township is governed under the Township form of government, one of 141 municipalities (of the 564) statewide governed under this form. The Township Committee is comprised of five members, who are elected directly by the voters at-large in partisan elections to serve three-year terms of office on a staggered basis, with either one or two seats coming up for election each year as part of the November general election in a three-year cycle. At an annual reorganization meeting, the Township Committee selects one of its members to serve as Mayor.

As of 2024, the members of the Hopewell Township Committee are Mayor Courtney Peters-Manning (D, term on committee ends December 31, 2025; term as mayor ends 2024), Deputy Mayor Urmila "Uma" Purandare (D, term on committee and as Deputy Mayor ends 2024), David Chait (D, 2025), Kevin D. Kuchinski (D, 2026) and Michael Ruger (D, 2026).

In December 2022, David Chait was selected from a list of three prospective candidates nominated by the Democratic municipal committee to fill the seat expiring in December 2022 that had been held by Kristin McLaughlin until she left office to take a seat in the Mercer County Board of County Commissioners.

Citing differences with local party leadership, Mayor Harvey Lester changed his party affiliation in March 2015 from Democrat to Republican. In the November 2015 general election, Democrat Julie Blake defeated incumbent Mayor Harvey Lester, with affordable housing, development and taxes as key issues in the race.

Hopewell Township is served by the New Jersey Agricultural Experiment Station & Rutgers Cooperative Extension of Mercer County, located in Trenton.

=== Federal, state and county representation ===
Hopewell Township is located in the 12th Congressional District and is part of New Jersey's 15th state legislative district.

For the 119th United States Congress, New Jersey's 12th congressional district is represented by Bonnie Watson Coleman (D, Ewing Township). New Jersey is represented in the United States Senate by Democrats Cory Booker (Newark, term ends 2027) and Andy Kim (Moorestown, term ends 2031).

For the 2026–2027 session, the 15th legislative district of the New Jersey Legislature is represented in the State Senate by Shirley Turner (D, Lawrence Township) and in the General Assembly by Verlina Reynolds-Jackson (D, Trenton) and Anthony Verrelli (D, Hopewell Township).

Mercer County is governed by a County Executive who oversees the day-to-day operations of the county and by a seven-member Board of County Commissioners that acts in a legislative capacity, setting policy. All officials are chosen at-large in partisan elections, with the executive serving a four-year term of office while the commissioners serve three-year terms of office on a staggered basis, with either two or three seats up for election each year as part of the November general election. As of 2025, the County Executive is Daniel R. Benson (D, Hamilton Township) whose term of office ends December 31, 2027. Mercer County's Commissioners are:

Lucylle R. S. Walter (D, Ewing Township, 2026), Chair John A. Cimino (D, Hamilton Township, 2026), Samuel T. Frisby Sr. (D, Trenton, 2027), Cathleen M. Lewis (D, Lawrence Township, 2025), Vice Chair Kristin L. McLaughlin (D, Hopewell Township, 2027), Nina D. Melker (D, Hamilton Township, 2025) and Terrance Stokes (D, Ewing Township, 2027).

Mercer County's constitutional officers are: Clerk Paula Sollami-Covello (D, Lawrence Township, 2025), Sheriff John A. Kemler (D, Hamilton Township, 2026) and Surrogate Diane Gerofsky (D, Lawrence Township, 2026).

=== Politics ===
As of March 2011, there were a total of 12,218 registered voters in Hopewell Township, of which 3,949 (32.3%) were registered as Democrats, 3,088 (25.3%) were registered as Republicans and 5,178 (42.4%) were registered as Unaffiliated. There were 3 voters registered as Libertarians or Greens.

United States presidential election results for Hopewell Township
Year	Republican		Democratic		Third party(ies)	
Year	No.	%	No.	%	No.	%
2024	3,387	32.16%	6,926	65.77%	218	2.07%
2020	3,387	30.77%	7,419	67.40%	201	1.83%
2016	3,405	34.31%	6,049	60.96%	469	4.73%
2012	4,171	43.83%	5,223	54.88%	123	1.29%
2008	4,042	41.70%	5,517	56.92%	133	1.37%
2004	4,476	46.97%	4,974	52.19%	80	0.84%

In the 2012 presidential election, Democrat Barack Obama received 54.9% of the vote (5,223 cast), ahead of Republican Mitt Romney with 43.8% (4,171 votes), and other candidates with 1.3% (123 votes), among the 10,697 ballots cast by the township's 12,983 registered voters (1,180 ballots were spoiled), for a turnout of 82.4%. In the 2008 presidential election, Democrat Barack Obama received 56.5% of the vote here (5,517 cast), ahead of Republican John McCain with 41.4% (4,042 votes) and other candidates with 1.4% (133 votes), among the 9,765 ballots cast by the township's 12,615 registered voters, for a turnout of 77.4%. In the 2004 presidential election, Democrat John Kerry received 51.3% of the vote here (4,974 ballots cast), outpolling Republican George W. Bush with 46.2% (4,476 votes) and other candidates with 0.7% (80 votes), among the 9,698 ballots cast by the township's 11,780 registered voters, for a turnout percentage of 82.3.

Gubernatorial election results for Hopewell Township
Year	Republican		Democratic		Third party(ies)	
Year	No.	%	No.	%	No.	%
2025	2,949	31.92%	6,243	67.56%	48	0.52%
2021	2,691	36.71%	4,590	62.61%	50	0.68%
2017	2,527	38.97%	3,849	59.35%	109	1.68%
2013	3,826	61.81%	2,257	36.46%	107	1.73%
2009	3,503	49.27%	3,074	43.23%	533	7.50%
2005	3,274	49.88%	3,074	46.83%	216	3.29%

In the 2013 gubernatorial election, Republican Chris Christie received 61.8% of the vote (3,826 cast), ahead of Democrat Barbara Buono with 36.5% (2,257 votes), and other candidates with 1.7% (107 votes), among the 6,322 ballots cast by the township's 12,818 registered voters (132 ballots were spoiled), for a turnout of 49.3%. In the 2009 gubernatorial election, Republican Chris Christie received 48.9% of the vote here (3,503 ballots cast), ahead of Democrat Jon Corzine with 42.9% (3,074 votes), Independent Chris Daggett with 6.9% (497 votes) and other candidates with 0.5% (36 votes), among the 7,158 ballots cast by the township's 12,441 registered voters, yielding a 57.5% turnout.

United States Senate election results for Hopewell Township1
Year	Republican		Democratic		Third party(ies)	
Year	No.	%	No.	%	No.	%
2024	3,408	32.97%	6,748	65.28%	181	1.75%
2018	3,454	37.78%	5,324	58.23%	365	3.99%
2012	3,970	43.51%	4,995	54.74%	160	1.75%
2006	3,181	46.73%	3,501	51.43%	125	1.84%

United States Senate election results for Hopewell Township2
Year	Republican		Democratic		Third party(ies)	
Year	No.	%	No.	%	No.	%
2020	3,845	35.04%	6,998	63.77%	131	1.19%
2014	2,557	43.32%	3,235	54.80%	111	1.88%
2013	1,630	41.88%	2,216	56.94%	46	1.18%
2008	4,449	48.47%	4,571	49.80%	158	1.72%

== Education ==
Public school students in pre-kindergarten through twelfth grade attend the Hopewell Valley Regional School District. The comprehensive regional public school district serves students from Hopewell Borough, Hopewell Township and Pennington Borough. As of the 2019–20 school year, the district, comprised of six schools, had an enrollment of 3,467 students and 351.1 classroom teachers (on an FTE basis), for a student–teacher ratio of 9.9:1. Schools in the district (with 2019–20 enrollment data from the National Center for Education Statistics) are Bear Tavern Elementary School with 397 students in grades Pre-K–5, Hopewell Elementary School with 400 students in grades Pre-K–5, Stony Brook Elementary School with 378 students in grades K–5, Toll Gate Grammar School with 306 students in grades K–5, Timberlane Middle School with 820 students in grades 6–8 and Hopewell Valley Central High School with 1,097 students in grades 9–12. The district's Board of Education is comprised of nine members, which are allocated to each of the three municipalities based on population, with Hopewell Township assigned seven seats.

Eighth grade students from all of Mercer County are eligible to apply to attend the high school programs offered by the Mercer County Technical Schools, a county-wide vocational school district that offers full-time career and technical education at its Health Sciences Academy, STEM Academy and Academy of Culinary Arts, with no tuition charged to students for attendance.

== Historic district ==
The Pleasant Valley Historic District is a 1,565-acre (633 ha) historic district located along Pleasant Valley Road, Valley Road, Woodens Lane and Hunter Road in the community of Pleasant Valley within Hopewell Township and extending into West Amwell Township in Hunterdon County. The district was added to the National Register of Historic Places on June 14, 1991, for its significance in agriculture, architecture, and exploration/settlement. It includes 52 contributing buildings, 7 contributing structures, and 22 contributing sites.

Central to the district is the Howell Living History Farm, which is a 130-acre (53 ha) living open-air museum located just north of Titusville. The farm was added to the National Register of Historic Places on May 2, 1977, for its significance in agriculture and architecture. The farm was included in the Pleasant Valley Historic District on June 14, 1991. The farm was first created by Joseph Phillips, a blacksmith, who purchased 125 acres (51 ha) from William Bryant in 1732. By 1800, Henry Phillips, Joseph's son, had enlarged the farm by 100 acres (40 ha). The current buildings on the property date to the 19th century, primarily before the American Civil War. The final private owner of the farm was the Howell family, who donated the land to Mercer County in 1974 for use as a museum. The museum shows farm life from the year 1900.

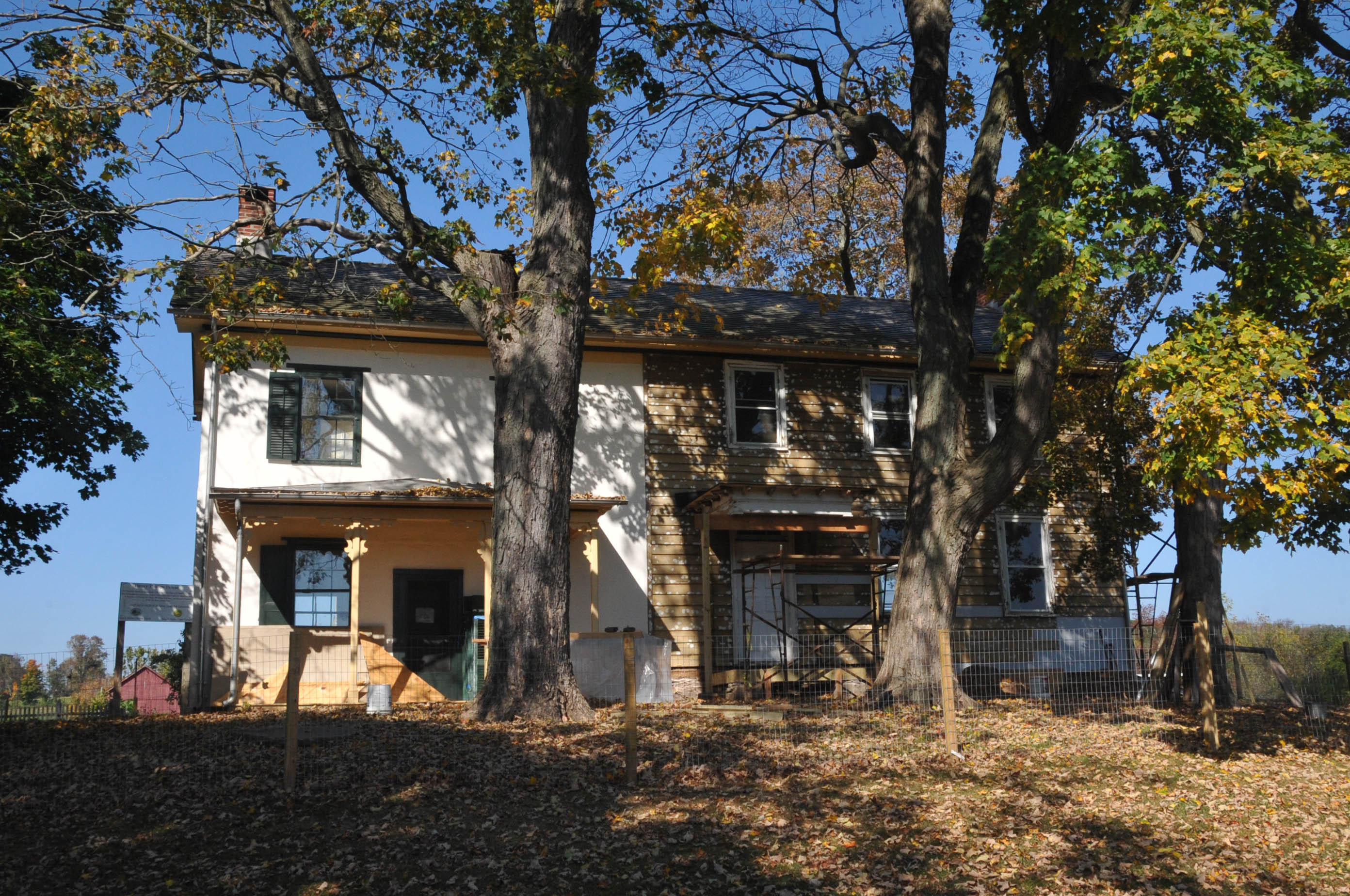
Joseph Phillips Farmhouse

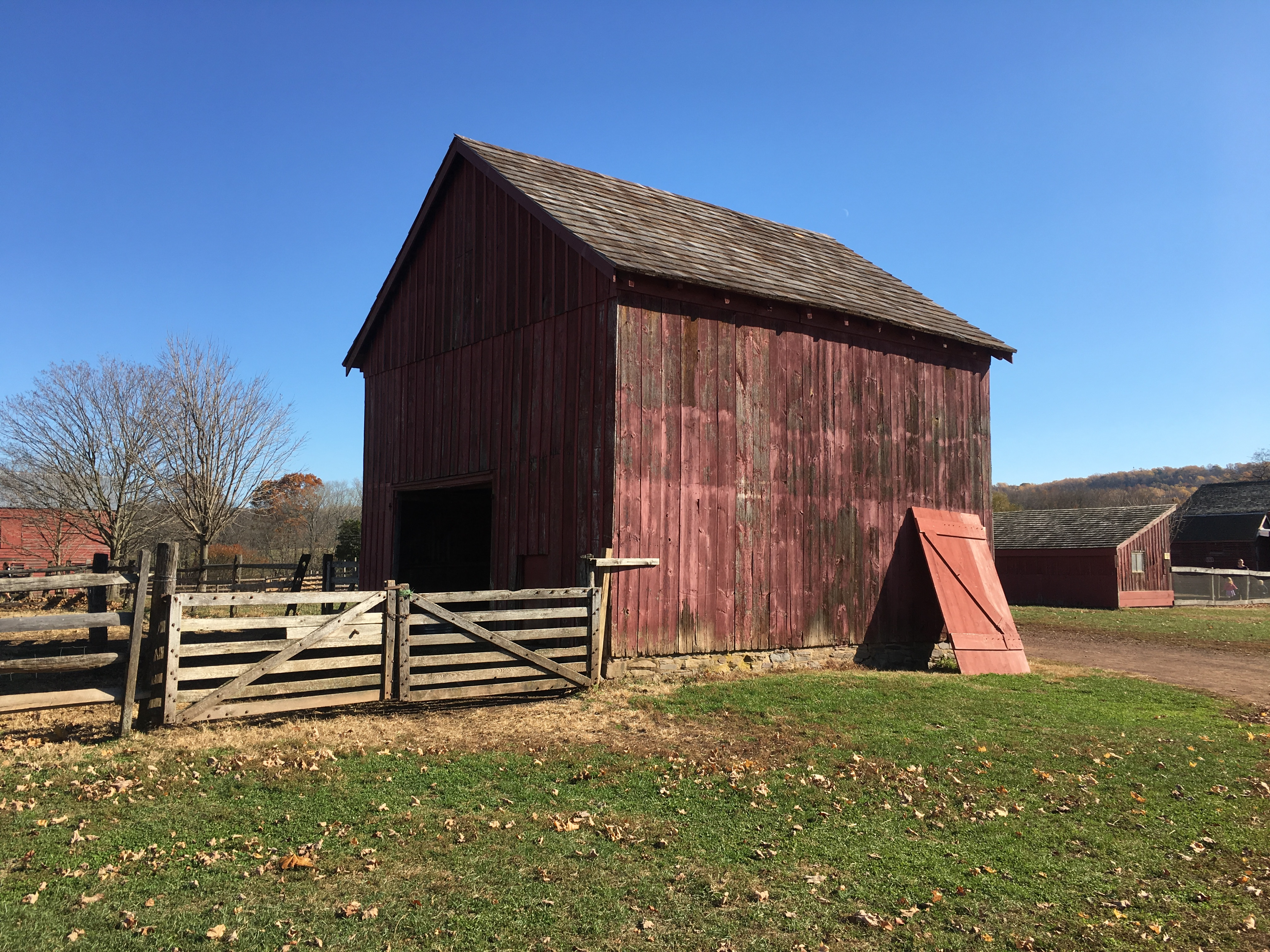
Barn on Joseph Phillips Farm

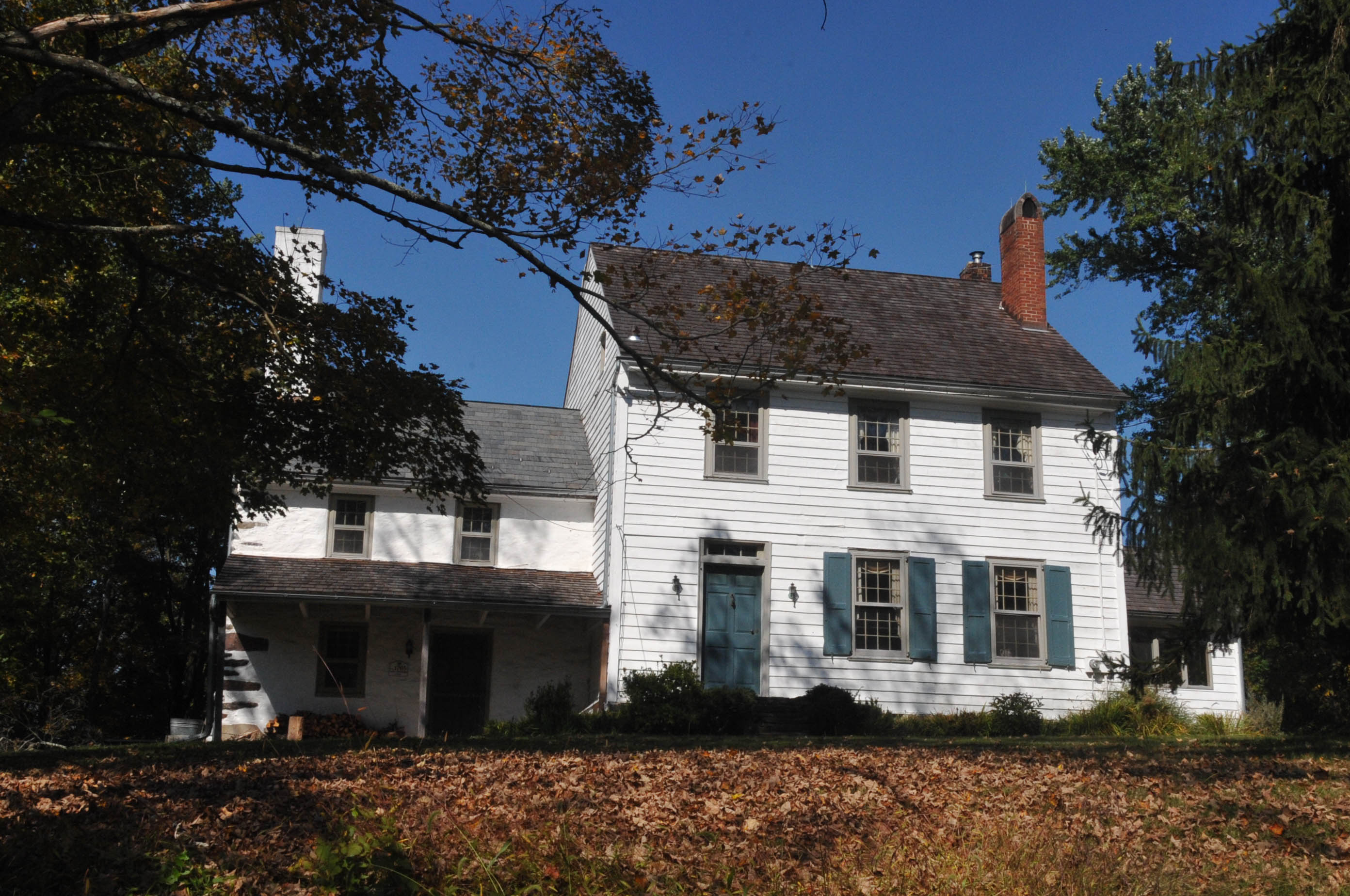
Historic colonial

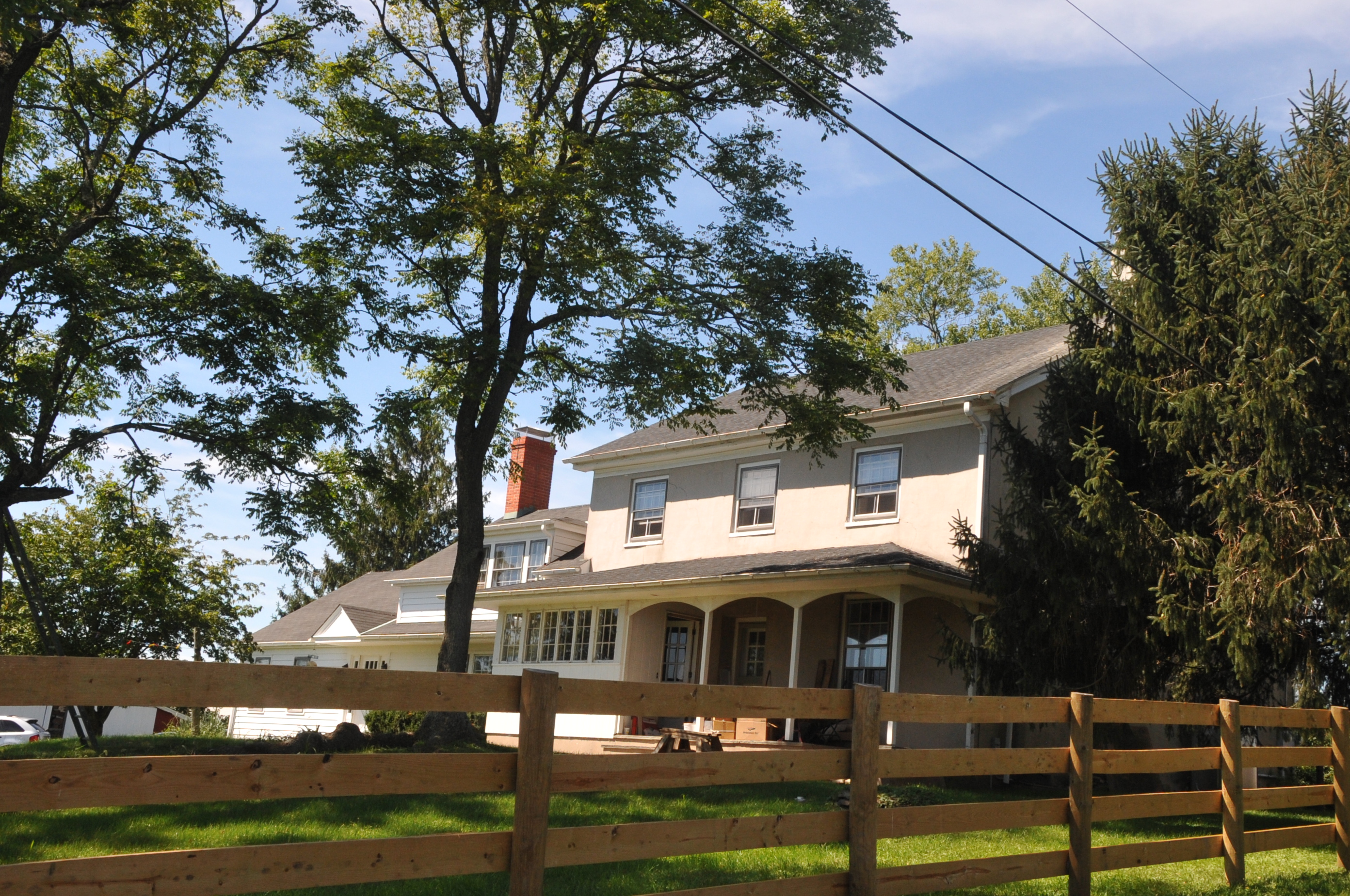
Privately owned colonial along Woodens Lane

== Transportation ==
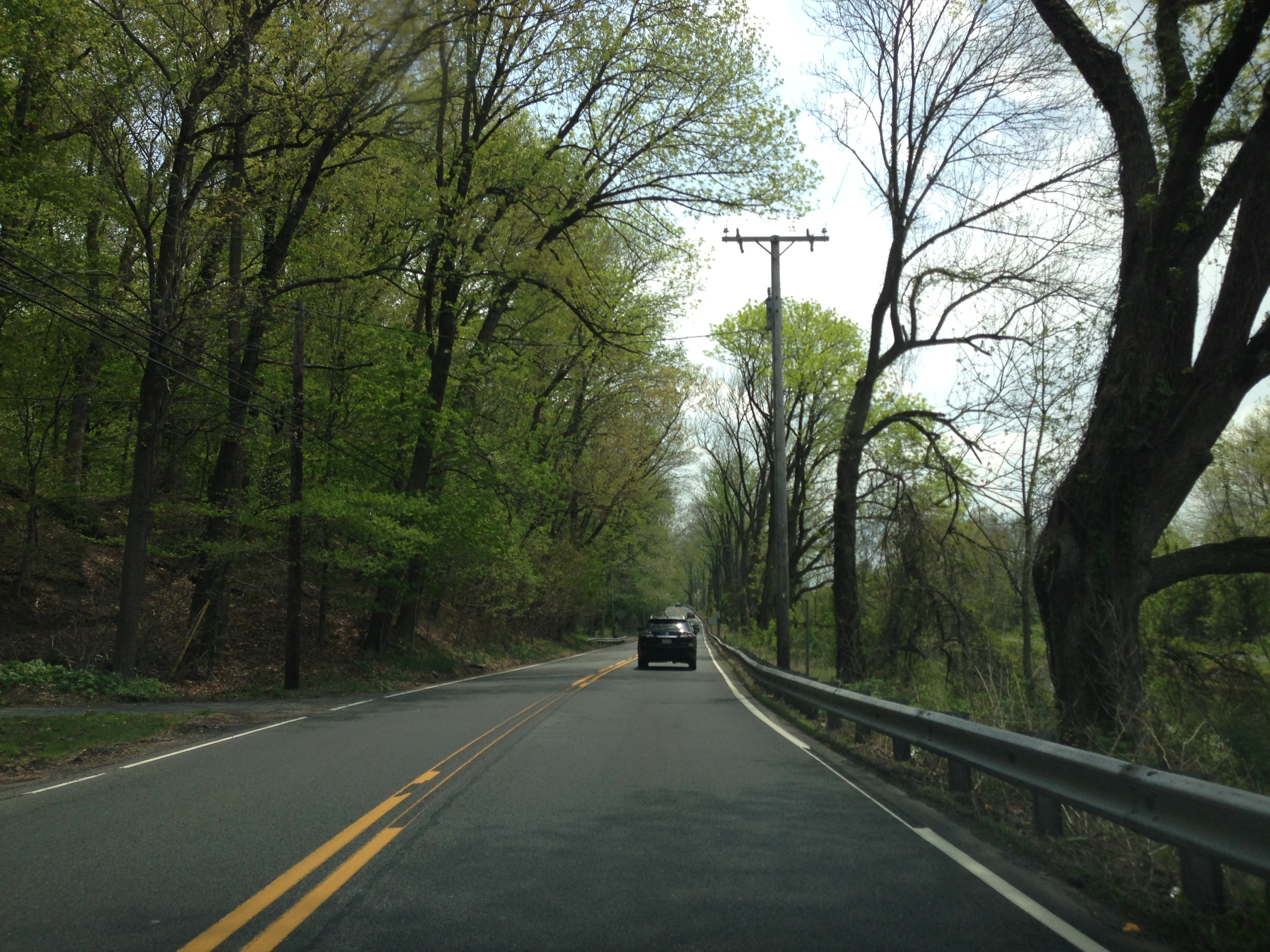
View south along Route 29 in Hopewell Township

=== Roads and highways ===
As of May 2010, the township had a total of 189.67 miles (305.24 km) of roadways, of which 136.96 miles (220.42 km) are maintained by the municipality, 36.68 miles (59.03 km) by Mercer County and 16.03 miles (25.80 km) by the New Jersey Department of Transportation.

Several major highways pass through the township. Route 29 passes through the southwestern part of Hopewell alongside the Delaware and Raritan Canal. Route 31 is the main north–south road that goes through the township. Interstate 295 also passes through in the southern part; the highway has two interchanges in the Township: Exits 73 (Scotch Road) and 72 (Route 31). Major county roads that go through are County Route 518, County Route 546, County Route 569 and County Route 579.

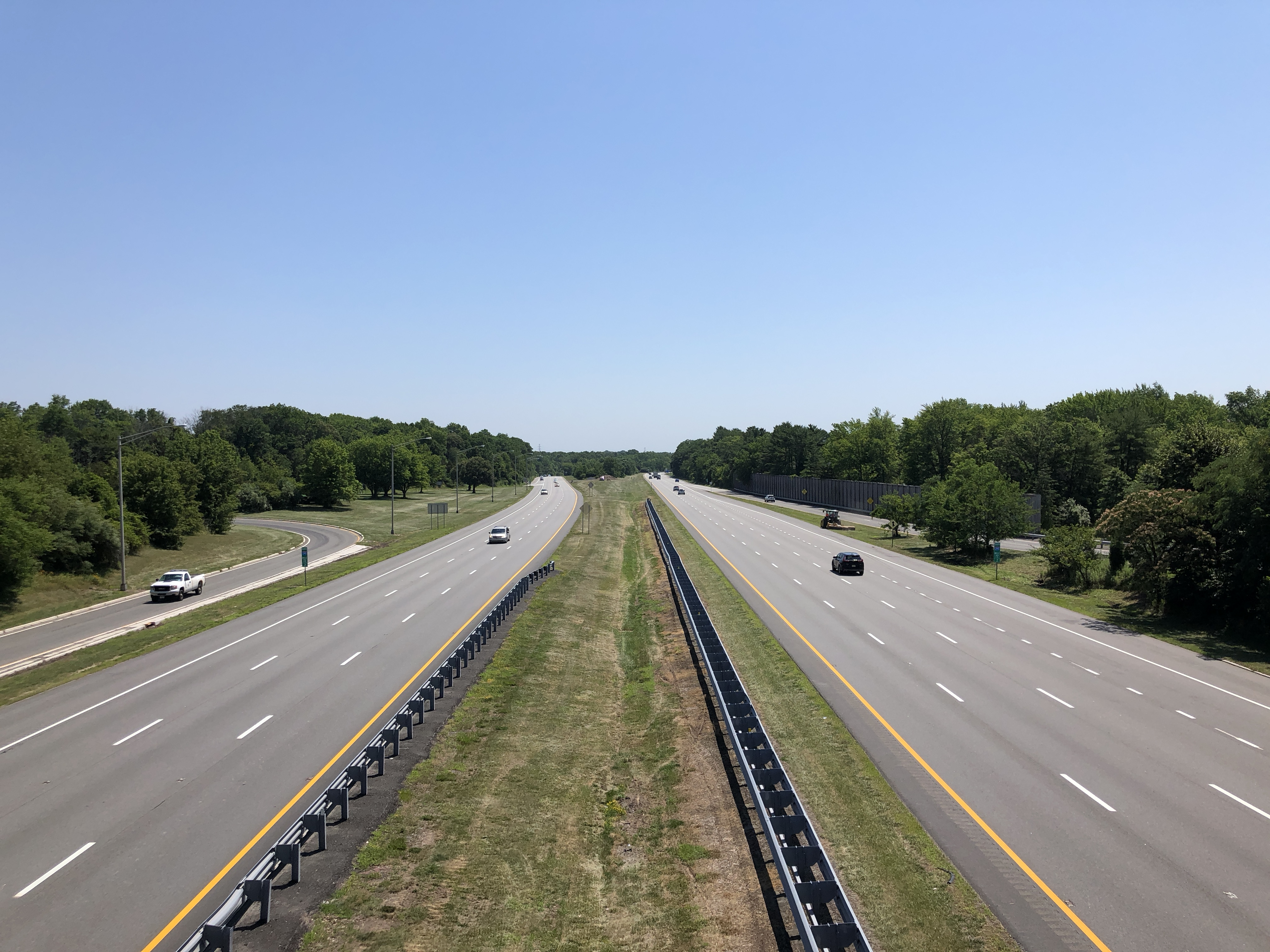
View south along Interstate 295 from Route 31 in Hopewell Township. The interchange with the cancelled Somerset Freeway would have been located in the distance where the median between the northbound and southbound roadways widens and becomes wooded

Hopewell Township was supposed to be where the Somerset Freeway would have started in the south, ending in the north in either Piscataway or Franklin Township. This would have completed Interstate 95 in New Jersey. The cancellation of this project led to having the New Jersey Turnpike carry the interstate numbering instead. Originally, I-295 had extended into Hopewell Township and ended where the supposed Somerset Freeway interchange was to be built. Ultimately, the Somerset Freeway was canceled in 1982. I-295 was redesignated I-95 from the canceled interchange to the exit at U.S. Route 1 in 1993. In March 2018, I-95 through Hopewell Township became I-295 as part of the Pennsylvania Turnpike/Interstate 95 Interchange Project that completed the gap in I-95.

=== Public transportation ===
NJ Transit provides bus service between the township and Trenton on the 624.

== Climate ==
According to the Köppen climate classification system, Hopewell Township has a Hot-summer Humid continental climate (Dfa).

Climate data for Hopewell Twp (40.3357, -74.8281), 1991-2020 normals, extremes 1981-2024
Month	Jan	Feb	Mar	Apr	May	Jun	Jul	Aug	Sep	Oct	Nov	Dec	Year
Record high °F (°C)	71.1 (21.7)	77.6 (25.3)	87.5 (30.8)	94.3 (34.6)	94.8 (34.9)	97.2 (36.2)	103.0 (39.4)	99.2 (37.3)	97.0 (36.1)	93.0 (33.9)	80.1 (26.7)	75.3 (24.1)	103.0 (39.4)
Mean daily maximum °F (°C)	39.4 (4.1)	42.0 (5.6)	50.0 (10.0)	62.3 (16.8)	71.9 (22.2)	80.9 (27.2)	85.7 (29.8)	83.9 (28.8)	77.4 (25.2)	65.5 (18.6)	54.4 (12.4)	44.3 (6.8)	63.2 (17.3)
Daily mean °F (°C)	30.8 (−0.7)	32.8 (0.4)	40.3 (4.6)	51.5 (10.8)	61.3 (16.3)	70.4 (21.3)	75.3 (24.1)	73.6 (23.1)	66.8 (19.3)	54.9 (12.7)	44.5 (6.9)	35.9 (2.2)	53.3 (11.8)
Mean daily minimum °F (°C)	22.3 (−5.4)	23.6 (−4.7)	30.6 (−0.8)	40.7 (4.8)	50.6 (10.3)	59.8 (15.4)	64.9 (18.3)	63.2 (17.3)	56.1 (13.4)	44.4 (6.9)	34.6 (1.4)	27.5 (−2.5)	43.3 (6.3)
Record low °F (°C)	−11.3 (−24.1)	−2.3 (−19.1)	3.9 (−15.6)	18.0 (−7.8)	32.4 (0.2)	42.0 (5.6)	48.4 (9.1)	41.8 (5.4)	36.4 (2.4)	24.6 (−4.1)	10.7 (−11.8)	−0.2 (−17.9)	−11.3 (−24.1)
Average precipitation inches (mm)	3.63 (92)	2.84 (72)	4.21 (107)	3.78 (96)	4.14 (105)	4.53 (115)	4.97 (126)	4.52 (115)	4.26 (108)	4.21 (107)	3.40 (86)	4.45 (113)	48.94 (1,243)
Average snowfall inches (cm)	8.5 (22)	8.8 (22)	4.0 (10)	0.1 (0.25)	0.0 (0.0)	0.0 (0.0)	0.0 (0.0)	0.0 (0.0)	0.0 (0.0)	0.2 (0.51)	0.6 (1.5)	3.5 (8.9)	25.8 (66)
Average dew point °F (°C)	21.0 (−6.1)	21.4 (−5.9)	27.0 (−2.8)	36.7 (2.6)	48.8 (9.3)	59.1 (15.1)	63.8 (17.7)	63.3 (17.4)	57.2 (14.0)	45.6 (7.6)	34.3 (1.3)	26.6 (−3.0)	42.2 (5.7)
Source 1: PRISM
Source 2: NOHRSC (Snow, 2008/2009 - 2024/2025 normals)

== Ecology ==
According to the A. W. Kuchler U.S. potential natural vegetation types, Hopewell Township would have a dominant vegetation type of Appalachian Oak (104) with a dominant vegetation form of Eastern Hardwood Forest (25).

== Media ==
- Hopewell Valley News
- Pennington Post
- Town Topics
- The Hopewell Sun

== Winery ==
- Hopewell Valley Vineyards

== Notable people ==
People who were born in, residents of, or otherwise closely associated with Hopewell Township include:

- John Gano (1727–1804), Baptist minister who is said to have baptized George Washington
- Fred Green (1933–1996), former MLB relief pitcher who played most of his career with the Pittsburgh Pirates
- John Hart (c. 1711–1779), signer of the United States Declaration of Independence
- Thomas Stoltz Harvey (1912–2007), pathologist who conducted the autopsy on Albert Einstein in 1955
- Jean Hollander (1928–2019), poet, translator and teacher
- Robert Hollander (1933–2021), academic and translator, most widely known for his work on Dante Alighieri and Giovanni Boccaccio
- Rush D. Holt Jr. (born 1948), former U.S. Congressman for New Jersey's 12th congressional district, who represented the district from 1999 to 2015
- Robyn Jones (born 1985), professional soccer goalkeeper who played two years for the Philadelphia Independence of Women's Professional Soccer
- James W. Marshall (1810–1885), sawmill operator, whose 1848 find of gold in the American River in California was the impetus for the California Gold Rush
- Lyle and Erik Menendez, convicted of killing their parents in 1989
- Joyce Carol Oates (born 1938), writer
- Anne M. Patterson (born 1959), Associate Justice of the New Jersey Supreme Court
- Debbie Ryan (born 1952), former head coach of the women's basketball team at the University of Virginia, who was inducted into the Women's Basketball Hall of Fame in 2008
- Suthan Suthersan (1956–2017), environmental engineer who served as the Chief Technical Officer and Executive Vice President of Arcadis North America
- Anthony Verrelli (born 1964), carpenter, union leader and politician, who represents the 15th Legislative District in the New Jersey General Assembly
- Brandon Wagner (born 1995), professional baseball player
