= County Route 546 (New Jersey) =

County highway in New Jersey, U.S.

County Route 546
- CR 546 highlighted in red

Route information
- Length: 9.98 mi (16.06 km)

Major junctions
- West end: Route 29 in Hopewell Township
- CR 579 in Hopewell Township; Route 31 in Hopewell Township; US 206 in Lawrence Township; I-295 in Lawrence Township; CR 583 in Lawrence Township
- East end: US 1 in Lawrence Township

Location
- Country: United States
- State: New Jersey
- Counties: Mercer

Highway system
- County routes in New Jersey; 500-series routes
← CR 545	→ CR 547

County Route 546 (CR 546) is a county highway in the U.S. state of New Jersey. The highway begins at Route 29 within the Titusville, New Jersey section of Hopewell Township and extends 9.98 miles (16.06 km) to U.S. Route 1 (US 1) in Lawrence Township. The road runs entirely within Mercer County.

== Route description ==
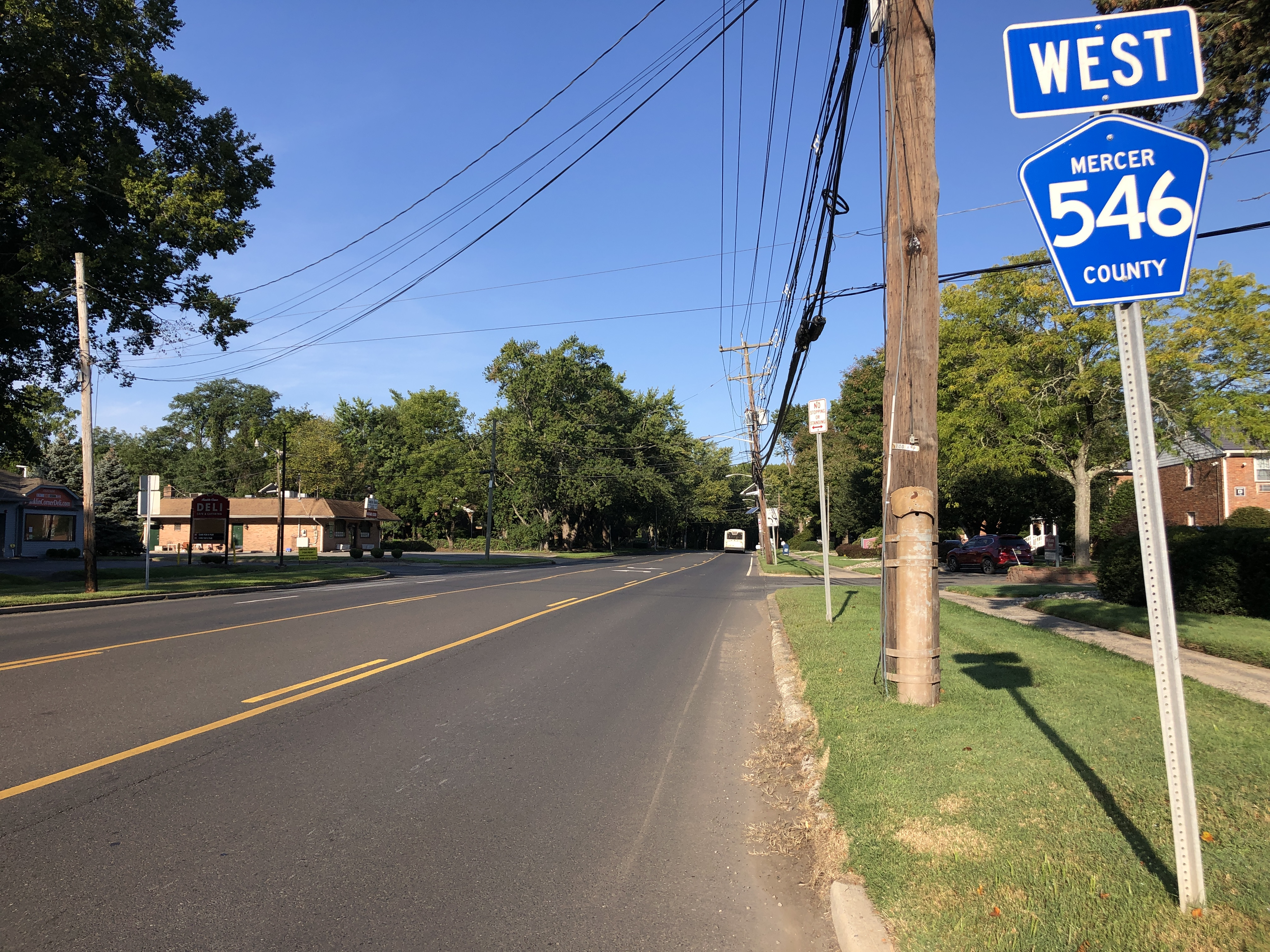
View west along CR 546 at its eastern terminus at US 1 in Lawrence Township

CR 546 begins at an intersection with Route 29 in Hopewell Township, heading northeast on two-lane undivided Washington Crossing-Pennington Road. Past Route 29, the road crosses over the Delaware River on the Washington Crossing Bridge and connects to PA 532 in Washington Crossing, Pennsylvania. CR 546 runs northeast from the western terminus into wooded areas of Washington Crossing State Park. After a turn to the east, the route crosses CR 579 and passes a mix of homes and farms. The road has intersections with CR 637 (Jacobs Creek Road) and CR 611 (Scotch Road) before crossing over CSX’s Trenton Subdivision. Immediately after the bridge, CR 546 has a junction with CR 631 (Ingleside Avenue) prior to reaching the Pennington Circle, a traffic circle, where it meets Route 31 and CR 640 (South Main Street).

A short distance after the circle, the route intersects CR 632 (Blackwell Road) and turns onto Pennington-Lawrenceville Road at that point. The road enters Lawrence Township as it heads into areas of increasing suburban residential neighborhoods and makes a turn to the southeast. In this area, the route crosses US 206 and becomes Franklin Corner Road. A short distance later, the road has a junction with Interstate 295 (I-295) that has a ramp from southbound I-295 to eastbound CR 546. After I-295, CR 546 crosses CR 583 (Princeton Pike) before reaching its eastern terminus at US 1. Past US 1, the road continues east as Bakers Basin Road.

== Major intersections ==
The entire route is in Mercer County.

Location	mi	km	Destinations	Notes
Hopewell Township	0.00	0.00	Route 29 (River Road) / Washington Crossing Bridge – Trenton, Lambertville, Newtown	
Hopewell Township	1.33	2.14	CR 579 (Bear Tavern Road) – Harbourton, West Trenton	
Hopewell Township	4.69	7.55	Route 31 / CR 640 (South Main Street) – Trenton, Pennington, Flemington	Pennington Circle
Lawrence Township	8.14	13.10	US 206 (Main Street) – Trenton, Princeton	
Lawrence Township	9.28	14.93	CR 583 (Princeton Pike) to I-295	
Lawrence Township	9.98	16.06	US 1 – Trenton, New Brunswick	
1.000 mi = 1.609 km; 1.000 km = 0.621 mi: Incomplete access
