= County Route 579 (New Jersey) =

Highway in New Jersey

County Route 579
- CR 579 highlighted in red

Route information
- Length: 37.24 mi (59.93 km)

Major junctions
- South end: Route 29 in Trenton
- I-295 in Ewing Township; Route 31 in West Amwell Township; US 202 / Route 31 in East Amwell Township; Route 179 in East Amwell Township; Route 12 in Raritan Township
- North end: Route 173 in Greenwich Township

Location
- Country: United States
- State: New Jersey
- Counties: Mercer, Hunterdon, Warren

Highway system
- County routes in New Jersey; 500-series routes
← CR 577	→ CR 581

County Route 579 (CR 579) is a county highway in the U.S. state of New Jersey. The highway extends 37.24 miles (59.93 km) from John Fitch Parkway (Route 29) in Trenton to Route 173 in Greenwich Township.

== Route description ==
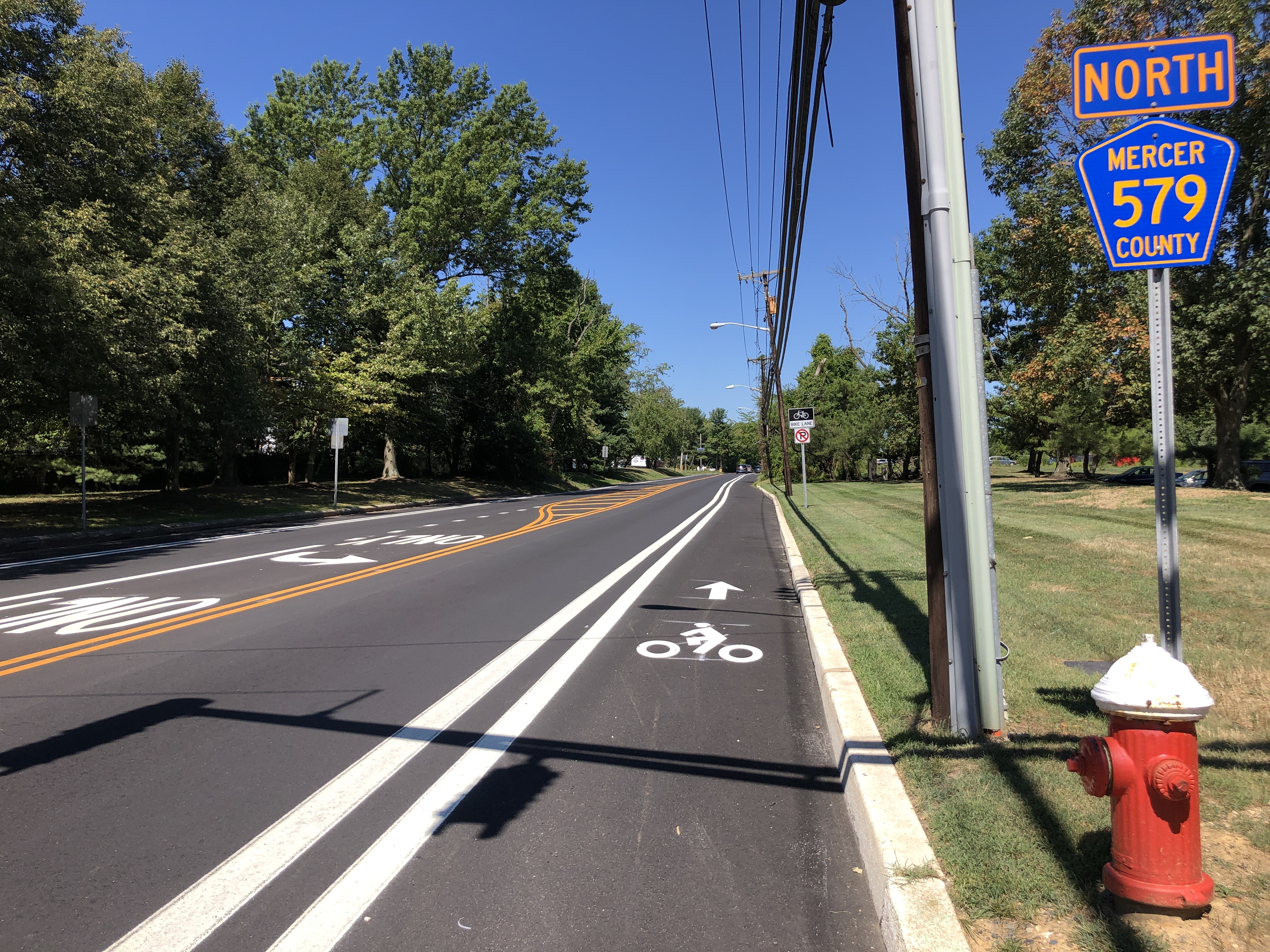
View north along CR 579 past I-295 in Ewing

CR 579 begins at an intersection with Route 29 in Trenton, Mercer County, heading north on two-lane undivided Sullivan Way. The road crosses under the Delaware and Raritan Canal and an abandoned railroad, making a turn to the northwest. The route passes between the Trenton Country Club to the southwest and the Trenton Psychiatric Hospital to the northeast as it enters Ewing Township. CR 579 enters and crosses CR 643, heading into wooded areas as it passes the Katzenbach School for the Deaf. The route passes under a railroad line that is part of CSX's Trenton Subdivision and SEPTA's West Trenton Line southwest of the West Trenton station that serves as the terminus of the SEPTA line, at which point it becomes Grand Avenue and passes through the residential community of West Trenton. CR 579 crosses CR 634, becoming Bear Tavern Road, and turns northwest as it passes near Trenton-Mercer Airport, intersecting CR 600. The route interchanges with Interstate 295 (I-295) and heads into wooded residential areas, intersecting CR 647 before joining CR 637 on Jacobs Creek Road. Here, the road enters forested areas and crosses the Jacobs Creek into Hopewell Township, heading north. CR 579 splits from CR 637 and continues northwest onto Bear Tavern Road, crossing the Jacobs Creek again and turning north into a mix of fields, woods, and homes. The route crosses CR 546 and continues through farmland and woodland with a few residences. The route becomes Harbourton-Rocktown Road and comes to a junction with CR 623 before passing through more forested areas and coming to the CR 518 intersection.

A short distance later, CR 579 continues into West Amwell Township in Hunterdon County, continuing through more rural areas of farms, woods, and homes before intersecting Route 31. The two routes run concurrent to the northwest on the border between West Amwell Township to the west and East Amwell Township to the east, becoming a three-lane road with a center left-turn lane that crosses entirely into East Amwell Township before resuming along the border of East and West Amwell Townships. The road becomes a divided highway and crosses entirely into East Amwell Township again before it comes to an interchange with US 202, where Route 31 heads north along US 202. CR 579 becomes two-lane undivided Linvale-Harbourton Road and heads into the residential community of Ringoes in East Amwell Township, forming a brief concurrency with Route 179. The route splits from Route 179 at the CR 602 intersection and heads north on John Ringo Road, passing homes and fields before crossing under the Black River and Western Railroad. The road heads into agricultural areas and intersects CR 604, at which point CR 579 becomes Ringoes-Croton Road and forms the border between East Amwell Township to the west and Raritan Township to the east before running between Delaware Township to the west and Raritan Township to the east. The road turns more to the northwest as it passes a mix of woods and residential subdivisions, coming to an intersection with CR 523. CR 579 turns southwest for a brief concurrency with CR 523 before winding northwest again along Ringoes-Croton Road. The road passes a mix of farms, woods, and residential neighborhoods before running north into agricultural areas.

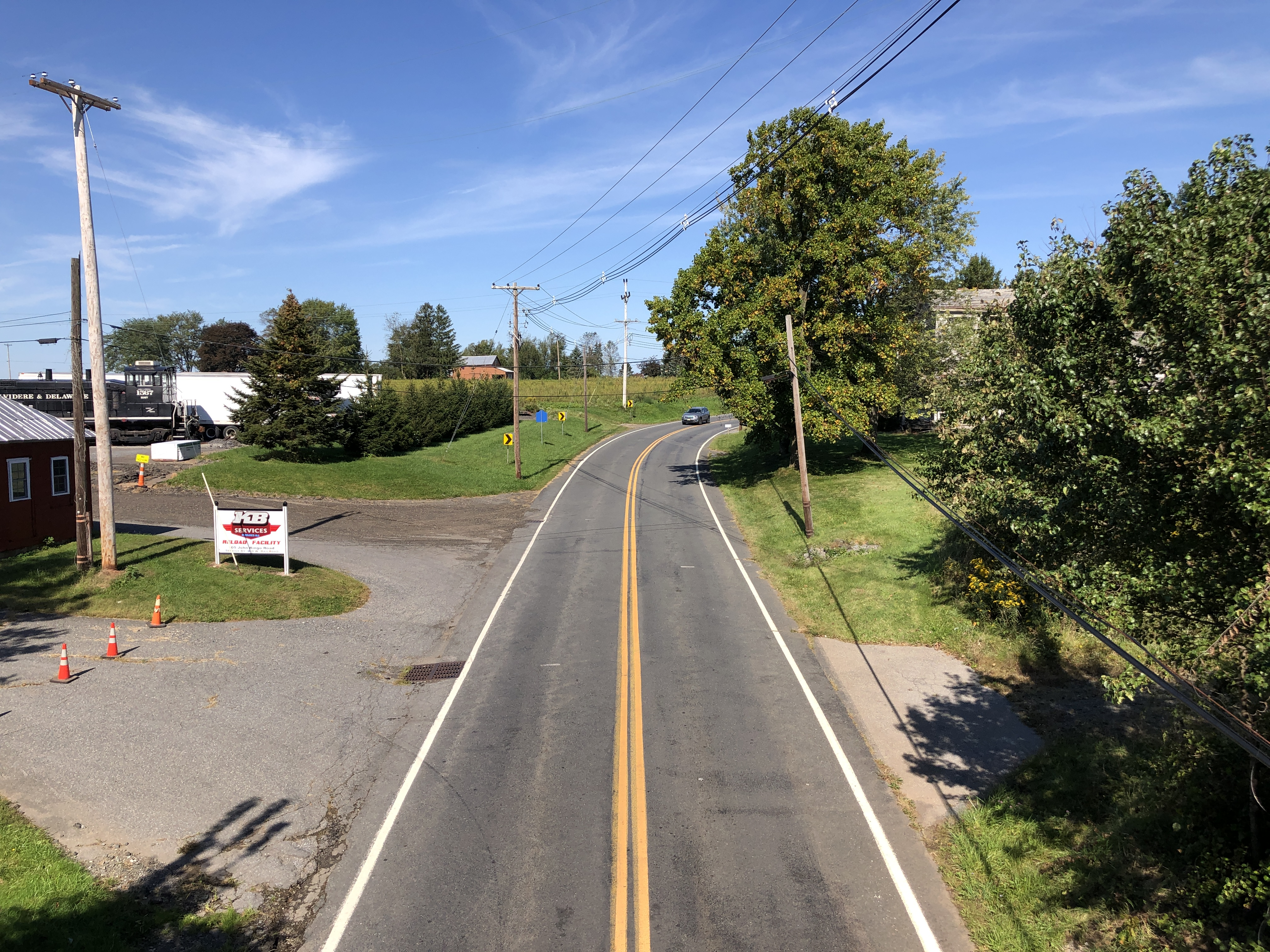
View northbound along CR 579 from the Black River and Western Railroad in Ringoes

The route crosses Route 12 and continues through rural areas of farms, woods, and homes, entering Franklin Township. Here, the road runs through open farmland and comes to the CR 616 intersection, where CR 579 turns northwest into the residential community of Quakertown. The road passes more rural residences and farms before turning north at the CR 615 junction and intersecting CR 513 in the community of Pittstown. CR 579 has a brief concurrency with CR 513, forming the border between Alexandria Township to the west and Franklin Township to the east. CR 579 splits from CR 513 by heading northwest onto Pittstown-Bloomsbury Road. The road continues along the border between Alexandria Township to the southwest and Union Township to the northeast through farmland, woodland, and some housing areas, reaching an intersection with CR 625. The road enters more forested surroundings with some homes prior to the CR 614 intersection. A short distance past CR 614, the route becomes the border between Alexandria Township to the southwest and Bethlehem Township to the northeast, passing some farms and development before heading into forested areas of Musconetcong Mountain. The road winds across the mountain and fully enters Bethlehem Township. Upon passing over Norfolk Southern's Lehigh Line, CR 579 continues into Bloomsbury and becomes Church Street. In Bloomsbury, the road passes through residential areas and crosses Norfolk Southern's Central Running Track line at-grade. After crossing the Musconetcong River into Greenwich Township, Warren County, CR 579 immediately reaches its northern terminus at Route 173.

== Major intersections ==
County	Location	mi	km	Destinations	Notes
Mercer	Trenton	0.00	0.00	Route 29 (John Fitch Way) – Trenton, Lambertville	Southern terminus
Mercer	Ewing Township	3.11	5.01	I-295 – Philadelphia, Princeton	Exit 75 on I-295; former I-95
Mercer	Hopewell Township	5.86	9.43	CR 546 (Washington Crossing Pennington Road) – Pennington	
Mercer	Hopewell Township	10.32	16.61	CR 518 (Hopewell Road)	
Hunterdon	West Amwell Township	12.05	19.39	Route 31 south – Trenton	South end of Route 31 overlap
Hunterdon	East Amwell Township	14.36	23.11	US 202 north / Route 31 north – Flemington	Interchange; north end of Route 31 overlap
Hunterdon	East Amwell Township	14.64	23.56	Route 179 south (Old York Road) – Lambertville, Philadelphia	South end of Route 179 overlap
Hunterdon	East Amwell Township	14.72	23.69	Route 179 north (Old York Road) – Raritan, Branchburg	North end of Route 179 overlap
Hunterdon	Delaware Township	19.22	30.93	CR 523 north (Flemington Road) – Flemington	South end of CR 523 overlap
Hunterdon	Delaware Township	19.33	31.11	CR 523 south – Sergeantsville	North end of CR 523 overlap
Hunterdon	Raritan Township	22.01	35.42	Route 12 – Frenchtown, Flemington	
Hunterdon	Franklin Township	25.73	41.41	CR 513 south – Frenchtown	South end of CR 513 overlap
Hunterdon	Alexandria Township	27.78	44.71	CR 513 north – Clinton	North end of CR 513 overlap
Warren	Greenwich Township	37.24	59.93	Route 173 – Phillipsburg, Easton, Clinton, Somerville	Northern terminus
1.000 mi = 1.609 km; 1.000 km = 0.621 mi: Concurrency terminus
