= Hopewell Valley Regional School District =

School district in Mercer County, New Jersey, US

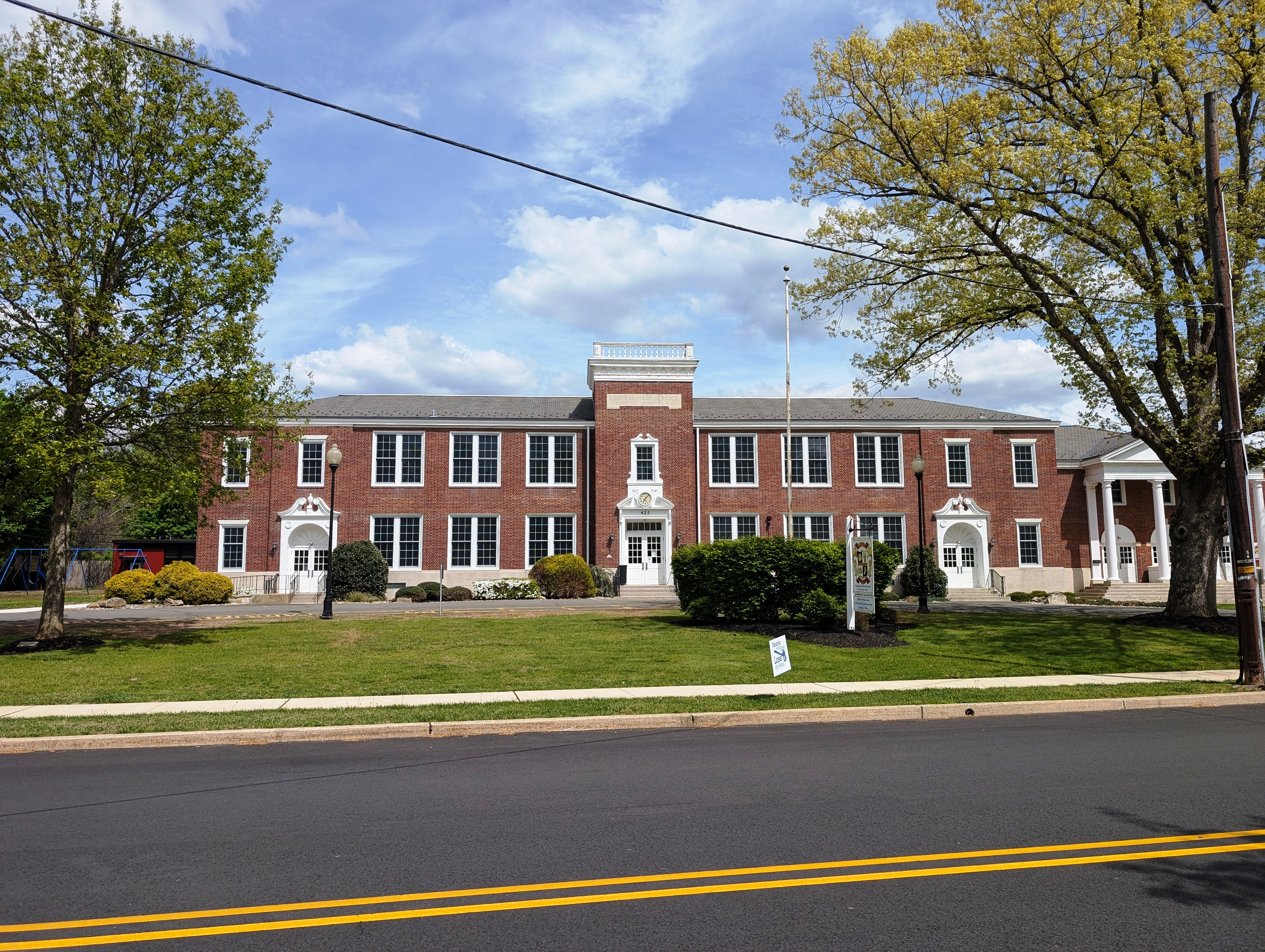
- District offices in Pennington

Address
- 425 South Main Street Pennington, Mercer County, New Jersey, 08534; United States
- Coordinates: 40.319066°N 74.789816°W

District information
- Grades: PreK-12
- Superintendent: Rosetta D. Treece
- Business administrator: Robert Colavita Jr.
- Schools: 6

Students and staff
- Enrollment: 3,432 (as of 2023–24)
- Faculty: 357.0 FTEs
- Student–teacher ratio: 9.61:1

Other information
- District Factor Group: I
- Website: www.hvrsd.org
Ind.	Per pupil	District spending	Rank (*)	K-12 average	%± vs. average
1A	Total Spending	$22,469	92	$18,891	18.9%
1	Budgetary Cost	17,181	93	14,783	16.2%
2	Classroom Instruction	10,827	98	8,763	23.6%
6	Support Services	2,403	59	2,392	0.5%
8	Administrative Cost	1,455	53	1,485	−2.0%
10	Operations & Maintenance	1,999	83	1,783	12.1%
13	Extracurricular Activities	334	86	268	24.6%
16	Median Teacher Salary	75,612	91	64,043
Data from NJDoE 2014 Taxpayers' Guide to Education Spending. *Of K-12 districts with more than 3,500 students. Lowest spending=1; Highest=103

The Hopewell Valley Regional School District is a comprehensive regional public school district serving students in pre-kindergarten through twelfth grade from three communities in Mercer County, in the U.S. state of New Jersey. The municipalities that are part of this district are Hopewell Borough, Hopewell Township and Pennington Borough.

As of the 2023–24 school year, the district, comprised of six schools, had an enrollment of 3,432 students and 357.0 classroom teachers (on an FTE basis), for a student–teacher ratio of 9.61:1.

The district participates in the Interdistrict Public School Choice Program, which allows non-resident students to attend school in the district at no cost to their parents, with tuition covered by the resident district. Available slots are announced annually by grade.

The district had been classified by the New Jersey Department of Education as being in District Factor Group "I", the second-highest of eight groupings. District Factor Groups organize districts statewide to allow comparison by common socioeconomic characteristics of the local districts. From lowest socioeconomic status to highest, the categories are A, B, CD, DE, FG, GH, I and J.

== Awards and recognition ==
In 2022, the United States Department of Education announced that Stony Brook Elementary School was named as a National Blue Ribbon School, along with eight other schools in the state and 297 schools nationwide.

In 2011, the district was named to the College Board's AP Honor Roll. The honor roll consists of the 388 U.S. public school districts that simultaneously achieved increases in access to AP courses for a broader number of students and also maintained or improved the rated at which their AP students earned scores of 3 or higher on an AP Exam.

In 2004, the district was named to the American Music Conference's list of the "Best 100 Communities for Music Education in New Jersey". The district has been recognized on multiple occasions for its high-caliber music and performing arts programs.

The NAMM Foundation named the district in its 2009 survey of the "Best Communities for Music Education", which included 124 school districts nationwide.

The district's high school was the 16th-ranked public high school in New Jersey out of 322 schools statewide, in New Jersey Monthly magazine's September 2018 cover story on the state's "Top Public High Schools", after being ranked 39th in 2008 out of 316 schools. The magazine took into account factors such as class size, teachers with advanced degrees, and socioeconomic factors.

== Schools ==
Schools in the district (with 2019–20 enrollment data from the National Center for Education Statistics) are:

Elementary schools

- Bear Tavern Elementary School with 420 students in grades PreK-5
  - Jay Billy, principal
- Hopewell Elementary School with 408 students in grades PreK-5
  - Scott Brettell, principal
- Stony Brook Elementary School with 382 students in grades K-5
  - Nicole Gianfredi, principal
- Toll Gate Grammar School with 319 students in grades K-5
  - Melissa Lauri, principal

Middle school

- Timberlane Middle School with 806 students in grades 6-8
  - Christopher Turnbull, principal

High School

- Hopewell Valley Central High School with 1,076 students in grades 9-12
  - Patricia Riley, principal

== Administration ==
Core members of the district's administration are:

- Dr. Rosetta D. Treece, superintendent
- Heather Pyle, assistant superintendent for business and board secretary

== Board of education ==
The district's board of education, comprised of nine members, sets policy and oversees the fiscal and educational operation of the district through its administration. As a Type II school district, the board's trustees are elected directly by voters to serve three-year terms of office on a staggered basis, with three seats up for election each year held (since 2012) as part of the November general election. The board appoints a superintendent to oversee the district's day-to-day operations and a business administrator to supervise the business functions of the district. The board of education, whose members are elected by the Hopewell Valley community, has nine members allocated to each of the three municipalities based on population, with Hopewell Township assigned seven seats and both Hopewell and Pennington each assigned a single seat.

Members of the board are:

- Anita Williams Galiano, Hopewell Township, President
- Jacquie Genovesi, Titusville, Vice- President
- Amanda Stylianou, Hopewell Township
- William Keithler, Hopewell Township
- Dhruv Kapadia, Hopewell Township
- Alex Reznik, Pennington Borough
- John Slotman, Hopewell Township
- Mark Peters, Hopewell Borough
- Pamela Lilleston, Hopewell Township

According to Business Practice 9000, the local board of education has full power to operate the local public schools in compliance with state and federal mandates and pertinent to the laws of the municipality. The board functions as a corporate body only when in session.

== Controversy and sexual abuse allegations ==
There have been several allegations made against the Hopewell Valley Regional School District. In 2015, Former Hopewell teacher Matthew Hoffman was found liable for repeated sexual abuse of a student in a classroom. Allegations against a current Hopewell Social Studies teacher were made in a court filing on October 31, 2019. Although initially issuing a press release defending the teacher, further investigation by the school found cause to immediately pull him from the classroom effective November 12, 2019.
