= Washington Crossing Open Air Theatre =

Coordinates: 40.3078°N 74.8604°W

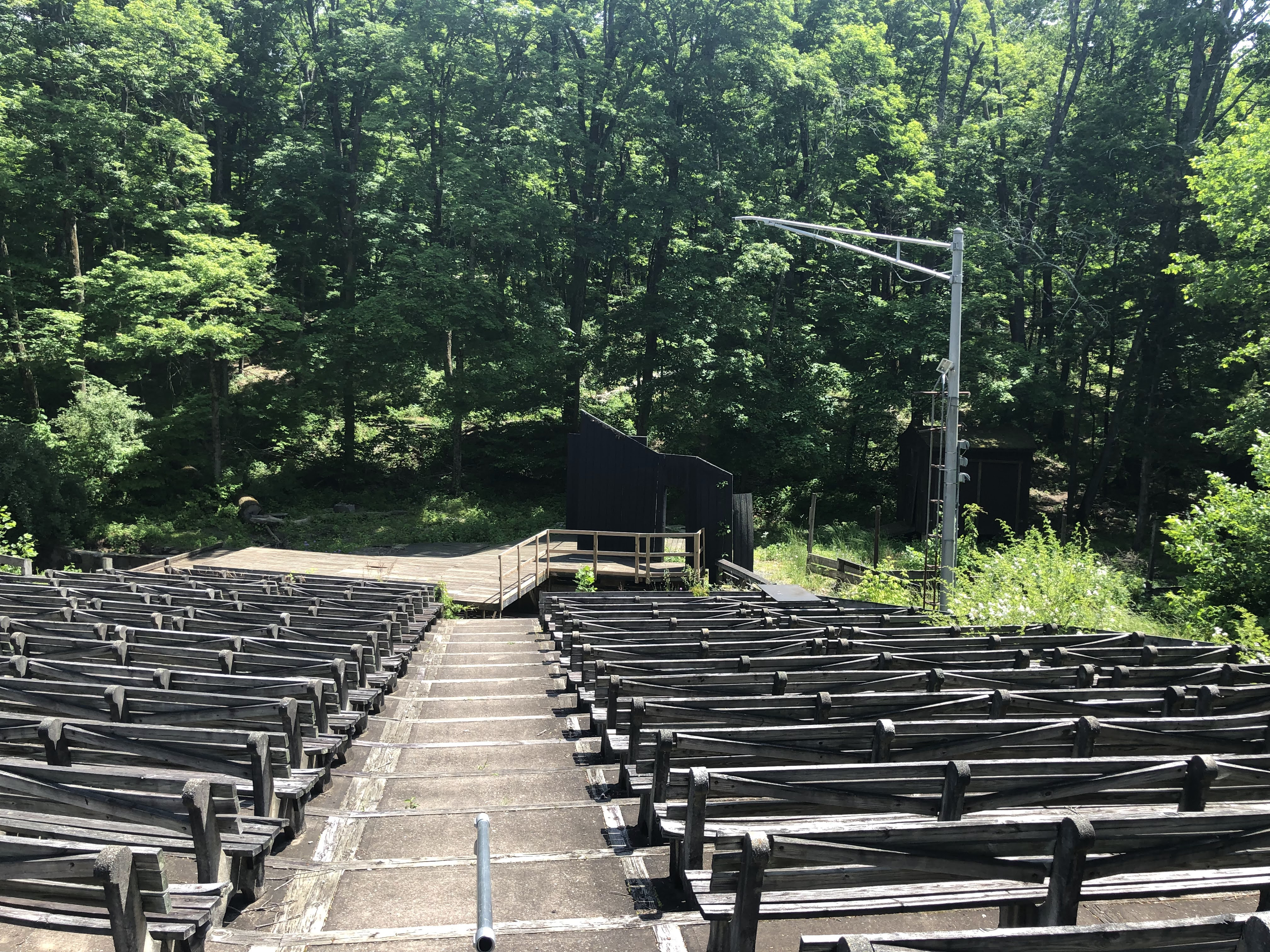
A view of the Washington Crossing Open Air Theatre in 2023.

The Open Air Theatre in Washington Crossing State Park in the Titusville section of Hopewell Township, Mercer County, New Jersey, is a permanent outdoor venue with a six-month summer seasonand has hosted a variety of performances, including musicals, plays, concerts, and dance recitals. The venue is available for use by submitting a special use application to the Park Office.

The theatre was built in 1935 as part of the New Deal's Works Progress Administration (WPA) programme. It was designed by architect Aymar Embury II, who also designed the Cape May Point State Park Lighthouse and the New Jersey State Capitol Annex.

From 2010–2017, the venue was leased by the Downtown Performing Arts Center (DPAC). The company have now moved indoors and rebranded as Music Mountain Theatre. The company has no intentions of coming back, and the theatre has remained closed and abandoned since.

== Early History (1935-Late 1900s) ==
As part of the Federal Theatre Project the theatre was constructed in 1935. Architect Aymar Embury II was responsible for its design.

== Downtown Performing Arts Center (2010–2017) ==
Founded in 2001 by Virginia Brennan, Downtown Performing Arts Center moved into the Open Air Theatre for the summer of 2010. The company was led by Co-Artistic Directors Louis Palena and Jordan Brennan. During their eight-year tenure, the company produced over 50 productions. Amongst these were numerous World Premieres, written by playwright Louis Palena. In addition to their extensive list of "Mainstage" productions, the company ran a parallel program of "Children's Theatre" shows, which were produced in a week and performed for two weekends.

"Mainstage" Production History included:

- The Legend of Sleep Hollow [World Premiere] (2012)
- Joseph and the Amazing Technicolor Dreamcoat (2016)
- An annual concert called "Stars 'n Stripes"
- the Wizard of Oz (2017) "An Open Air Theatre tradition"

"Children's Theatre" Production History included:

- Sleeping Beauty [World Premiere] (2016)

=== Curtain Up! Productions ===
Due to the difficulties experienced with the weather they soon began looking for a new indoor venue. In November 2013, the company founded Curtain Up Productions Inc. to fund the creation of a new theatre. The two organisations worked together to fund indoor performances during the off season away from the park, including DPAC's annual performance of A Christmas Carol.

Production History included:

- A Christmas Carol (annual)
- Rapunzel (2015)
- Charlie Brown Christmas (2016)

== Recent History (since 2017) ==
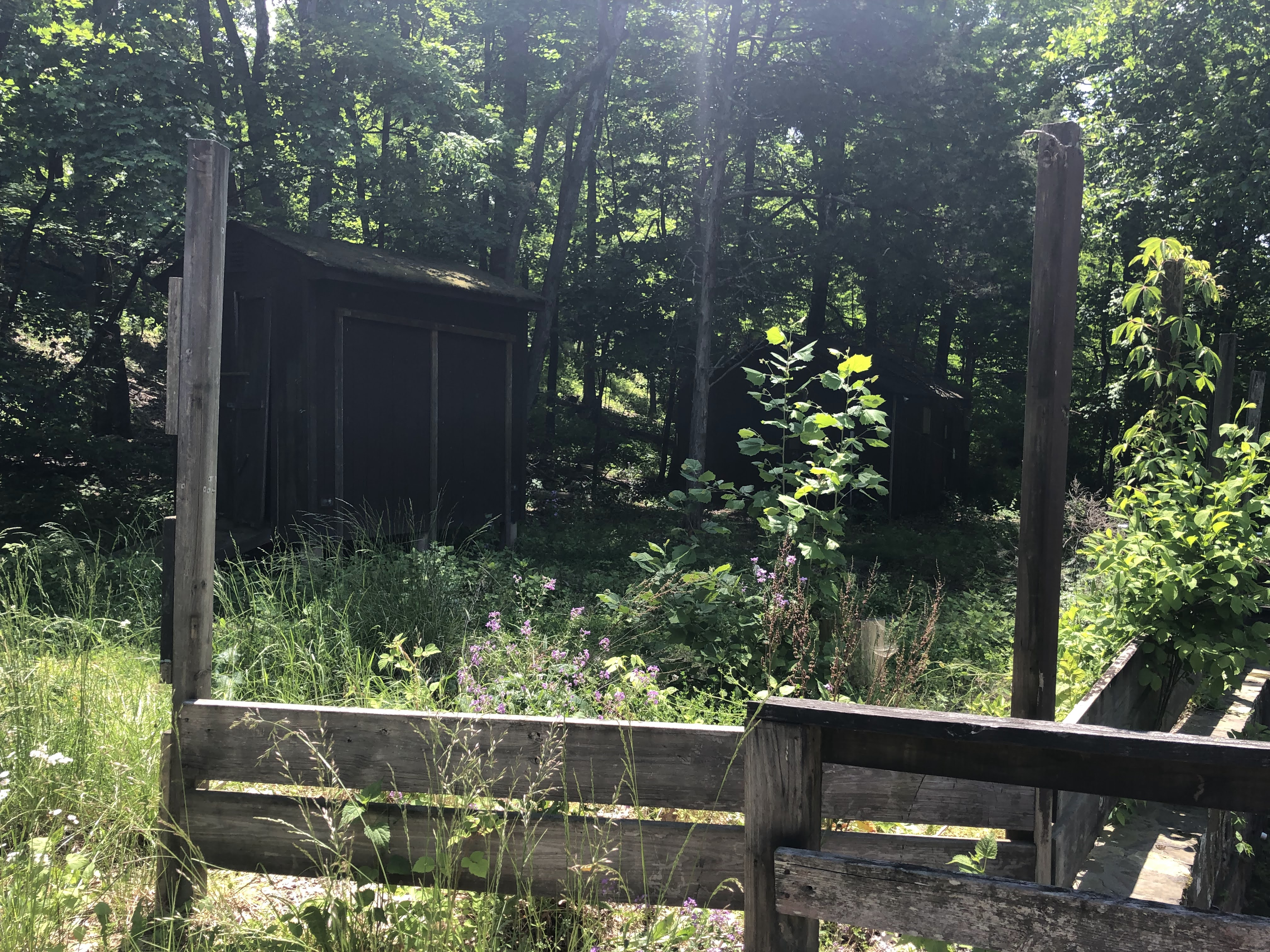
A view of the backstage of the Open Air Theatre in 2023. The visible structures are the tool shed (left) and the dressing room (right).

Downtown Performing Arts Center has since relocated indoors and changed its name to the Music Mountain Theatre. The theatre has been "dark" and deserted ever since, though it is accessible to the public via footpaths and the original car park.
