= Titusville, New Jersey =

Populated place in Mercer County, New Jersey, US

- Census-designated place
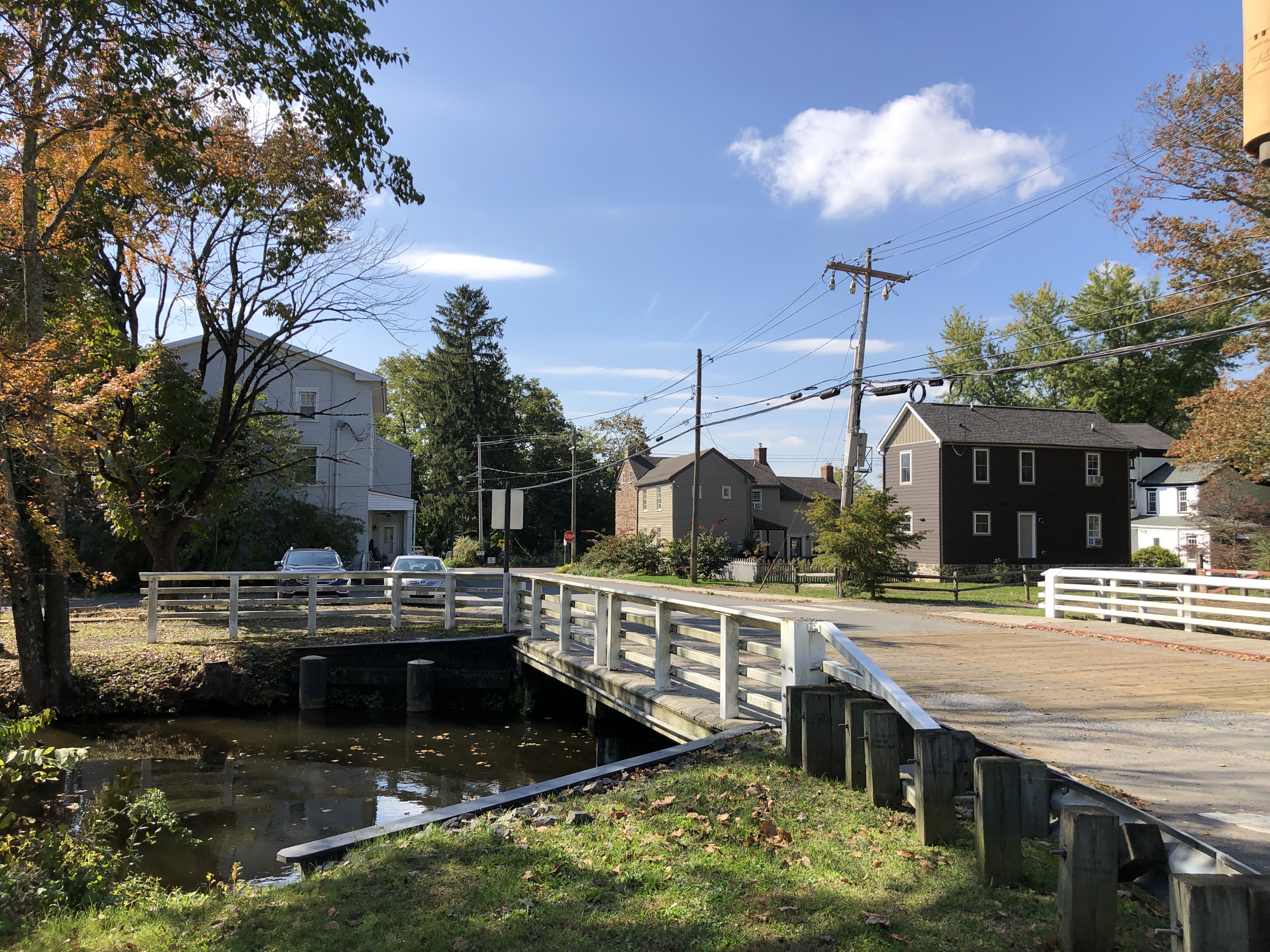
- Church Road at the Delaware and Raritan feeder canal in Titusville

- Location within Mercer County, New Jersey Location within New Jersey Location within the United States
- Coordinates: 40°18′34″N 74°52′50″W
- Country: United States
- State: New Jersey
- County: Mercer
- Township: Hopewell

Area
  - Total: 0.552 sq mi (1.43 km^{2})
  - Land: 0.468 sq mi (1.21 km^{2})
  - Water: 0.084 sq mi (0.22 km^{2})
- Elevation: 85 ft (26 m)

Population (2020)
  - Total: 633
  - Density: 1,352.56/sq mi (522.23/km^{2})
- Time zone: UTC– 05:00 (Eastern (EST))
  - Summer (DST): UTC– 04:00 (EDT)
- ZIP Code: 08560
- FIPS code: 34-73050
- GNIS feature ID: 0881197

Titusville is an unincorporated community and census-designated place (CDP) in Hopewell Township, Mercer County, in the U.S. state of New Jersey. As of the 2020 census, the population was 633. The area includes a post office with its own ZIP Code (08560), several restaurants, gas stations, a firehouse, and a small cluster of homes. Washington Crossing State Park, dedicated to George Washington's crossing of the Delaware River in 1776, is adjacent to the community.

== History ==
The Titus family first settled the area in the early 1700s. By the time he died in 1797, Joseph Titus had assembled a family farmstead of almost 300 acres (120 ha), from which he developed the village.

Titusville is just north of the Johnson Ferry House in adjacent Washington Crossing, the scene of George Washington's crossing of the Delaware River during the American Revolutionary War. In 1831, the ferry was replaced by the Washington Crossing Bridge, linking it with Washington Crossing in Pennsylvania.

In 1851, the Belvidere-Delaware Railroad opened to Titusville and a station was built in the town. Passenger service ceased at Titusville in April 1952 but passenger trains to other towns continued operating until October 1960. Freight continued to run on this portion of the line until 1976. Track was subsequently removed for the Delaware & Raritan Canal State Park recreational trail in the early 1980s.

=== Historic district ===
- Titusville Historic District
- U.S. National Register of Historic Places
- U.S. Historic district
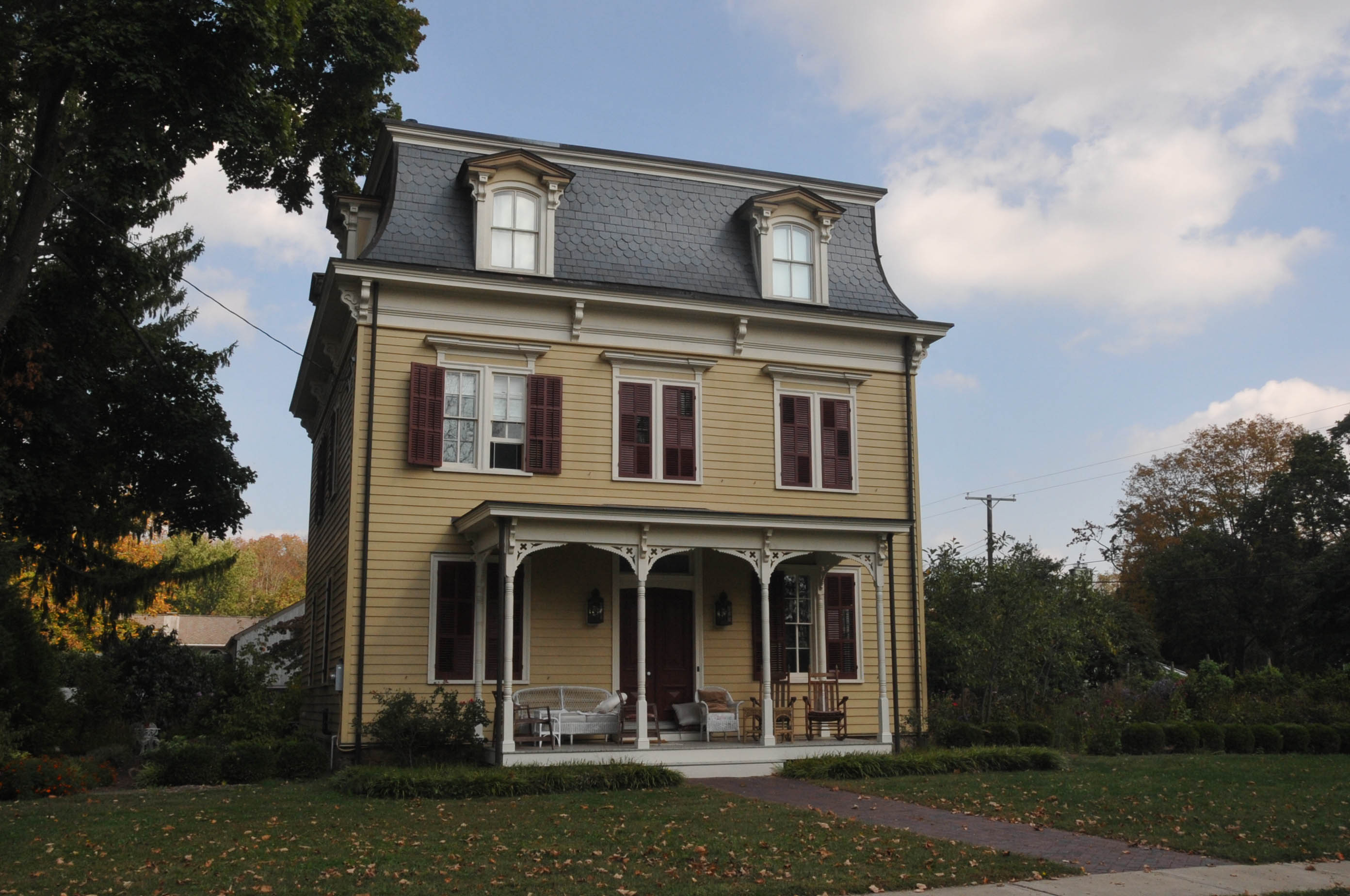
- Location: River Drive, Titusville
- Area: 82 acres (33 ha)
- Built: 1835
- Architectural style: Greek Revival, Late Victorian, Bungalow/Craftsman
- NRHP reference No.: 83001604
- Added to NRHP: March 17, 1983

The Titusville Historic District was added to the National Register of Historic Places on March 17, 1983, for its significance in architecture, industry, religion, and transportation. It includes 100 contributing buildings.

== Geography ==
Titusville's central feature is a small village that sits on a bluff overlooking a picturesque stretch of the Delaware River, with stairwells connecting the village to private docks on the river. The community is bisected by New Jersey Route 29 (River Road), a busy road that runs along the east side of the Delaware. The Delaware and Raritan feeder canal runs parallel to the river just to the east of the village, which is connected to River Road by several two-lane bridges. A biking/walking trail follows the canal, constructed when the former Belvidere-Delaware Railroad line was removed in the early 1980s. Opposite the canal from the river, extending eastward, are a number of small residential streets, a county park centered about Baldpate Mountain, and the homes ringing the base of the mountain and county park.

Washington Crossing State Park, an 800-acre (320 ha) tract of woods, fields, and streams, borders the community to the north and east. The park covers the gradual slope from Bear Tavern Road down to the Delaware River.

According to the U.S. Census Bureau, the Titusville CDP has a total area of 0.55 square miles (1.42 km^{2}), of which 0.47 square miles (1.22 km^{2}) are land and 0.08 square miles (0.21 km^{2}), or 15.2%, are water.

Titusville is home to Janssen Pharmaceuticals Inc., a division of Johnson and Johnson.

== Education ==
All of Hopewell Township, including Titusville, is served by the Hopewell Valley Regional School District.

== Demographics ==
Titusville first appeared as a census designated place in the 2020 U.S. census.

Titusville CDP, New Jersey – Racial and ethnic composition Note: the US Census treats Hispanic/Latino as an ethnic category. This table excludes Latinos from the racial categories and assigns them to a separate category. Hispanics/Latinos may be of any race.
Race / Ethnicity (NH = Non-Hispanic)	Pop 2020	2020
White alone (NH)	556	87.84%
Black or African American alone (NH)	10	1.58%
Native American or Alaska Native alone (NH)	0	0.00%
Asian alone (NH)	8	1.26%
Native Hawaiian or Pacific Islander alone (NH)	0	0.00%
Other race alone (NH)	3	0.47%
Mixed race or Multiracial (NH)	34	5.37%
Hispanic or Latino (any race)	22	3.48%
Total	633	100.00%

== Notable people ==
People who were born in, residents of, or otherwise closely associated with Titusville include:

- William H. Blackwell (1882–1963), fruit farmer and politician
- Robyn Jones (born 1985), professional soccer goalkeeper who played two years for the Philadelphia Independence of Women's Professional Soccer

== Gallery ==
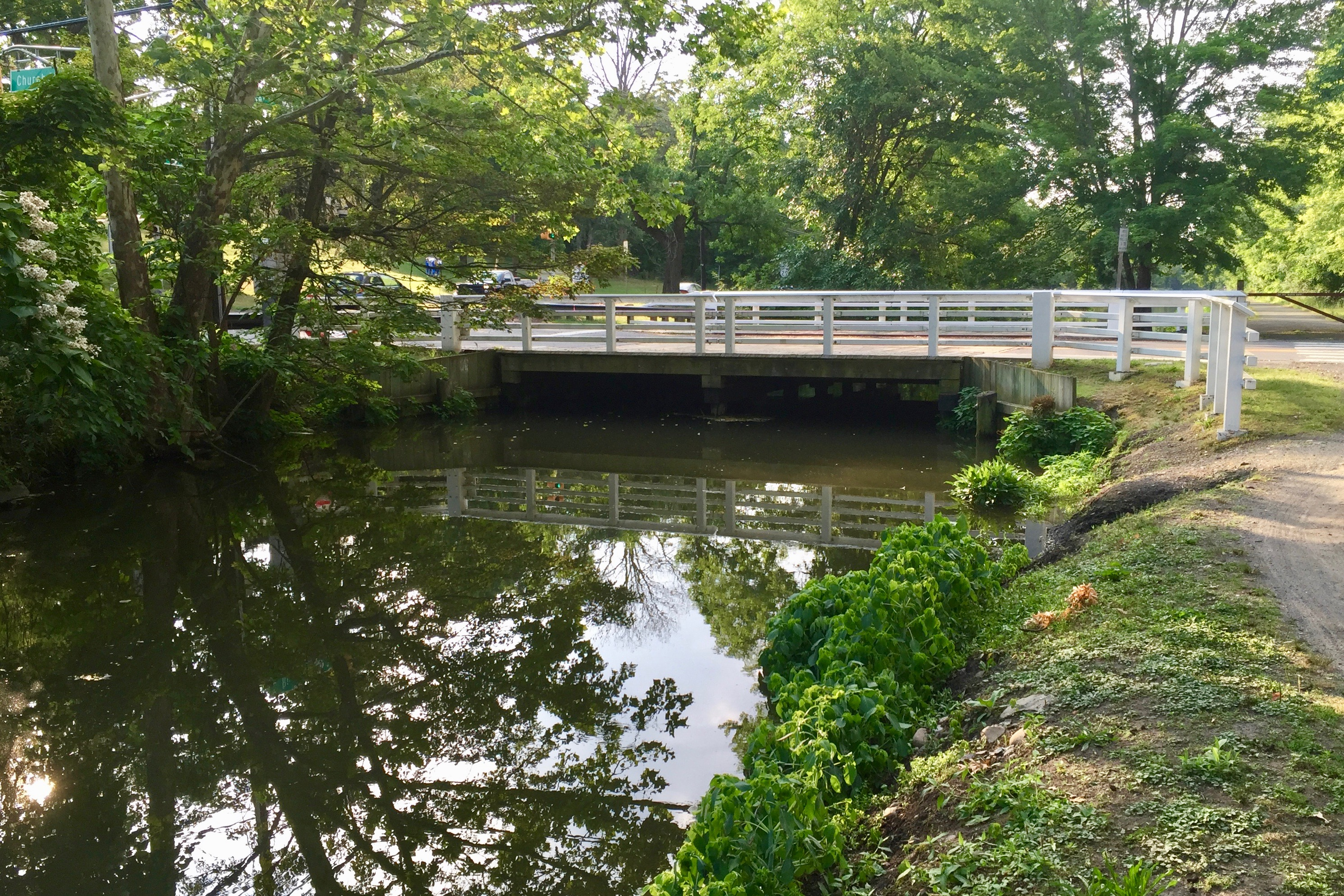
Church Road bridge over the Delaware and Raritan Canal

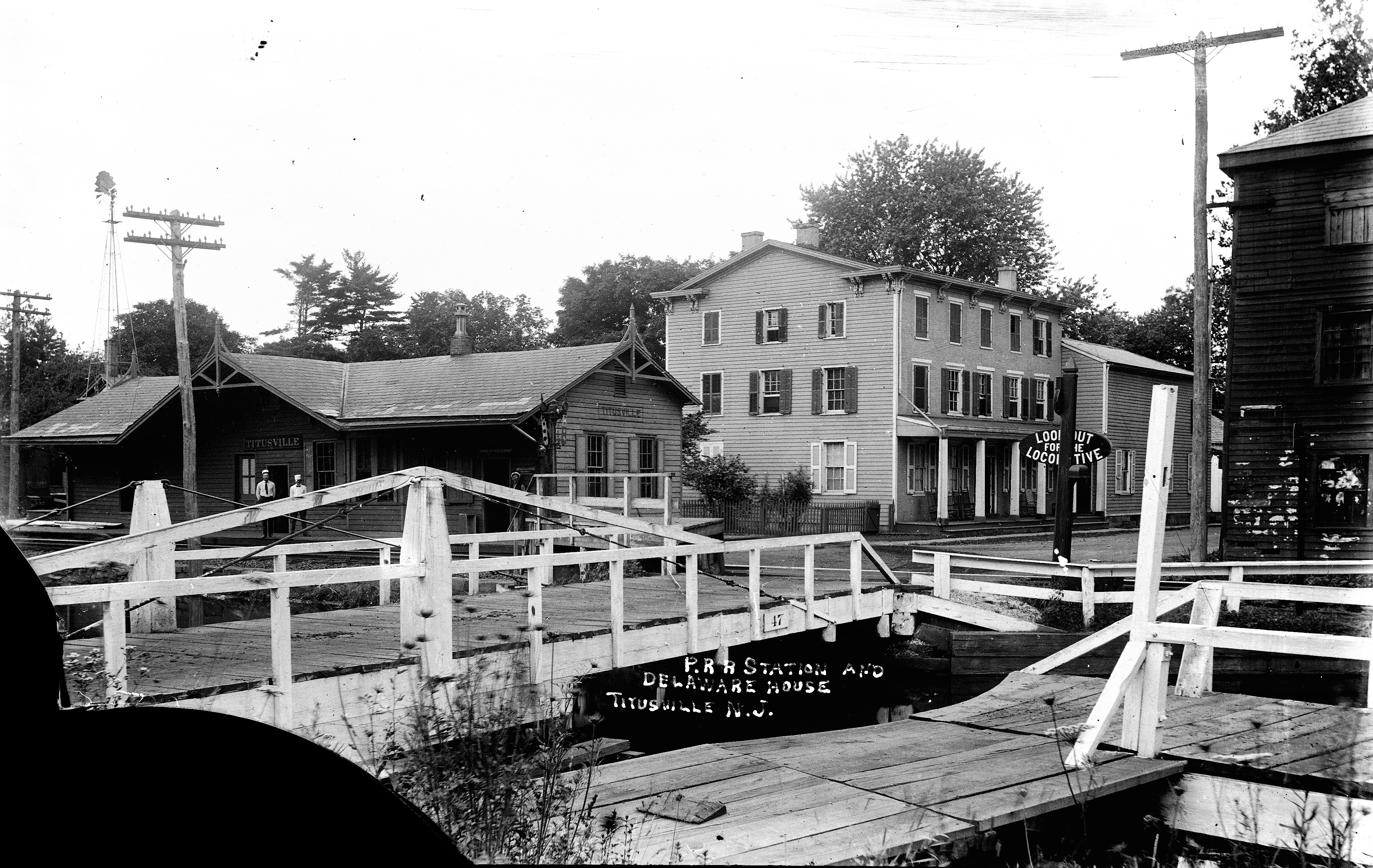
Former Belvidere-Delaware Railroad station

== See also ==
- Howell Living History Farm
- Central Delaware Valley AVA
- Washington Crossing Historic Park, across in the river in Pennsylvania
