= Senator Blackwell =

Senator Blackwell may refer to:

- Kevin Blackwell (politician) (born 1954), Mississippi State Senate
- Slade Blackwell (born 1968), Alabama State Senate
- William H. Blackwell (1882–1963), New Jersey State Senate
