= Washington Crossing, New Jersey =

Populated place in Mercer County, New Jersey, US

- Census-designated place
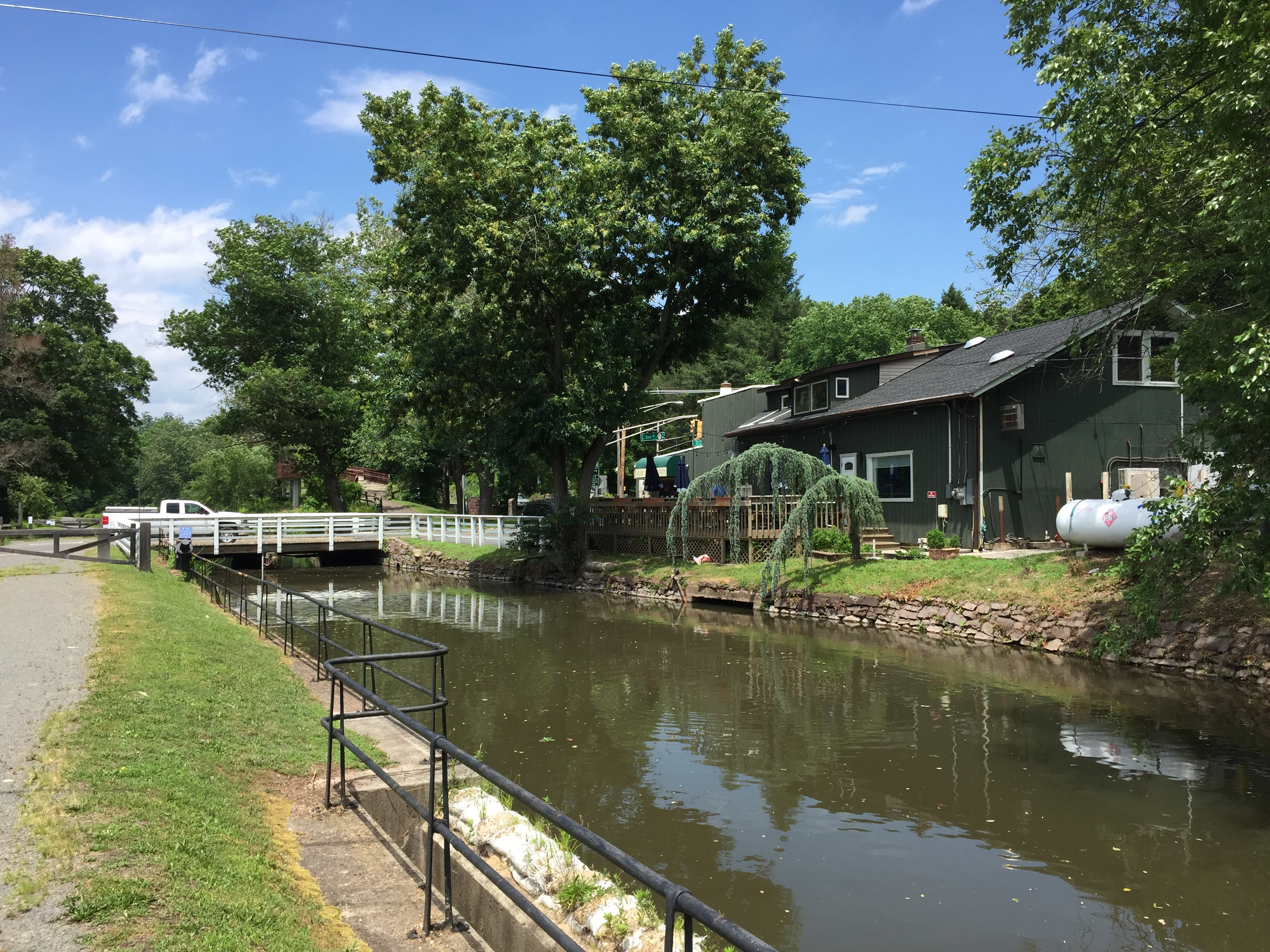
- The Delaware and Raritan Canal at Washington Crossing in Hopewell Township

- Location within Mercer County, New Jersey Location within New Jersey Location within the United States
- Coordinates: 40°17′48″N 74°52′01″W
- Country: United States
- State: New Jersey
- County: Mercer
- Township: Hopewell

Area
  - Total: 0.29 sq mi (0.75 km^{2})
  - Land: 0.25 sq mi (0.65 km^{2})
  - Water: 0.04 sq mi (0.10 km^{2})
- Elevation: 59 ft (18 m)

Population (2020)
  - Total: 371
  - Density: 1,478.1/sq mi (570.7/km^{2})
- ZIP Code: 08560 (Titusville)
- FIPS code: 34-77330
- GNIS feature ID: 881558

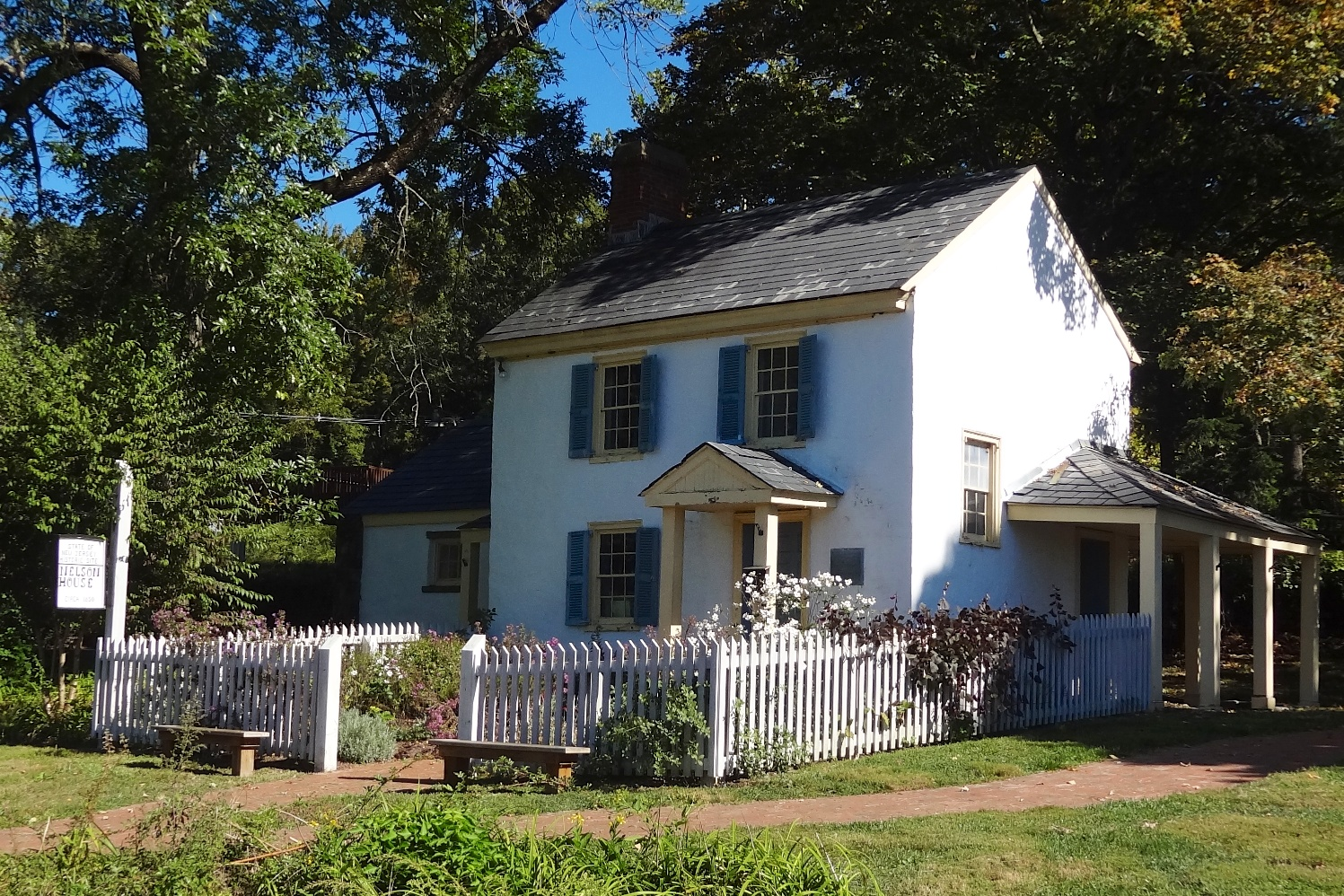
Nelson House

Washington Crossing is an unincorporated community and census-designated place (CDP) in Hopewell Township, Mercer County, New Jersey, in the United States. The CDP and surrounding Hopewell Township lie on the eastern flank of the Washington Crossing Bridge spanning the Delaware River. Washington Crossing State Park is located adjacent to the community in New Jersey, while across the river lies Washington Crossing Historic Park in Washington Crossing, Pennsylvania. As of the 2020 United States census, the CDP's population was 371.

The community was the eastern landing point following George Washington's crossing of the Delaware River on the night of December 25–26, 1776, during the American Revolutionary War. The Delaware and Raritan feeder canal runs along the river through the community.

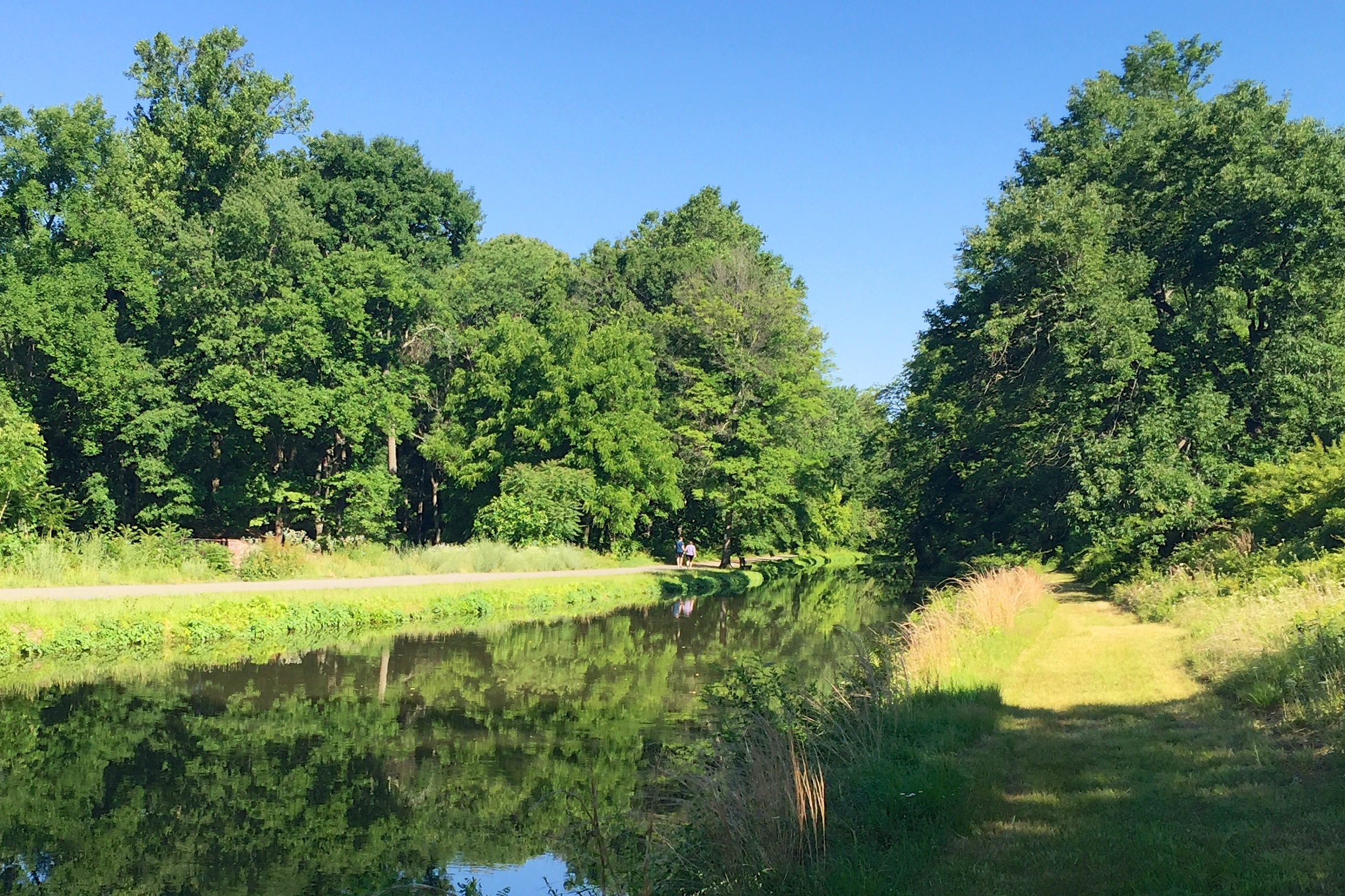
The Delaware and Raritan feeder canal and hiking trails

== Geography ==
Washington Crossing is on the east bank of the Delaware River in northwestern Mercer County. New Jersey Route 29 (River Road) passes through the community, leading southeast (downriver) 8 miles (13 km) to Trenton, the state capital, and northwest (upriver) 7 miles (11 km) to Lambertville. The Washington Crossing Bridge, built in 1904, crosses the Delaware to Washington Crossing, Pennsylvania, from where Pennsylvania Route 532 leads southwest 6 miles (10 km) to Newtown, Pennsylvania.

According to the United States Census Bureau, the CDP had a total area of 0.29 square miles (0.75 km^{2}), of which 0.25 square miles (0.65 km^{2}) were land and 0.04 square miles (0.10 km^{2}), or 14.6%, was water.

== Demographics ==
Historical population
Census	Pop.	Note	%±
2020	371		—
2020

Washington Crossing first appeared as a census designated place in the 2020 U.S. census.

Washington Crossing CDP, New Jersey – Racial and ethnic composition Note: the US Census treats Hispanic/Latino as an ethnic category. This table excludes Latinos from the racial categories and assigns them to a separate category. Hispanics/Latinos may be of any race.
Race / Ethnicity (NH = Non-Hispanic)	Pop 2020	2020
White alone (NH)	325	87.60%
Black or African American alone (NH)	5	1.35%
Native American or Alaska Native alone (NH)	0	0.00%
Asian alone (NH)	10	2.70%
Native Hawaiian or Pacific Islander alone (NH)	0	0.00%
Other race alone (NH)	1	0.27%
Mixed race or Multiracial (NH)	14	3.77%
Hispanic or Latino (any race)	16	4.31%
Total	371	100.00%

== Education ==
All of Hopewell Township, including Washington Crossing, is served by the Hopewell Valley Regional School District.

== Notable people ==
People who were born in, residents of, or otherwise closely associated with Washington Crossing include:

- William H. Blackwell (1882–1963), fruit farmer and politician

== See also ==
- Washington Crossing Historic Park in Pennsylvania
