= William H. Blackwell =

American politician

- Born: July 22, 1882; Washington Crossing, New Jersey, U.S.
- Died: November 3, 1963 (aged 81); St. Petersburg, Florida, U.S.
- Occupations: Fruit farmer, politician
- Political party: Republican
- Spouse: Bertha Allen (m. 1905)
- Children: Warren Allen

William Hartwell Blackwell (July 22, 1882 – November 3, 1963) was an American fruit farmer and politician from New Jersey.

== Life ==
Blackwell was born on July 22, 1882, in Washington Crossing, New Jersey. His family homestead later became property of the state of New Jersey to be used as a park to commemorate the Crossing of the Delaware. He was the son of fruit farmer Charles Ely Blackwell and Sarah Elizabeth Hartwell.

Blackwell attended the Hopewell Township public school and graduated from the State Model School in 1901. He then grew fruit in Titusville, and by 1919 he became one of the largest producers of Bartlett pears in the state of New Jersey. He was elected president of the Mercer County Board of Agriculture three times, and in that position he reorganized the Board and brought it closer with the State Board of Agriculture and the Office of Farm Demonstration.

In 1918, Blackwell was elected to the New Jersey General Assembly as a Republican. He was one of the three assembly members from Mercer County. He served in the Assembly in 1919, 1920, and 1921. In 1922, he was elected to the New Jersey Senate as a Republican, representing Mercer County. He served in the Senate in 1923, 1924, and 1925. He was later elected to the New Jersey Republican State Committee for two terms. He retired in 1955, after which he moved to St. Petersburg, Florida.

Blackwell was president of the Pleasant Valley Vigilant Society and a member of the New Jersey State Horticultural Society, the Freemasons, the Scottish Rite, and the Shriners. He was involved in the Grange and served as Master of the Titusville Grange, a member of the Mercer County Pomona Grange, and an executive committee member of the New Jersey State Grange. He was also president of the New Jersey Sons of the Revolution. In 1905, he married Bertha Allen. They had one child, Warren Allen.

Blackwell died in St. Petersburg on November 3, 1963. He was buried in the Titusville Methodist Church Cemetery.
