= Washington Crossing State Park =

- U.S. National Register of Historic Places
- U.S. National Historic Landmark
- New Jersey Register of Historic Places
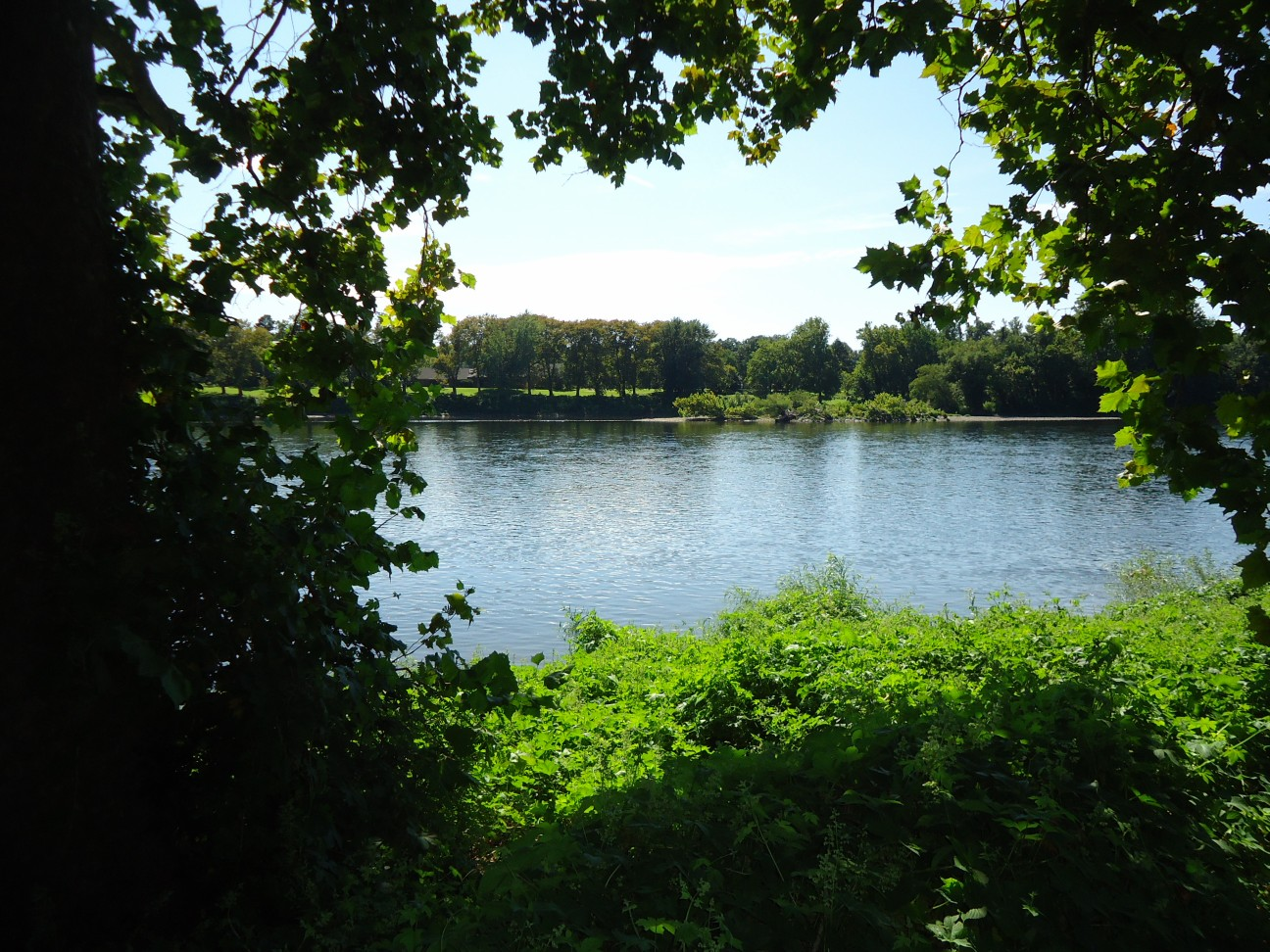
- Crossing site, from the New Jersey side, looking west to Pennsylvania across the Delaware River.

- Location within Mercer County, New Jersey Location within New Jersey Location within the United States
- Location: Hopewell Township, Mercer County, New Jersey
- Nearest city: Titusville, New Jersey and Trenton, New Jersey
- Coordinates: 40°18′40″N 74°51′49″W
- Area: 3,575 acres (1,447 ha)
- NRHP reference No.: 66000650
- NJRHP No.: 1706

Significant dates
- Added to NRHP: October 15, 1966
- Designated NHL: January 20, 1961
- Designated NJRHP: May 27, 1971

Washington Crossing State Park is a 3,575-acre (14 km^{2}) New Jersey state park that is part of Washington's Crossing, a U.S. National Historic Landmark area. It is located in the Washington Crossing and Titusville sections of Hopewell Township in Mercer County, north of Trenton along the Delaware River. The park is operated and maintained by the New Jersey Division of Parks and Forestry. It is supported by the Washington Crossing Park Association, a friends group that works to preserve, enhance, and advocate for the park.

This park area, together with Washington Crossing Historic Park on the Pennsylvania side, comprise the Washington's Crossing National Historic Landmark, which was listed on January 20, 1961, and added to the National Register of Historic Places on October 15, 1966.

The park's natural area consists of 140 acres (0.57 km^{2}) of mixed hardwood forests and fields that offer locations for hiking, picnics, nature walks and cross-country skiing. The Nature Center offers exhibits, displays, and educational programs for children, families and school groups. During warmer months, concerts and plays were once held at the Washington Crossing Open Air Theatre, an outdoor theater with seating consisting of wooden benches and a stage, but this facility has been abandoned since 2017.

Goat Hill Overlook, located nearby in West Amwell Township in Hunterdon County, is administered by the New Jersey Division of Parks and Forestry as part of Washington Crossing State Park.

== Johnson's Ferry ==
The park includes the site of George Washington's crossing of the Delaware River at Johnson's Ferry. This is where George Washington and a 2,400-man detachment of the Continental Army crossed the river overnight on December 25, 1776, and into the morning of December 26, 1776, to make a surprise attack on Trenton, a move that would prove to be a turning point in the American Revolutionary War. The corresponding ferry on the Pennsylvania side of the Delaware River was known as McConkey's Ferry.

The Johnson Ferry House, an 18th-century farmhouse and tavern near the Delaware River, was owned by Garret Johnson, who operated a 490-acre (2.0 km^{2}) plantation and a ferry service across the Delaware. It was likely used by General Washington and other officers at the time of the crossing. Several rooms are furnished with period pieces, and an 18th-century kitchen garden has been planted. On weekends, living-history demonstrations are frequently held.

== Nelson House ==
Built c. 1850, the Nelson House, also known as the Alexander Nelson Tavern, is located near the landing site on the Delaware River and is used for park history demonstrations. The house includes period furnishings and old photographs of railroad and canal transportation.

== Washington Crossing Visitor Center Museum ==
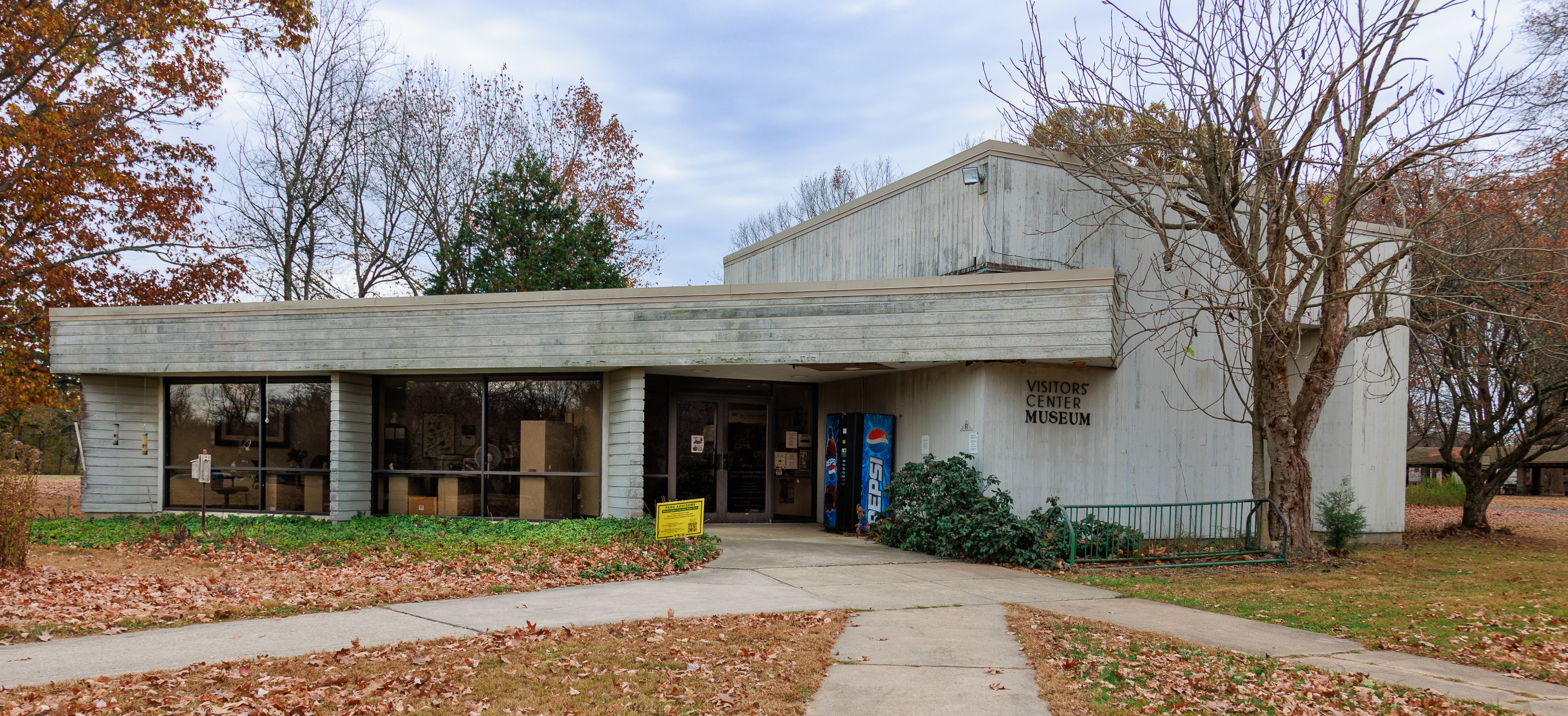
Visitors center museum

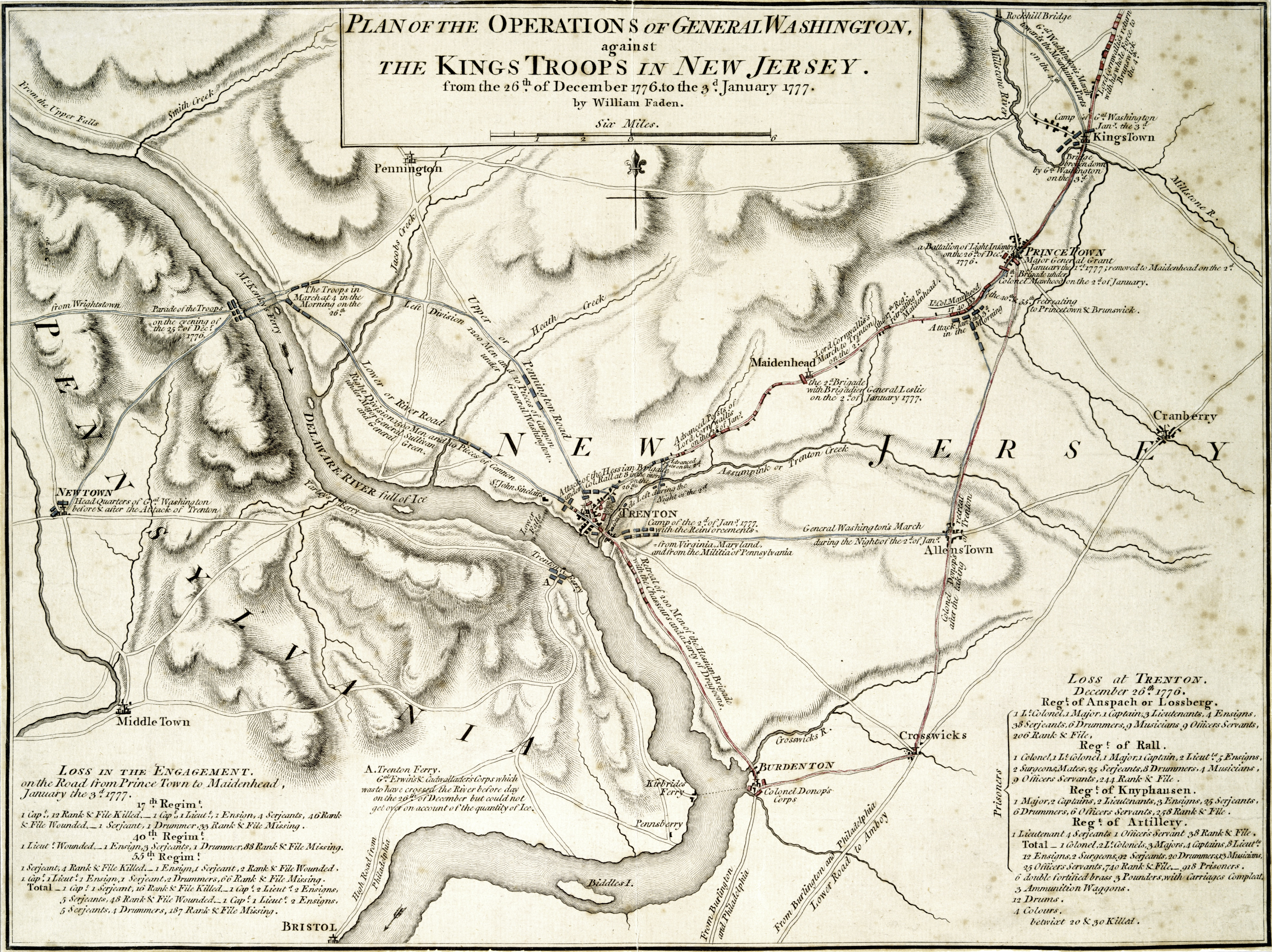
Military map by William Faden with troop movements during the Ten Crucial Days

The Washington Crossing Visitor Center Museum focuses on the American Revolution and the military campaign known as the "Ten Crucial Days" from December 25, 1776, through January 3, 1777. During this time, the George Washington and the Continental Army crossed the Delaware River, and fought at the Battle of Trenton, the Battle of the Assunpink Creek, and the Battle of Princeton. It features the Harry Kels Swan Collection of Revolutionary War artifacts. Over 700 military items from the American and British Armies are included in the collection. The center also includes interpretive history exhibits that cover the Revolutionary War from its prelude in 1758 to the signing of the Treaty of Paris in 1783.

== Nature Center and Observatory ==
The Washington Crossing State Park Nature Center offers nature education programs are for schools, youth groups, community organizations, and visitors to the park. The center is open Wednesday through Sunday, year round.

Nearby is the John W. H. Simpson Observatory, which is operated by the Amateur Astronomers Association of Princeton. The observatory houses two telescopes: a 6.25-inch Hastings-Byrne refractor and a 14-inch SCT. The observatory is open for public observing led by association volunteers on Friday nights April through October from 8 to 11 pm, weather permitting.

== Goat Hill Overlook ==
Goat Hill Overlook is a 213-acre (0.86 km^{2}) scenic preserve administered as part of nearby Washington Crossing State Park. The New Jersey Department of Environmental Protection's Green Acres program purchased the Goat Hill Overlook property in 2009 for $4.5 million from Constructural Dynamics Inc. of Fairless Hills, Pennsylvania. The company acquired Goat Hill Overlook from the Boy Scouts in 1983 and originally intended to use the land for mining operations. That plan was later changed in favor of constructing a residential development complex at the site. In addition to views of the Delaware River, the property features a prominent rock, known as Washington Rock. According to local legend, General Washington used the views from Goat Hill Overlook to assess battle conditions during the Revolutionary War. The site also offers miles of hiking trails and contains a variety of wildlife and plant species.

== Gallery ==
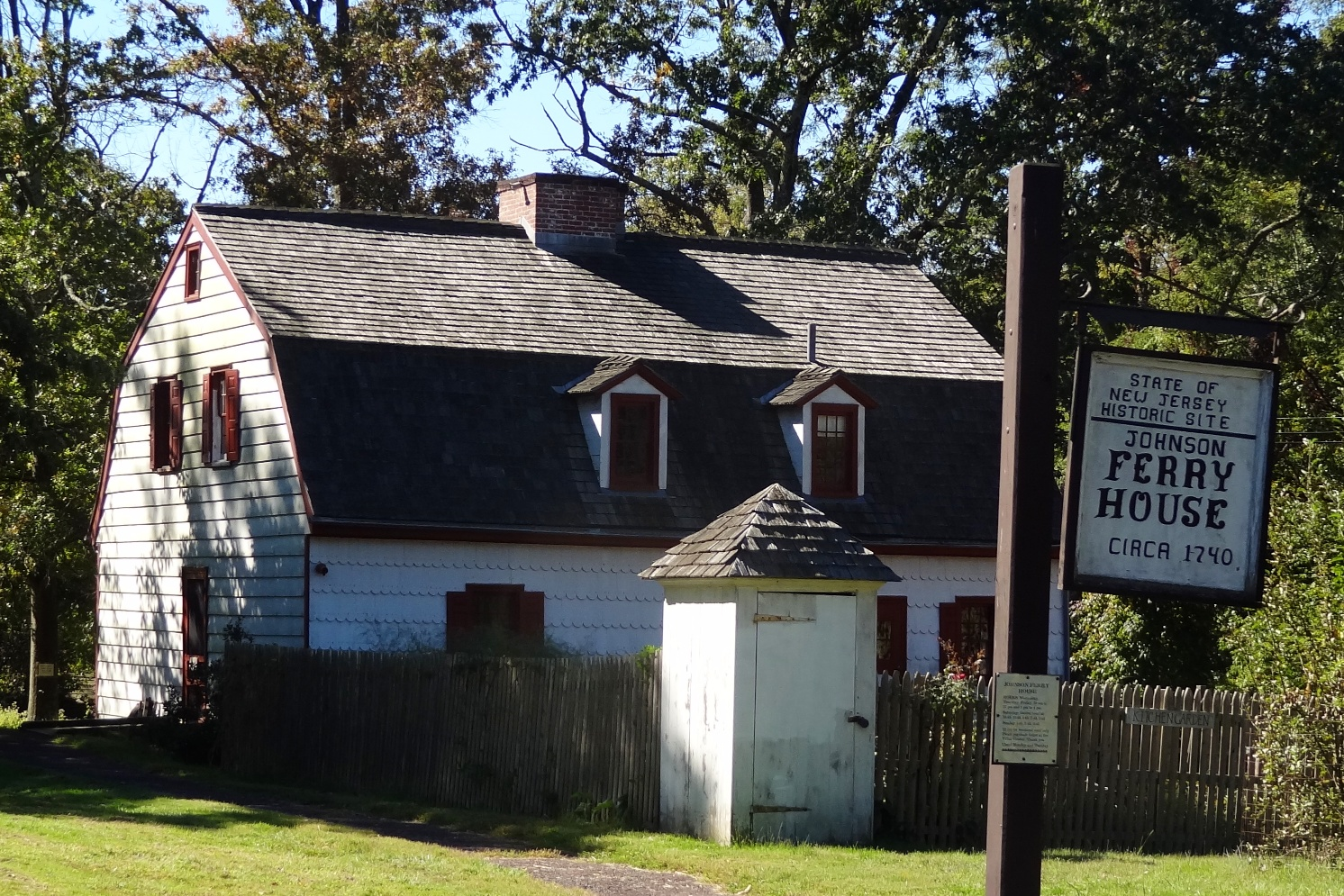
Johnson Ferry House

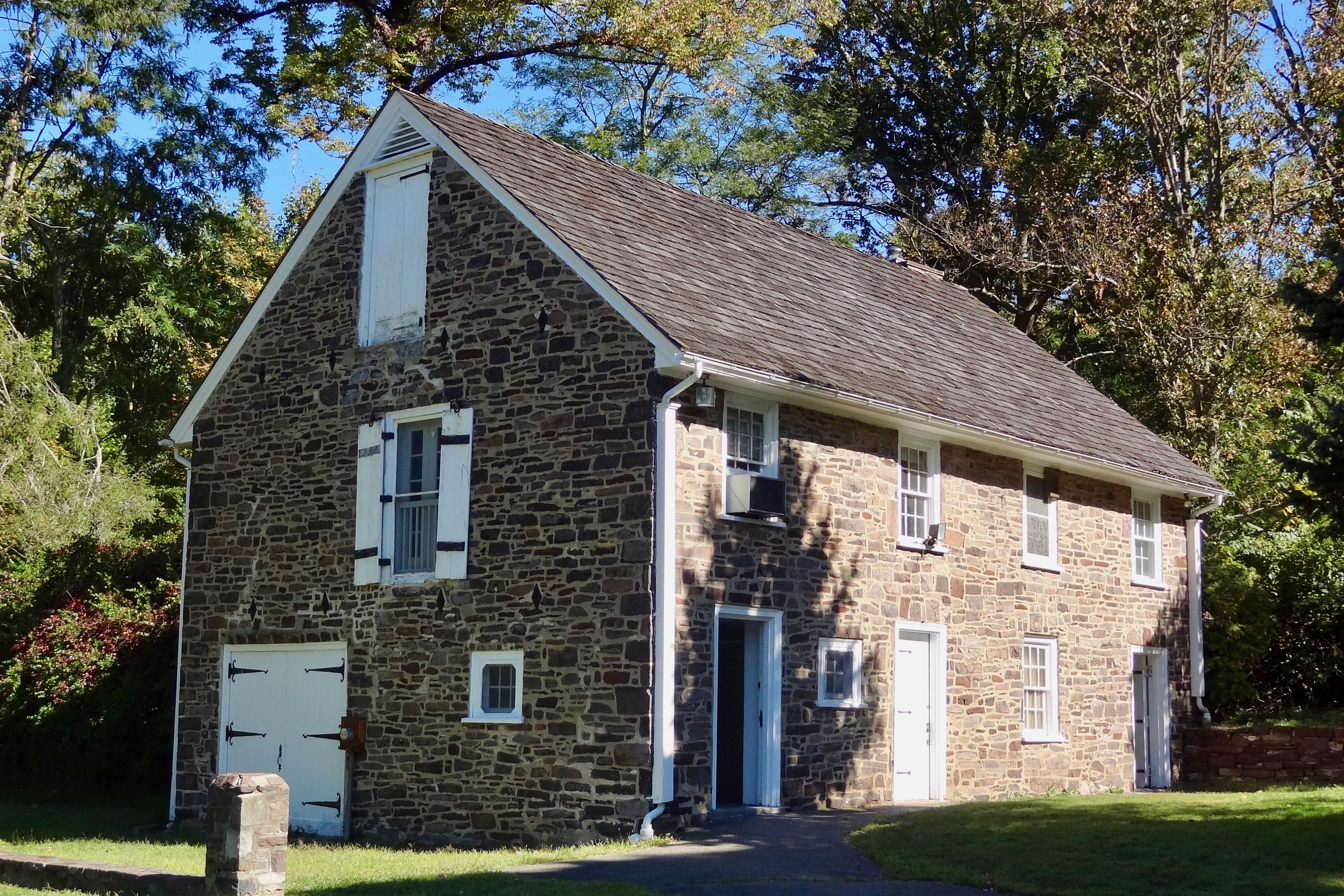
Stone barn by the Johnson Ferry House

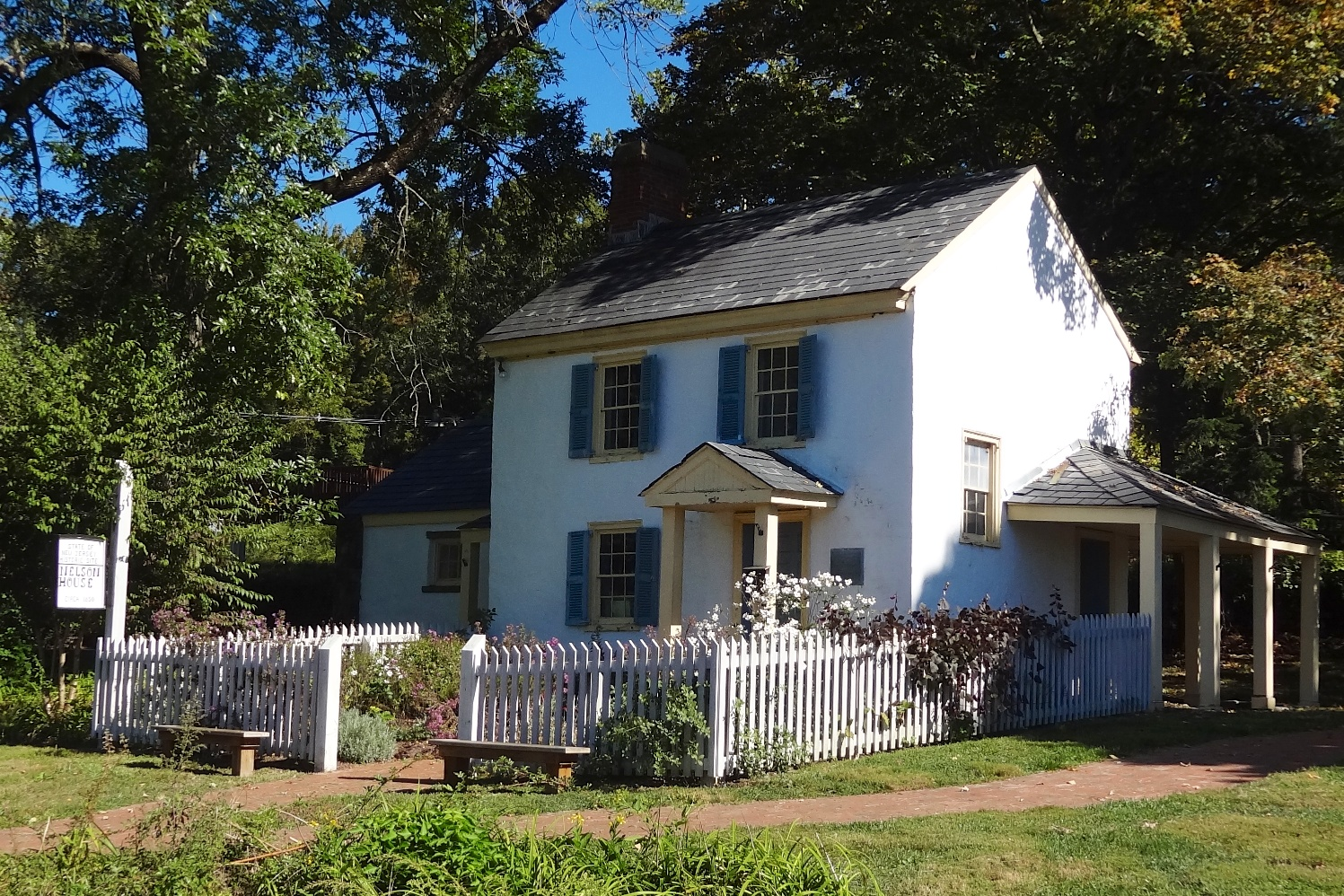
Nelson House

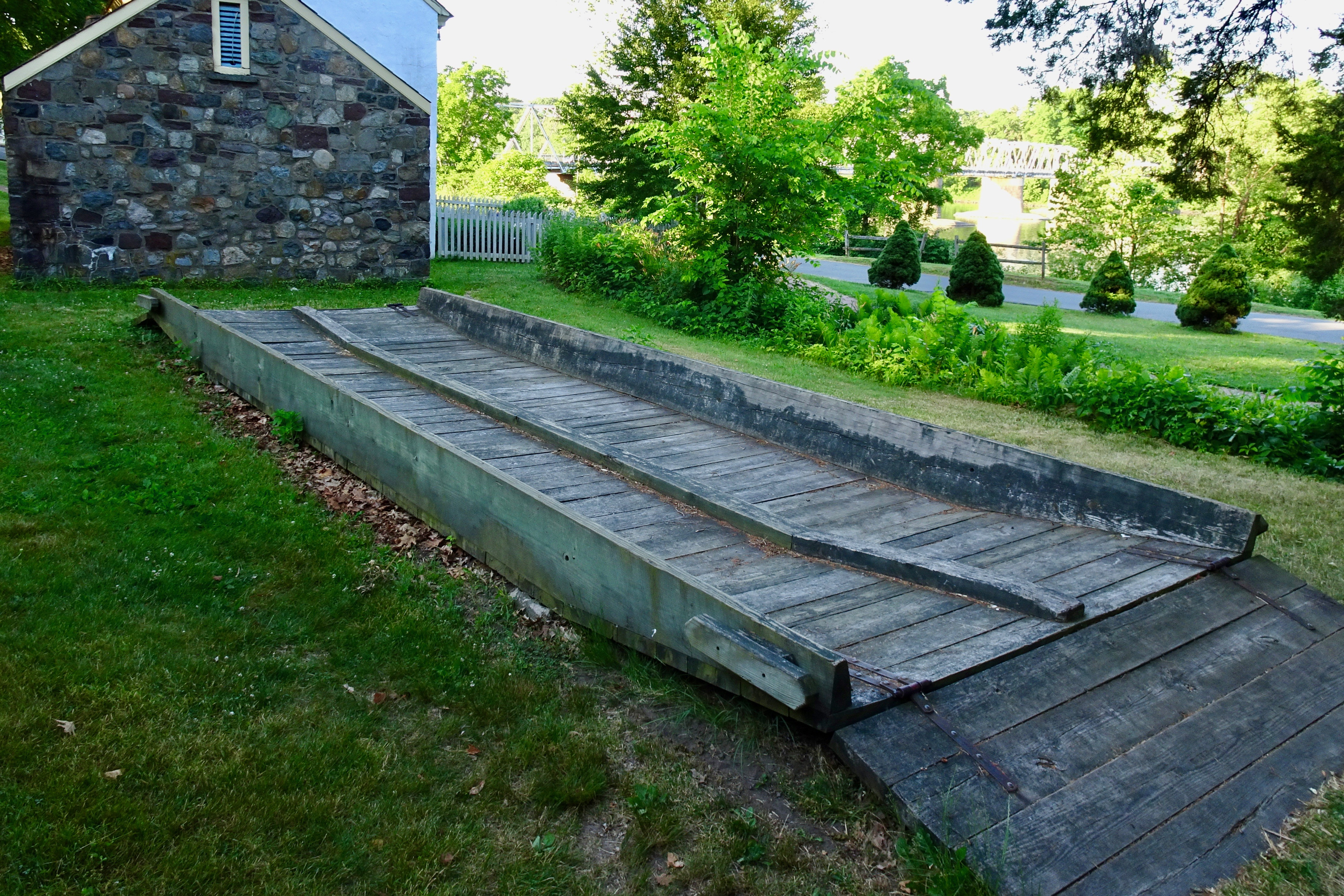
Ferry boat reproduction

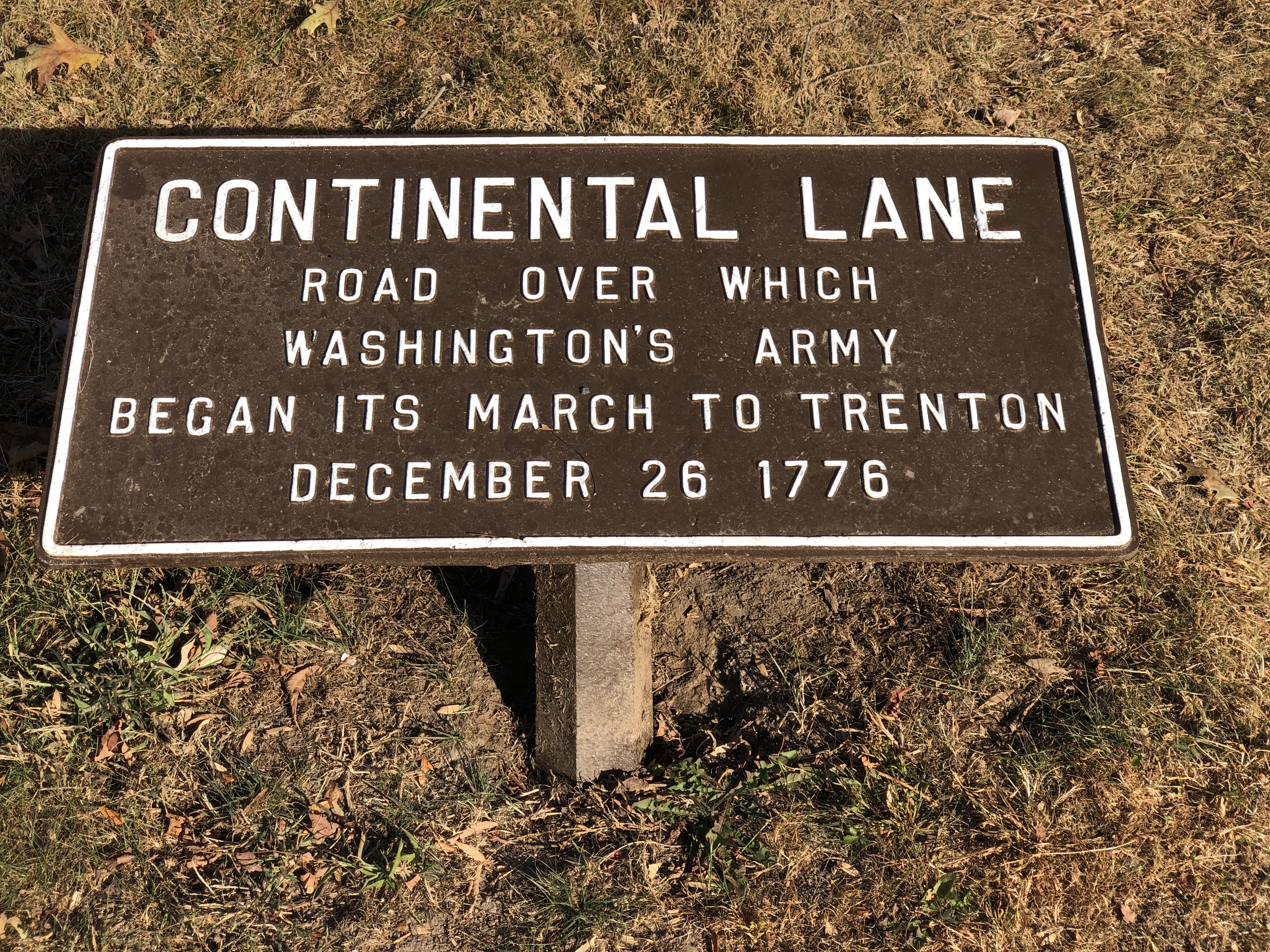
Sign marking Continental Army route.

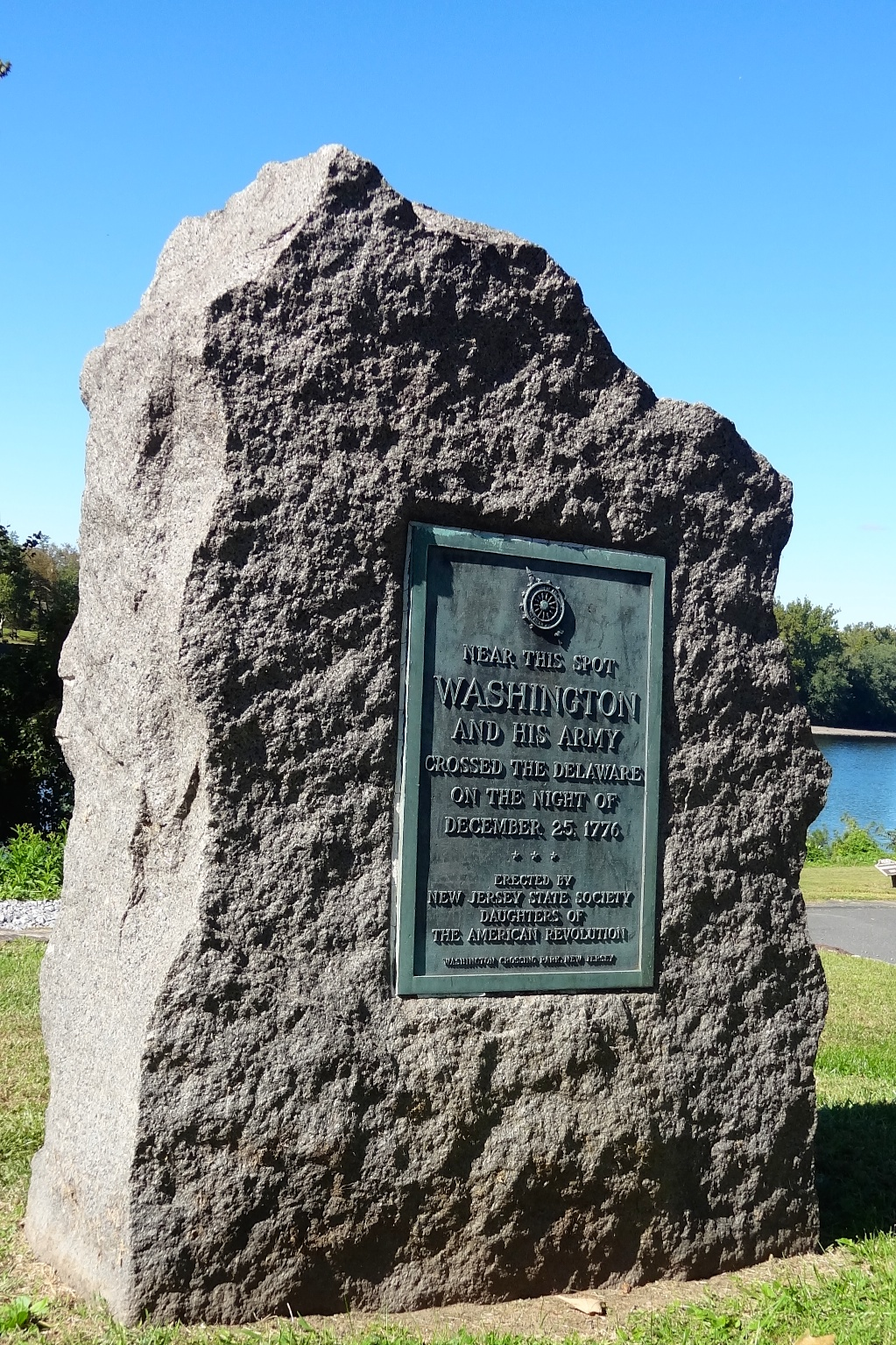
Monument near the crossing site

== See also ==
- List of New Jersey state parks
- National Register of Historic Places listings in Mercer County, New Jersey
