= Washington Crossing Bridge =

Delaware River road bridge

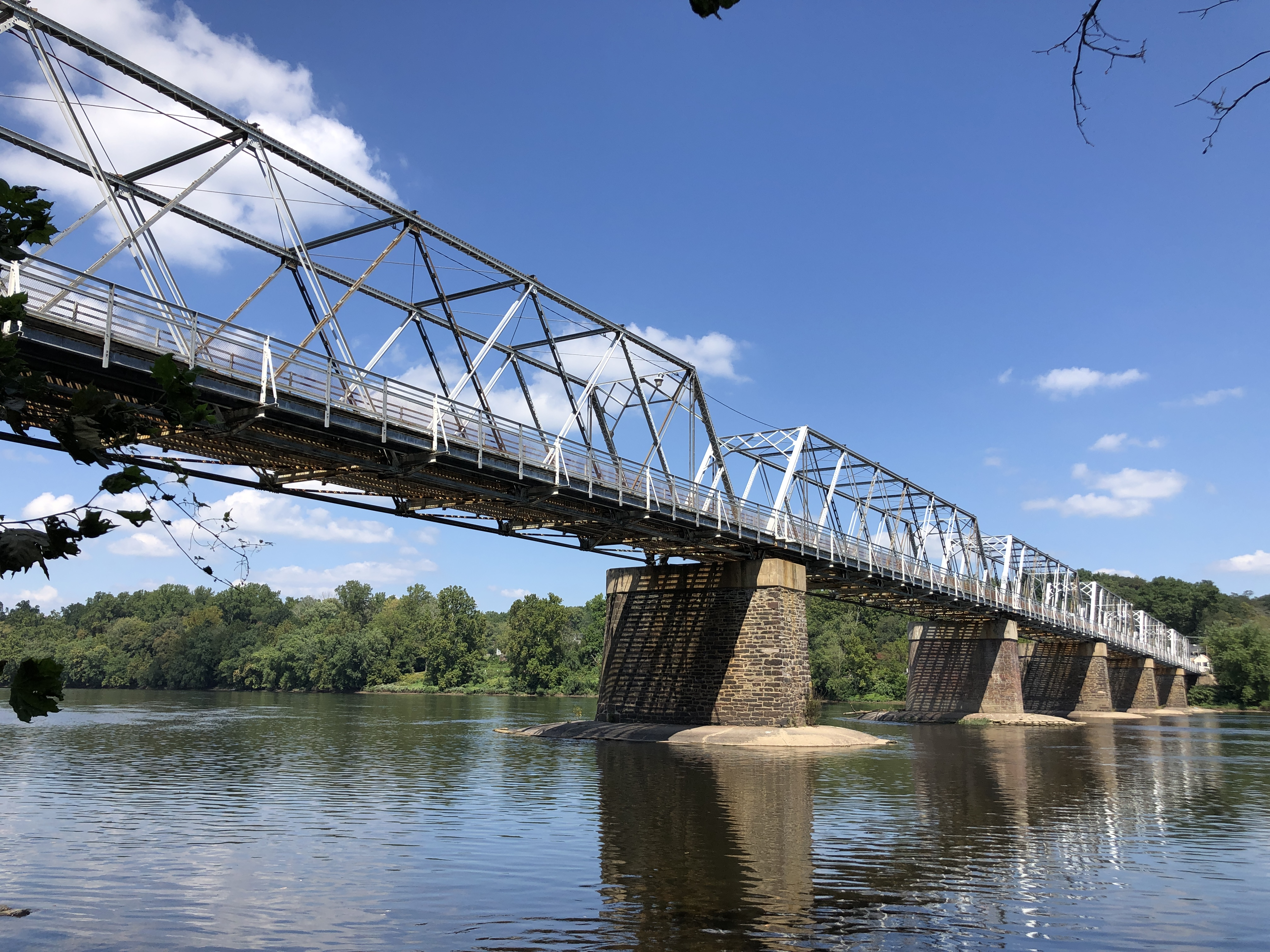
- Coordinates: 40°17′43″N 74°52′5″W
- Carries: 2 lanes of vehicular traffic, and pedestrians
- Crosses: Delaware River
- Locale: Washington Crossing section of Hopewell Township, New Jersey and Washington Crossing section of Upper Makefield Township, Pennsylvania
- Official name: Washington Crossing Toll Supported Bridge
- Maintained by: Delaware River Joint Toll Bridge Commission

Characteristics
- Design: Truss bridge
- Total length: 877 feet (267 m)
- Width: 15 feet (5 m)
- Longest span: 143 feet (44 m)
- Load limit: 3 tons
- Clearance above: 8 feet (2 m)

History
- Opened: 1831; 195 years ago
- Rebuilt: 1840s, April 11, 1905

Statistics
- Daily traffic: 7,000
- Toll: None

Location
- Interactive map of Washington Crossing Bridge

Washington Crossing Bridge (officially the Washington Crossing Toll Supported Bridge) is a truss bridge spanning the Delaware River that connects Washington Crossing, Hopewell Township in Mercer County, New Jersey with Washington Crossing, Upper Makefield Township in Bucks County, Pennsylvania. It was built in 1904 by the Taylorsville Delaware Bridge Company. It serves as the connector of Pennsylvania Route 532 on the Pennsylvania side, with County Route 546 on the New Jersey side. The bridge is currently owned and operated by the Delaware River Joint Toll Bridge Commission.

== Structure ==
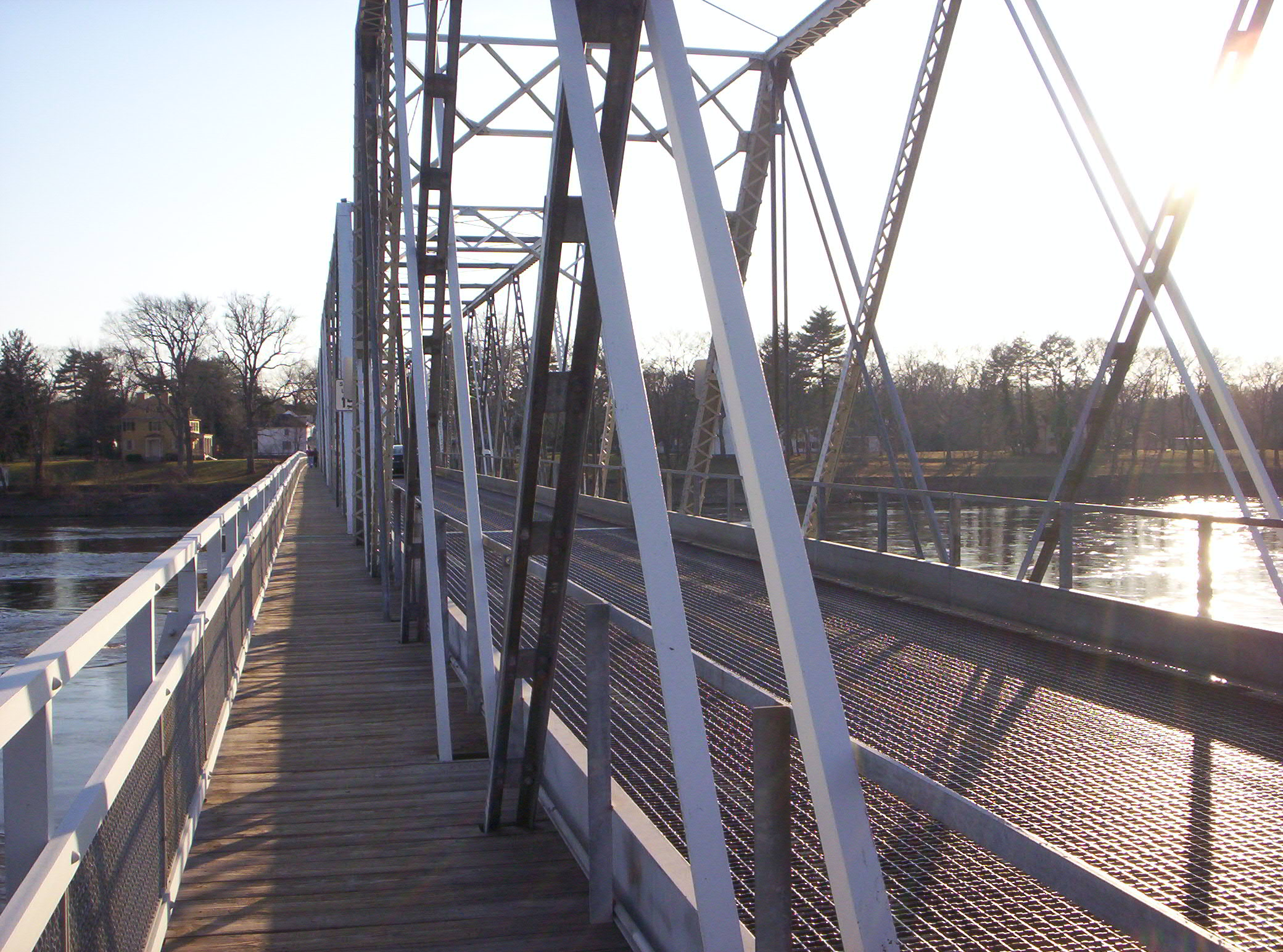
A view of the bridge from the walkway

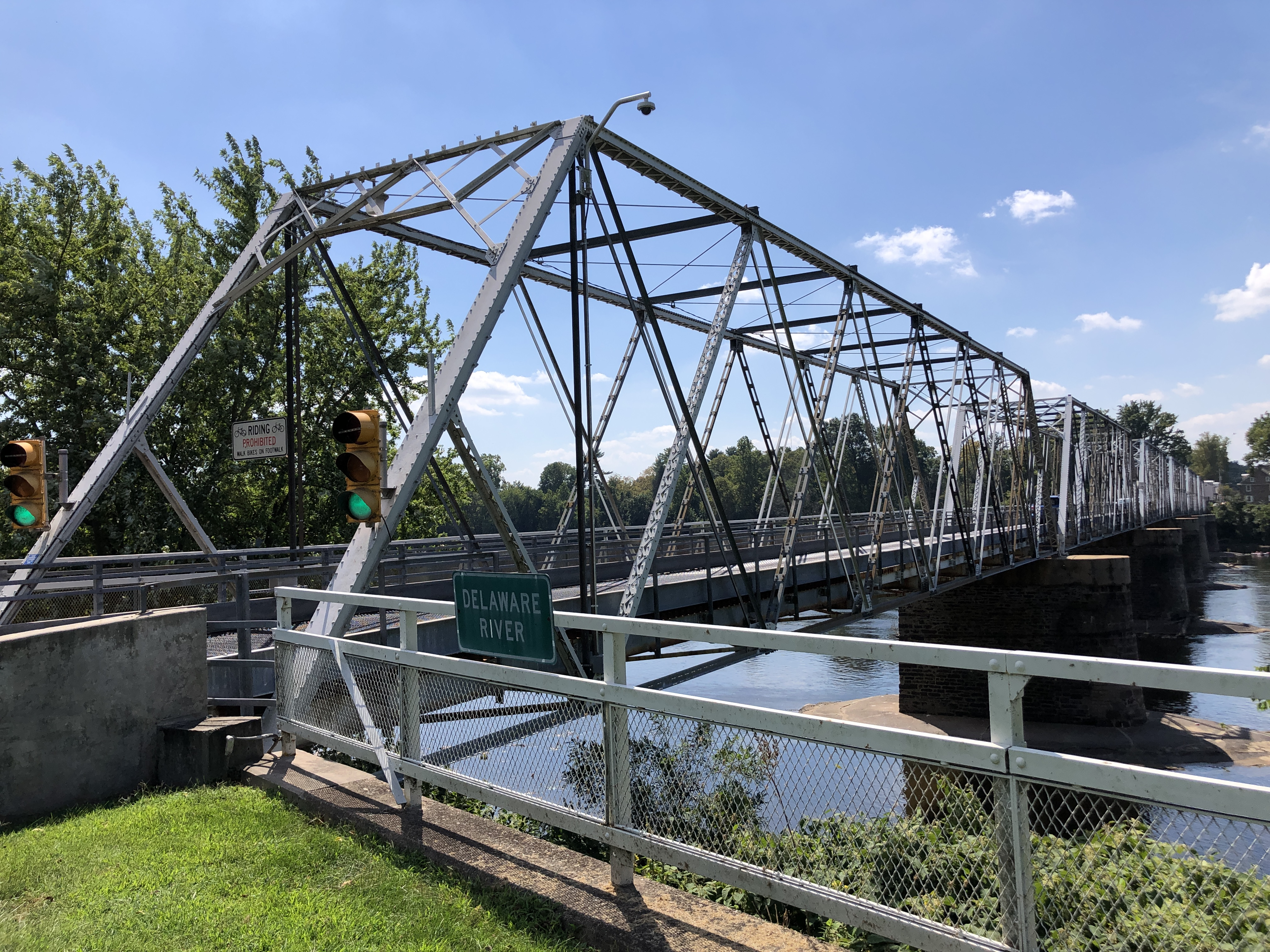
The bridge's truss members joining the upper chords

Washington Crossing Bridge is a six-span double Warren truss structure measuring 877 feet (267 m) in length. Its riveted-steel grid deck provides a roadway width of 15 feet (4.6 m). The roadway is made of a grate.The bridge's substructures, composed of rubble stone-faced masonry, are from the original 1831 bridge, while its superstructure dates to 1904. Five piers (one of which has been faced with mortar) and two abutments support the bridge.

== History ==
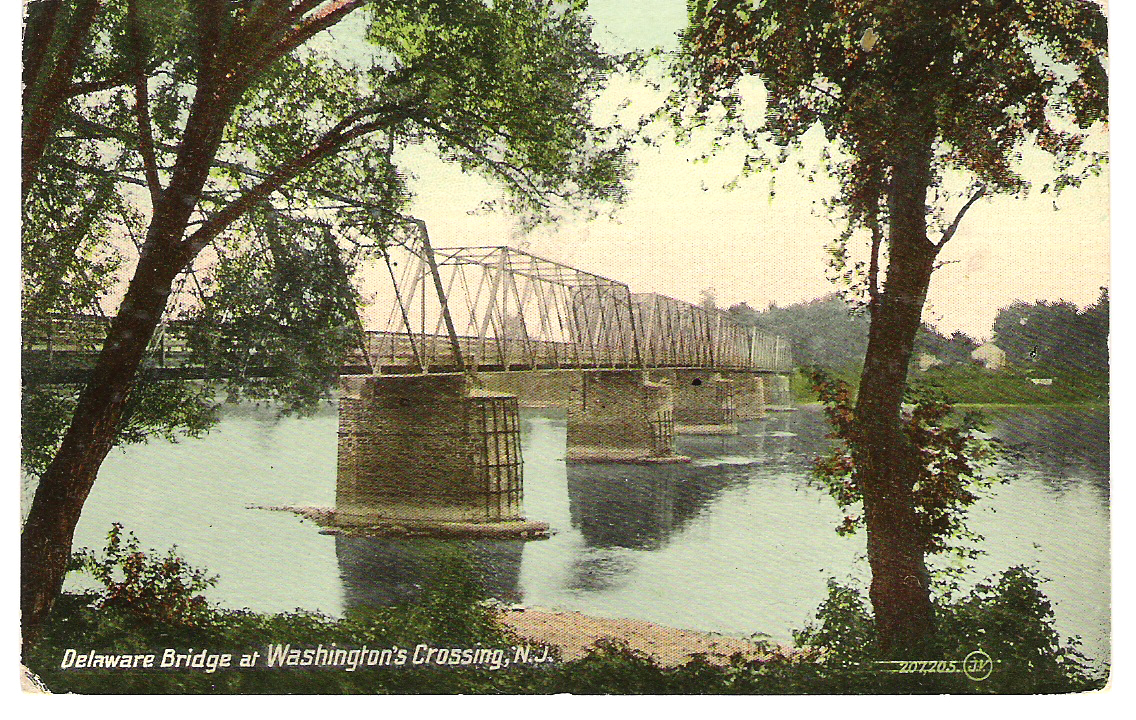
An early 20th century postcard depicting Washington Crossing Bridge

Men from both sides of the river endeavored in the early 1830s to secure charters from the two states to form a company that then sold shares of stock to raise capital for constructing a bridge at the former McKonkey Ferry location. Resulting legislation to establish the Taylorsville Delaware Bridge Company was enacted by New Jersey on February 14, 1831 and by Pennsylvania on April 1, 1831. The legislative measures named Mahlon K. Taylor, Aaron Feaster and Enos Morris of Pennsylvania and Daniel Cooke, Esq., James B. Green, and Joseph Titus of New Jersey to sell the fledgling bridge company’s stock shares. In the summer of 1833, the bridge company posted a series of legal advertisements seeking contractors to build the envisioned bridge. The resulting bridge was “thrown open for crossing” on January 1, 1835. A newspaper item from that time stated: “We don’t know the rates of Toll, but have understood that from favorable terms upon which the bridge has been built, the Directors will be able to place the charges for toll at a very moderate rate.” On February 14, 1831, an act was passed by the New Jersey Legislature and concurred by the Pennsylvania General Assembly, creating the Taylorsville Delaware Bridge Company. By the act's provisions, a bridge was to be located at Taylor's Ferry, close to where George Washington crossed the Delaware River in 1776. This timber bridge was constructed beginning in 1831 and was completed in 1834. Its six spans gave it a total length of 875 feet. It was the first bridge to open between the New Hope Delaware Bridge Company span to the north and the Trenton Delaware Bridge Company span to the south. Its six spans gave it a total length of 875 feet. The structure design is generally believed to have been a Town’s Lattice Bridge, a design patented by Ithiel Town of Connecticut. It was a toll bridge. The first bridge had its superstructure swept away by a flood on January 8, 1841. The bridge company replaced its obliterated structure, the completion and opening date of which is unknown. An early 20th century letter to the editor states that the post 1841-flood replacement bridge consisted largely of retrieved lattice truss panels of the first bridge, which washed ashore downstream after the flood. The new superstructure was a standard covered bridge, typical for the time. The bridge was again a toll bridge. The bridge underwent significant repair after a flood damaged it in 1902. The first bridge remained in service until it was swept away by the flood of January 8, 1841. A replacement bridge was constructed shortly afterward and remained in service until it was carried away by the flood of October 10, 1903. In 1904, the bridge's current steel superstructure was built.

The Joint Commission for Elimination of Toll Bridges (usually Joint Commission for short) was founded in 1916, with the goal of removing private toll fares from the bridges on the Delaware River. New Jersey and Pennsylvania co-purchased the privately funded toll bridge in 1922, the last toll was served on April 25, 1922, from a man by the name of Theodore Scheetz. The purchase was completed by May 2, 1922. The DRJTBC bought the private toll bridge in 1922, the last toll was served on April 25, 1922, from a man by the name of Theodore Scheetz.

In 1923, multiple deficiencies due to expected poor maintenance were discovered, because of this, new wood planks were installed on the bridge, stringers were replaced, the lighting system was upgraded, and repairs were made to the piers. They also later attempted to improve the bridge’s approaches.

The cantilever wood planked pedestrian sidewalk was added in 1926.

In late December 1934, the states disbanded the Joint Commission and established the Delaware River Joint Toll Bridge Commission (“the Bridge Commission”) with an expanded mission of building new “superhighway” toll bridges. The new Bridge Commission was assigned the old Joint Commission’s responsibility of caring for the bridge with equal annual tax subsidies from the two states

The New Jersey approach was reconstructed in 1947.

The roadway was re-decked in 1951, with the wood planking replaced by steel, which is more resistant to elements such as snow and liquid. This change enabled the bridge’s roadway to be widened 15 feet, with 7.5 foot lanes in each direction.

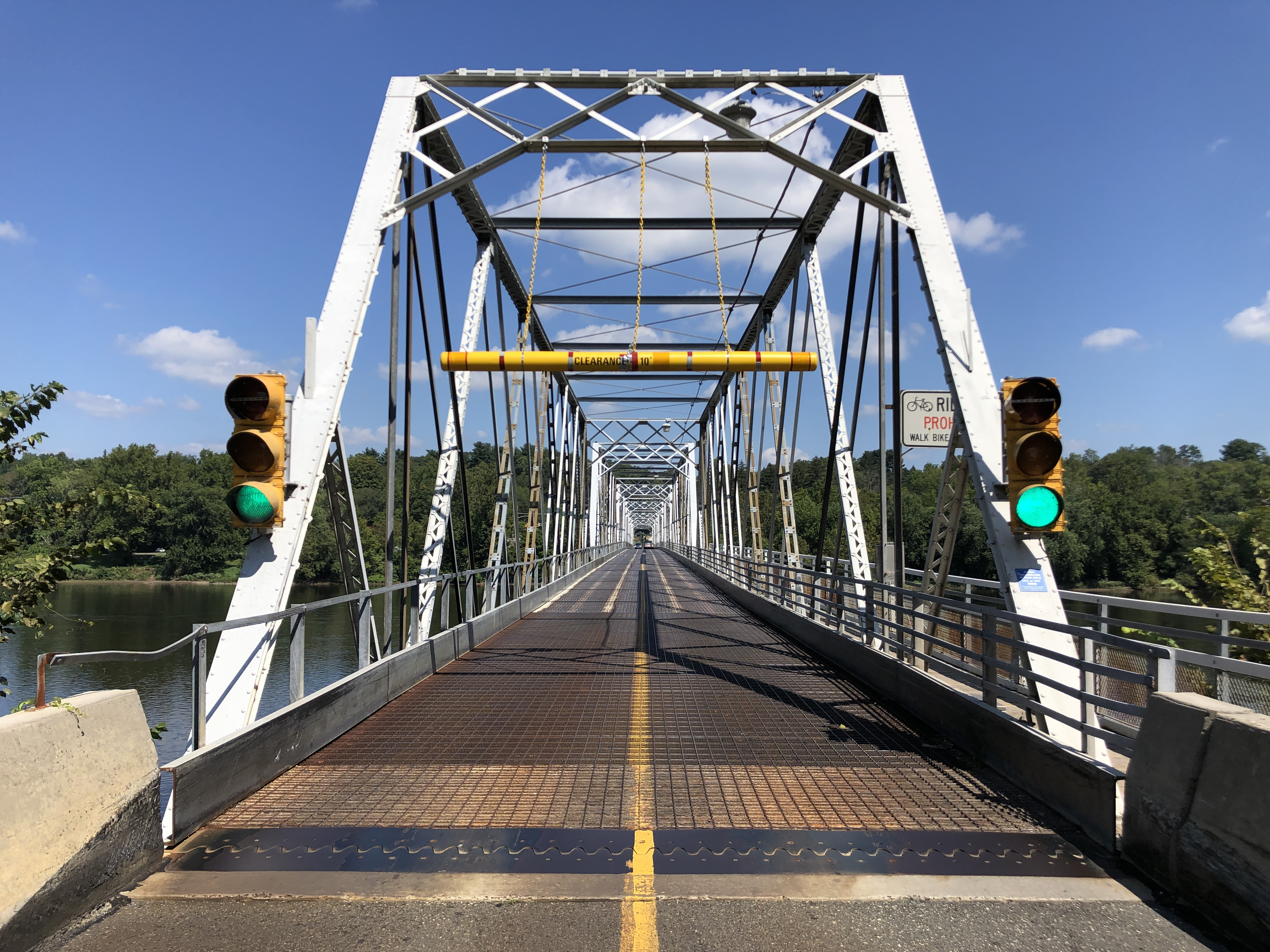
The Pennsylvania approach to Washington Crossing Bridge

The flood of August 19, 1955, did considerable damage to Washington Crossing Bridge. Floating debris in the form of whole trees, steel barrels and even houses smashed against the bridge, resulting in damage to all six spans. More than half the bridge's bottom chords were bent or twisted beyond repair. These members were replaced with new fabricated steel members and the bridge was reopened to traffic on November 17, 1955. On July 1, 1987, the bridges maintenance responsibility was transitioned over entirely to the Delaware River Joint toll Commission. This resulted in the bridge being renamed to the Washington Crossing Toll Supported Bridge.

During the fall of 1994, the bridge underwent an extensive structural rehabilitation. As described by the Delaware River Joint Toll Bridge Commission, many truss members were replaced with new fabricated galvanized steel. Floor system members and the open steel grid deck were replaced in the first three bays of each end span. All remaining structural steel was blast cleaned, metallized, and painted. A new wooden sidewalk was installed and renovations were made at both approaches to the bridge.

In July 2004, height bars were installed to prevent overweight vehicles from traveling onto the bridge.

The remnants of Hurricane Ivan caused heavy rainfall on September 17 and 18 of 2004; 3 to 5 inches (76 to 127 mm) fell over a 12-hour period. Flood peaks along the main section of the Delaware River were the highest since the flood of 1955. The bridge was temporarily closed.

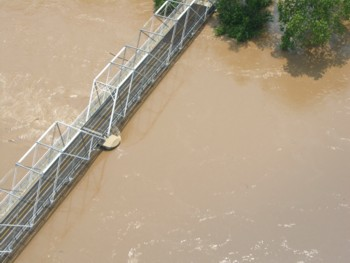
Washington Crossing Bridge during a flood in late June 2006

Unusually heavy rains experienced in late March 2005 and early April 2005 combined with melting snow resulted in another flood. One of the piers of Washington Crossing Bridge had its masonry core exposed after being battered by a floating object. In the aftermath of the flood, the Delaware River Joint Toll Bridge Commission requested $500,000 in emergency flood repairs. Although the bridge remained opened for a short time following the flooding, it was closed on April 7, 2005, when receding flood waters revealed the extent of the damage to the pier. The bridge was reopened to continuous traffic on May 4, 2005, although it was closed for nighttime repairs beginning May 18.

In 2006, the Delaware River experienced 3 to 6.5 inches (76 to 165 mm) of rain from June 23 to June 28. The river's peak levels were comparable to those of the April 2005 flood. Washington Crossing Bridge was closed until July 1, when it reopened to vehicular and pedestrian traffic at 10:15 a.m.

In 2010, the bridge was closed for 46 days in late fall to undergo an extensive rehabilitation. This included replacing the singular non-standard lane control signals with a dual pair of standard traffic signals, adding scour protection to the piers, re-decking the pedestrian sidewalk, installing aesthetic treatments on the second pier, improving the pedestrian walkways railing, installing updated signage, repairing the bridge’s light fixtures, and repairing the Pennsylvania masonry abutment, which had notably exhibited severe bulging. On May 4, 2018, the bridge was damaged when an over height truck drove over the bridge. Emergency repairs were completed by that evening.

== Replacement ==
In January 2024, the DRJTBC issued a Request for Proposals (RFP) for a consultant team which would start the process of environmental review, in preparation for possibly designing and constructing a replacement span. The current span was built in 1905 and with a road deck width of just 15 feet (4.6 m), lanes only 7.5 feet (2.3 m) wide and a weight limit of 3 tons, it is considered "operationally challenged" with frequent minor accidents.

== See also ==
- List of crossings of the Delaware River
