= Washington Crossing, Pennsylvania =

Unincorporated community in Pennsylvania, US

- Unincorporated community
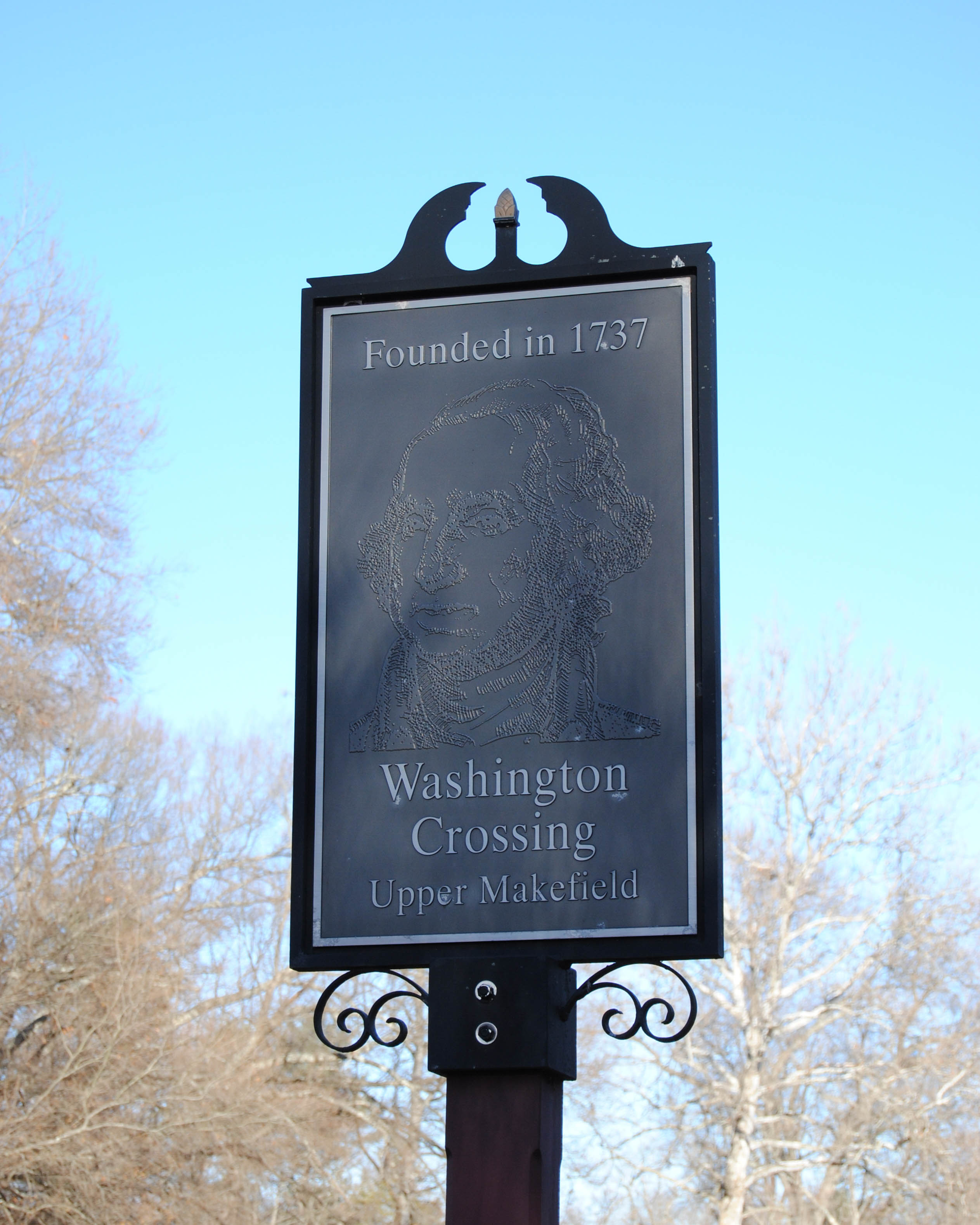
- Photo of a sign saying Washington Crossing Upper Makefield, Founded in 1737 - formerly the Village of Taylorsville, Pennsylvania

- Location within Pennsylvania Location within the United States
- Coordinates: 40°17′36″N 74°52′14″W
- Country: United States
- State: Pennsylvania
- County: Bucks
- Township: Upper Makefield
- Elevation: 56 ft (17 m)
- Time zone: UTC-5 (Eastern (EST))
  - Summer (DST): UTC-4 (EDT)
- ZIP Code: 18977
- Area codes: 215, 267, and 445
- GNIS feature ID: 1190624

Washington Crossing, Pennsylvania is an unincorporated village located in Upper Makefield Township, Pennsylvania, United States. Formerly known as "Taylorsville," it is most famous for being the western launch point for George Washington's crossing of the Delaware River on the night of December 25–26, 1776 during the Revolutionary War.

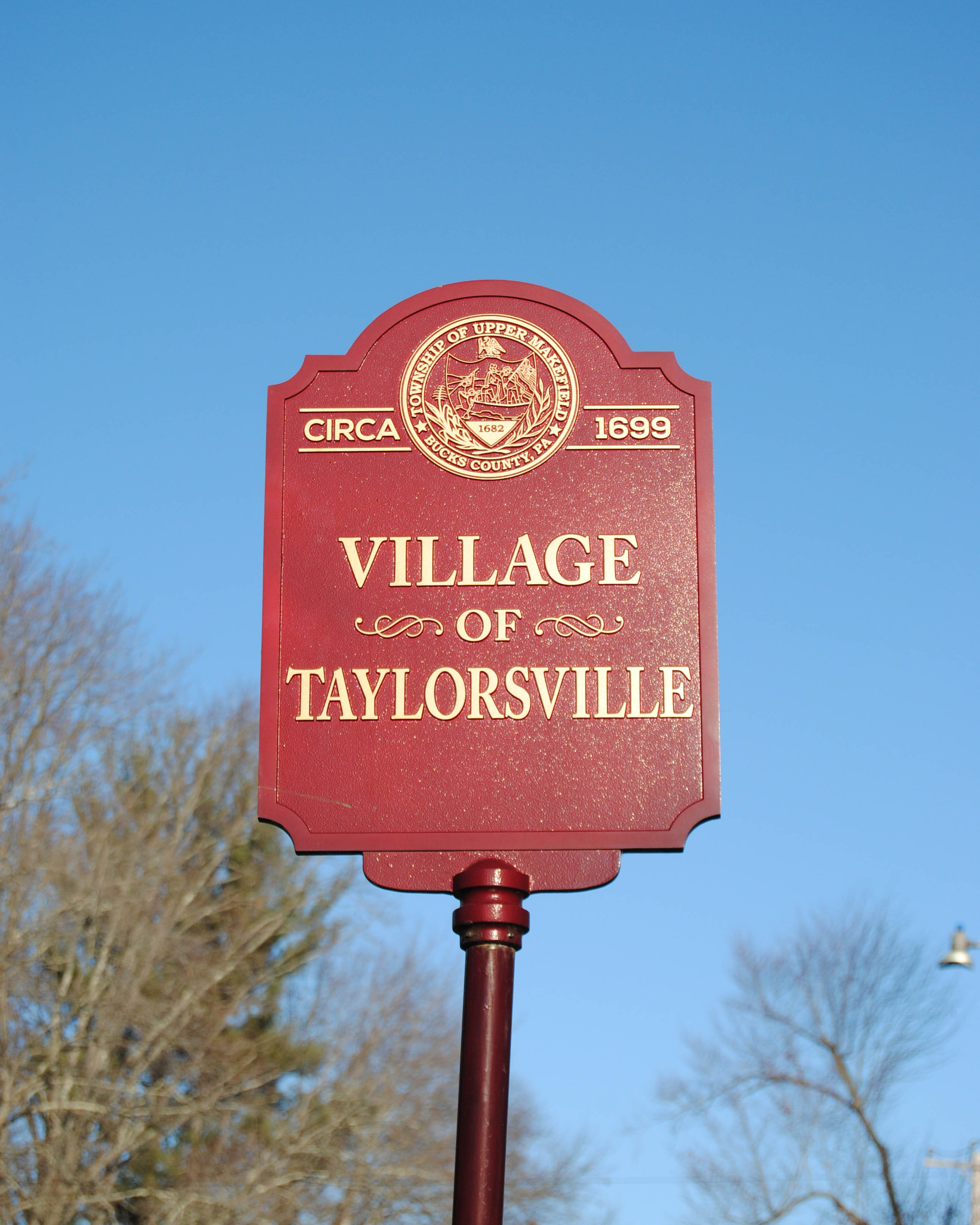
Photo of a sign saying Village of Taylorsville, Circa 1699 - former name of the town called Washington Crossing, Pennsylvania

The headquarters of Washington Crossing Historic Park is also located in Washington Crossing, Pennsylvania. The village is connected by Washington Crossing Bridge with Washington Crossing, New Jersey, which is located on the eastern side of the Delaware River.

== Geography ==
The Delaware Canal, a 60-mile-long (97 km) towpath from Easton to Bristol, runs through Washington Crossing Historic Park.

== Special events ==
The town also participates in special events, such as a reenactment of Washington's nighttime crossing each year. Its ZIP Code is 18977.

== Points of interest ==
- Bowman's Hill Wildflower Preserve
- Washington Crossing Historic Park

== Gallery ==
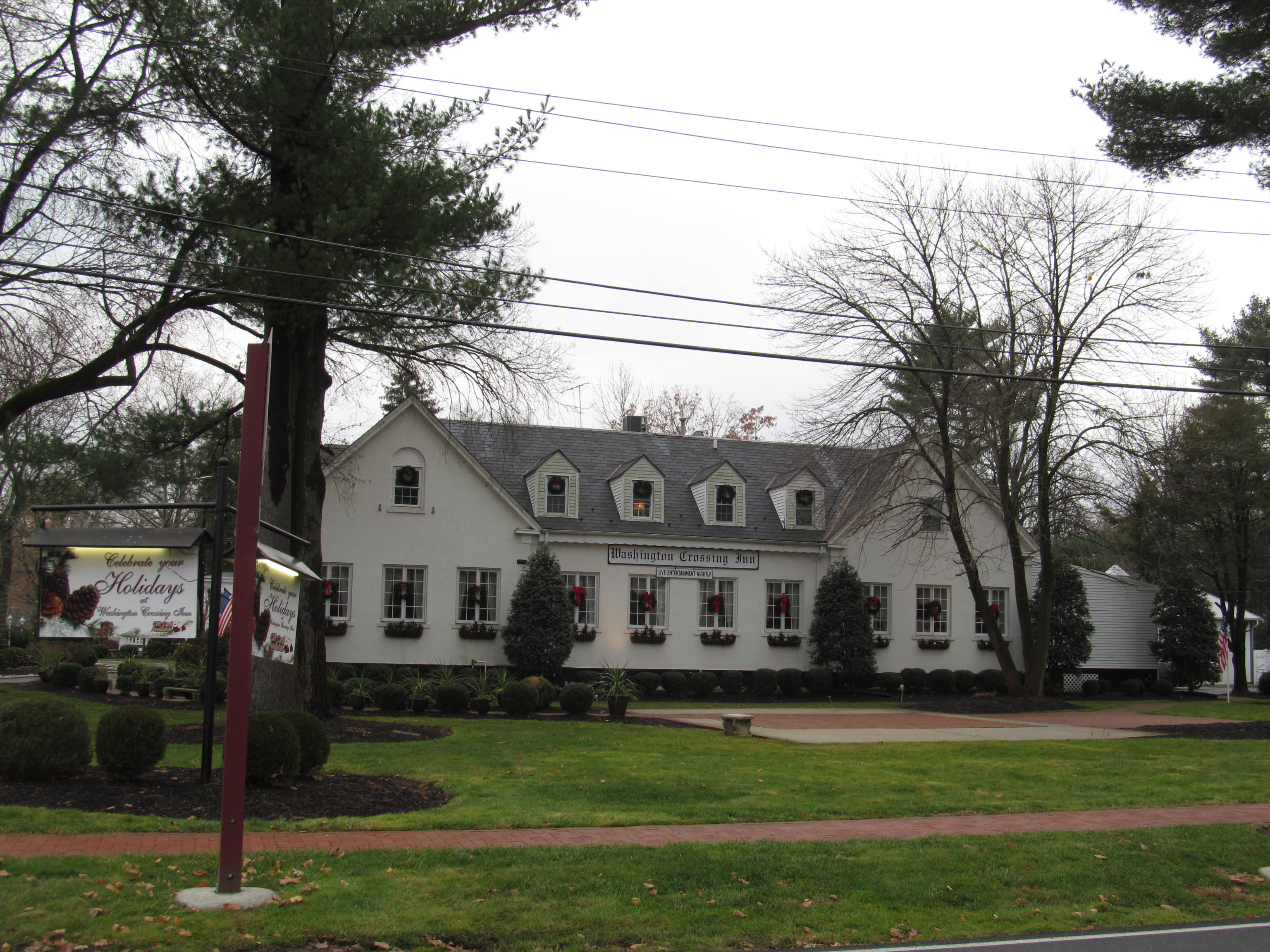
Washington Crossing Inn

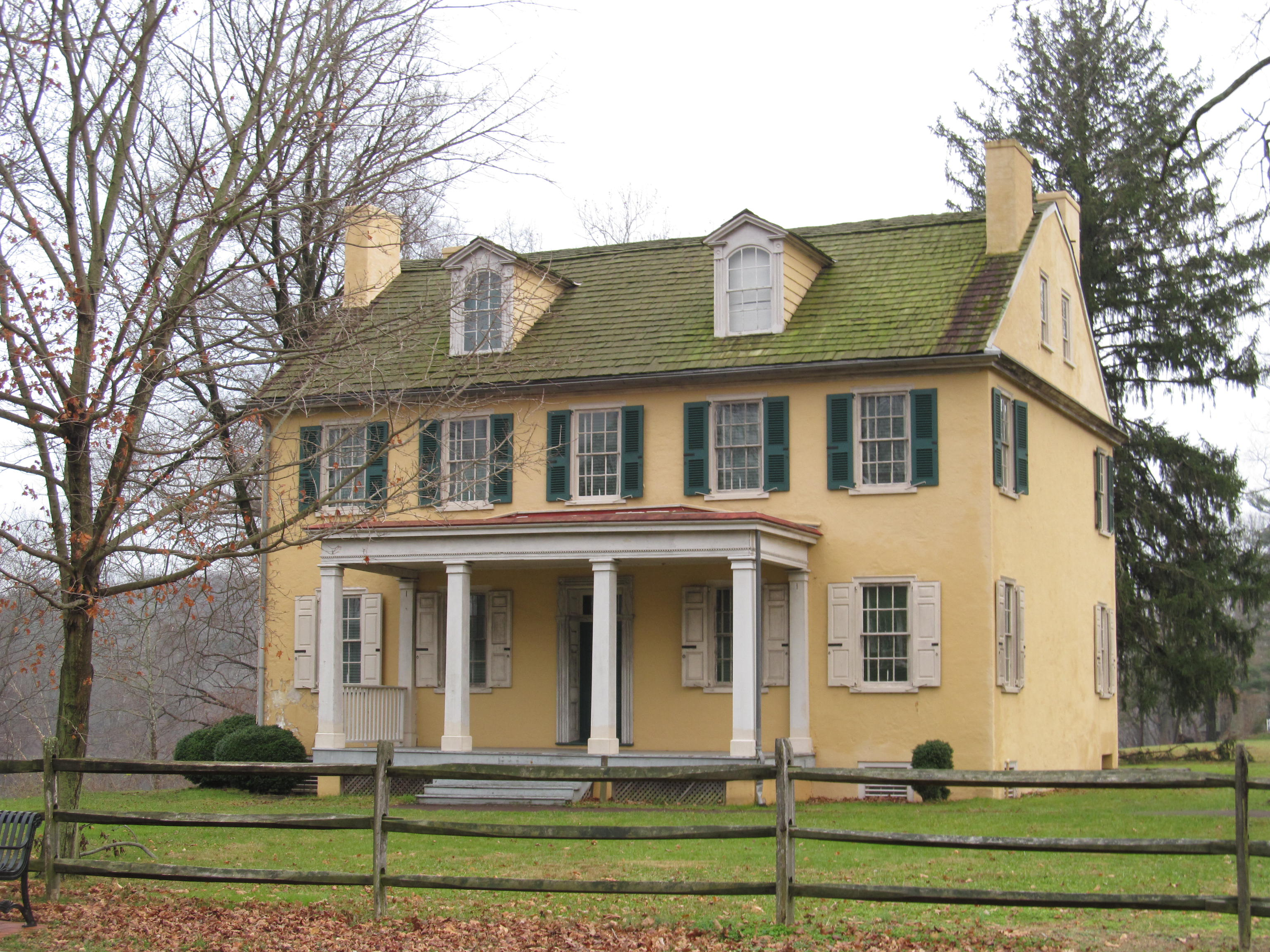
Mahlon K. Taylor house

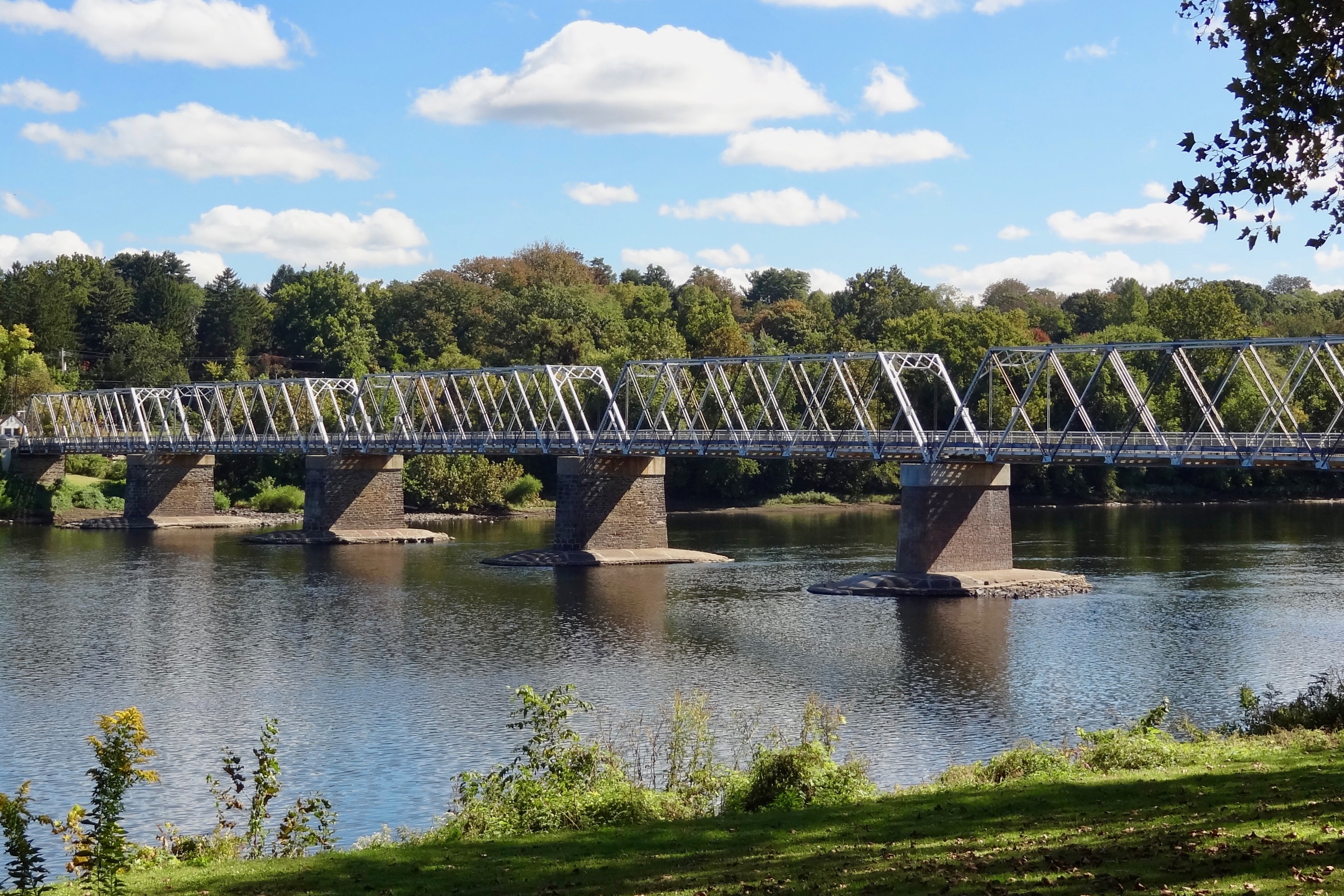
Washington Crossing Bridge
