= List of restaurants in New Jersey =

The following is an incomplete list of current and former restaurants in New Jersey:

Restaurant	Established	Location	Type	Notes
Hell's Kitchen	January 2018	Atlantic City		Location of the chain owned by celebrity chef Gordon Ramsay.
Knife and Fork Inn	1912	Atlantic City		
Olga's Diner	1946	Evesham	Diner	
Ponzio's	1964	Cherry Hill	Family style diner, bar, and bakery	Oldest restaurant in Cherry Hill
Summit Diner	1929	Summit	Diner	
White Manna	1946	Hackensack	Fast food	
White Rose Hamburgers			Diner	
Bahrs	1917		Seafood restaurant, bar and marina	
Brass Rail			Restaurant	Known for supposed paranormal activity
Charlie Brown's Fresh Grill	1966		Casual dining restaurant chain	
Chef Vola's	1921		Italian restaurant	
Chick's Deli	1957		Delicatessen	
Colonial Farms	1793		Tavern, wood fire grill	
Colts Neck Inn	1717		Steakhouse	
Corinne's Place	1989		Soul food restaurant	2022 America's Classics Award
De Lorenzo's Tomato Pies	1936		Pizzeria	
Dock's Oyster House	1897			
Donkey's Place	1943		Sandwiches	
Dorrian's Red Hand Restaurant	1960		Irish-American bar	
Elements	2008		Fine dining restaurant	
Fat Choy	2023		Chinese restaurant	
Ho-Ho-Kus Inn	1790		Historic landmark and restaurant	The name is a Lenape term meaning "the red ceder"
Hoagie Haven	1974			
Italian Peoples Bakery	1936		Bakery and delicatessen	
Light Horse Tavern	2002			Restored from an 1850s tavern
Max's Bar & Grill	1928		Hot dogs	
Maxwell's	1978		Bar/restaurant and music club	
Mustache Bill's Diner	1959		Diner	
Papa's Tomato Pies	1912		Pizzeria	
Peacock Inn	1911		Historic restaurant and inn	
Pithari Taverna	2006		Greek restaurant	
Pizza Land	1965		Pizzeria	
Razza			Pizzeria	
Ravagh Persian Grill	1998		Iranian cuisine	
Rutt's Hut	1928		Hot dogs	
The Ryland Inn				
Stewart's Restaurants				
Surf Taco	2001		Mexican-Californian cuisine-style restaurants	
Sweetwater Casino	1927			
The Frog and the Peach	1983		Restaurant	Named after a stage routine by Peter Cook and Dudley Moore
White House Sub Shop	1946			
The Windmill	1963		Hot dogs and other fast food	First location was in a windmill-shaped building
Basil T's Brewery	1987		Brewpub	
Buddakan	1998		Pan-Asian fusion cuisine	
Hawaiian Cottage	1938		Polynesian style restaurant	
Mrs. Jay's	1922		Bar and restaurant	
Union Hotel	1814			Historic landmark
Wash's Restaurant	1937		Soul food restaurant	

== See also ==
- Cuisine of New Jersey
