= South Trenton, New Jersey =

Populated place in Mercer County, New Jersey, US

South Trenton
- Neighborhood of Trenton
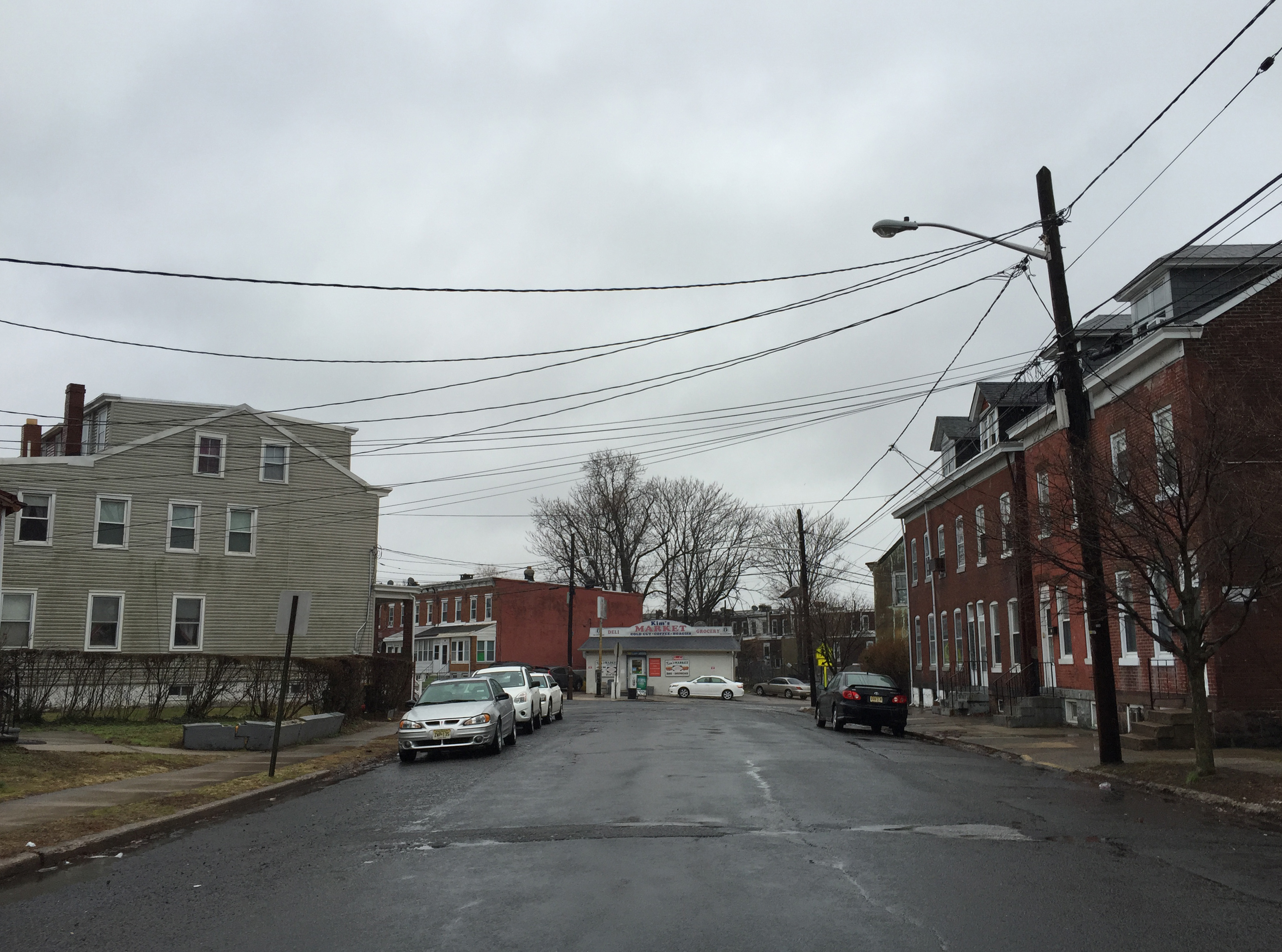
- Second Street in South Trenton

- Location of South Trenton in Mercer County Inset: Location of county within the state of New Jersey South Trenton (New Jersey) South Trenton (the United States)
- Coordinates: 40°11′59″N 74°45′20″W
- Country: United States
- State: New Jersey
- County: Mercer
- City: Trenton

South Trenton is a neighborhood located within the city of Trenton in Mercer County, in the U.S. state of New Jersey. It is home to Italian Americans, Latin Americans, Irish Americans and their descendants. South Trenton borders Hamilton Township to the southeast and the Delaware River to the west. It had a brief existence as an independent municipality from 1840 to 1851.

South Trenton was incorporated as a borough by an act of the New Jersey Legislature on February 28, 1840, from portions of Nottingham Township. The borough was annexed by Trenton on April 14, 1851.

South Trenton is home to Trenton's Chambersburg neighborhood also known as The 'Burg'. Its population includes a large immigrant community from Poland, Slovakia, Ireland, Hungary, Ukraine, and Germany, though eventually mostly Italian immigrants and their offspring came to dominate the neighborhood, and it has since been known for its Italian-American population. It is also known for being the Restaurant District of Trenton with many of the restaurants in the neighborhood specializing in Italian cuisine. Chambersburg also hosts the annual Italian celebration called the Feast of Madonna or the Feast of Lights, further reflecting its cultural and religious roots. In recent years, South Trenton has been experiencing a sharp rise in residents from Latin America, especially Puerto Rico. There are still large concentrations of Puerto Ricans in South Trenton. More recently, Guatemalan, Costa Rican, and Ecuadorian immigrants have come to the neighborhood. Many have set up new stores and businesses alongside Italian-Americans. Today, South Broad St. in South Trenton is home to Trenton's largest population of Latinos.

== Landmarks ==
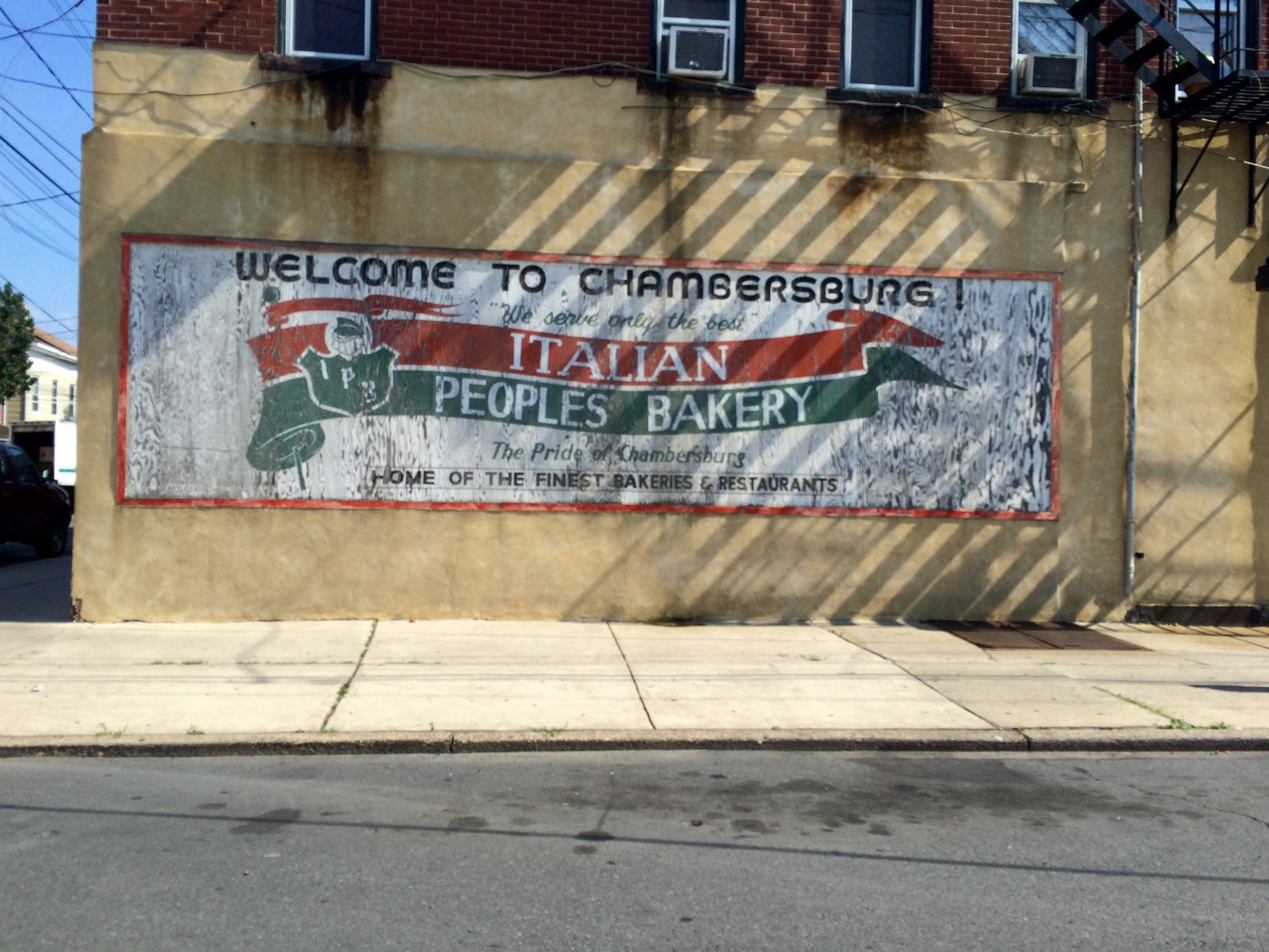
A sign for the Italian Peoples Bakery on Butler Street, a neighborhood landmark

Arm & Hammer Park

Landmarks in South Trenton include the First Baptist Church of Trenton located at the corner of Centre and Bridge Street which was founded in 1805. The Sun National Bank Center was completed in 1999 and hosts hundreds of events per year from hockey games to musical concerts to job fairs as well as the very popular PrimeTime Shootout showcasing some of the nation's best talent in high school basketball. The 2003 PrimeTime Shootout was the site of the highest-scoring game of LeBron James' high school career. It is located at the corner of South Broad St. and Hamilton Ave. The Trenton Thunder's stadium, Arm & Hammer Park, is located at the end of Cass Street (nicknamed "Thunder Road"). It is the Class AA-affiliate of the New York Yankees (formerly the Detroit Tigers and the Boston Red Sox) and counts Tony Clark, Carl Pavano, Trot Nixon, Nomar Garciaparra, David Eckstein, Dioner Navarro, Chen Ming-Wing, Phil Hughes, Robinson Cano, Melky Cabrera, Joba Chamberlain, Ian Kennedy, Bret Saberhagen, Derek Jeter, Bernie Williams, and Roger Clemens (the latter four as injury rehabs). There were two other Trenton minor league teams: the Trenton Senators and the Trenton Giants. The Trenton Giants once had Willie Mays (see Say Hey: The Autobiography of Willie Mays, by Willie Mays with Lou Sahadi, copyright 1988, starting at p. 46) among its former players. The New Jersey State Prison (NJSP) is also located in South Trenton mainly along 2nd St. and has a mural dedicated to the Trenton Thunder along its side that faces Thunder Road.

Another very famous landmark of South Trenton and Chambersburg is the famed and renowned Italian Peoples Bakery. Known as the "Pride of Chambersburg", it has served the neighborhood bread and Italian baked goods for over 80 years. It is still owned and operated by descendants of the same family that started the business in 1936. They now have several locations in New Jersey and Pennsylvania, but their main location is in the Heart of Chambersburg at 61-63 Butler Street, near the Italian Banquet Hall Roman Hall, and near St Joachims Catholic Church and many other Chambersburg businesses.

== History ==
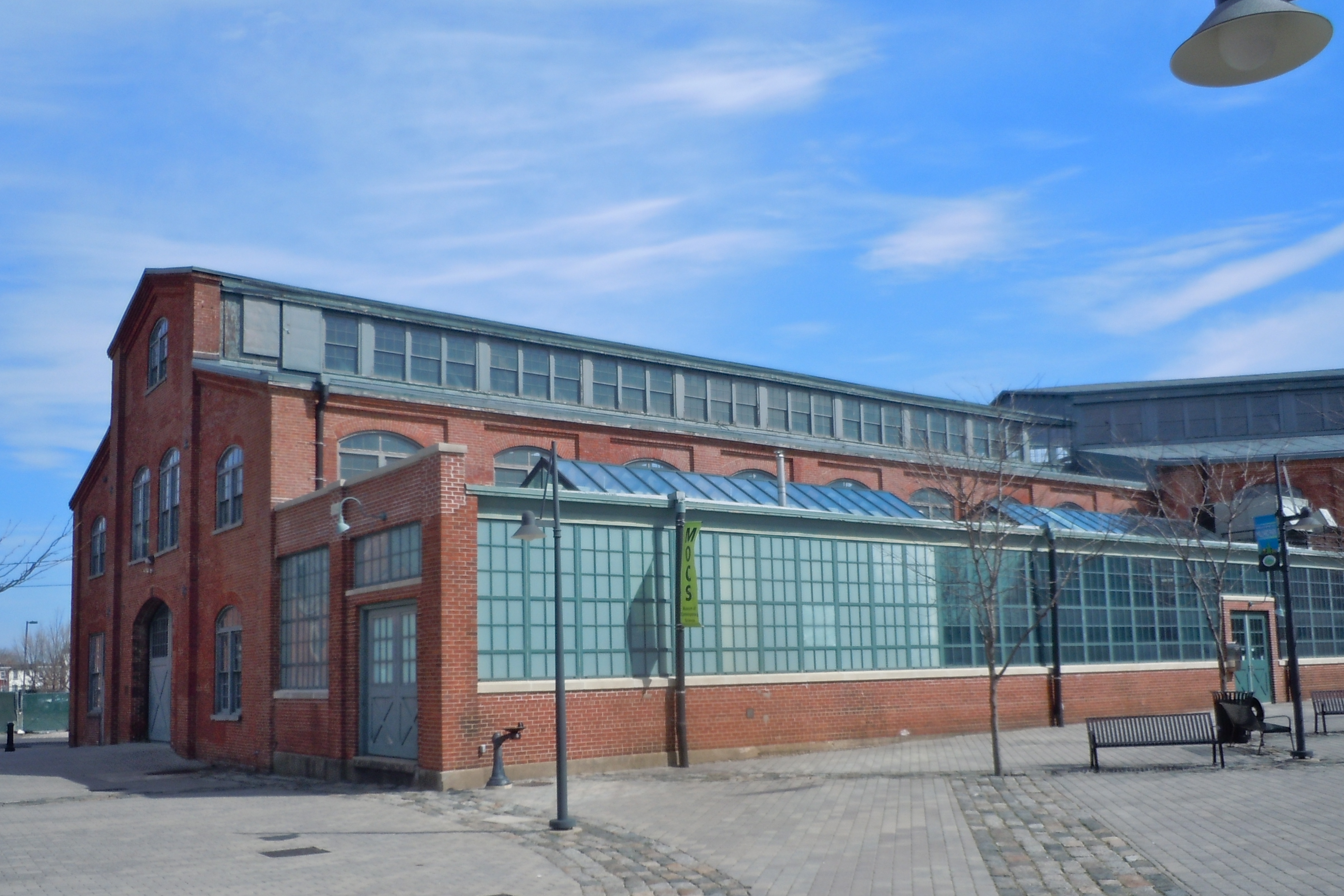
Roebling Machine Shop, oldest building in the Roebling complex, now a museum space

In April 1828, all South Trenton from the Assunpink southward was included in Nottingham Township. Trenton was considered the section north of the creek. Nottingham was divided, however, on April 11, 1842, the territory set off being thenceforth known as Hamilton Township.

In 1831, John A. Roebling migrated from Germany, moving to Trenton in about 1848, when he purchased some acres of land on South Broad Street where his new wire plant would be located.

In 1851, South Trenton was annexed as part of Trenton. This also included the areas of Mill Hill and Bloomsbury. 5 years later, the part of Hamilton known as Lamberton was annexed as well. Mill Hill was the sight of some of the earliest known industrial development in Trenton. Residents were mostly working and middle class: industrial workers, clerks, shopkeepers, teachers and government workers. Mill Hill grew rapidly in the second half of the nineteenth century, with some decline toward the end of the century. An analysis of households based on city directories of this period charts the composition of the neighborhood.

Many people consider Chambersburg part of South Trenton and call the area of the Streets of Lamberton, Cass, and Centre as "The Bottom" because of its urban area and the rise in crime along these streets.
