= Chambersburg, Trenton, New Jersey =

Populated place in Mercer County, New Jersey, US

Chambersburg
- Neighborhood of Trenton
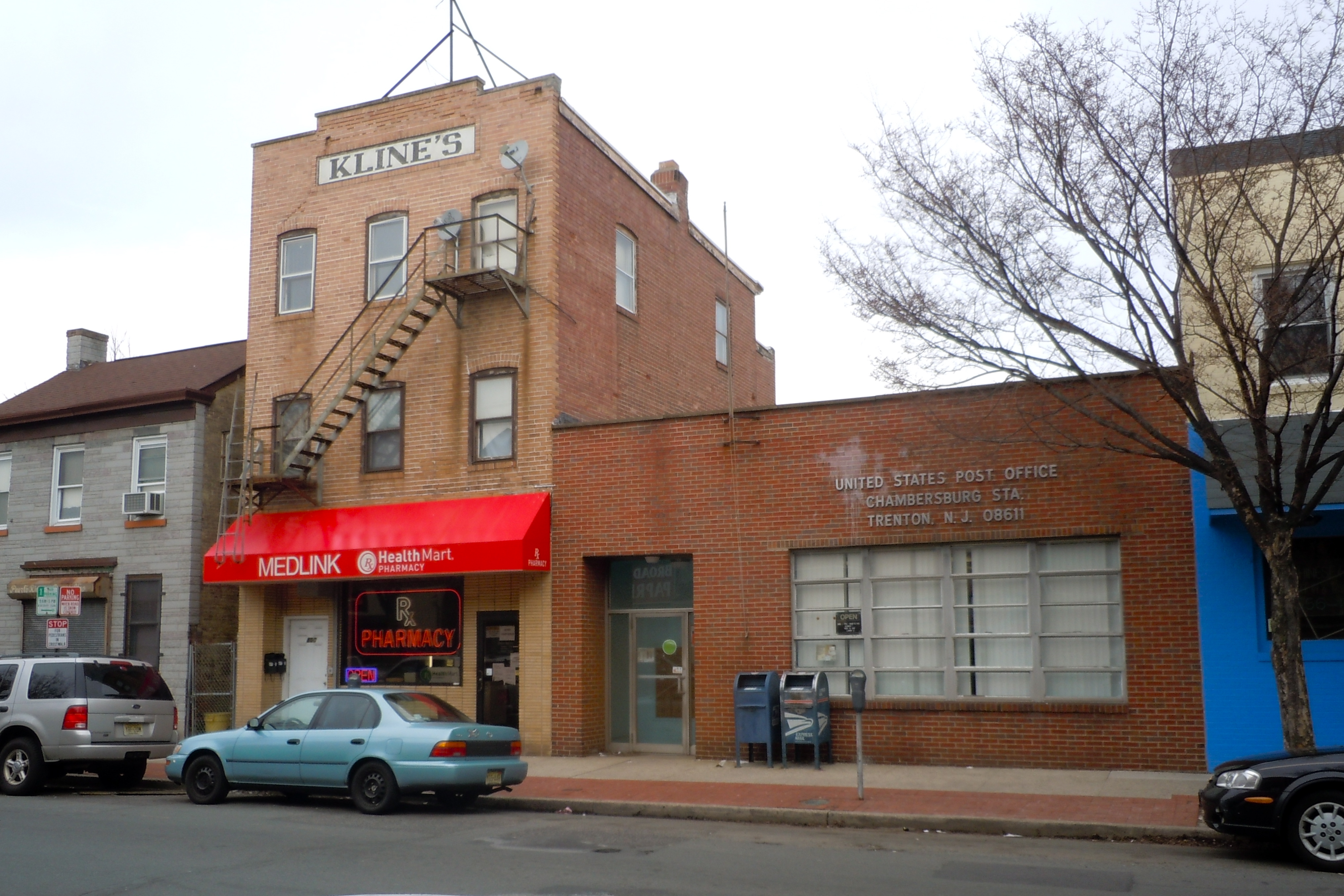
- Chambersburg Station post office on Broad Street

- Location of Chambersburg in Mercer County Inset: Location of county within the state of New Jersey Chambersburg (New Jersey) Chambersburg (the United States)
- Coordinates: 40°12′39″N 74°44′49″W
- Country: United States
- State: New Jersey
- County: Mercer
- City: Trenton
- Named for: Robert Chambers

Chambersburg is a neighborhood located within the city of Trenton in Mercer County, in the U.S. state of New Jersey. It is considered part of South Trenton. Chambersburg was an independent municipality from 1872 to 1888.

Chambersburg was named for Robert Chambers, a founder of the area, whose family is memorialized by the local Chambers Street. Chambers died in 1865, shortly before the borough was created.

Chambersburg was incorporated as a borough by an act of the New Jersey Legislature on April 2, 1872, from portions of Hamilton Township. On March 27, 1874, the municipality was reincorporated as the Borough of Chambersburg Township. On May 1, 1888, Chambersburg was annexed to Trenton.

Chambersburg is the birthplace of fictional bounty hunter Stephanie Plum, a character created by author Janet Evanovich. A significant portion of each of the novels featuring Plum takes place in or around "The 'Burg."

== Industrial heritage ==
John A. Roebling, the builder of the Brooklyn Bridge, founded his wire making company in the neighborhood along the Delaware and Raritan Canal, now covered by Route 129, in 1849. Under the leadership of his sons the company grew to be Trenton's largest employer, with a massive industrial complex on the western side of Chambersburg. Operations ceased at the plant in 1974, with parts having undergone adaptive reuse and others awaiting redevelopment. Two different parts of the complex have been listed on the National Register of Historic Places, the Roebling Machine Shop, and John A. Roebling's Sons Company, Trenton N.J., Block 3.

== Community ==
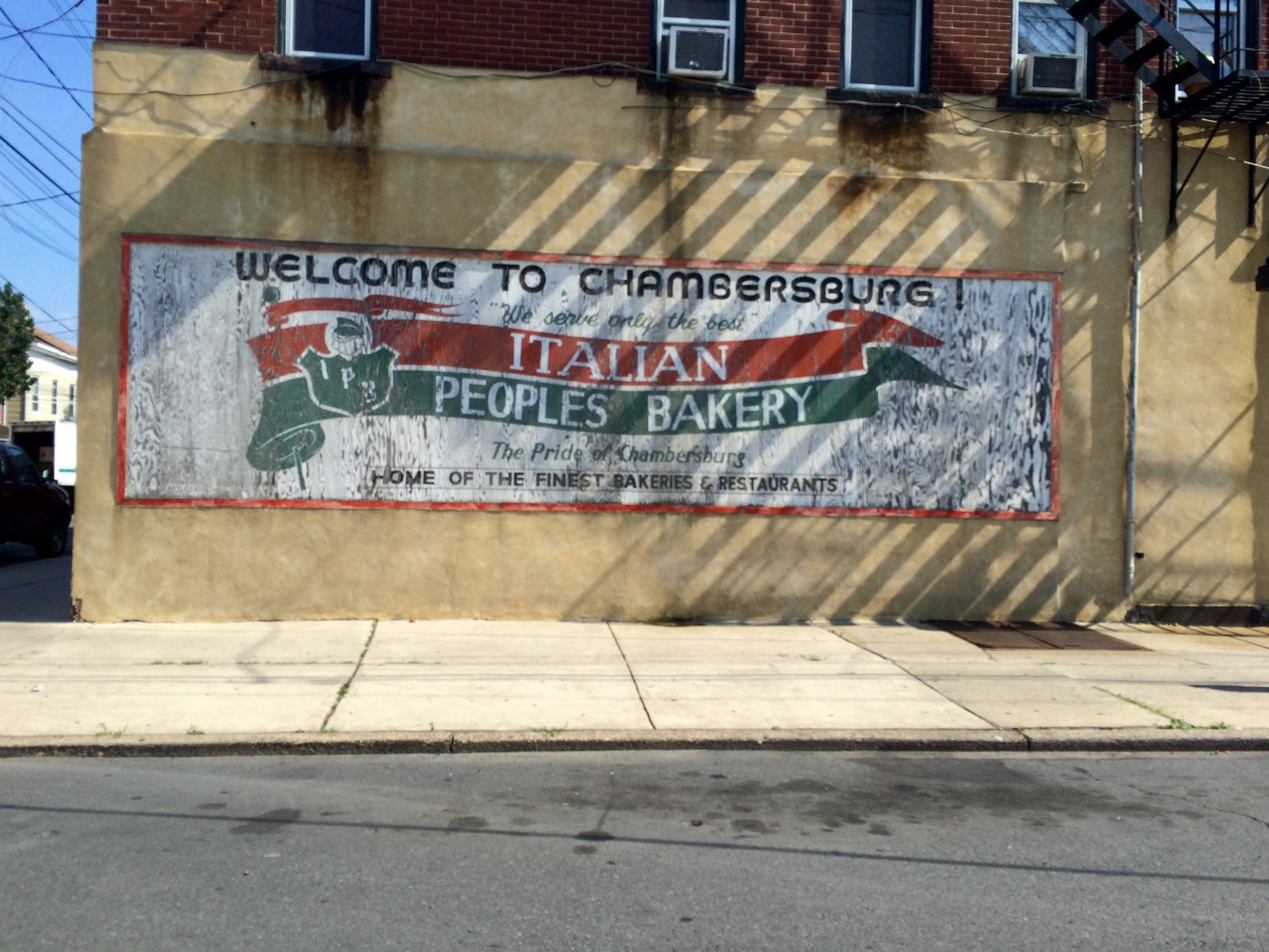
A sign for the Italian Peoples Bakery on Butler Street, a neighborhood landmark

During most of the 20th century, Chambersburg was widely regarded as the "Little Italy" of the city of Trenton. The neighborhood featured numerous family-owned Italian restaurants, bakeries, butchers and grocery stores. An annual Feast of Lights was held centrally in Chambersburg. Over the years, however, the wave of Italian immigrants that shaped the community died out, their descendants left the area and most of the businesses that catered to their needs closed.

Since the decline of the Italian community, many newer immigrants have come to the neighborhood. Today Chambersburg has Trenton's largest Latino community. Many of the immigrants come from Guatemala, Costa Rica, and Ecuador. The Puerto Rican population has decreased slightly but is still present in Chambersburg.

Current points of interest include the buildings of the John A. Roebling's Sons Company, Trenton N.J., Block 3, Unity Park and Immaculate Conception Church.

Remnants of the Italian Community can still be found at Panorama Musicale and Italian Peoples Bakery and Our Lady of the Angels Parish, which is what the Italian National parish of St. Joachim's was renamed in 2005. This Little Italy section of Trenton has also gained numerous Italian restaurants in recent years.

== Notable residents ==
Notable residents of Chambersburg include:

- Samuel Alito (born 1950), Associate Justice of the Supreme Court of the United States

== Gallery ==
National Register of Historic Places Sites

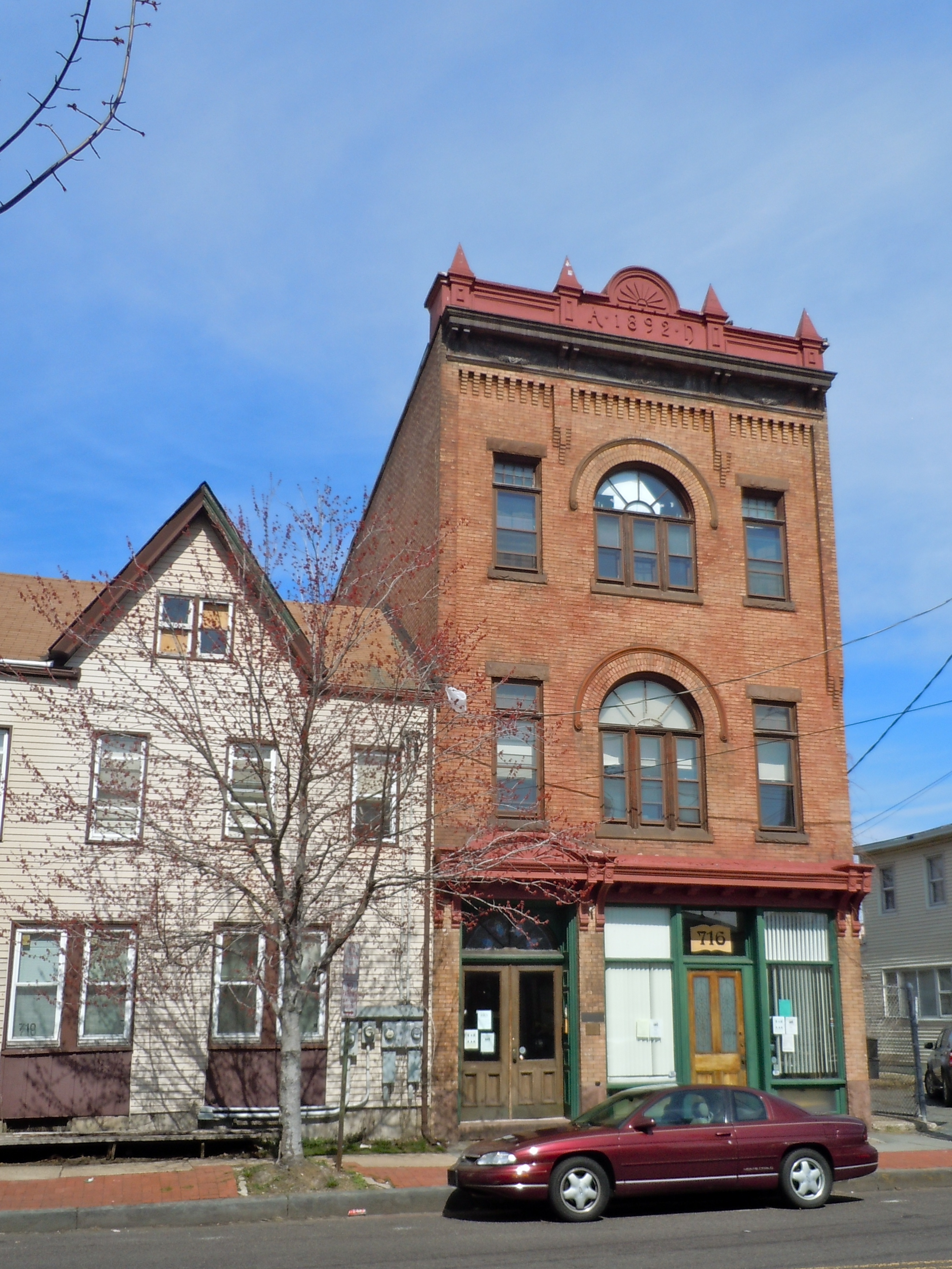
In and Out Social Club, founded 1889 for "social, intellectual, and recreative purposes."

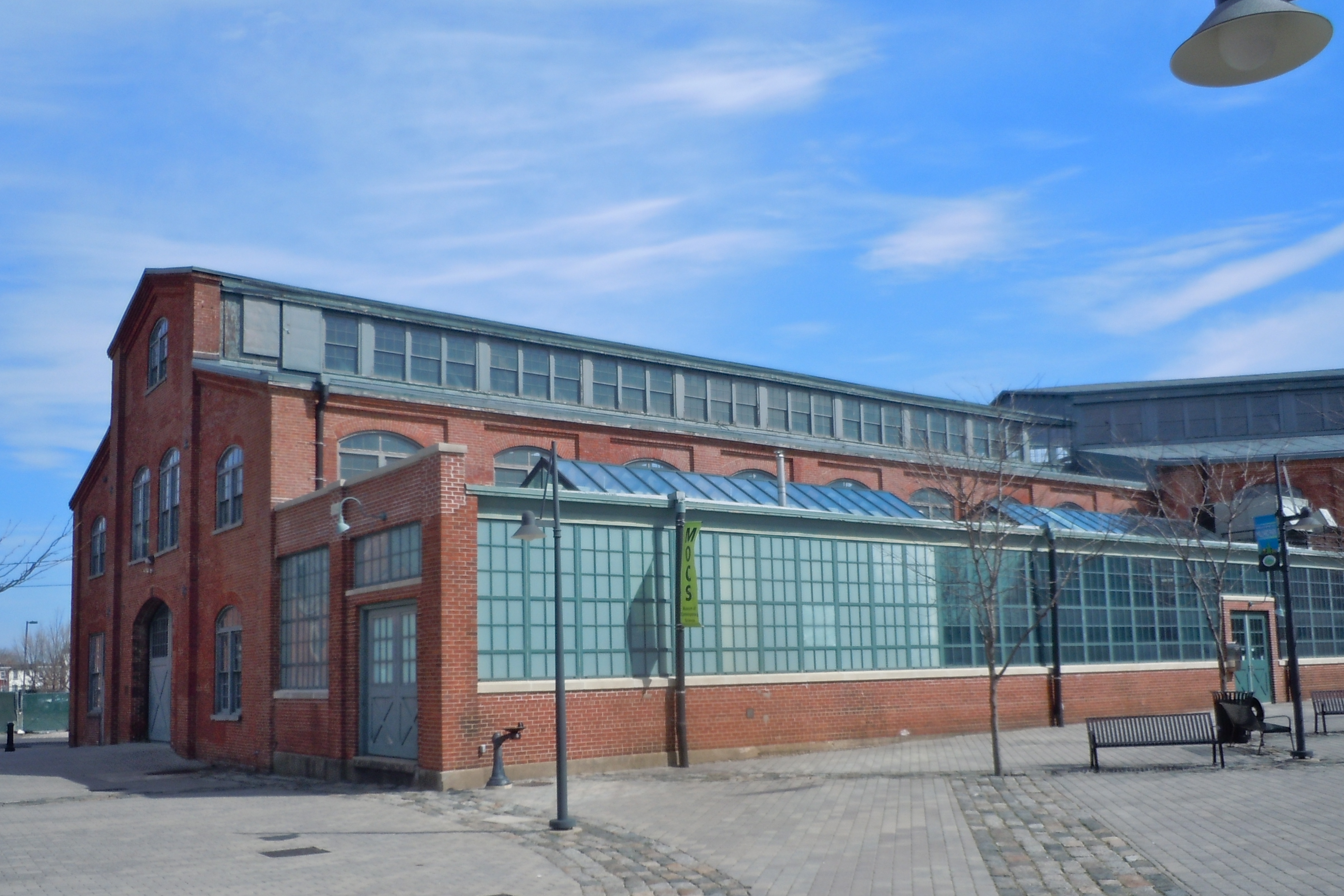
The Roebling Machine Shop, oldest building in the Roebling complex, now a museum space

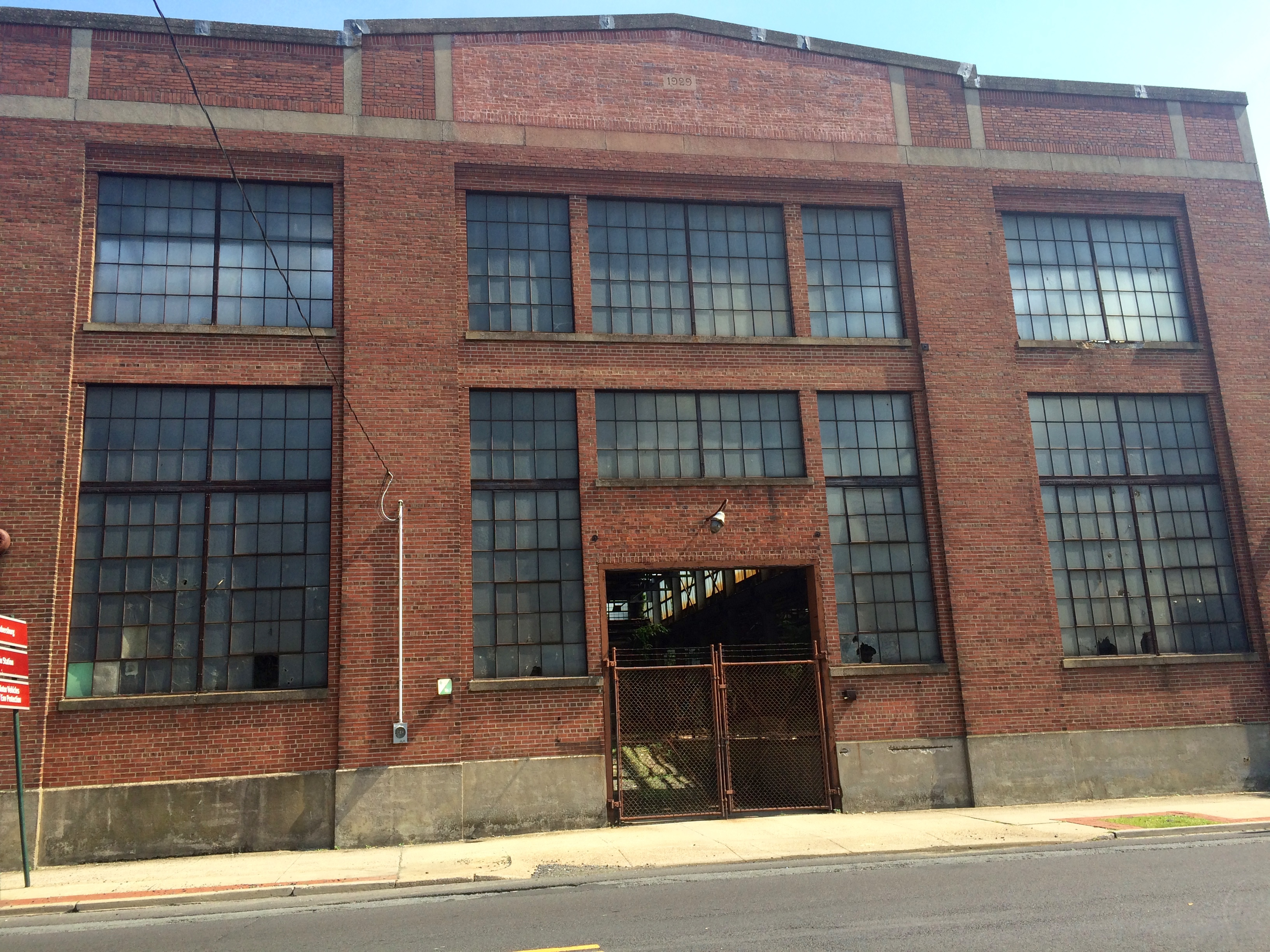
John A. Roebling's Sons Company, Trenton N.J., Block 3, once produced wire for bridges nationwide including the Golden Gate Bridge. Slated for conversion to lofts and commercial space

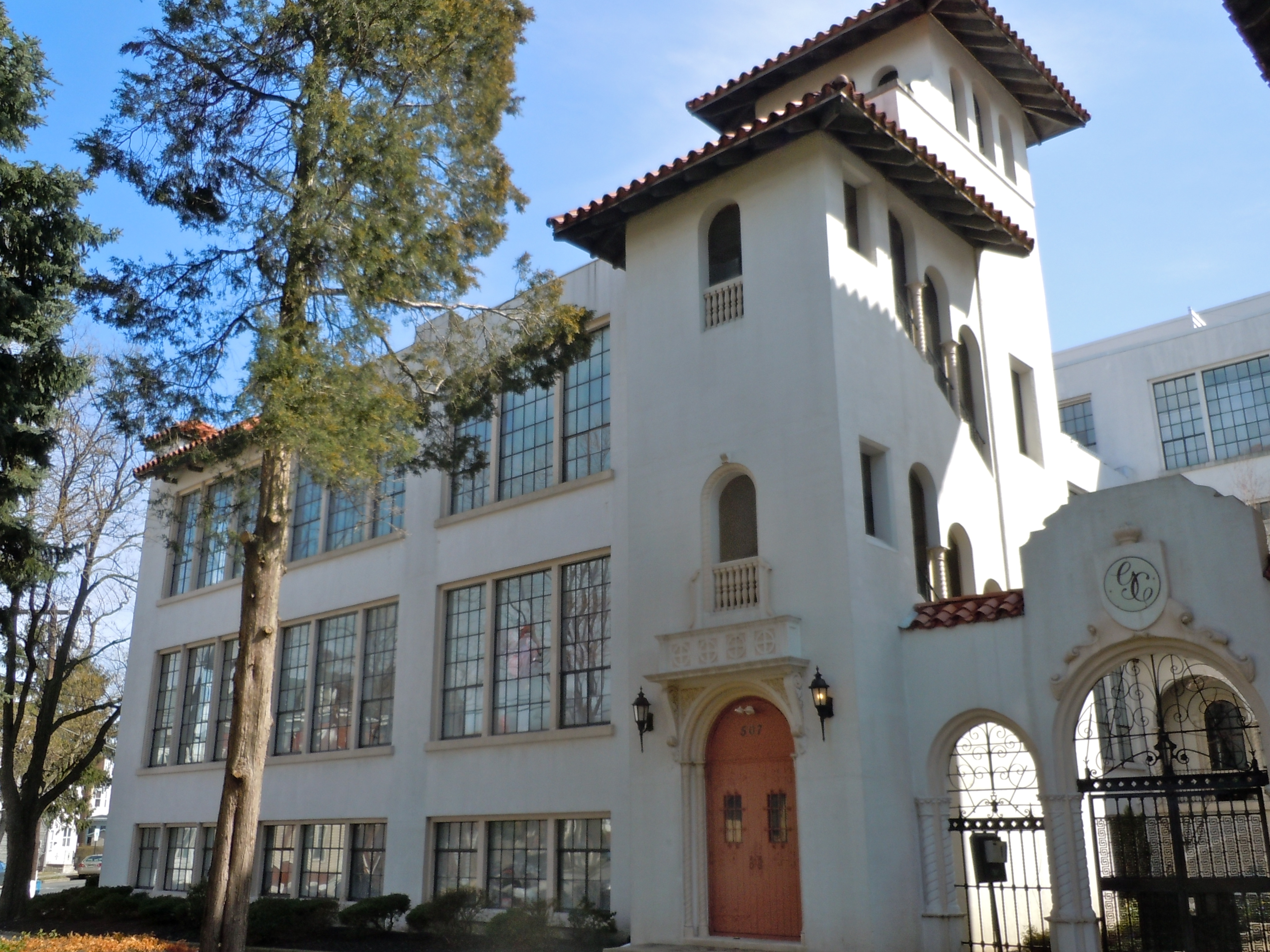
The Henry Clay and Bock & Co. Ltd. Cigar Factory, now apartments

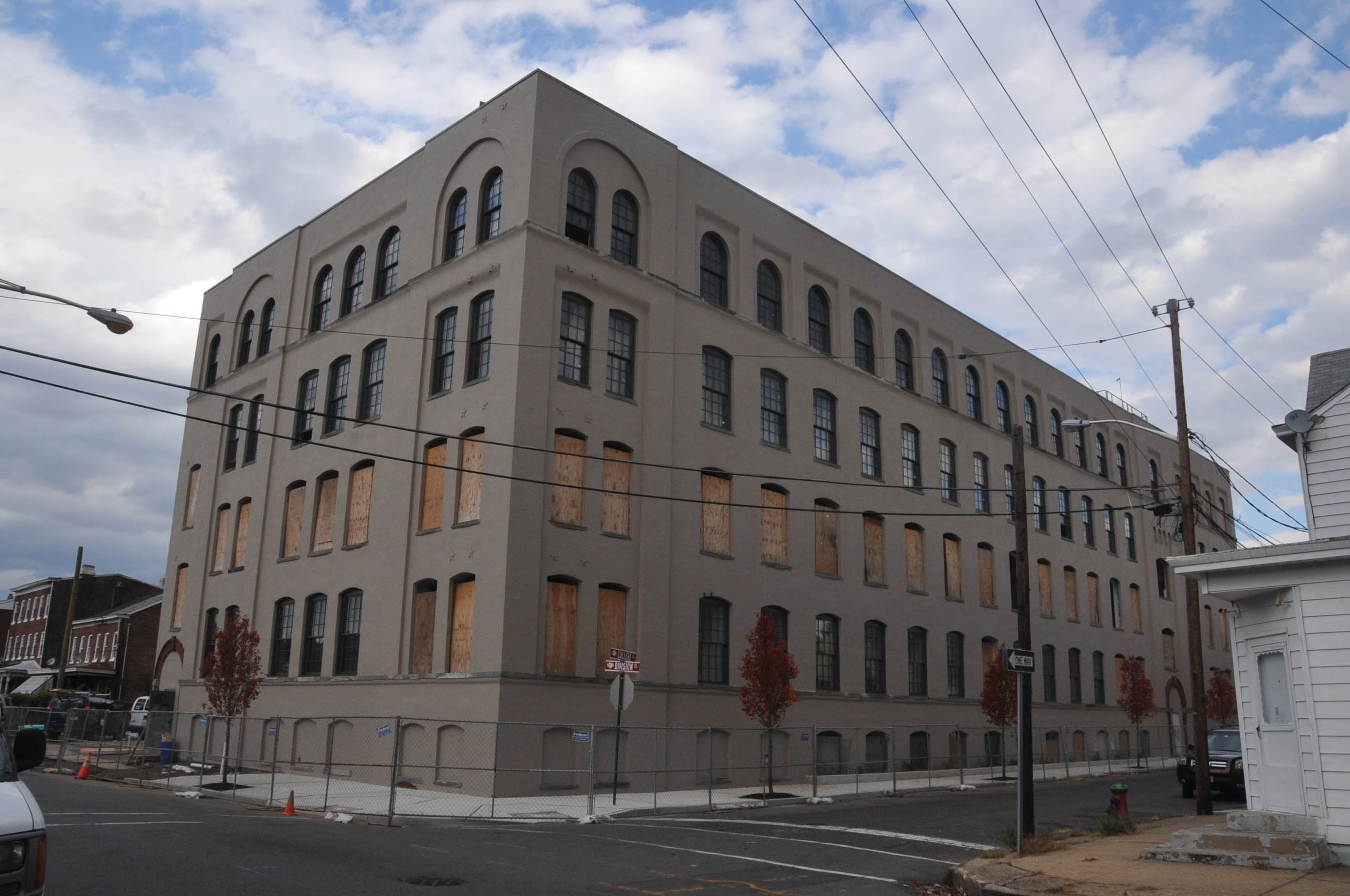
The American Cigar Company building, converted to lofts
