= The Brass Rail =

The Brass Rail may refer to:

- The Brass Rail (Hoboken, New Jersey), a restaurant
- The Brass Rail (Toronto), a strip club
