= John A. Roebling's Sons Company, Trenton N.J., Block 3 =

- U.S. National Register of Historic Places
- New Jersey Register of Historic Places
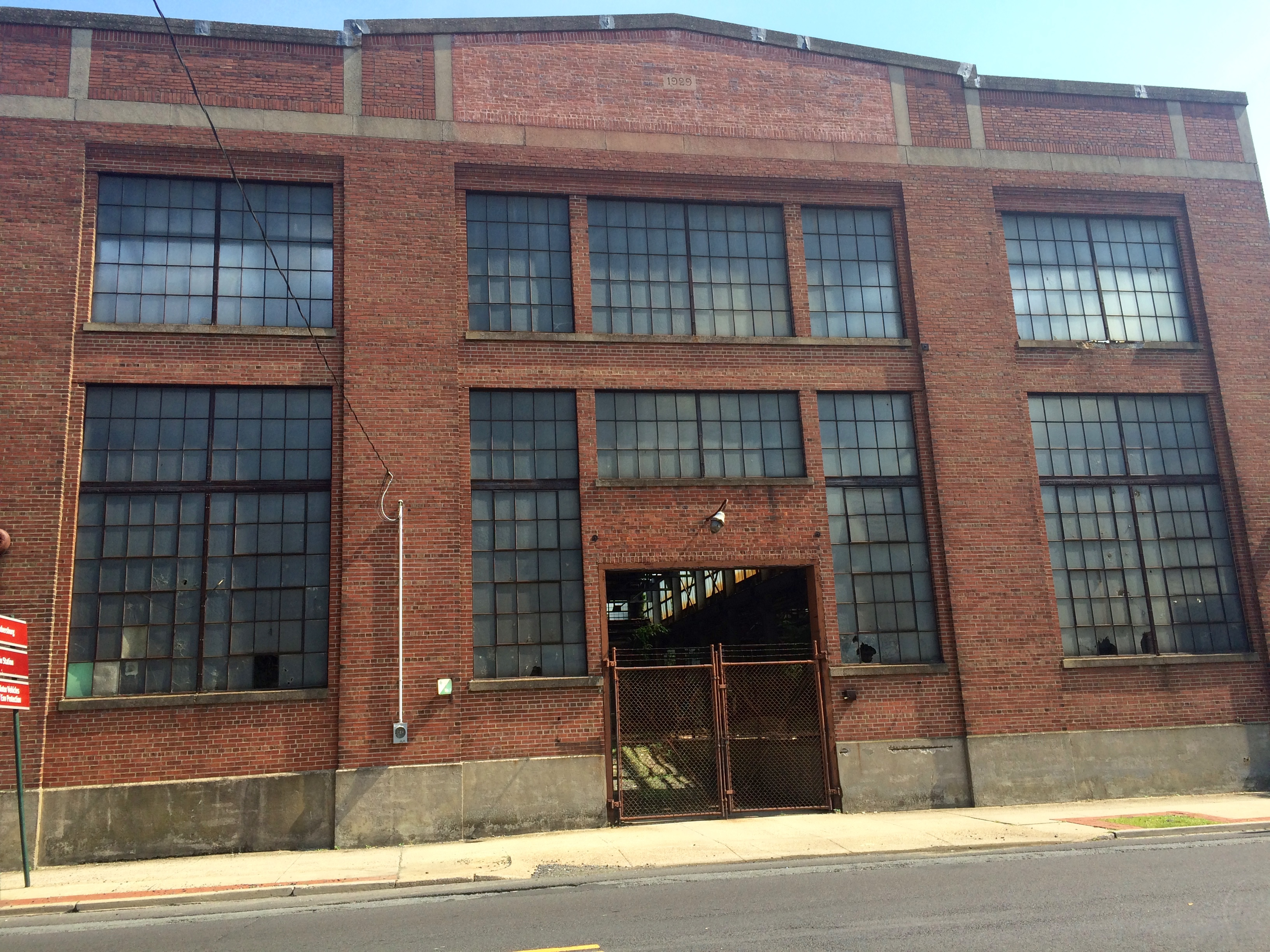
- Building 114, the Elmer Street Rope Shop North Extension (1929)

- Location within Mercer County, New Jersey Location within New Jersey Location within the United States
- Location: Bounded by Hamilton Ave., Clark, Elmer, & E. Canal Sts., Trenton, New Jersey
- Coordinates: 40°12′45.6″N 74°45′18.7″W
- Area: 7.33 acres (2.97 ha)
- Built: 1908-1929
- Architectural style: Industrial
- NRHP reference No.: 12000528
- NJRHP No.: 5204

Significant dates
- Added to NRHP: August 22, 2012
- Designated NJRHP: June 25, 2012

John A. Roebling's Sons Company, Trenton N.J., Block 3 is the northern portion of the former Roebling manufacturing complex in Trenton, New Jersey. The buildings date from 1908–1929 and the site was added to the National Register of Historic Places on August 22, 2012.

== History ==
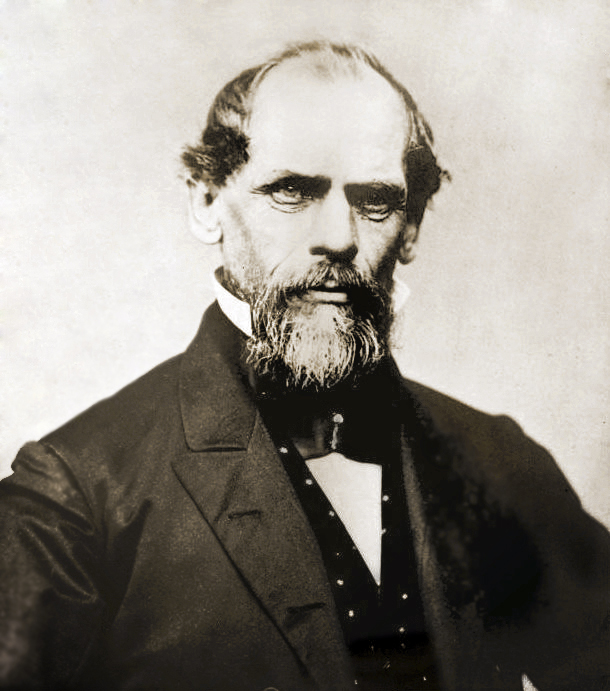
John A. Roebling in 1866 or 1867

John A. Roebling, the designer of the Brooklyn Bridge, founded his steel wire manufacturing company on the site in 1849. The location, on the western side of the Chambersburg, now a neighborhood of Trenton, was chosen for its location alongside the Delaware and Raritan Canal, since buried underneath Route 129. The location also had easy access to the rail and port connections of the growing city. Under Roebling's sons the business grew, with the Trenton complex ultimately becoming Trenton's largest and most famous employer. The steel wire manufactured in block 3 was used for many famous bridges and projects, from the North Sea Mine Barrage in World War I to the Golden Gate Bridge during the Great Depression. The Roebling works made the greatest contribution to Trenton's reputation as an industrial center, memorialized in the motto "Trenton Makes, the World Takes" on the Lower Trenton Bridge. The business was sold by the Roeblings in 1953 and operations in Trenton stopped in 1974. Building 101 was used for some time to store paper goods.

Block 3 suffered a number of fires in the 1910s, some attributed to arson due to worker unrest. The current buildings on the site date to expansions in 1908, 1916–17, and 1929. There were seven buildings in the block, five of which are extant:

Building Number	Name	Year built	Picture
101	Clark Street Rope Shop	1917	
102	Elmer Street Rope Shop (demolished)	1917	
103	Reel Spray (demolished)	1908	
104	Boiler House	1916	
105	Engine House	1917	
110	Carpenter Shop	1908	
114	Elmer Street Rope Shop North Extension	1929	

== Redevelopment ==
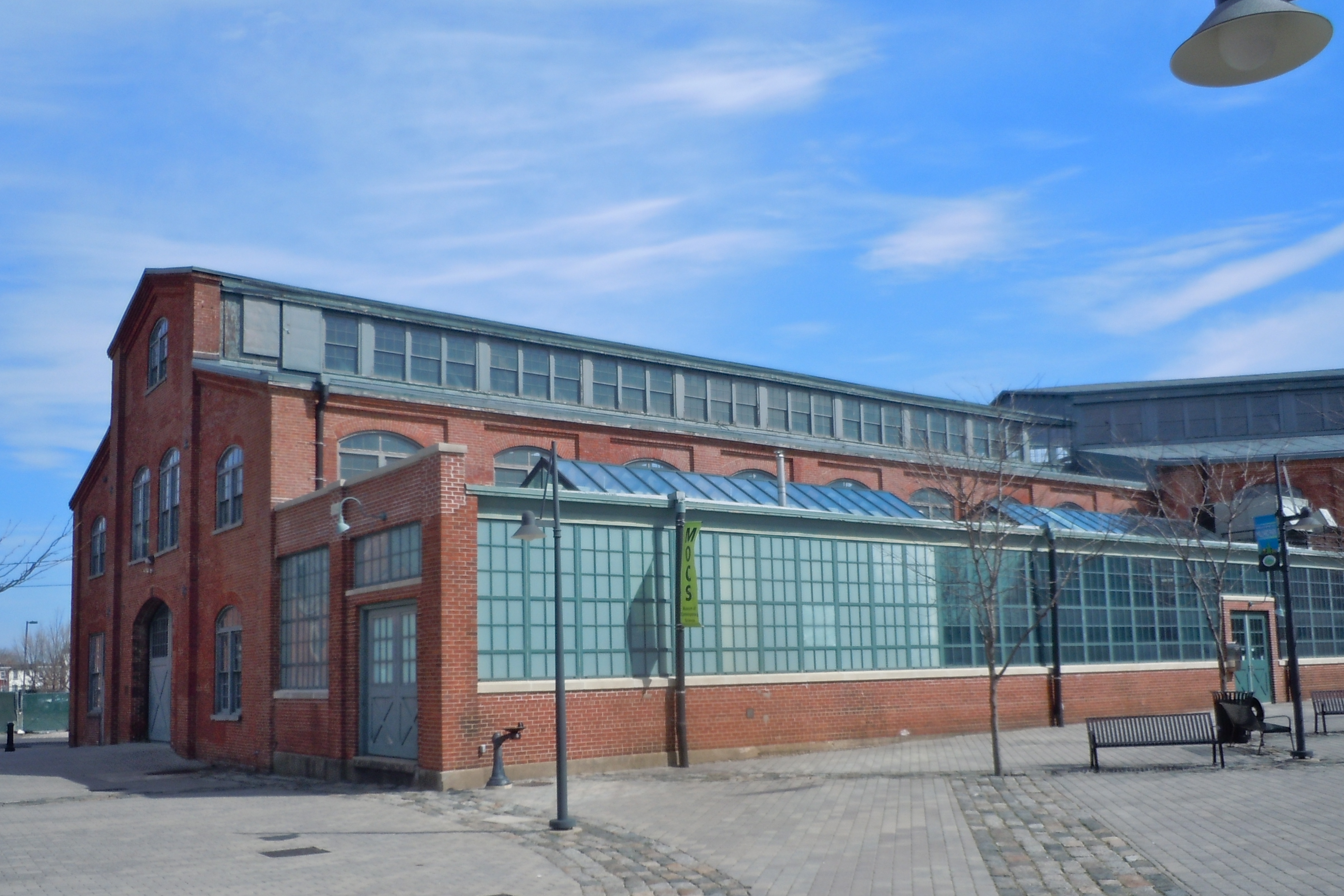
The Roebling Machine Shop, just south of block 3 in a rehabilitated portion of the complex

The portion of the Roebling complex immediately to the south of block 3 has been rehabilitated as offices, a market, and a museum in the NRHP listed Roebling Machine Shop. Block 3 is adjacent to the Hamilton Avenue station of the River Line light rail line. It is also quite close to the Trenton Transit Center on the Northeast Corridor, the terminus of the River Line, providing easy rail access to New York City and Philadelphia. The CURE Insurance Arena, a 10,500-seat arena home to concerts and sporting events, is across the street. The Trenton Ferry Historic District lies to the west. Nearby landmarks include the Italian Peoples Bakery and the New Jersey State Prison.

The buildings in block 3 have experienced significant decay. The block has been the subject of many redevelopment efforts and has been redeveloped as lofts, offices, commercial space, and a piazza for events. Building 101 was converted to a loft-style apartment building. Redevelopment of the rest of the complex, including the construction of new buildings and a parking garage, will follow.

== See also ==
- Roebling Machine Shop
- National Register of Historic Places listings in Mercer County, New Jersey
- John A. Roebling
