= Razza =

Restaurant in Jersey City, New Jersey, U.S.

- Interactive map of Razza

Restaurant information
- Food type: Pizza
- Location: 275-277 Grove Street, Jersey City, New Jersey, 07302, United States
- Coordinates: 40°43′04″N 74°02′39″W
- Website: razzanj.com

For people with the surname, see Razza (surname).

Razza is a restaurant in Jersey City, New Jersey. It was included in The New York Times's 2024 list of the 22 best pizzerias in the United States.
