= Henry Clay (cigar) =

- Product type: Cigar
- Current owner: Imperial Brands
- Produced by: Altadis USA
- Country: United States
- Introduced: 1840s
- Markets: United States

Henry Clay is an American brand of cigars named after the early American politician Henry Clay. The cigars are currently manufactured in the Dominican Republic. The brand is currently owned by the Spanish company Altadis, a subsidiary of Imperial Brands.

== History ==
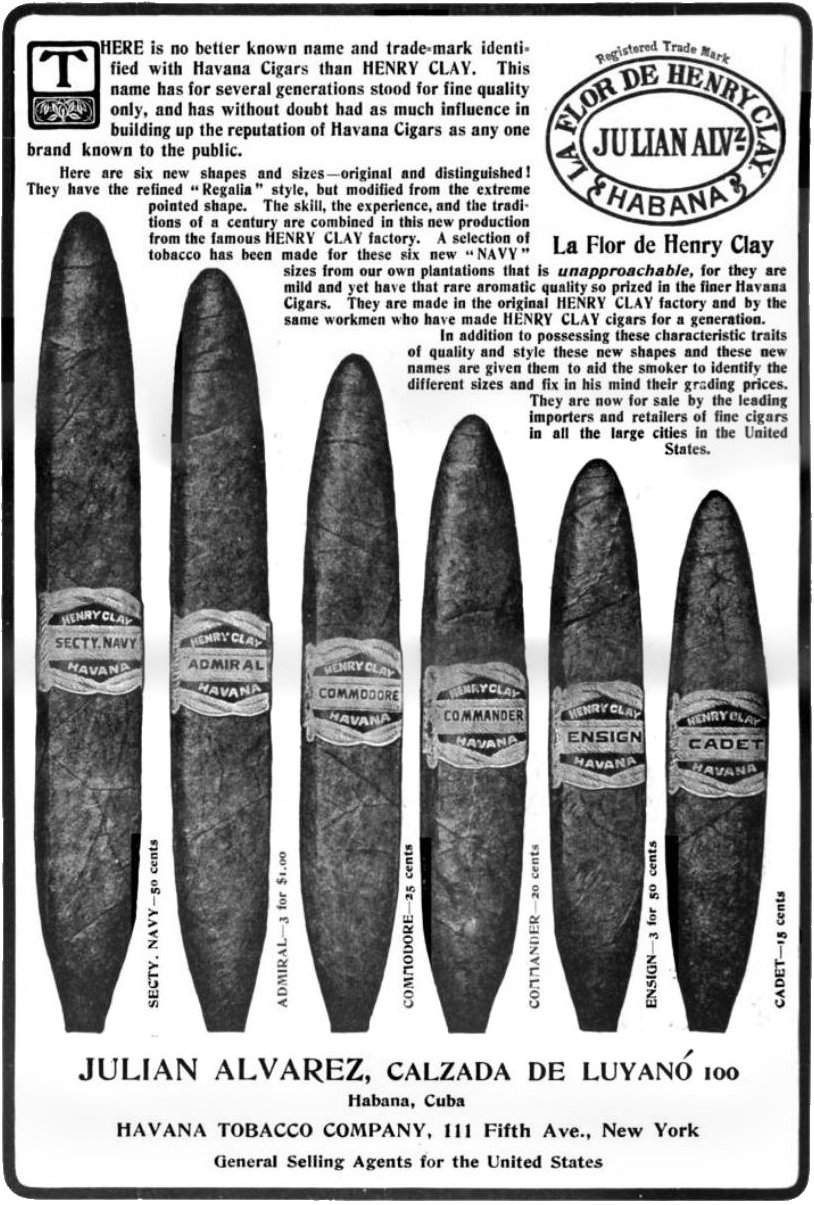
1905 Henry Clay advertisement

Henry Clay was founded in the 1840s by a Spanish immigrant to Cuba, Julián Álvarez Granda. The brand was nationalized by Fidel Castro's government following the Cuban Revolution, and manufacturing was severely reduced throughout the 1960s.

The cigar's American trademark was owned by Henry Clay and Bock & Co. Ltd., located in Trenton, New Jersey. Henry Clay and Bock & Co. Ltd. became a component of the Tobacco Trust that, along with other trusts, was an object of the antitrust legislation of the United States.

By 1986, Henry Clay's American trademark was owned by Consolidated Cigar Corporation, which started producing non-Cuban Henry Clays. The Consolidated Cigar Corporation was eventually purchased by Altadis.

== In popular culture ==
- In the Russian and Soviet poet, playwright, and actor Vladimir Vladimirovich Mayakovsky's 1925 poem Блек энд уайт/Black and White, which portrayed issues of racism and capitalist exploitation, the setting is a Henry Clay and Bock & Co. Ltd. cigar factory in Havana.
- Maurice Leblanc's gentleman thief Arsène Lupin was noted to have used a Henry Clay cigar to conceal a reply to an invented associate as a part of his escape from jail in Arsène Lupin in Prison.
- In the 1929 film Blackmail, the blackmailer is offered a Henry Clay cigar but instead chooses a Corona.
- In George Simenon's novel Pietr the Latvian, the book's namesake is observed by Inspector Maigret smoking a Henry Clay cigar.
- The Kurt Weill song 'Matrosen-Tango' (Sailor-Tango) includes the lyric "Und Zigarren rauchen wir Henry Clay... Denn andere Zigarren, die rauchen wir nicht" (And we smoke Henry Clay cigars... we don't smoke any other cigars).
- In Thomas Mann's 1924 novel The Magic Mountain, the character Hofrat Behrens remarks that he almost died smoking "two small Henry Clay's".
- In chapter 15 of James Joyce's Ulysses, the character of subsheriff Long John Fanning is described as "smoking a pungent Henry Clay."
- In chapter 12 of Jean-Paul Sartre's 1945 novel The Age of Reason, the character Boris writes in a letter that he smoked a Henry Clay to the end without the ash falling.
