= Henry Clay and Bock & Co. Ltd. Cigar Factory =

- Henry Clay and Bock & Company Ltd. Cigar Factory
- U.S. National Register of Historic Places
- New Jersey Register of Historic Places
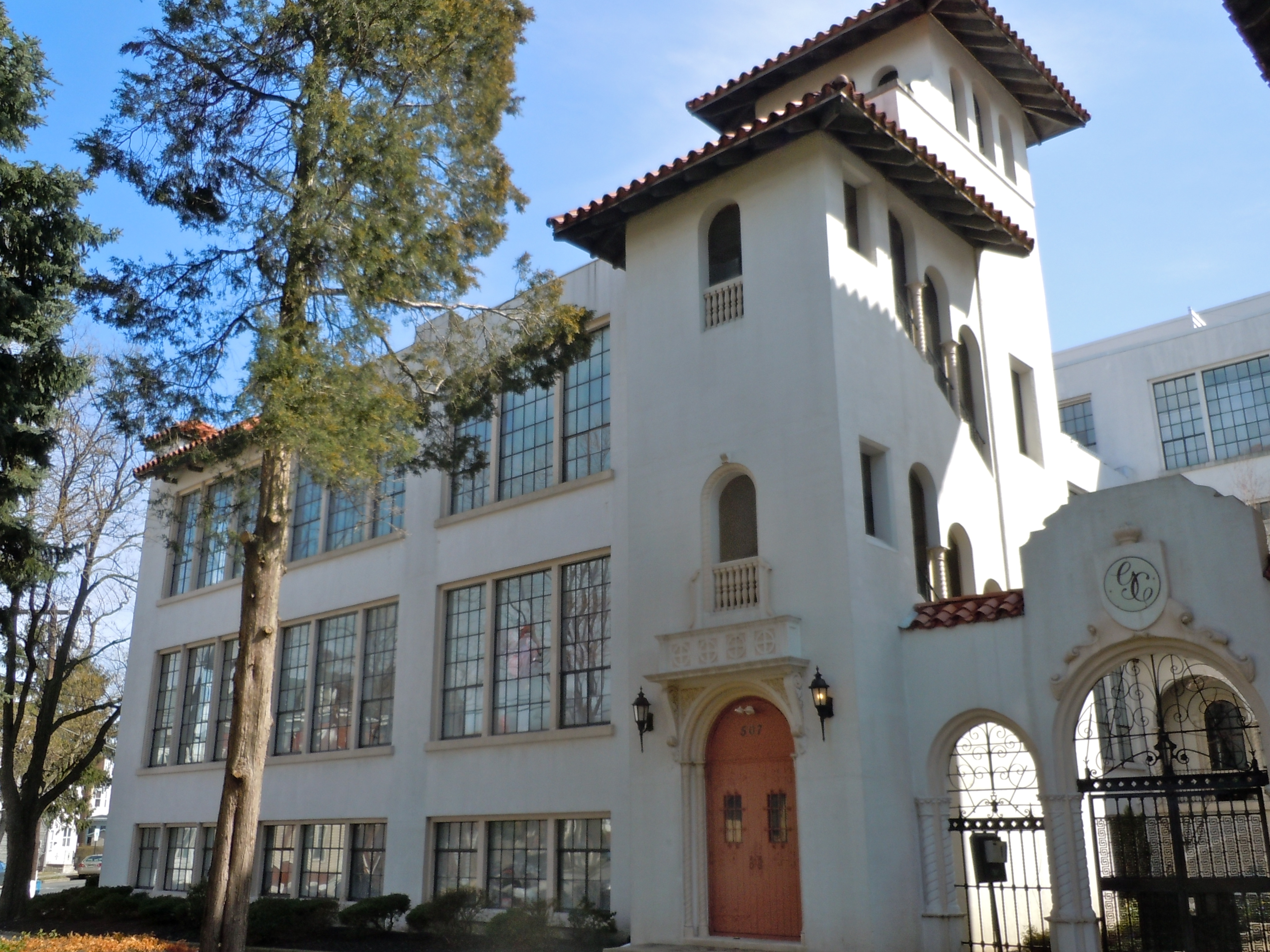

- Location within Mercer County, New Jersey Location within New Jersey Location within the United States
- Location: 507 Grand Street, Trenton, New Jersey
- Coordinates: 40°12′10″N 74°44′43″W
- Area: 2.4 acres (0.97 ha)
- Built: 1932
- Architect: Francisco & Jacobus
- Architectural style: Spanish Revival
- NRHP reference No.: 79001500
- NJRHP No.: 1764

Significant dates
- Added to NRHP: June 12, 1979
- Designated NJRHP: May 29, 1979

The Henry Clay and Bock & Company Ltd. Cigar Factory is a historic industrial building located at 507 Grand Street in the Chambersburg neighborhood of Trenton, New Jersey. It was built in 1932 by Henry Clay and Bock & Co. Ltd. to house the hand production of fine cigars and is considered the most architecturally distinct industrial building in the city, having been designed in the Spanish Revival style to highlight the Cuban origins of the company. It was added to the National Register of Historic Places on June 12, 1979 for its significance in architecture and industry.

== History ==
The company moved cigar production from Cuba to Trenton in 1932 after a strike at the Cuban factory, and in order to avoid high tariffs. Brands produced at the plant included Henry Clay, Bock, La Corona, and Village Brands, among others, with Winston Churchill counted a faithful customer. At its peak in the 1930s the company produced a quarter of the fine cigar market in the United States, with 3000 employees at the Trenton plant. The factory was closed in 1967 and production moved to Pennsylvania. The building was converted to apartments in the 1980s.

== See also ==
- National Register of Historic Places listings in Mercer County, New Jersey
