= Nottingham Township, New Jersey =

Former township of New Jersey, United States

Coordinates: 40.232°N 74.705°W

Nottingham Township was a township that existed for almost 168 years in New Jersey, United States, from 1688 until it was dissolved in 1856.

The township was created on November 6, 1688, as a part of nascent Burlington County in the Province of West Jersey, representing half of the future Province of New Jersey. It was incorporated by an Act of the New Jersey Legislature as one of the State of New Jersey's initial group of 104 townships on February 21, 1798. On February 22, 1838, the township became part of the newly formed Mercer County.

On February 28, 1840, the Borough of South Trenton, New Jersey was created, and annexed in 1851 as part of Trenton. Hamilton Township was created on April 11, 1842, from portions of Nottingham, reducing its once sprawling territory to a long sliver of land running between the Delaware River and the Delaware and Raritan Canal. Portions of the township were annexed by Bordentown borough (now a city) on February 13, 1849.

Nottingham Township was dissolved on April 14, 1856, with portions of its territory being split between Hamilton Township and Trenton.
