= Chef Vola's =

Italian restaurant in Atlantic City, New Jersey, U.S.

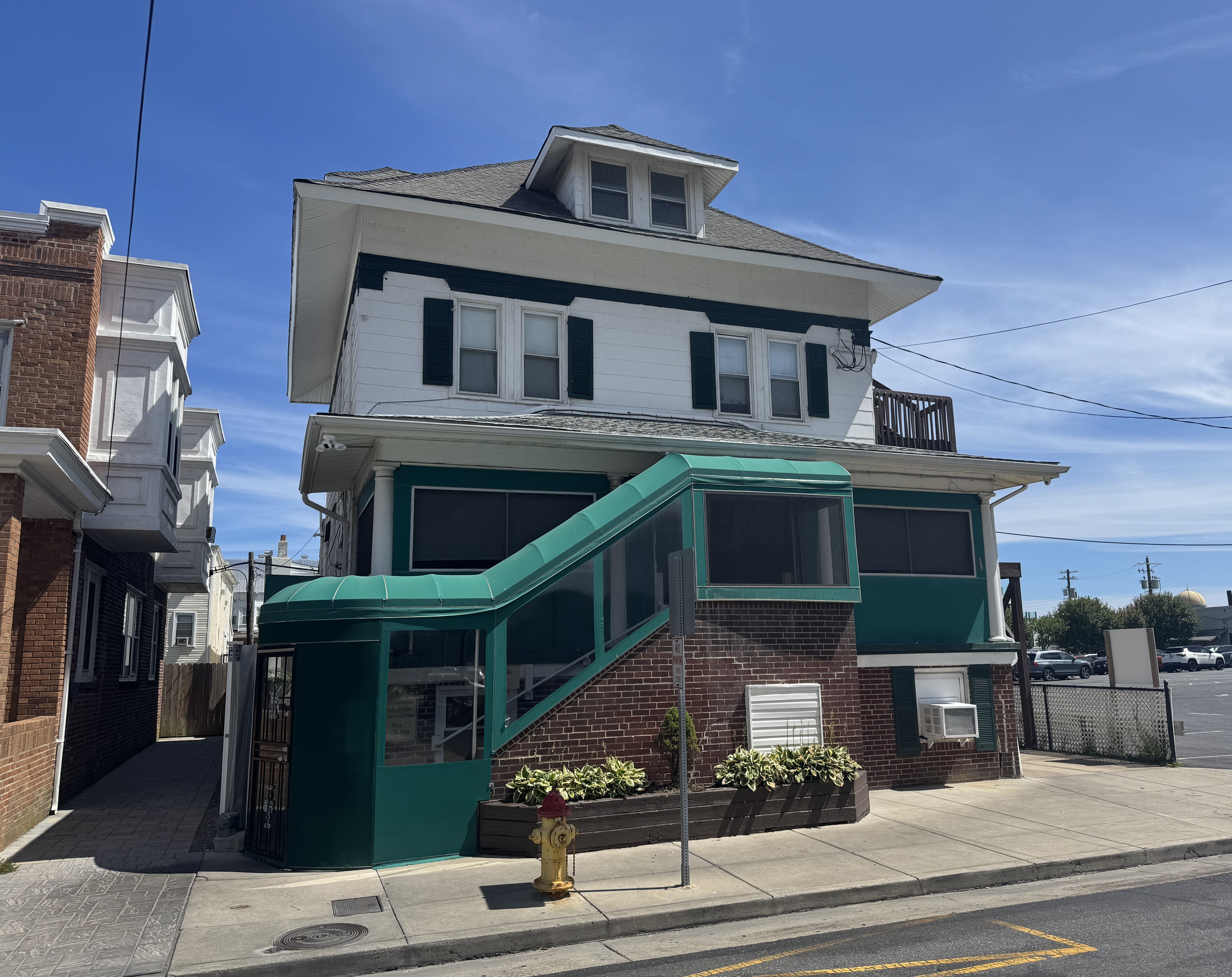
- The restaurant's exterior in 2025
- Interactive map of Chef Vola's

Restaurant information
- Established: 1921
- Food type: Italian
- Location: Atlantic City, New Jersey, United States
- Coordinates: 39.3535°N 74.4423°W
- Website: www.chefvolas.com

Chef Vola's is an Italian restaurant in Atlantic City, New Jersey. Established in 1921, the restaurant was named one of "America's Classics" by the James Beard Foundation in 2011.

== See also ==
- List of Italian restaurants
- List of James Beard America's Classics
- List of restaurants in New Jersey
