= American Cigar Company (Trenton, New Jersey) =

- American Cigar Company Building
- U.S. National Register of Historic Places
- New Jersey Register of Historic Places
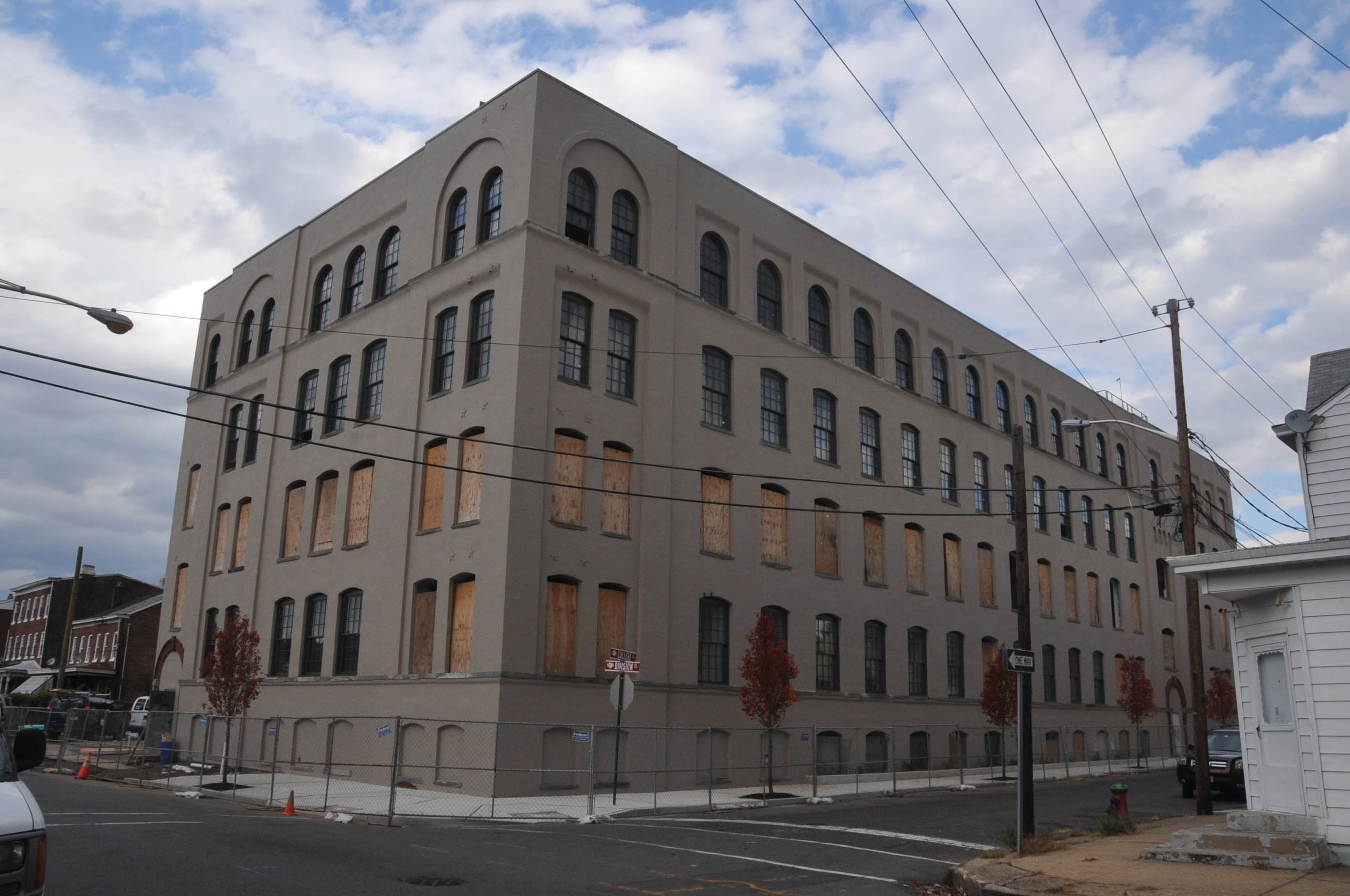
- The building under reconstruction

- Location within Mercer County, New Jersey Location within New Jersey Location within the United States
- Location: 176 Division Street, Trenton, New Jersey
- Coordinates: 40°12′44.3″N 74°44′41.0″W
- Built: 1903
- NRHP reference No.: 11000965
- NJRHP No.: 5052

Significant dates
- Added to NRHP: December 30, 2011
- Designated NJRHP: October 6, 2011

The American Cigar Company Building in the Chambersburg neighborhood of Trenton, New Jersey was established in 1903 by Albert Gold. In 1931 it employed 840 workers. It was added to the National Register of Historic Places in 2011 and has been converted into residential lofts.

== See also ==
- National Register of Historic Places listings in Mercer County, New Jersey
