= Hawaiian Cottage =

Defunct restaurant in Cherry Hill, New Jersey, U.S.

- Location within New Jersey Location within the United States

Restaurant information
- Established: 1938
- Closed: July 1, 1978
- Previous owners: Michael Egidi; Mary Egidi-Pietrafesa; John Muresan
- Coordinates: 39.9401°N 75.0148°W

The Hawaiian Cottage (or simply The Cottage) was a Polynesian style restaurant in Cherry Hill, New Jersey, United States. It opened in 1938, on Cherry Hill's western side, on Route 38, nearby the Cherry Hill Mall (which later opened in 1961). The Cottage was established by Michael Egidi and Mary Egidi-Pietrafesa. Started as a roadhouse, the restaurant soon emerged into what was considered a South Jersey landmark. The restaurant's exterior was known for its vivid yellow, pineapple-shaped dome, burning Polynesian torches at the entrance, and a Hawaiian atmosphere that included a luau show. After Mr. Egidi's death in a car accident in the early 1940s, Mrs. Egidi continued to operate the business. Her second husband, John Muresan, helped with the restaurant's growth. On July 1, 1978, the restaurant was destroyed by a fire.

Both John and Mary Muresan died in 1997.
