= Hoagie Haven =

Coordinates: 40.35220°N 74.65186°W

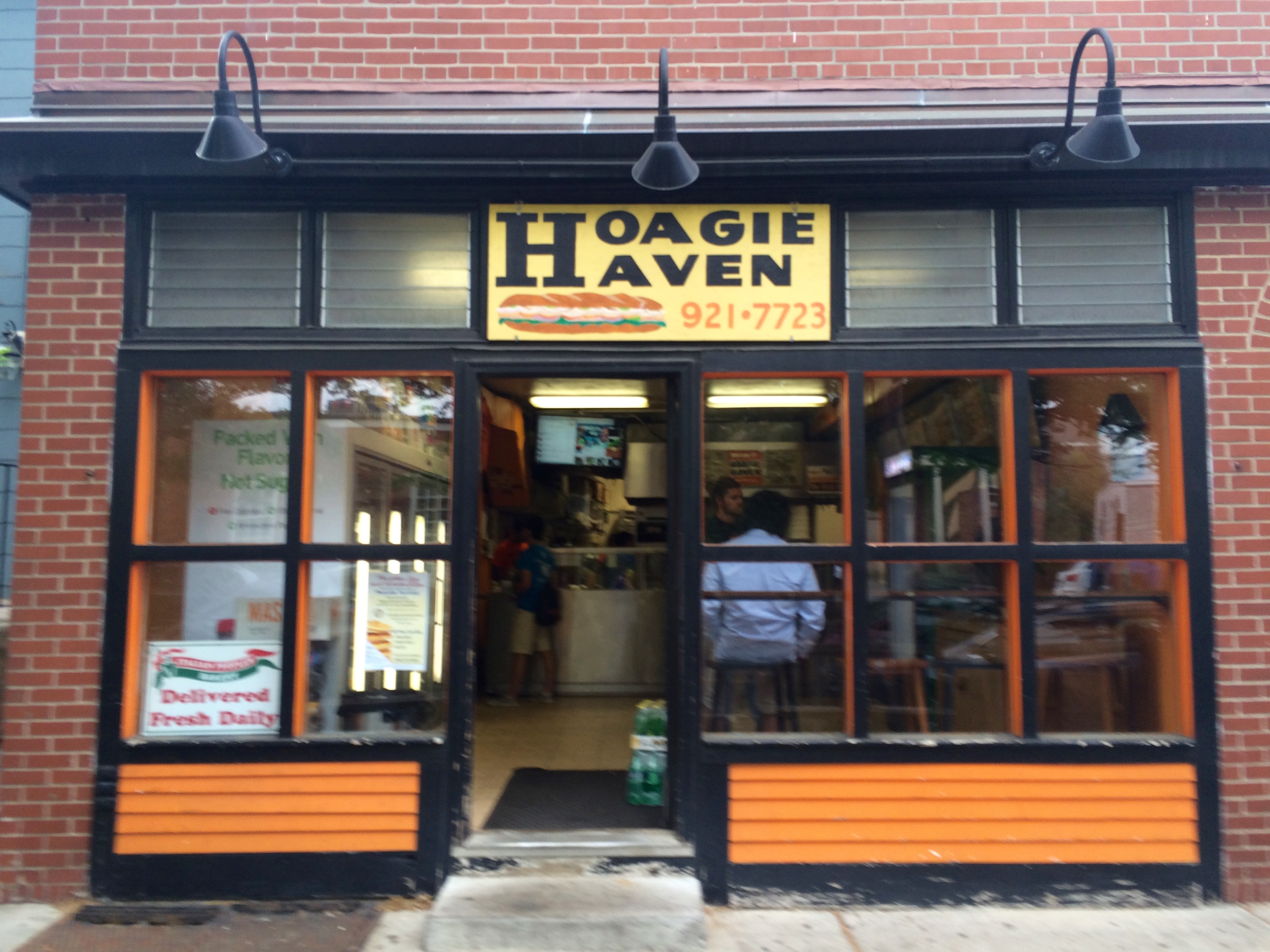
- Interactive map of Hoagie Haven

Restaurant information
- Established: 1974
- Owners: Mike Maltabes; Niko Maltabes; Costa Maltabes
- Food type: North American cuisine
- Dress code: Casual
- Location: 242 Nassau St, Princeton, New Jersey, 08542, United States
- Website: www.hoagiehaven.com

Hoagie Haven (also known as Haven or The Haven) is an eatery located in Princeton, New Jersey, founded in 1974. In 1976, Emily and George Roussos purchased the restaurant and retained the name Hoagie Haven. The store was repurchased from the Russos in 2005 and is currently owned by Mike, Niko, and Costa Maltabes.

== History ==
The store was owned by Emily and George Roussos in 1976 after they purchased the eatery from relatives. They provided an informal dining location for students and residents looking for a quick meal. In 1988, Hoagie Haven sold the restaurant to George Angeletopoulos and Konstantinos Liras under a 15-year contract. The Roussos founded the neighboring George's Roasters & Ribs in 1993, which they managed until 2005. Angeletopoulos's contract expired in 2003 and they returned to Greece. Emily and George Roussos returned as owners and brought back many features they took with them including a hand-crank cash register from the store's opening.

In 2005, Mike, Niko, and Costa Maltabes, relatives of George Angeletopoulos, purchased Hoagie Haven and George's Roasters & Ribs from the Russos. In 2012, the Maltabes opened the pizzeria, Slice Between, located between the two eateries and currently own all three dining establishments. Subway opened a store on 252 Nassau St. to compete with the Haven. In 2015, the Subway franchise closed, having proved unprofitable. Local news sources cited the Haven's strong customer loyalty and quoted residents who considered the Haven to provide better food at a better price.

== Menu ==
The menu features a variety of items, most of which include hot and cold hoagies, cheesesteaks, hamburgers, fries, gyros, sandwiches, and soups. Haven offers some specialty sandwiches including the Body Bag, Heart Stop, The Bloch, and the Sanchez. Haven also added several Fat Sandwiches in 2003 inspired by the Grease Trucks stationed at Rutgers University. Among the most popular with locals is the Phat Lady, a cheesesteak topped with french fries and mozzarella sticks in the bun.

== Popular culture ==
Hoagie Haven is a hot spot in Princeton. Many residents and students from Princeton University and neighboring high schools regularly eat at the Haven and it remains popular throughout the night. Hoagie Haven serves between 300 and 500 hoagie orders per day and is supplied by Italian Peoples Bakery. Hoagie Haven was referred to on The Daily Show as one of Jon Stewart's favorite restaurants during an interview with John Popper. Among locals, it is sometimes jokingly called "Hoggie Heaven". The restaurant appeared in the series The Newsroom and Your Friends and Neighbors.
