= Razza (surname) =

Razza is a surname. Notable people with the surname include:

- Luigi Razza (1892–1935), Italian journalist and politician
- Ruggero Razza (born 1980), Italian politician
