= Roebling Machine Shop =

- U.S. National Register of Historic Places
- New Jersey Register of Historic Places
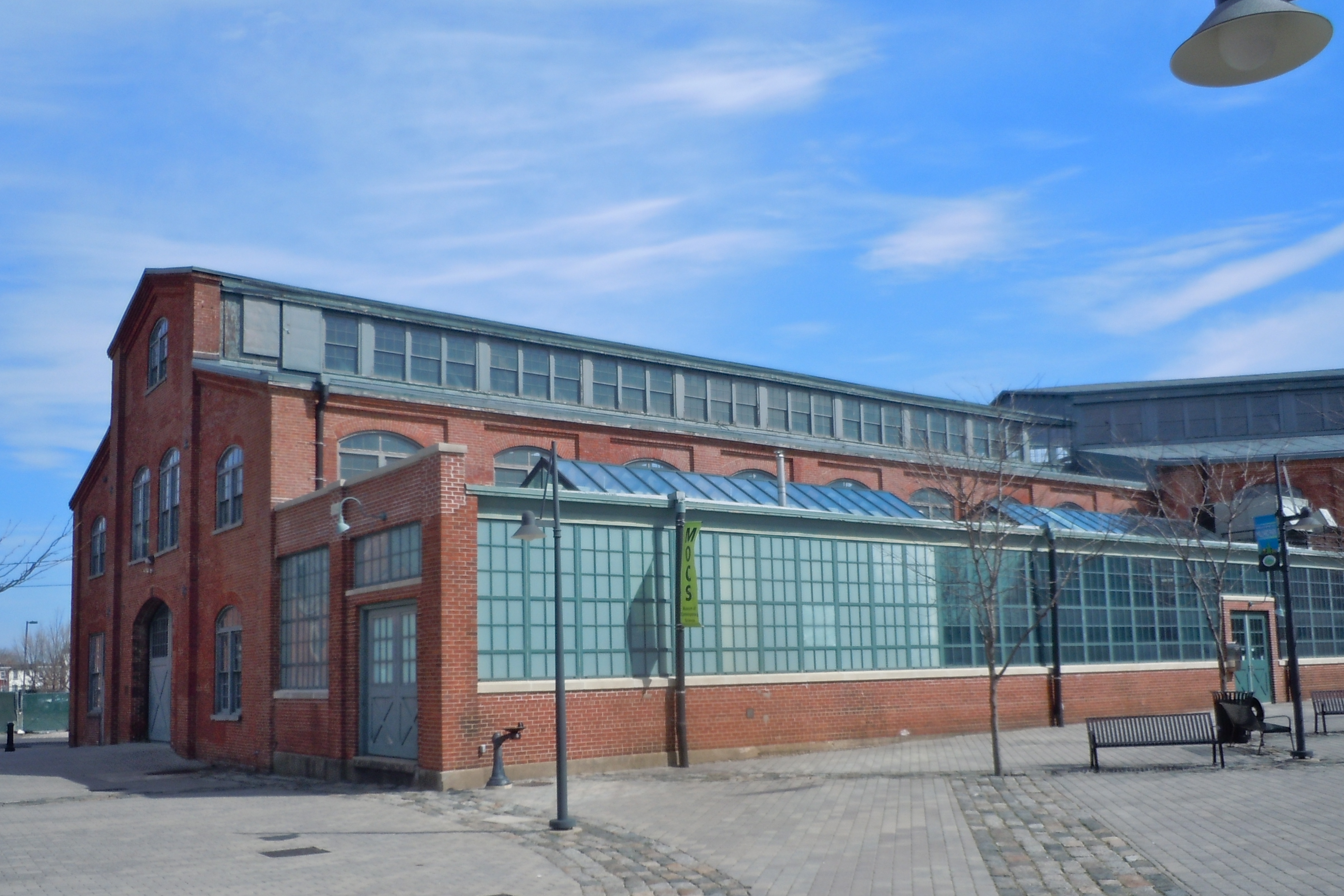

- Location within Mercer County, New Jersey Location within New Jersey Location within the United States
- Location: 675 South east Clinton Avenue, Trenton, New Jersey
- Coordinates: 40°12′35″N 74°45′11″W
- Area: 1.16 acres (0.47 ha)
- Built: 1890, 1901
- Architect: Roebling, Charles
- Architectural style: Industrial Basilica
- NRHP reference No.: 97000932
- NJRHP No.: 3279

Significant dates
- Added to NRHP: September 4, 1997
- Designated NJRHP: July 7, 1997

Roebling Machine Shop is located in Trenton, Mercer County, New Jersey, United States. The machine shop was built in 1890 and added to the National Register of Historic Places on September 4, 1997.

== See also ==
- John A. Roebling's Sons Company, Trenton N.J., Block 3
- National Register of Historic Places listings in Mercer County, New Jersey
- John A. Roebling
