= The Brass Rail (Hoboken, New Jersey) =

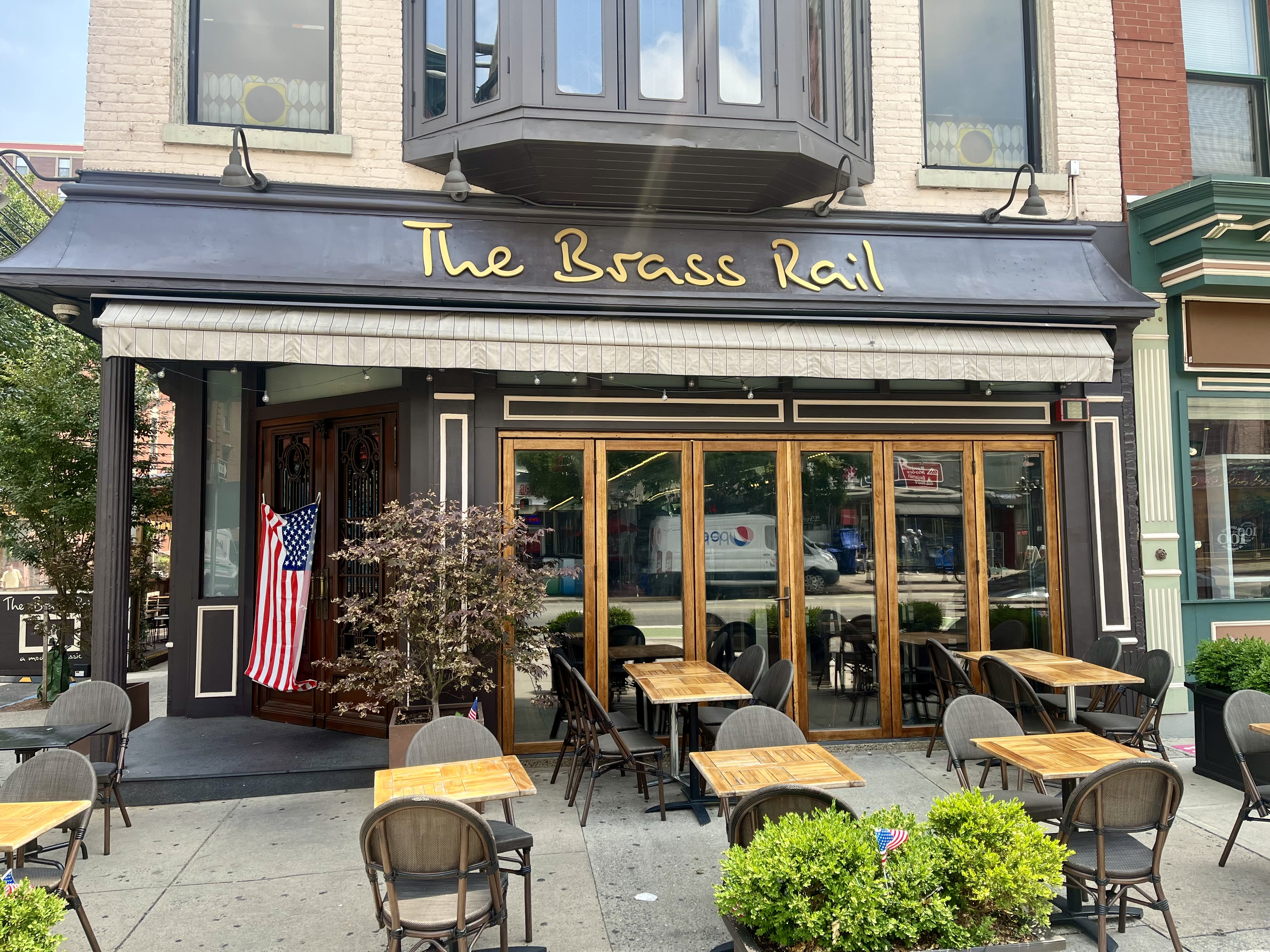
- The restaurant's exterior in 2024
- Interactive map of The Brass Rail

Restaurant information
- Location: 135 Washington Street, Hoboken, New Jersey, New Jersey, 07030, United States
- Coordinates: 40°44′19″N 74°1′49″W
- Website: www.thebrassrailnj.com

The Brass Rail is a restaurant in Hoboken, New Jersey, United States.

== Description ==
The Brass Rail is a two-story restaurant located in historic downtown Hoboken, at 135 Washington Street. Originally built and opened around the turn of the 20th century, it has for many years been known for its raspberry beer, as well as its French cuisine. Residents of Hoboken recommend the Brass Rail to visitors, although the restaurant does retain a local crowd. In the late 1970s and early 1980s, the Brass Rail was frequented by many poets, during an emerging literary revival period in Hoboken. They met there, drank and discussed their art. The restaurant in the 1980s was owned by Michael Peters, and the building suffered a devastating fire. It was reportedly caused by a careless smoker; the damage forced the building to close down, and Michael Peters sold the restaurant and opened up another restaurant in Kinsale, Ireland.

By 1989, the Brass Rail was rebuilt with etched-glass doors, red velvet banquettes and painted cherubs along the ceiling. The first floor holds the pub, while formal dining in a French salon style is on the second floor. Hanging on one of the walls of the Brass Rail is a large oil mural depicting the history of Hoboken. It has been restored to its original 1900s' style, and a wooden spiral staircase wraps around the wall facing Washington Street, which along the ground floor has been revamped into a part of a lounge.

== Reviews ==
A New York Times review called the Brass Rail "very good." Zagat has rated it as excellent.

== Sources ==
- Bell, Madison Smartt (1985). Waiting for the end of the world. Ticknor & Fields. pp. 322. ISBN 0-89919-377-3.
- Heide, Robert; Gilman, John (2006). O'New Jersey: Daytripping, Backroads, Eateries, Funky Adventures. Macmillan. pp. 259. ISBN 0-312-34156-3.
- Sullivan, Al (2001). Everyday people: profiles from the Garden State. Rutgers University Press. pp. 243. ISBN 0-8135-2950-6.
