= Italian Peoples Bakery =

Bakeries of the United States

Coordinates: 40.21269°N 74.75134°W

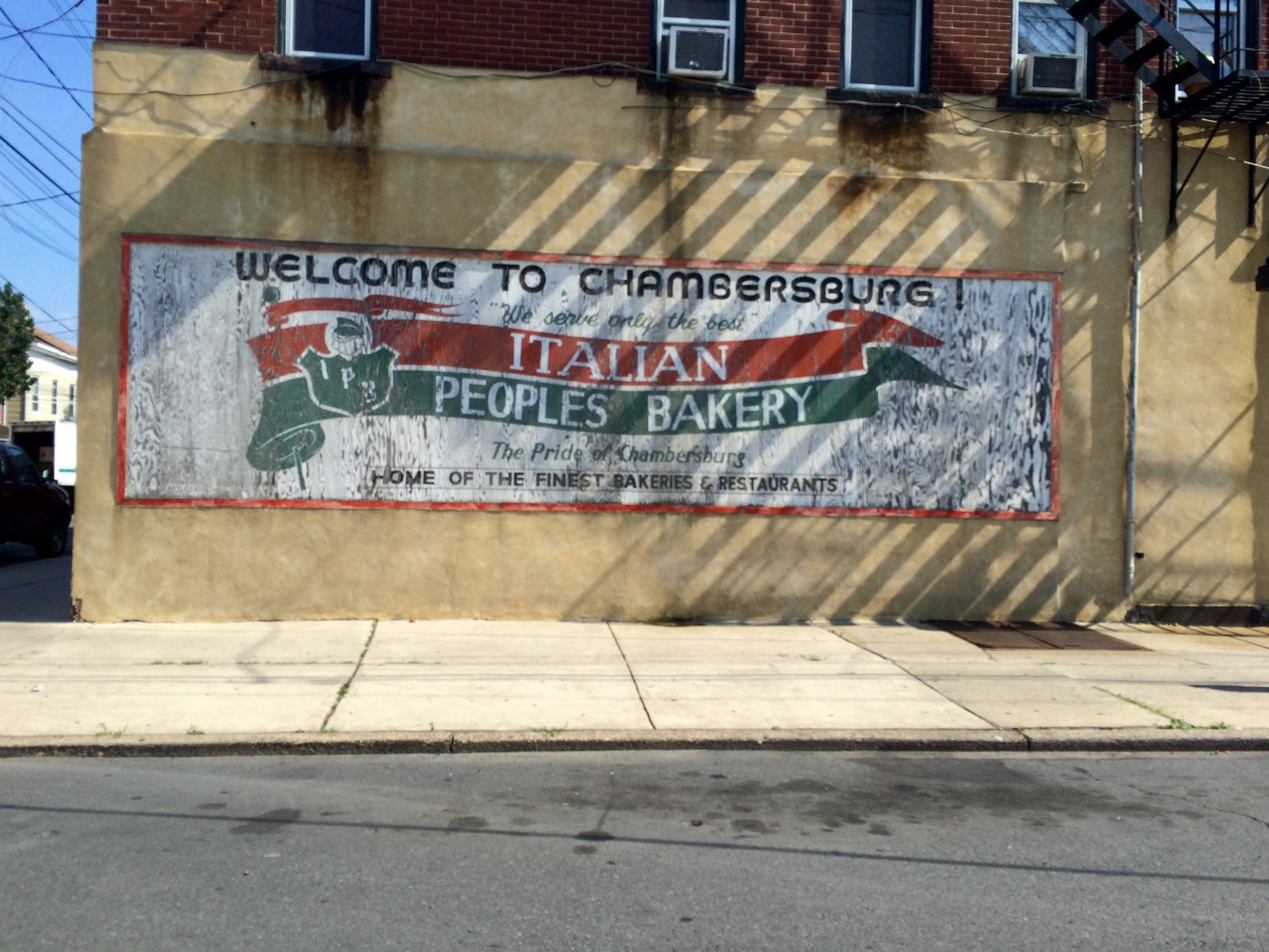
- Logo of the bakery on Butler Street

Restaurant information
- Established: 1936
- Owners: Carmen Guagliardo; Matthew Guagliardo
- Previous owners: Pasquale Gervasio; Joseph Guagliardo
- Food type: Bakery
- Dress code: Casual
- Location: 63 Butler St, Trenton, New Jersey, 08611, United States
- Other locations: Various other locations
- Website: www.italianpeoplesbakery.com

Italian Peoples Bakery is a bakery and delicatessen founded in 1936 and located in the Chambersburg neighborhood of Trenton, New Jersey. The bakery expanded to wholesale distribution of products and now serves parts of Pennsylvania and New Jersey.

== History ==
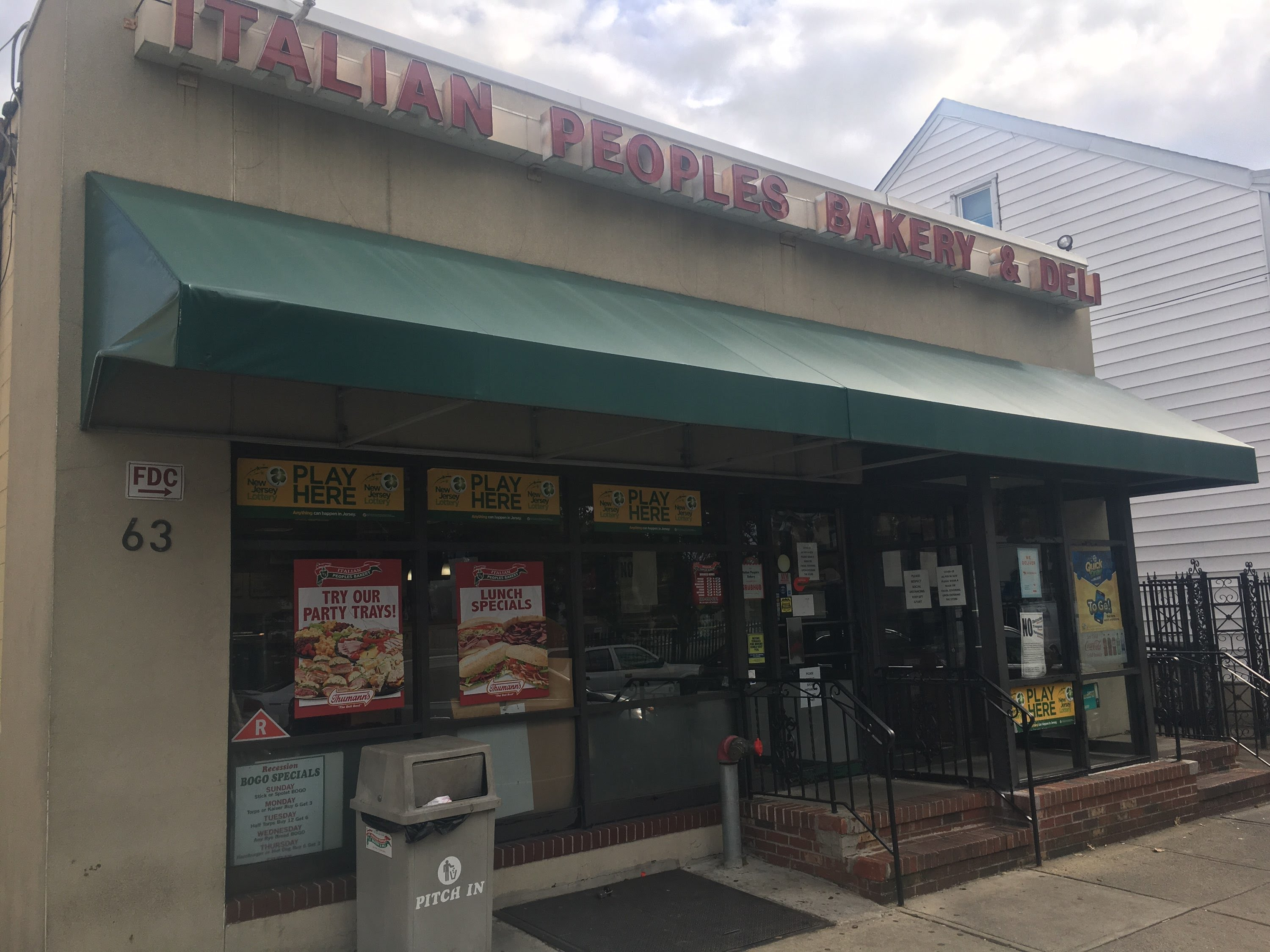
Entrance to the bakery on Butler St

The bakery of established in 1936 when Pasquale Gervasio opened a bakery on Hamilton Avenue in Trenton, New Jersey. The bakery was known for its bread spread and expanded over the years into wholesale distribution for local delis and supermarkets. Pasquale died in 1955. His family continued to operate the bakery until it was eventually purchased by Joseph Guagliardo, an in-law who formerly worked for General Motors. Ownership was later passed to his son, Carmen and grandson, Matthew. In 1956, the bakery was incorporated and moved into automated production. By 1990, the bakery had acquired Frey's Baking Company and New Colonial Bakery as production included sourdough rye.

On August 29, 1969, a major fire broke out in the bakery. The building was completely engulfed in flames also affecting the residents who lived upstairs, which included then owner Joseph Guagliardo, his wife, Phyllis, and son Carmen. According to Carmen, only the terrazzo floor survived the fire.

== Current status ==
The bakery's primary location is on 63 Butler St in Trenton. It supplies multiple restaurants and markets including Hoagie Haven. They serve for Thanksgiving and can be overloaded. The bakery is considered a cultural establishment for Italians in Trenton. The bakery remained opened during the COVID-19 pandemic with a focus on delivery. At the end of March 2020, son of Carmen and part owner, Matthew Guagliardo said "the types of orders drastically change over the last couple of weeks".

In 2016, the bakery became an 80-year family owned business.
