= Abbott Farm Historic District =

Historic district in New Jersey, United States

- U.S. National Register of Historic Places
- U.S. National Historic Landmark District
- New Jersey Register of Historic Places
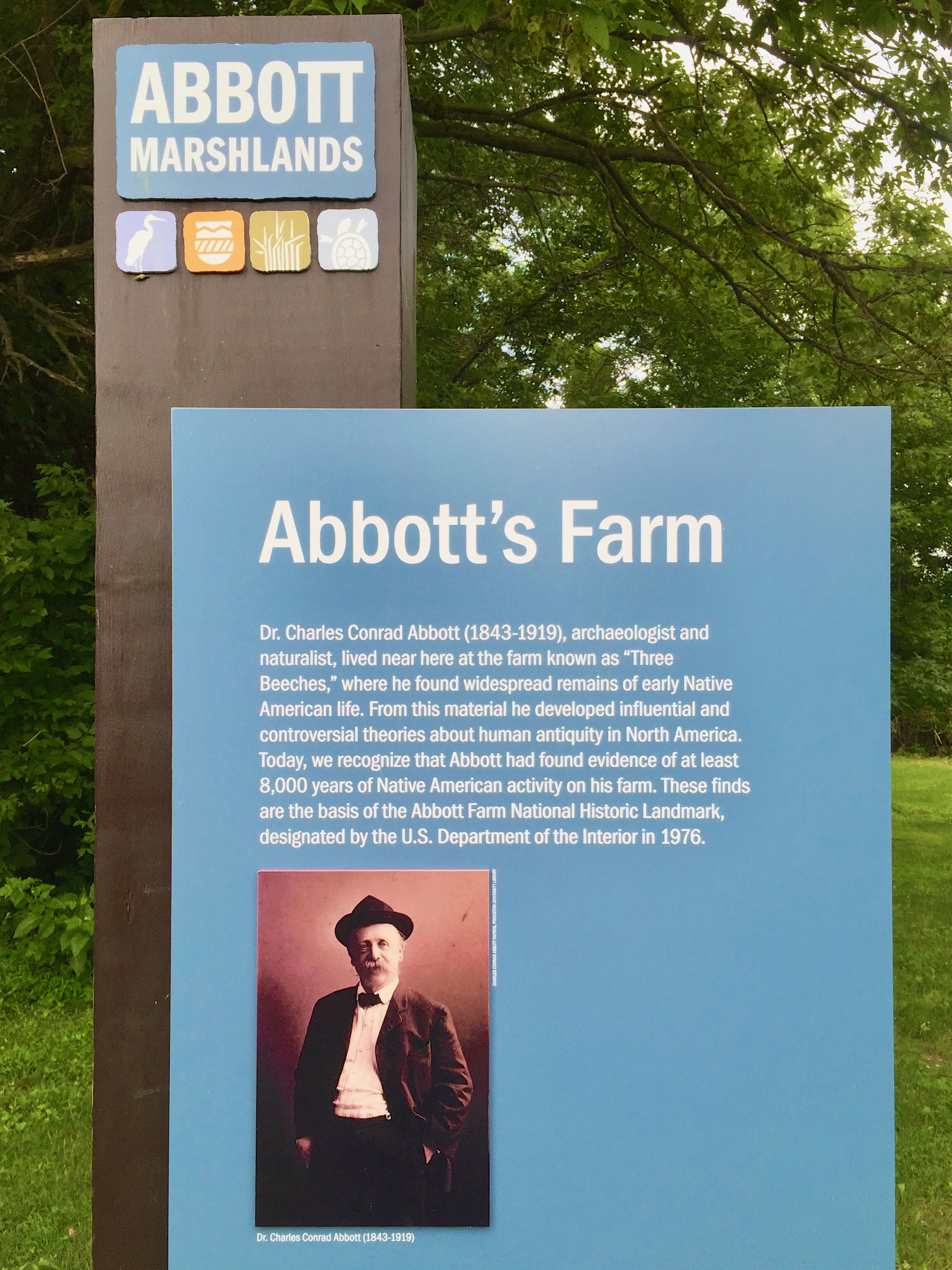
- Abbott Marshlands – Abbott's Farm

- Location within Mercer County, New Jersey Location within New Jersey Location within the United States
- Location: Hamilton Township, Bordentown City, and Bordentown Township, New Jersey
- Coordinates: 40°10′30″N 74°42′30″W
- Area: 2,000 acres (810 ha)
- NRHP reference No.: 76001158
- NJRHP No.: 1654

Significant dates
- Added to NRHP: December 8, 1976
- Designated NHLD: December 8, 1976
- Designated NJRHP: August 16, 1979

The Abbott Farm Historic District is a National Historic Landmark archaeological site in New Jersey. It is the largest known Middle Woodland village of its type on the East Coast of the United States. Significant evidence suggests that the Delaware River floodplain was occupied by Paleoindian people for a long period. It was inhabited between 500 BC and 500 AD. It has been a source of controversy and debate around early development.

The district encompasses some 2,000 acres (810 ha) of marshlands and bluffs in southern Mercer County and northern Burlington County, in the municipalities of Hamilton Township, Bordentown City, and Bordentown Township. The John A. Roebling Memorial Park, part of the Abbott Marshlands, provides access to both historic sites and nature habitats in the area. The district was added to the National Register of Historic Places as the Abbott Farm Archeological Site on December 8, 1976 for its significance in prehistory and science.

The importance of this site was established in the late 19th century by Charles Conrad Abbott, an archaeologist whose farm was located on one of the bluffs overlooking the marshlands. Abbott's finds on his farm, published in 1876, sparked a debate about when humans first arrived in the area, and consequently had significant influence on the direction of later archaeological work. Many finds from the site are at Harvard University's Peabody Museum of Archaeology and Ethnology, for which Abbott served as assistant curator for many years.

== Historic sites ==
In addition to its archaeological importance, the area includes historically important buildings and transportation-related structures, such as:

- Bow Hill – Hamilton Township
- Isaac Watson House – Hamilton Township
- Point Breeze – Bordentown
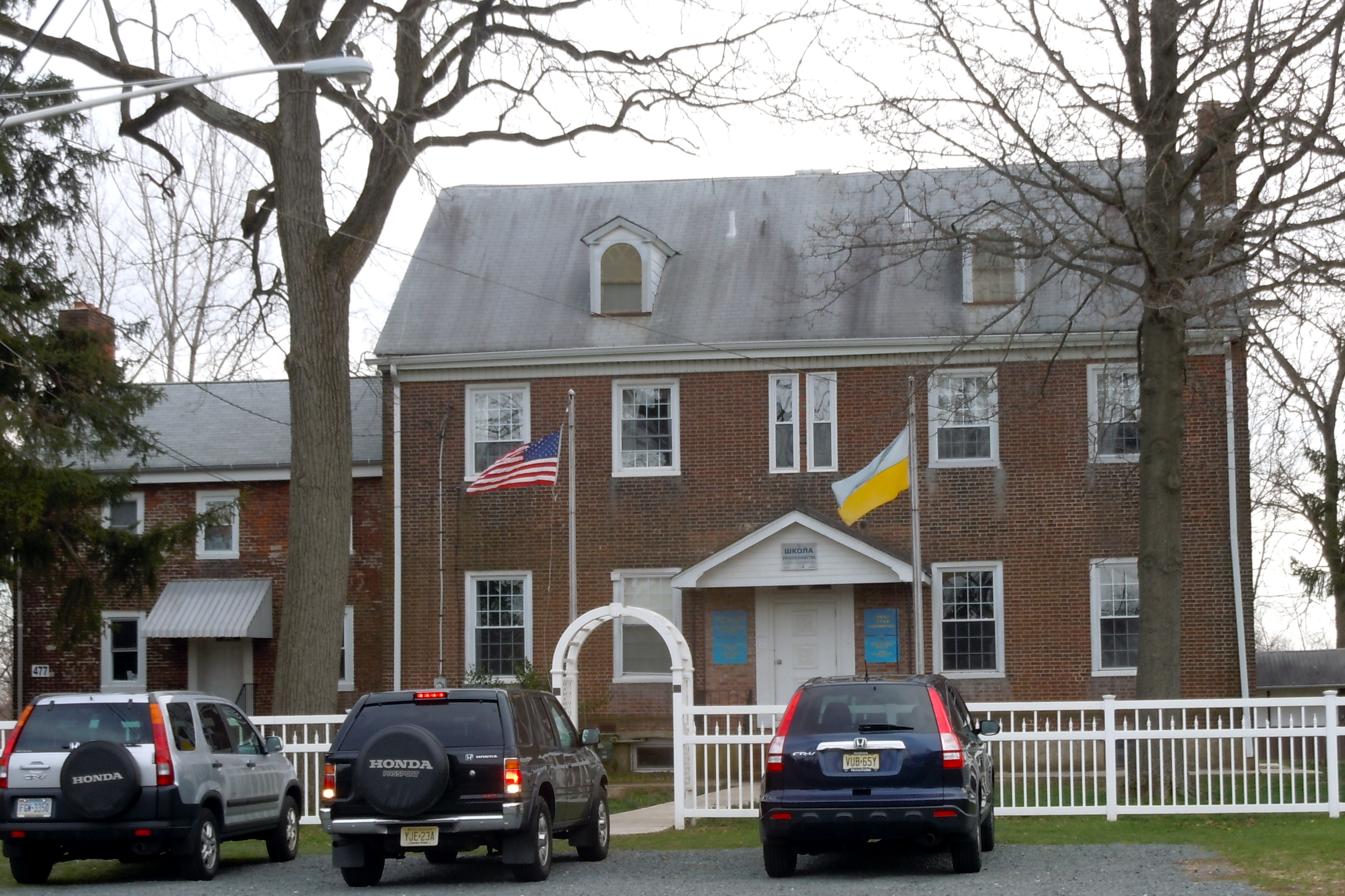
Bow Hill

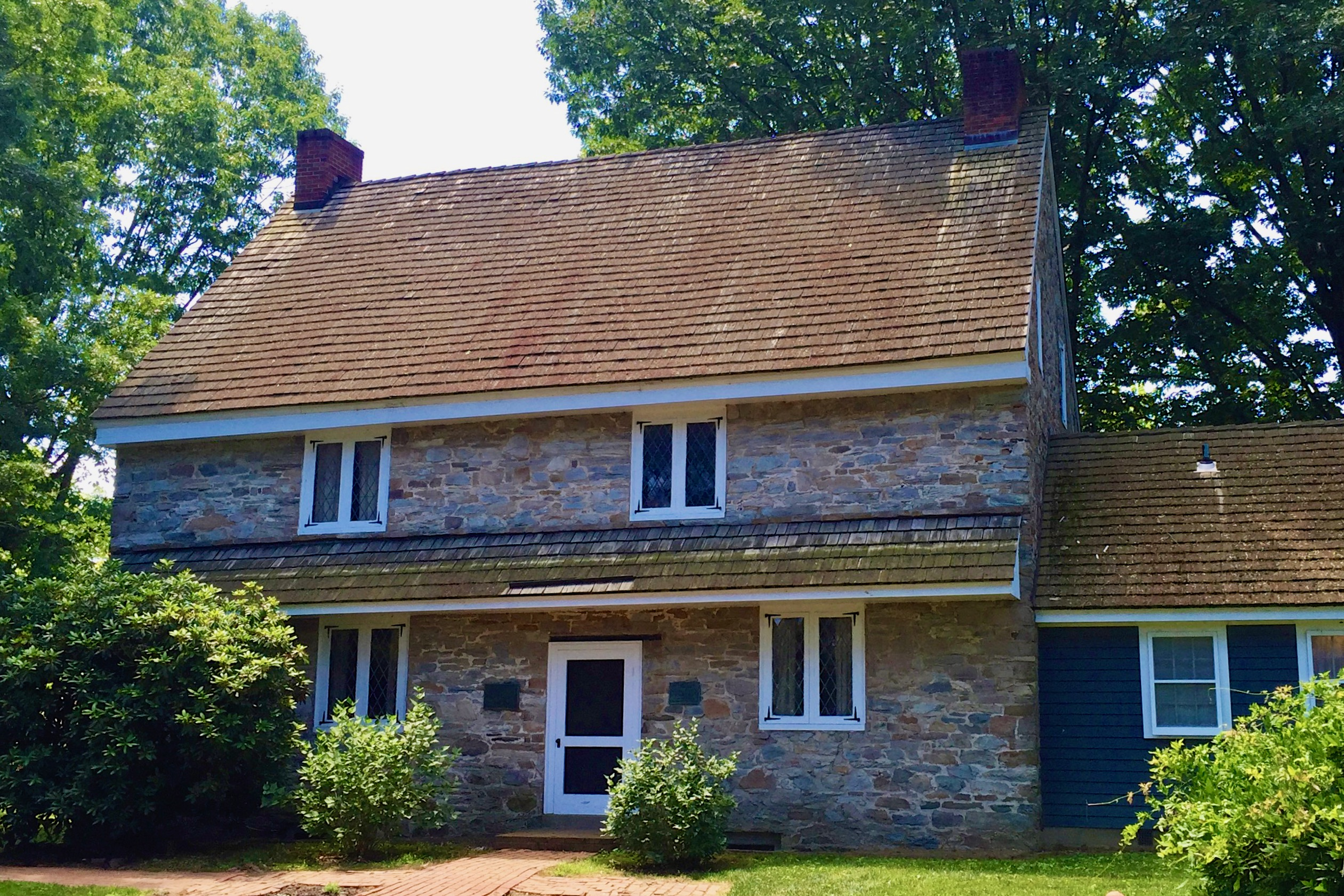
Isaac Watson House

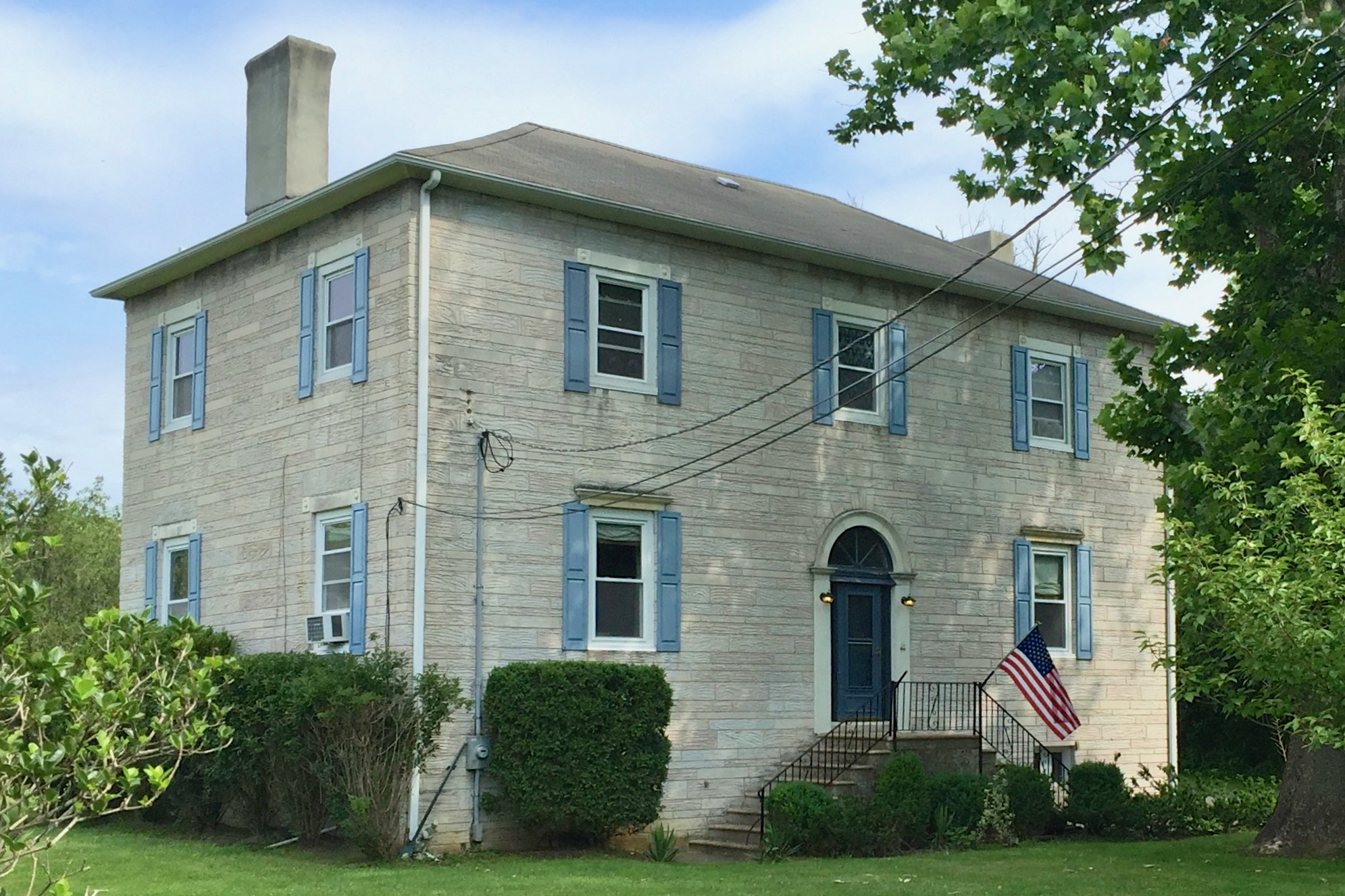
Point Breeze

== Gallery ==
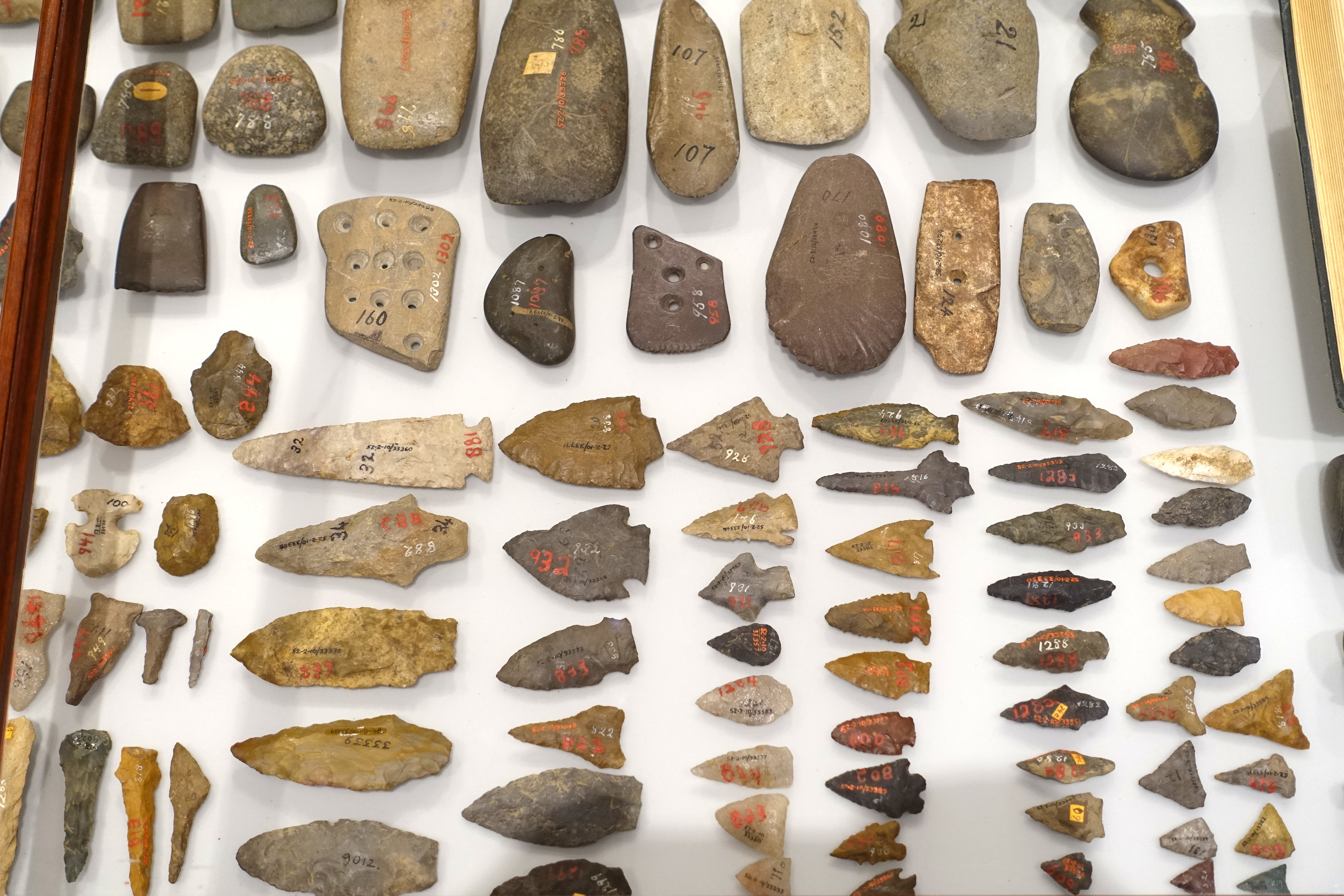
Artifacts at the Peabody Museum of Archaeology and Ethnology

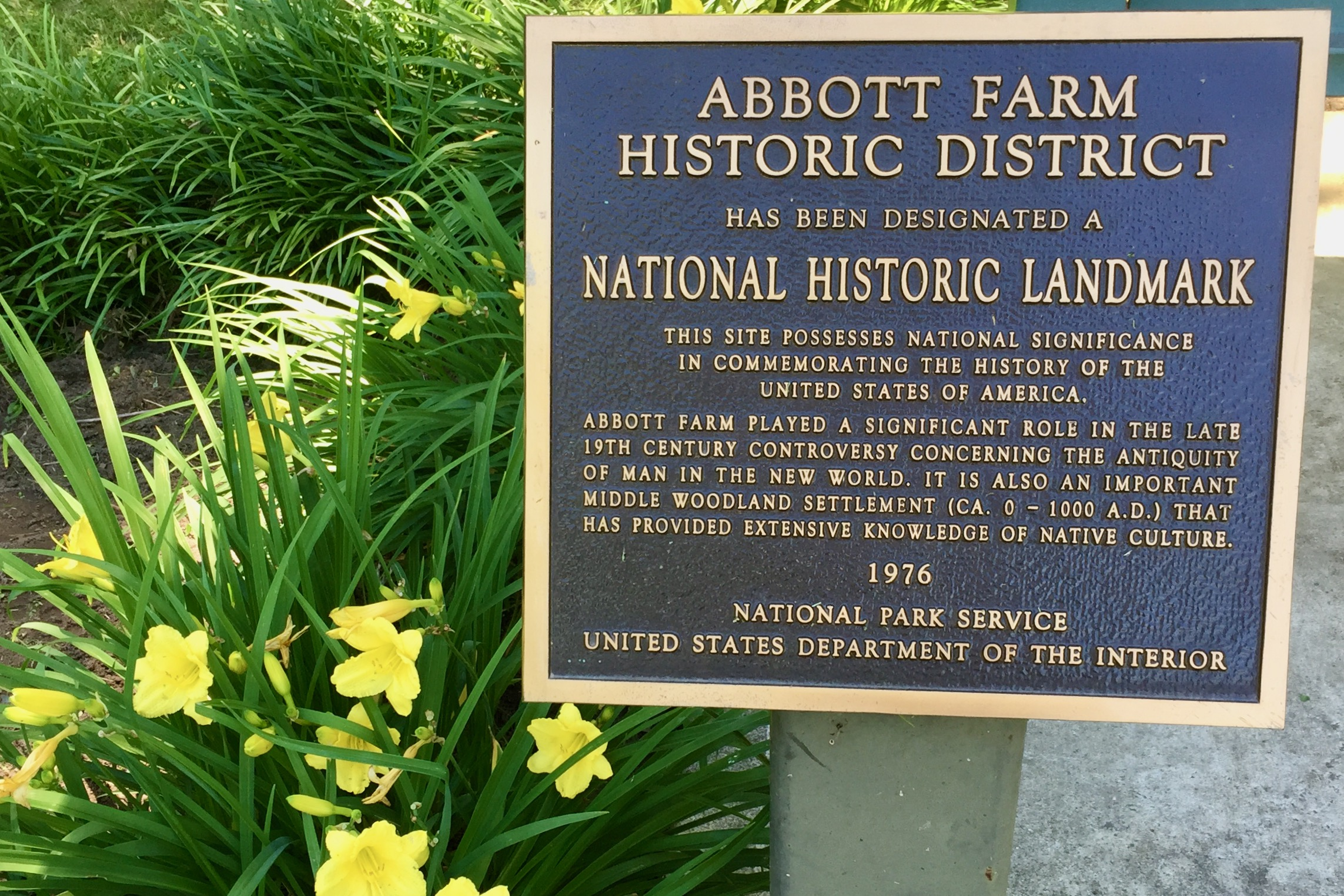
National Historic Landmark

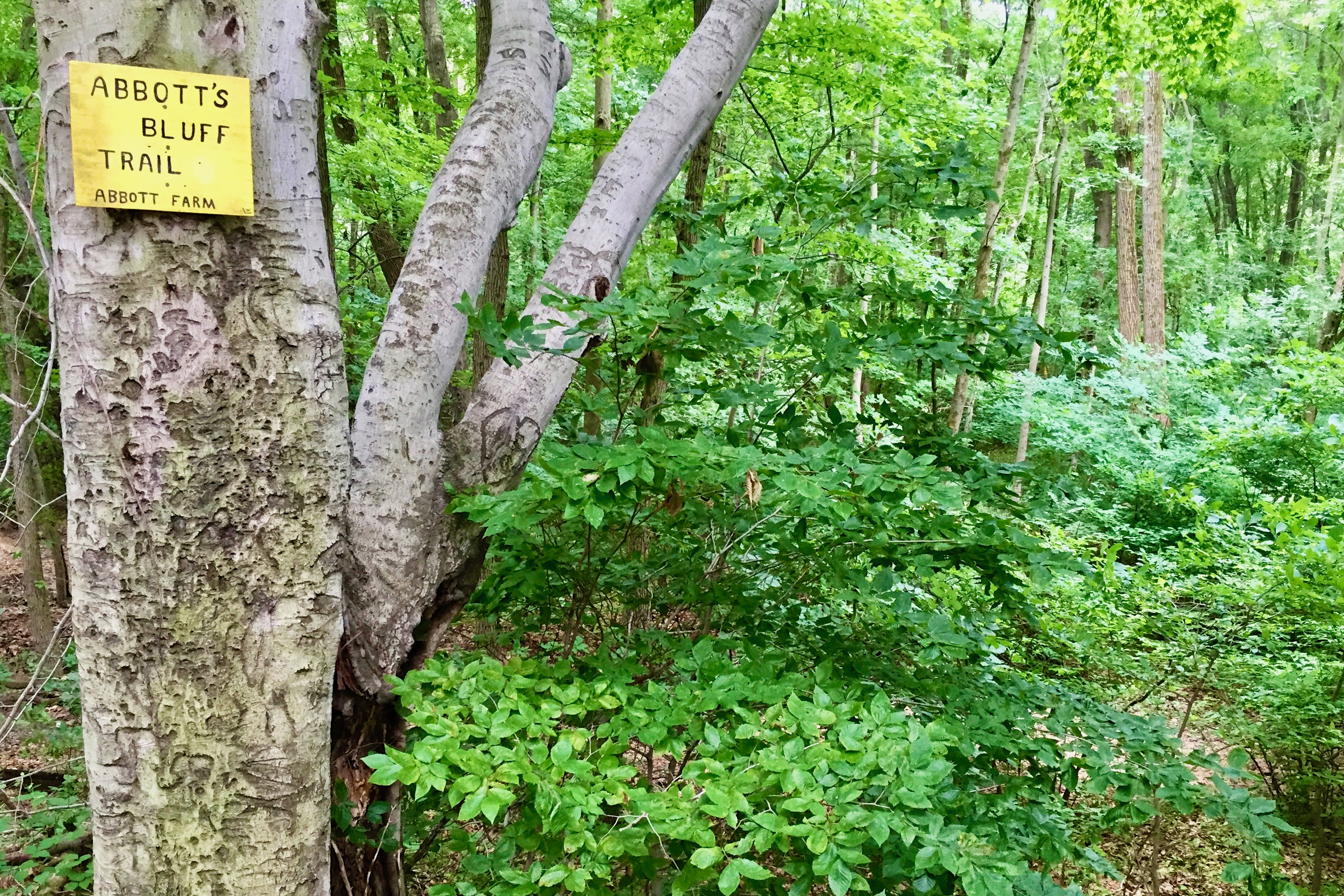
Abbott's Bluff Trail

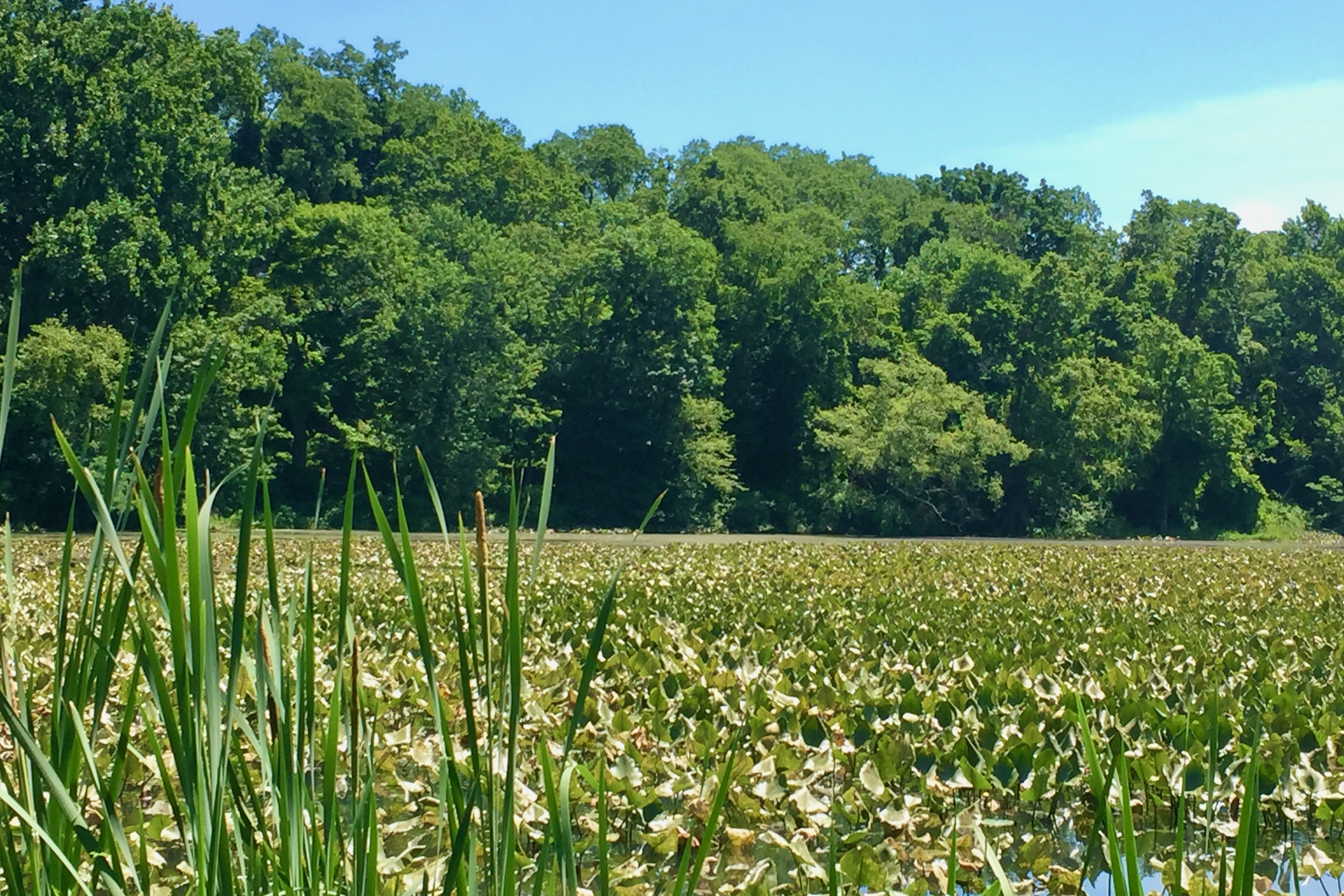
Sprint Lake in the John A. Roebling Memorial Park

== See also ==
- List of National Historic Landmarks in New Jersey
- Assunpink Trail
- Lenape Trail
- Minisink Archeological Site
- National Register of Historic Places listings in Burlington County, New Jersey
- National Register of Historic Places listings in Mercer County, New Jersey
