= Bow Hill =

Bow Hill may refer to:

- Bow Hill, Inverclyde, a prominent hill and cliff in Inverclyde, Scotland, UK
- Bow Hill, New Jersey, an historic building in Hamilton, New Jersey, USA
- Bow Hill, Sussex, a prominent hill and important archaeological site in Sussex, England, UK
