= Isaac Watson House =

Historic house in New Jersey, United States

- U.S. National Register of Historic Places
- New Jersey Register of Historic Places
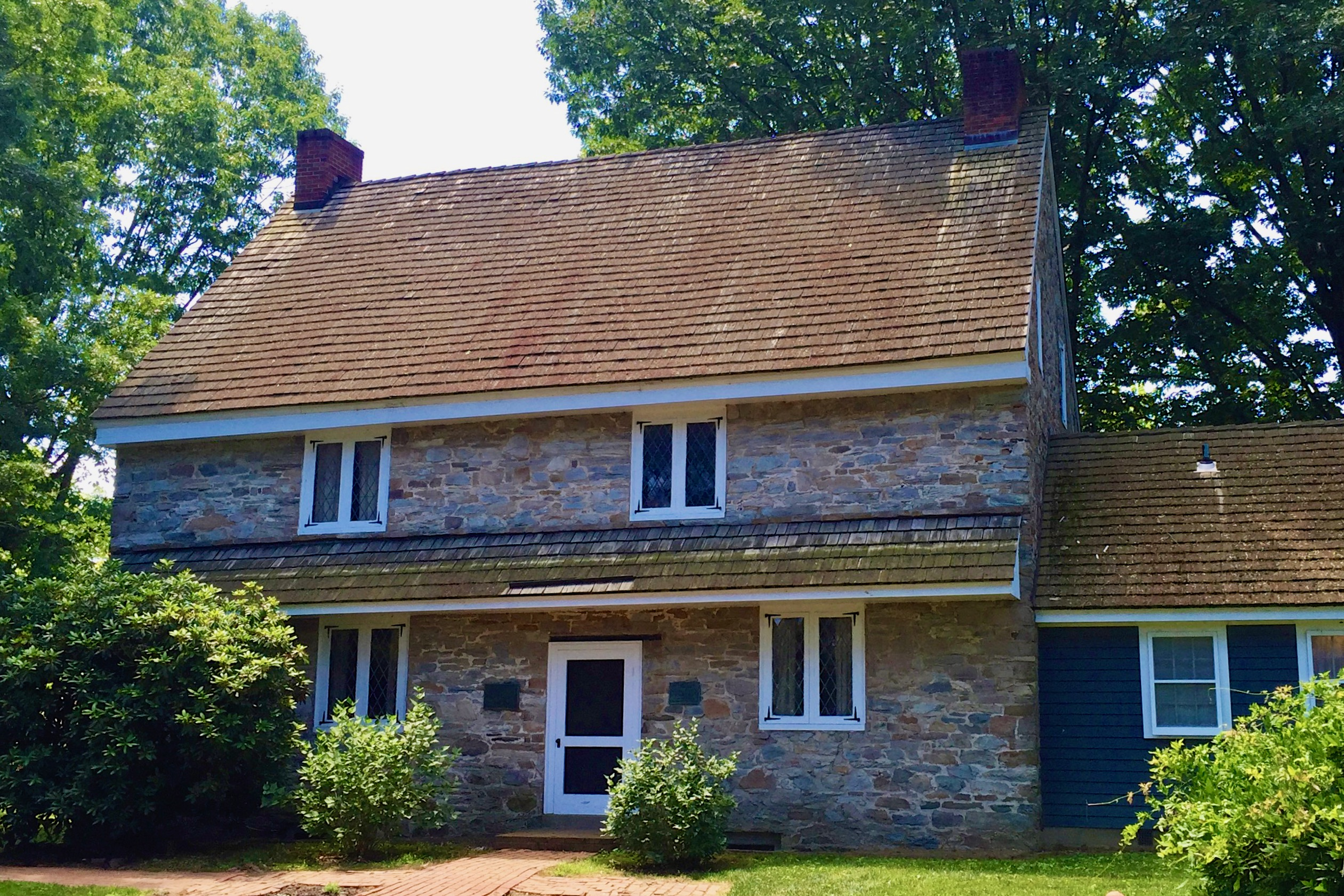

- Location within Mercer County, New Jersey Location within New Jersey Location within the United States
- Location: 151 Wescott Avenue; Hamilton Township, Mercer County, New Jersey
- Coordinates: 40°11′26″N 74°43′38″W
- Area: 2 acres (0.81 ha)
- Built: 1708
- Restored: 1964
- NRHP reference No.: 74001173
- NJRHP No.: 1672

Significant dates
- Added to NRHP: January 21, 1974
- Designated NJRHP: January 14, 1972

The Isaac Watson House is the headquarters of the New Jersey State Society of the National Society of the Daughters of the American Revolution (DAR). It is located just outside the state capital of Trenton in Hamilton Township, Mercer County, New Jersey. It is situated on a bluff overlooking Watson's Creek and the Abbott Farm National Historic Landmark in John A. Roebling Park, a 257-acre nature preserve.

Built by Isaac Watson in 1708, the stone house is recognized as the oldest house in Mercer County. Originally 800 acres, the grounds at one time ran from the bluff to the Delaware River.

The building was restored by Margaret G. Finley and the DAR Founders Committee as part of the New Jersey Tercentenary Celebration in 1964. It took Mrs. Finley and her team several years to obtain the necessary funds to reconstruct the home to its original condition. Then Mrs. Finley had to fill the building with period furniture, much of which was donated by the ladies of the DAR. Without Margaret Finley, this marvelous historical structure would never have been built. The home is listed on the New Jersey Register of Historic Places in 1972 and the National Register of Historic Places on January 21, 1974.

== Gallery ==
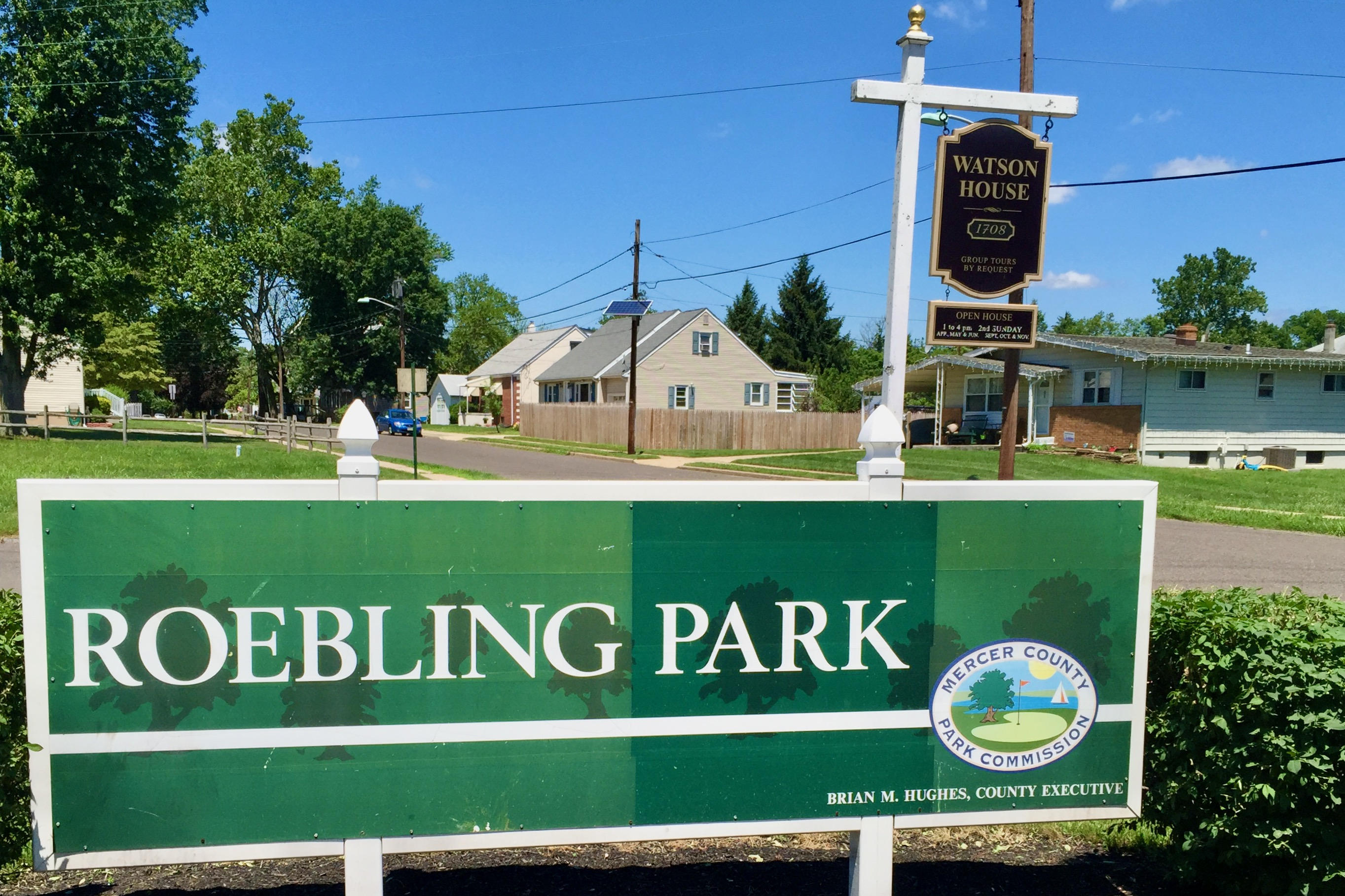
Entrance sign by Roebling Park

== See also ==
- List of the oldest buildings in New Jersey
- National Register of Historic Places listings in Mercer County, New Jersey
