= Bow Hill (New Jersey) =

Historic house in New Jersey, United States

- Bow Hill; Ukrainian American Cultural Center
- U.S. National Register of Historic Places
- New Jersey Register of Historic Places
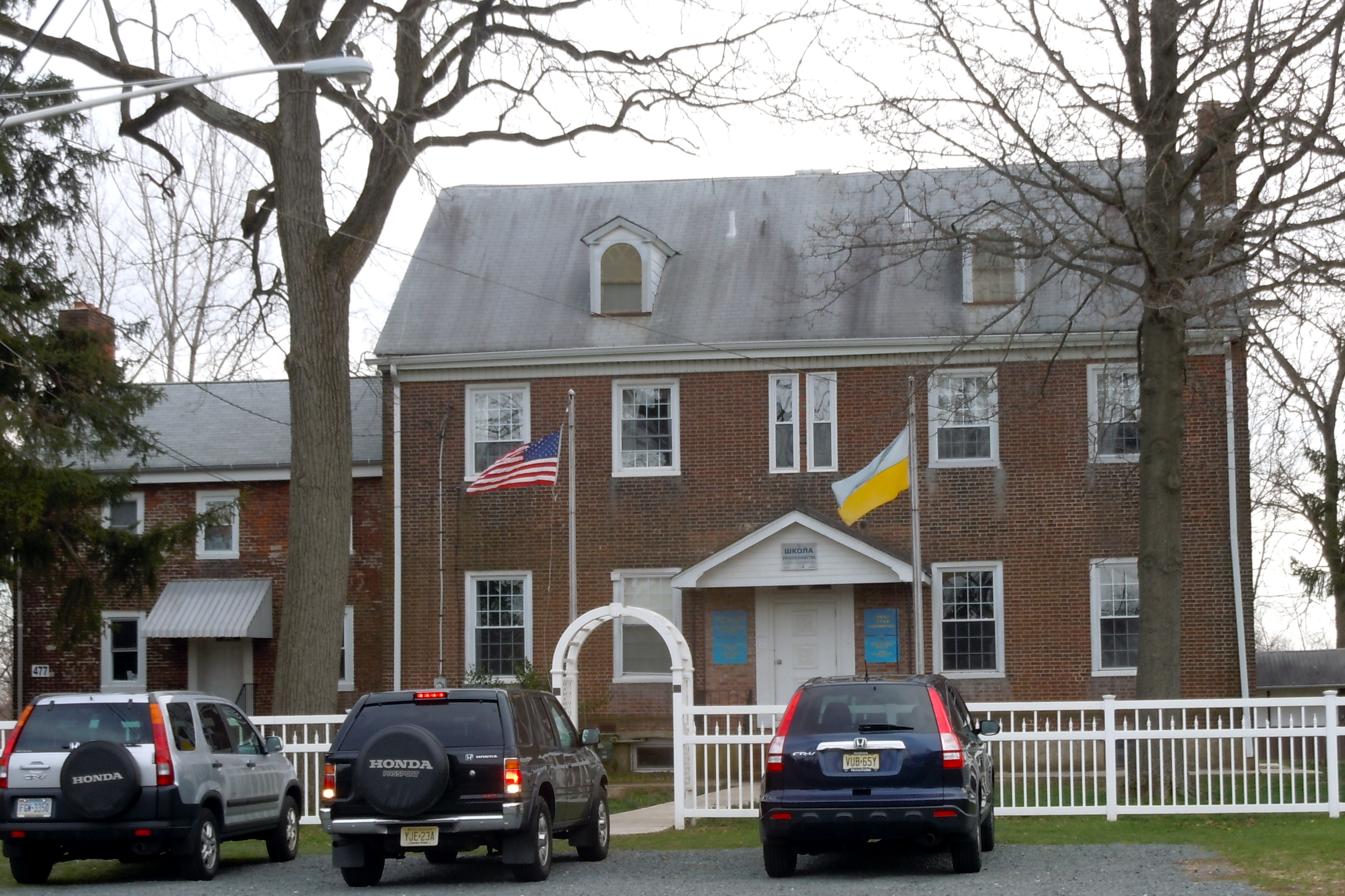

- Location within Mercer County, New Jersey Location within New Jersey Location within the United States
- Location: 477 Jeremiah Avenue, Hamilton Township, New Jersey
- Coordinates: 40°11′32″N 74°44′39″W
- Area: less than one acre
- Built: 1790
- Architectural style: Federal
- NRHP reference No.: 73001111
- NJRHP No.
- Added to NRHP: January 25, 1973

Bow Hill is a historic house located in Hamilton Township, Mercer County, New Jersey, United States. The building was built in 1790 and added to the National Register of Historic Places on January 25, 1973.

== History ==
The Bow Hill mansion was built by Barnt De Klyn, (often written D'Klyn), a Boston-born descendant of French Huguenot nobility and his wife Mary van Zant, a Knickerbocker from Pearl Street, Manhattan. De Klyn became wealthy selling textiles to the Continental Army during the American Revolution, and in the 1780s, acquired a large tract of land along the Delaware River outside of Trenton, New Jersey at a time where speculation was that Trenton, being midway between Philadelphia and New York City would be the nation's capital. De Klyn and other speculators were crushed financially when the capital was decided to be built in what became Washington, DC, but by the time he had heard the news, he had finished constructing this mansion.

Among De Klyn's circle of friends was King Joseph Bonaparte, Napoleon's older brother, who rented Bow Hill from De Klyn to house his American wife Annette Savage, while he was living in exile at Point Breeze in nearby Bordentown, New Jersey. Bonaparte rented Bow Hill for Annette, a Quaker from Philadelphia, until 1822, when they moved to another property in New York.

Bow Hill was owned by the DeKlyn family (later the Lalors) through the 20th century. In 1975, it was purchased by the Ukrainian-American community of Trenton and consecrated as the Ukrainian National Home, later renamed the Ukrainian American Cultural Center which continues to this day. This center has housed numerous Ukrainian organizations, including the scouting organization Plast, the School of Ukrainian Studies, the Self-Reliance Federal Credit Union, the Ukrainian American Veterans, the Ukrainian National Women's League of America and the Ukrainian-American Soccer Club.

== See also ==
- National Register of Historic Places listings in Mercer County, New Jersey
