= Eagle Tavern =

Eagle Tavern may refer to:

- Eagle Tavern (Eagle, Pennsylvania), a historic tavern in Pennsylvania
- Eagle Tavern (Dover, Delaware), listed on the National Register of Historic Places in Kent County, Delaware
- Eagle Tavern (Watkinsville, Georgia), listed on the National Register of Historic Places in Oconee County, Georgia
- Eagle Tavern (Trenton, New Jersey), listed on the National Register of Historic Places in Mercer County, New Jersey
- Eagle Tavern (Halifax, North Carolina), listed on the National Register of Historic Places in Halifax County, North Carolina
- Eagle Tavern (Upper Makefield Township, Pennsylvania), listed on the National Register of Historic Places in Bucks County, Pennsylvania
