= Oliver H. Smith =

American politician (1794–1859)

Oliver Hampton Smith
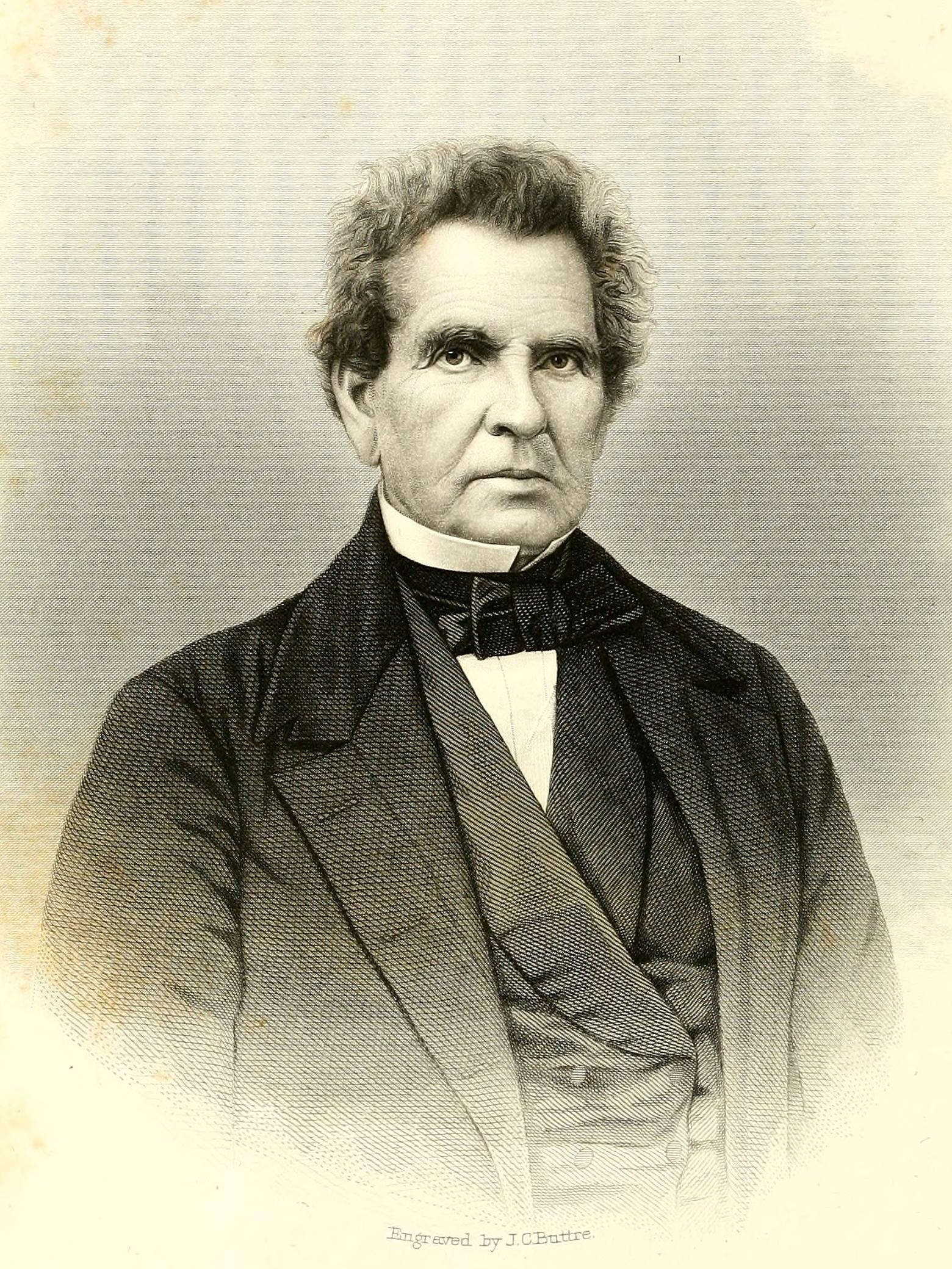

Indiana House of Representatives
- In office 1822–1824

Member of the United States House of Representatives from Indiana's 3rd district
- In office March 4, 1827 – March 3, 1829
- Preceded by: John Test
- Succeeded by: John Test

United States Senator from Indiana
- In office March 4, 1837 – March 3, 1843
- Preceded by: William Hendricks
- Succeeded by: Edward A. Hannegan

Personal details
- Born: October 23, 1794 Upper Makefield Township, Pennsylvania, U.S.
- Died: March 19, 1859 (aged 64) Charlestown, Indiana, U.S.
- Resting place: Crown Hill Cemetery and Arboretum, Indianapolis, Indiana, U.S., Section 12, Lot 9
- Party: Democratic-Republican; Whig
- Profession: Lawyer

Oliver Hampton Smith (October 23, 1794 – March 19, 1859) was a United States representative and Senator from Indiana.

== Early life ==
Born on Smith's Island, near Trenton, New Jersey, (though one source instead states he was born at the Smith Family Farmstead in Upper Makefield Township, Pennsylvania) he attended the common schools and moved west, eventually settling in Lawrenceburg, Indiana in 1818. He studied law and was admitted to the bar in 1820, commencing practice in Connersville.

From 1822 to 1824, Smith was a member of the Indiana House of Representatives and was prosecuting attorney for the third judicial district, 1824–1825. As an attorney, he was the chief prosecutor in the trials of Andrew Sawyer, John Bridge Sr., and John Bridge Jr., three of the perpetrators of the Fall Creek massacre.

== Politics ==
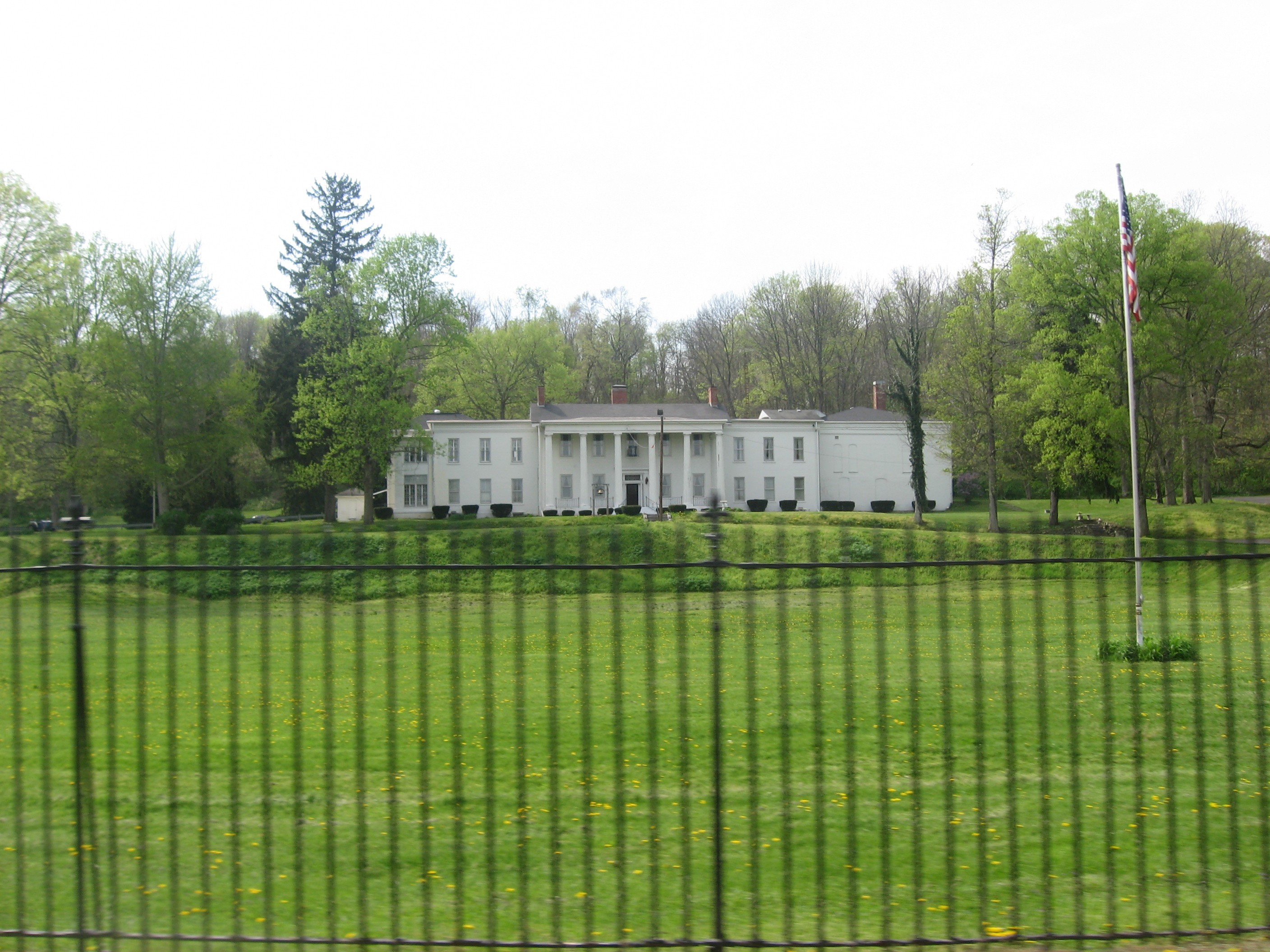
Elmhurst, Smith's Connersville home

Smith was elected to the Twentieth Congress (March 4, 1827–March 3, 1829) and was an unsuccessful candidate for reelection in 1828; he was then elected as a Whig to the U.S. Senate and served from March 4, 1837, to March 3, 1843. While in the Senate, he was chairman of the Committee on Engrossed Bills (Twenty-sixth Congress) and a member of the Committee on Public Lands (Twenty-seventh Congress). He was an unsuccessful candidate for reelection and moved to Indianapolis where he resumed the practice of law. He declined to be a candidate for Governor of Indiana in 1845 and engaged in the railroad business in Indianapolis. He died in that city in 1859; interment was in Crown Hill Cemetery.

U.S. Senate
| Preceded by William Hendricks | U.S. senator (Class 3) from Indiana; 1837–1843; Served alongside: John Tipton, Albert S. White | Succeeded by Edward A. Hannegan |
