= John Burroughs Homestead =

Historic house in Pennsylvania, United States

- U.S. National Register of Historic Places
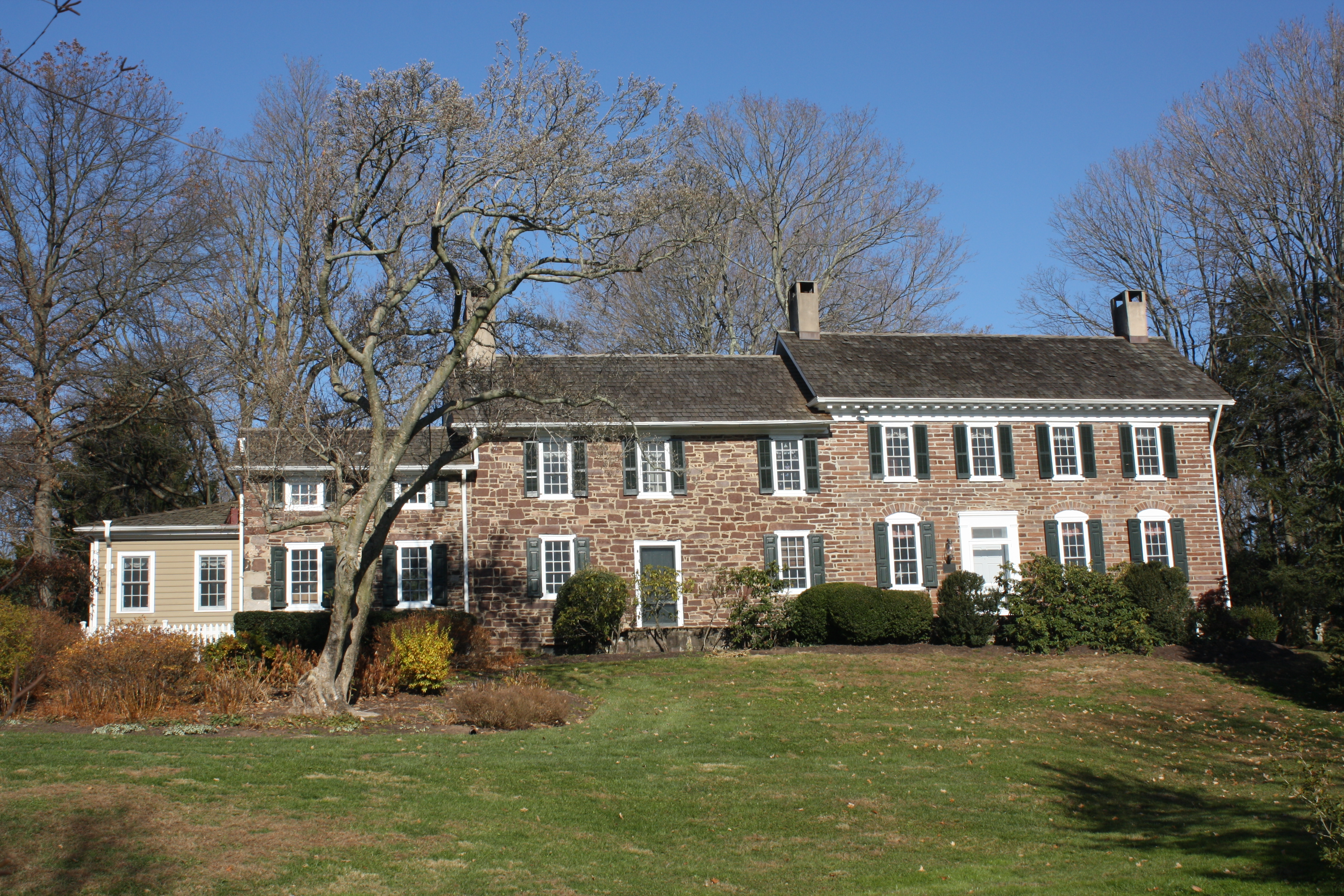
- John Burroughs Homestead. November 2012.

- Location within Pennsylvania Location within the United States
- Location: Wrightstown-Taylorsville Road, Taylorsville, Pennsylvania
- Coordinates: 40°17′04″N 74°54′02″W
- Area: 10 acres (4.0 ha)
- NRHP reference No.: 84003163
- Added to NRHP: March 5, 1984

The John Burroughs Homestead, also known as Shady Hill and the Lieutenant Colonel James Hendricks Headquarters, is an historic home that is located in Taylorsville, Upper Makefield Township, Bucks County, Pennsylvania, United States.

It was added to the National Register of Historic Places in 1984.

== History and architectural features ==
This historic house dates to the eighteenth century and was built in four sections. The oldest section is a 2 1/2-story, uncoursed fieldstone structure. The second section is a 2 1/2-story, coursed fieldstone structure. The third section is a two-story, random-coursed fieldstone structure, and the fourth section is a small, one-story frame vestibule. Also located on the property are a contributing 2 1/2-story, fieldstone carriage house, tool shed, and a stone-and-frame caretaker's cottage.
