= Makefield Meeting =

Historic church in Pennsylvania, United States

- U.S. National Register of Historic Places
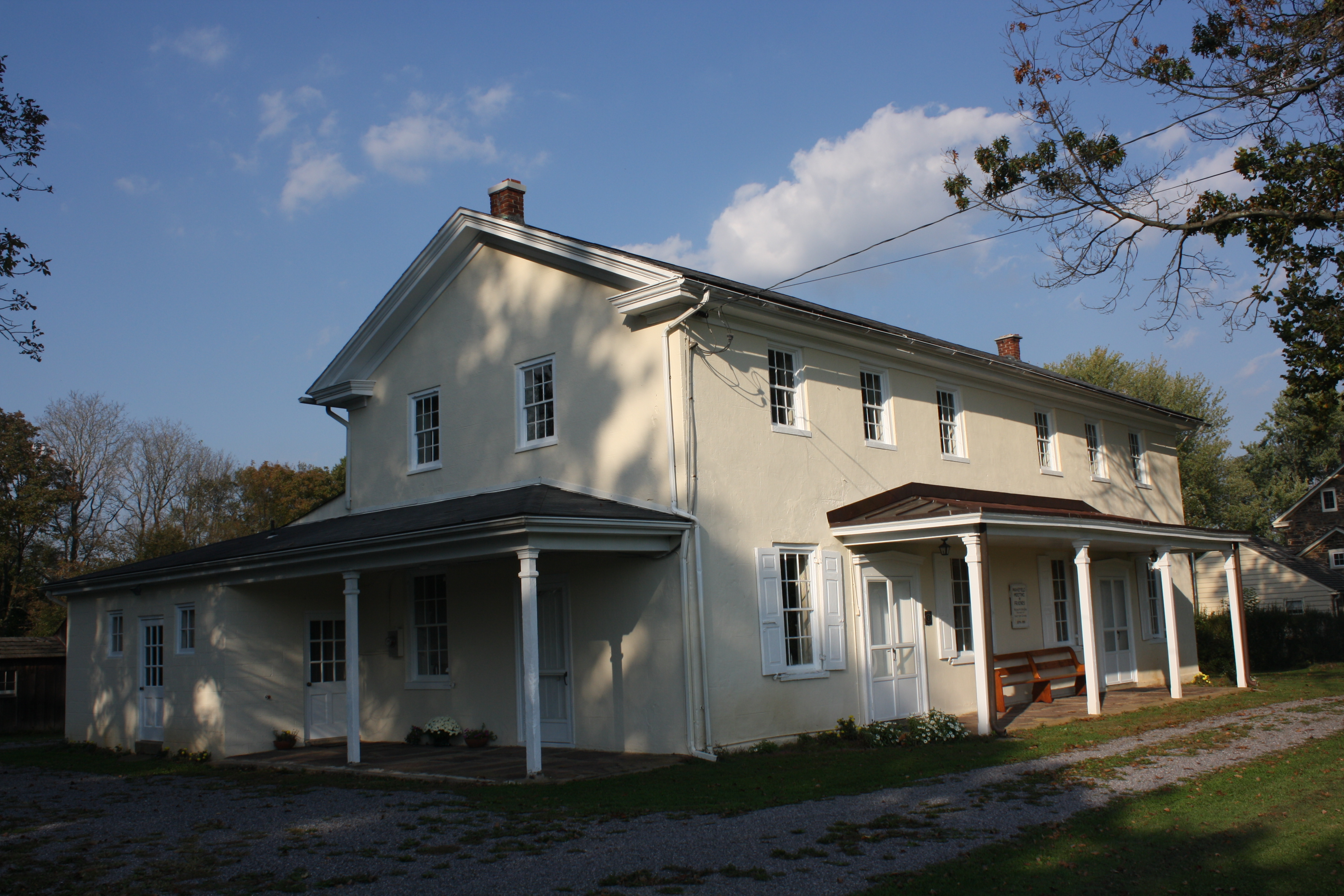
- Makefield Meeting. October 2012.

- Location within Pennsylvania Location within the United States
- Location: Northeast of Newtown at Mt. Eyre Road and Dolington Road, Upper Makefield Township, Pennsylvania
- Coordinates: 40°15′57″N 74°53′14″W
- Area: 1.2 acres (0.49 ha)
- Built: 1752, 1764
- NRHP reference No.: 74001758
- Added to NRHP: January 18, 1974

Makefield Meeting, also known as the Makefield Monthly Meeting; Meeting House at Dolington, is an historic Quaker meeting house complex in Upper Makefield Township, Pennsylvania, United States.

It was added to the National Register of Historic Places in 1974. It is active, with services held on Sundays.

== History and notable features ==
Built in 1752, this historic structure is a two-story, six-bay, stuccoed, stone structure with a gable roof. Its second story was added in 1764; the building was renovated in 1851. The complex also includes the 2 1/2-story, stuccoed, stone schoolmaster's house that was built in 1787, and a horse shed that was built circa 1800.
