= Old Eagle Tavern =

- U.S. National Register of Historic Places
- U.S. Historic district – Contributing property
- New Jersey Register of Historic Places
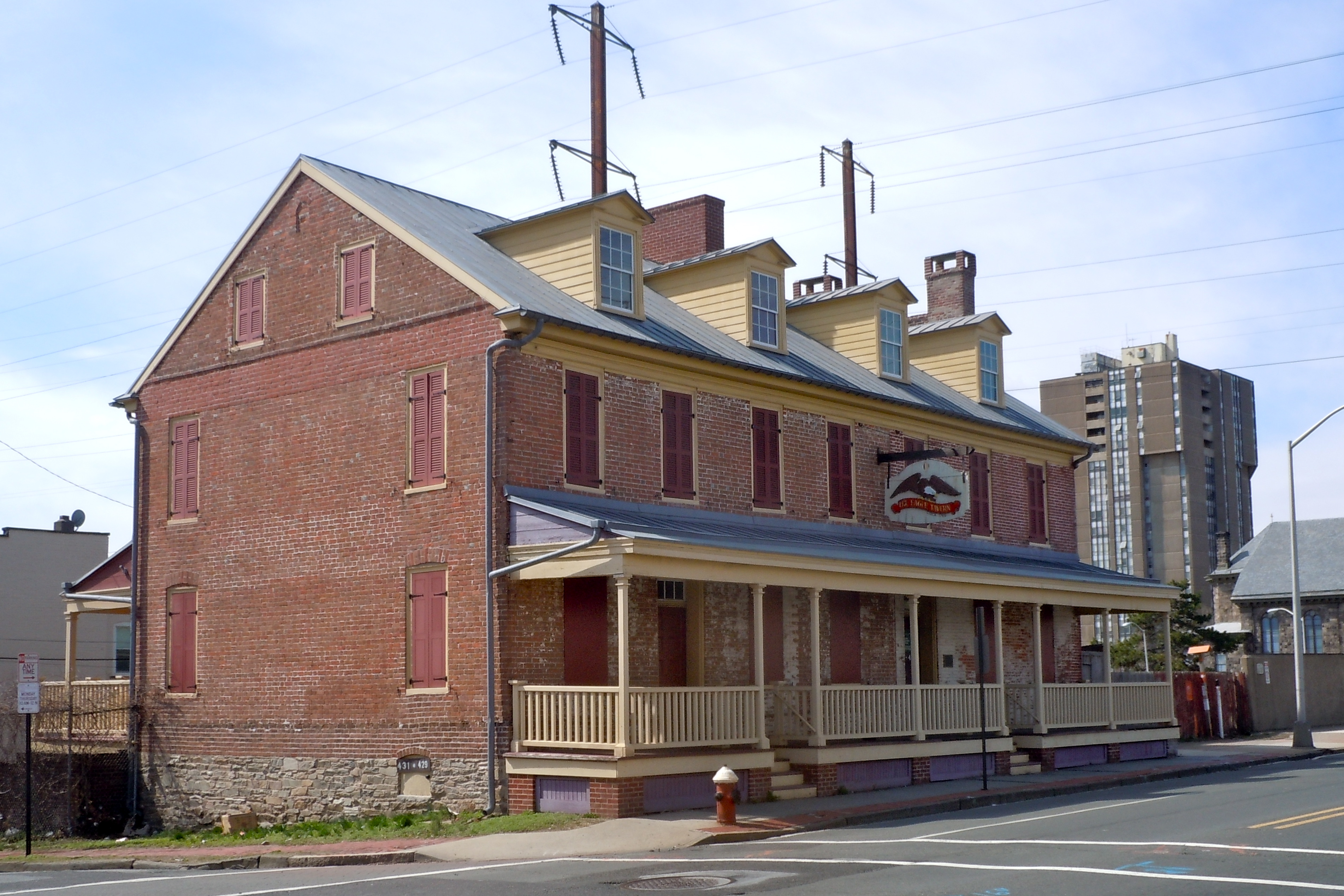

- Location within Mercer County, New Jersey Location within New Jersey Location within the United States
- Location: 431, 433 South Broad Street, corner of Ferry Street; Trenton, New Jersey
- Coordinates: 40°12′47″N 74°45′34″W
- Area: 0.1 acres (0.040 ha)
- Built: 1765
- Part of: Trenton Ferry Historic District (ID13000355)
- NRHP reference No.: 72000801
- NJRHP No.: 1786

Significant dates
- Added to NRHP: November 3, 1972
- Designated NJRHP: January 14, 1972

The Old Eagle Tavern (historically known as the Eagle Tavern) is a historic building located at 431, 433 South Broad Street at the corner of Ferry Street in Trenton, Mercer County, New Jersey. The building was built in 1765 by Robert Waln. The building operated as a tavern and hotel from 1765 to 1896. It was added to the National Register of Historic Places on November 3, 1972 for its architectural, commercial, and political significance. The building is also a contributing property of the Trenton Ferry Historic District, which was listed on June 26, 2013.

== See also ==
- National Register of Historic Places listings in Mercer County, New Jersey
