= Houghs Creek (Delaware River tributary) =

- Houghs Creek

Location
- Country: United States
- State: Pennsylvania
- County: Bucks
- Township: Upper Makefield

Physical characteristics
- Source
  - coordinates: 40°16′19″N 74°57′17″W
  - elevation: 320 feet (98 m)
- Mouth: Delaware River
  - coordinates: 40°19′39″N 74°51′32″W
  - elevation: 26 feet (7.9 m)
- Length: 4.70 miles (7.56 km)
- Basin size: 5.19 square miles (13.4 km^{2})

Basin features
- River system: Delaware River
- Bridges: Woodland Road; Creamery Road; Highland Road; Old Dolington Road; Pennsylvania Route 532 (Washington Crossing Road); Taylorsville Road; Delaware Canal; Pennsylvania Route 32 (River Road)
- Slope: 62.55 feet per mile (11.847 m/km)

Houghs Creek, also spelled Hough's Creek, is a tributary of the Delaware River in Bucks County, Pennsylvania, contained wholly within Upper Makefield Township.

== History ==
Houghs Creek is named for the first settler on the creek, Richard Hough. It is shown on the Homes map of 1682-1684 as flowing through the Hough tract, but his name was spelled as 'Richard Huffe'.

== Statistics ==
Houghs Creek was added to the Geographic Names Information System database of the U.S. Geological Survey as identification number 1192637 on 2 August 1979. The Pennsylvania Gazetteer of Stream identifies Houghs Creek as number 02958.

== Course ==
Houghs Creek is the most southerly stream in Upper Makefield Township, beginning from the southwest side of the township at an elevation of 320 feet (98 m), it flows generally eastward, receiving three unnamed tributaries from the right bank before reaching its confluence at the Delaware's 140.60 river mile at an elevation of 26 feet (7.9 m), resulting in an average slope of 62.55 feet per mile (11.847 m/km)., about 1.3 miles (2.1 km) below Washington Crossing, Pennsylvania.

== Municipalities ==
- Bucks County
  - Upper Makefield Township

== Crossings and bridges ==
Crossing	NBI Number	Length	Lanes	Spans	Material/Design	Built	Reconstructed	Latitude	Longitude
Woodland Road	-	-	-	-	-	-	-	-	-
Creamery Road	-	-	-	-	-	-	-	-	-
Highland Road	-	-	-	-	-	-	-	-	-
Old Dolington Road	7647	7 metres (23 ft)	1	1	steel stringer/multi-beam or girder	1940	1985	40°16'55.8"N	74°53'52.1"W
Pennsylvania Route 532 (Washington Crossing Road)	7051	13 metres (43 ft)	2	1	continuous concrete stringer/multi-beam or girder	1910	1928	40°17'2.7"N	74°52'55.78"W
Taylorsville Road	7318	12 metres (39 ft)	2	1	concrete tee beam	1941	-	40°16'52.6"N	74°51'57.7"W
Delaware Canal aqueduct and towpath	-	-	-	-	-	-	-	-	-
Pennsylvania Route 32 (River Road)	6787	19 metres (62 ft)	2	1	concrete arch deck	1933	-	40°16'37.8"N	74°51'34"W

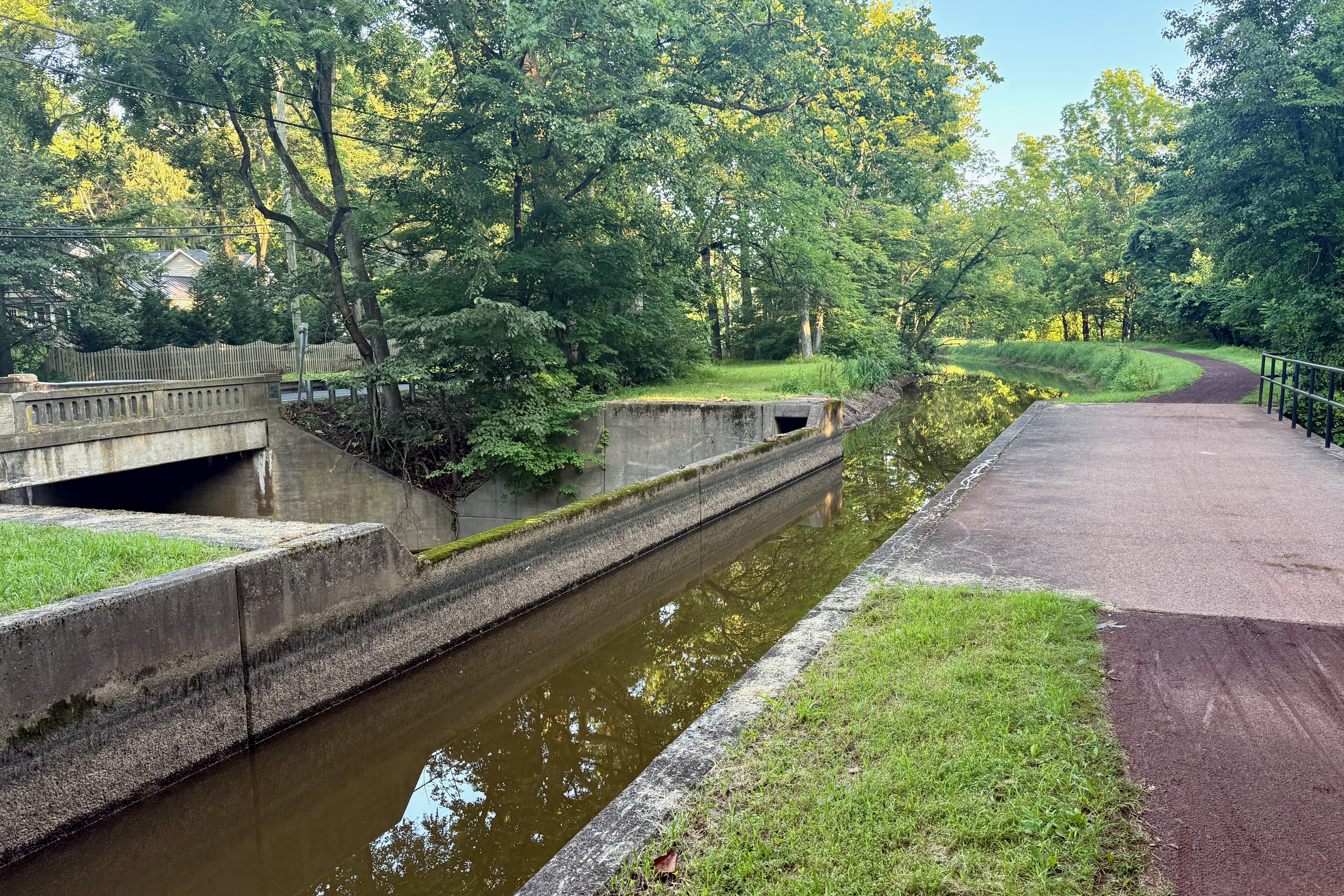
Taylorsville Road and Hough's Creek Aqueduct

== See also ==
- List of rivers of Pennsylvania
- List of rivers of the United States
- List of Delaware River tributaries
