= Brownsburg Village Historic District =

Historic district in Pennsylvania, United States

- U.S. National Register of Historic Places
- U.S. Historic district
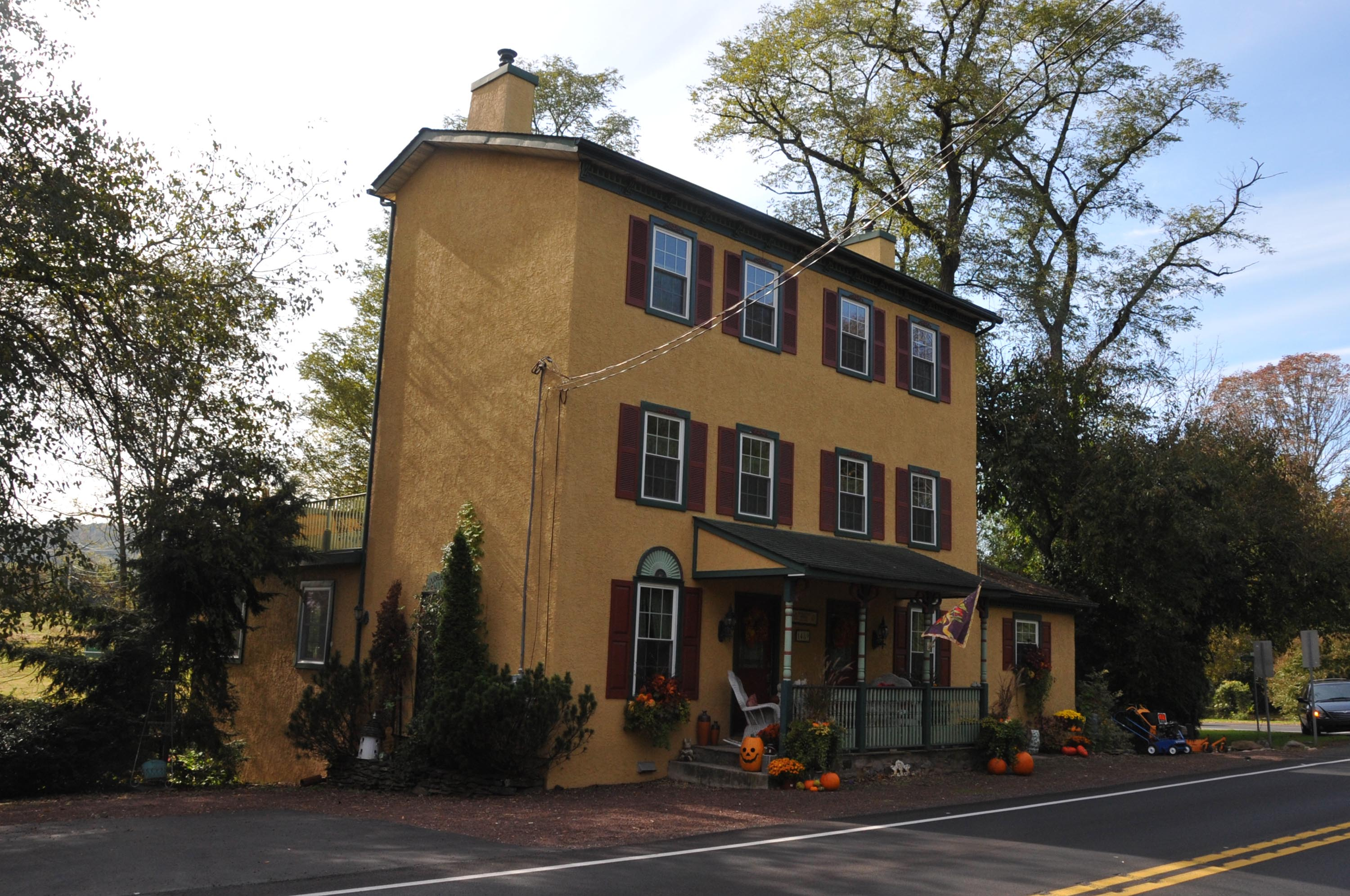
- Building in the Brownsburg Village Historic District, October 2012

- Location within Pennsylvania Location within the United States
- Location: Jct. of River and Brownsburg Rds., Upper Makefield Township, Brownsburg, Pennsylvania
- Coordinates: 40°19′10″N 74°55′12″W
- Area: 23 acres (9.3 ha)
- Architectural style: Italianate, Federal
- NRHP reference No.: 94000445
- Added to NRHP: May 26, 1994

Brownsburg Village Historic District is a national historic district located at Brownsburg, Upper Makefield Township, Bucks County, Pennsylvania. The district includes 37 contributing buildings, 1 contributing site, and 2 contributing structures in the village of Brownsburg. Most of the buildings were built between 1810 and 1840, and reflective of the Italianate and Federal styles. The oldest building is the Beaumont Tavern House and tenement. Other notable buildings are the Grace Johnson House, Gilbert Tenement, Andrew Jamison House, and Slack Bungalow (c. 1920). Also in the district are structures related to the site of the Delaware Division of the Pennsylvania Canal.

It was added to the National Register of Historic Places in 1994.
