= Buckmanville Historic District =

Historic district in Pennsylvania, United States

- U.S. National Register of Historic Places
- U.S. Historic district
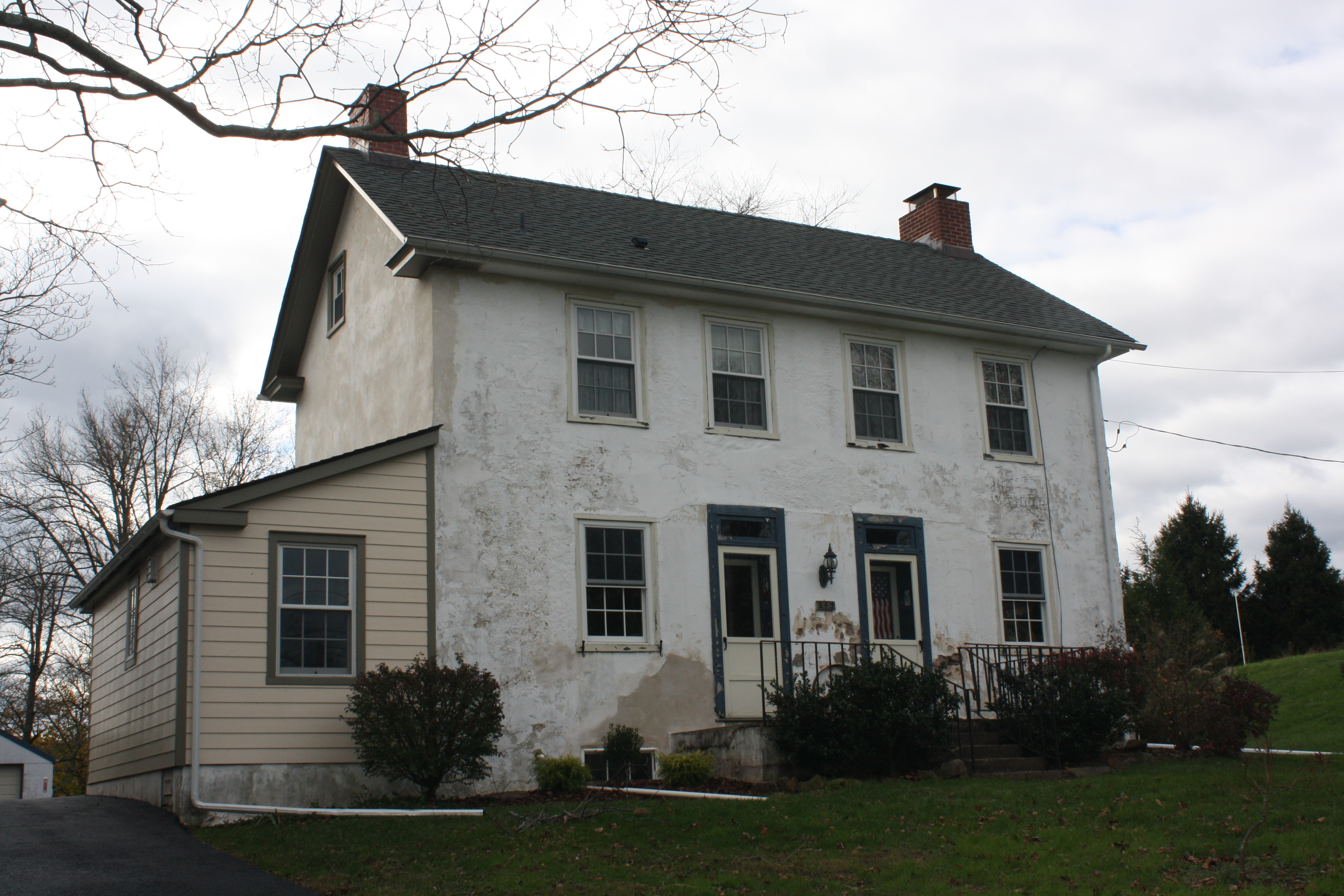
- Buckmanville Historic District, Street Rd. November 2012.

- Location within Pennsylvania Location within the United States
- Location: Street Rd. bet. Windy Bush and Buckmanville Rds., Upper Makefield Township, Pennsylvania
- Coordinates: 40°18′51″N 74°58′33″W
- Area: 30 acres (12 ha)
- Architectural style: Federal, Greek Revival
- NRHP reference No.: 02000224
- Added to NRHP: March 20, 2002

Buckmanville Historic District is a national historic district located at Buckmanville, Upper Makefield Township, Bucks County, Pennsylvania. The district includes 12 contributing buildings and 1 contributing structure in the village of Buckmanville. All of the buildings were built between 1820 and 1875, and reflective of the Greek Revival and Federal styles. Notable buildings are the William Atkinson / William Ellis House, Samuel Atkinson Farm, George Buckman House and Property, Silas L. Atkinson House, William Worthington / Lewis Worstall House, Barclay J. Smith / Alice Leedom House, and Barclay J. Smith Double House.

It was added to the National Register of Historic Places in 2002.

== Gallery ==
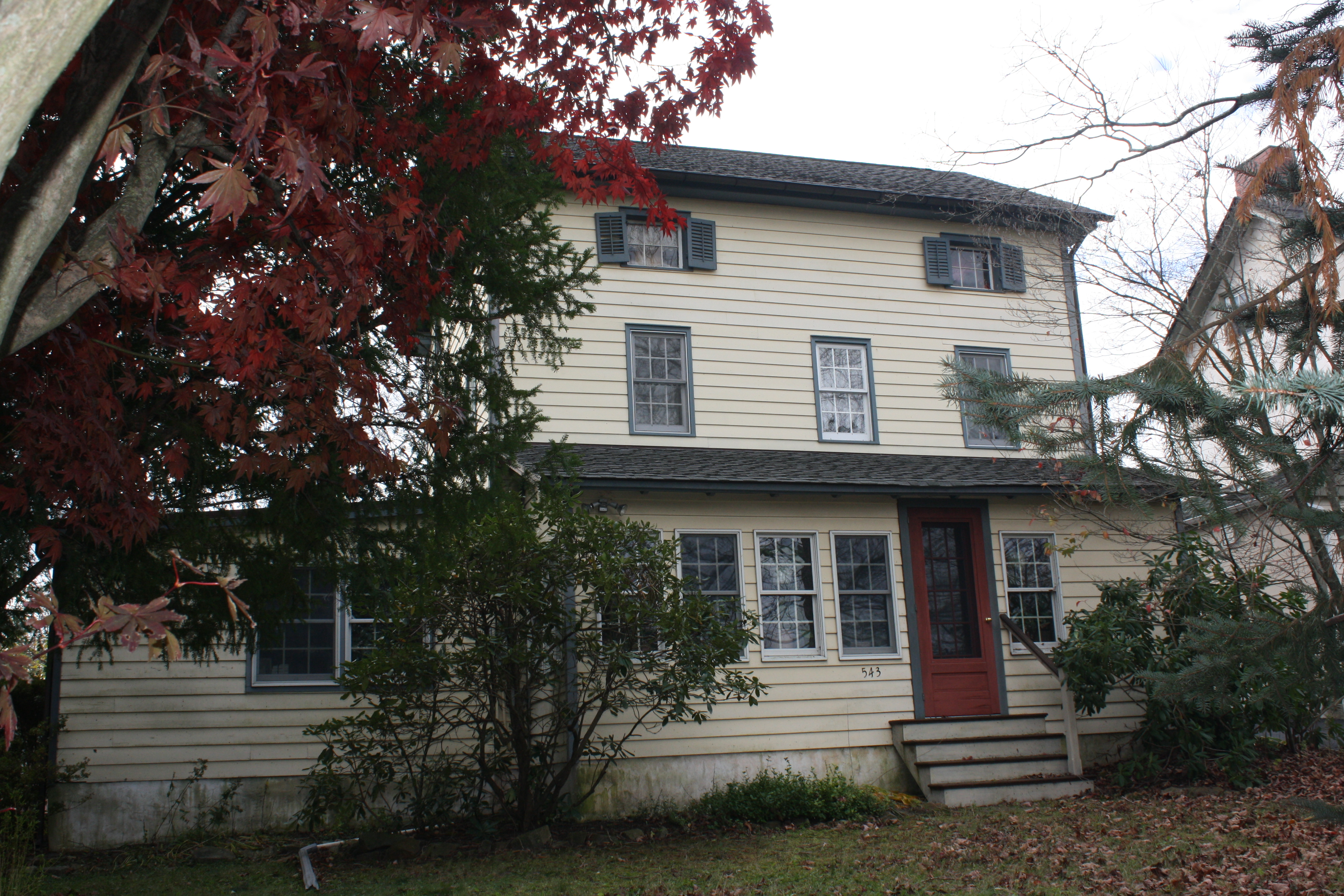

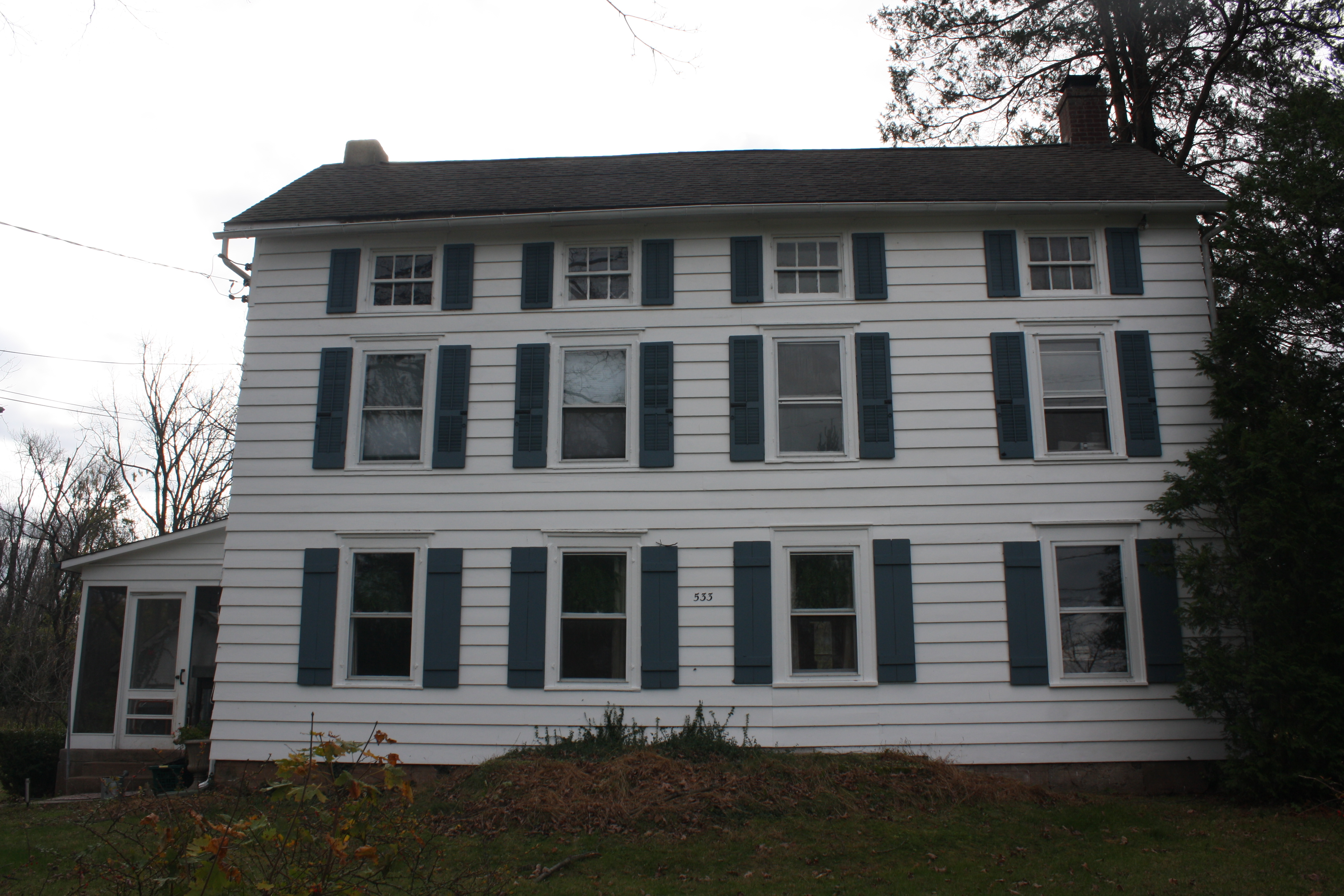

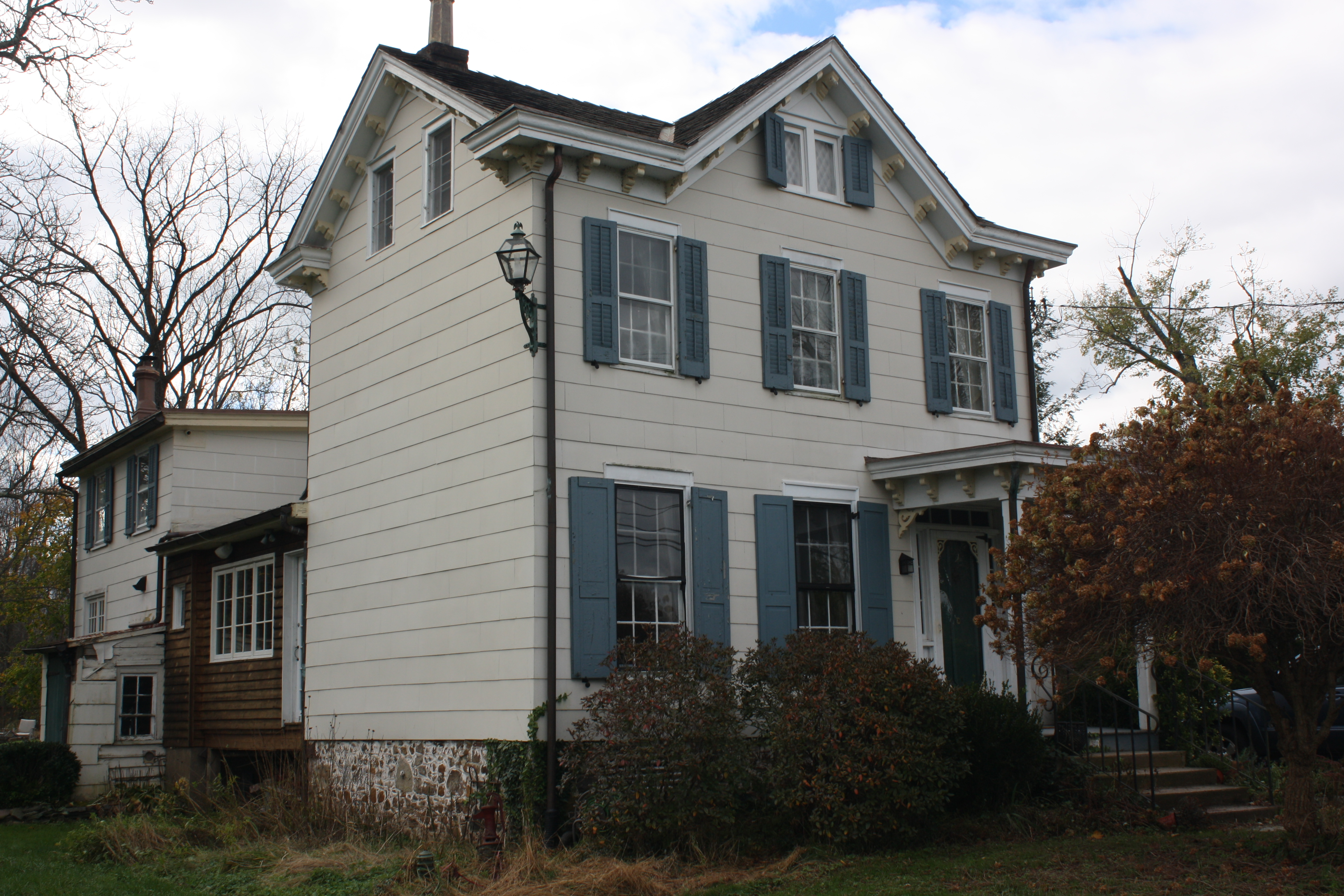

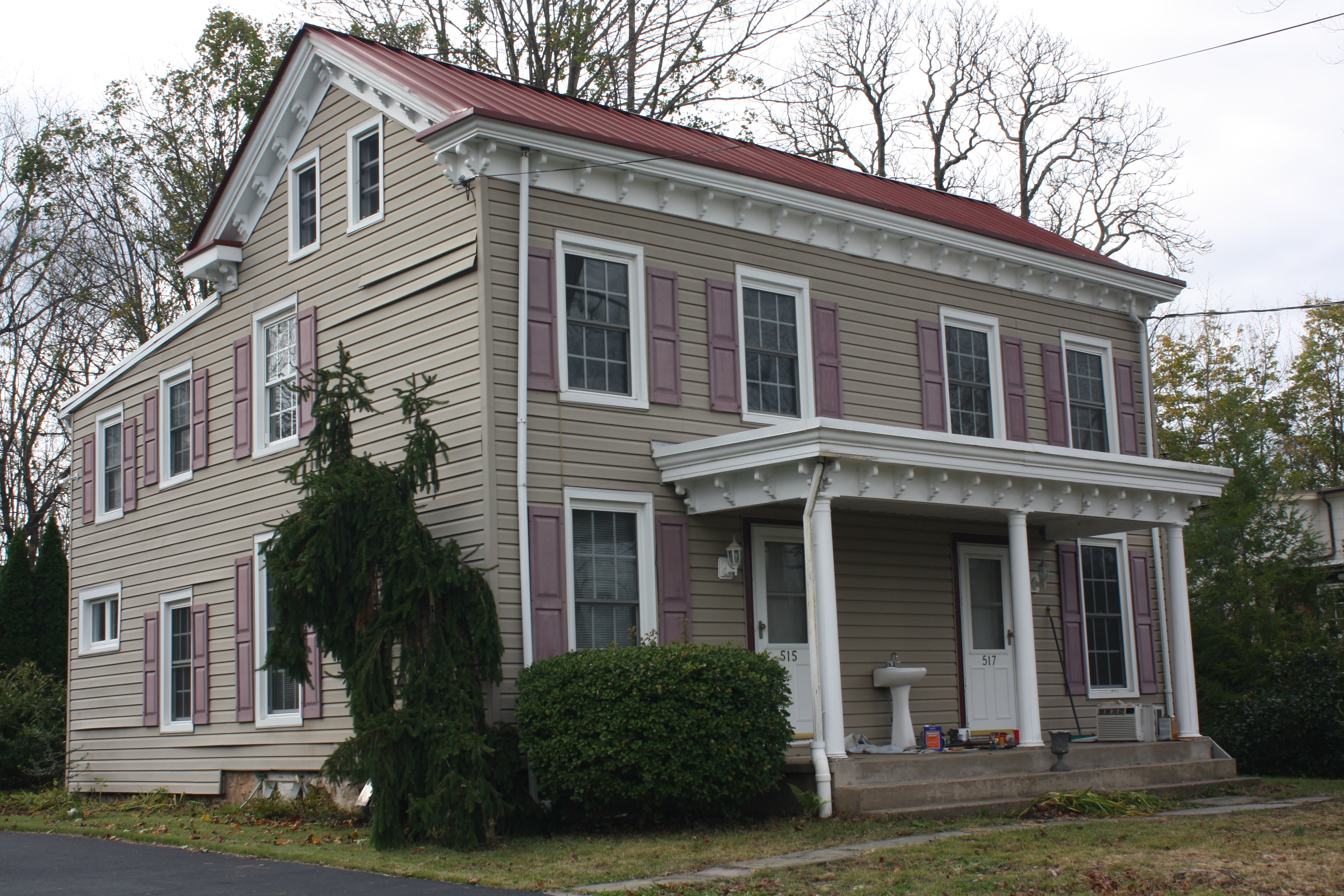
