= Keith House (Upper Makefield Township, Pennsylvania) =

Historic house in Pennsylvania, United States

- Keith House—Washington's Headquarters
- U.S. National Register of Historic Places
- Pennsylvania state historical marker
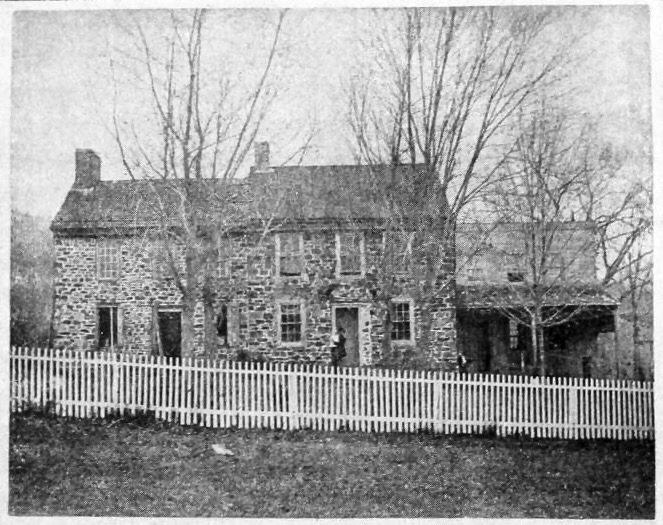
- Keith House, Washington's Headquarters, image from 1898

- Location within Pennsylvania
- Location: Pineville Road, Upper Makefield Township, Pennsylvania
- Coordinates: 40°17′44″N 74°56′49″W
- Area: 1 acre (0.40 ha)
- Built: c. 1742
- NRHP reference No.: 78002356

Significant dates
- Added to NRHP: November 14, 1978
- Designated PHMC: 1947

The Keith House, also known as Washington's Headquarters or Headquarters Farm, was a historic house in Upper Makefield Township, Bucks County in the U.S. state of Pennsylvania. It served as the headquarters for George Washington during the American Revolutionary War and was listed on the National Register of Historic Places in 1978.

== History ==
The 230 acres (93 ha) of land surrounding the Keith House was originally set aside by William Penn for use by his family, but sold it in 1697 to a group of investors after he found people already living on it. The house was likely constructed sometime around 1742, with the land being acquired through an auction by William Keith in 1761.

During the American Revolutionary War, the house was headquarters for General George Washington from December 14 to December 24, 1776. It was the location from which Washington planned the crossing of the Delaware River and subsequent Battle of Trenton. Legend has it that the Keith House's spring house was where double agent John Honeyman was imprisoned to inform Washington of the plans of the Hessian troops in Trenton.

The house was kept in Keith family for 133 years. After the death of John Slack Keith, the house was sold to John Paxon in 1893. The property was acquired and owned by Henry Bristol between 1933 and 1946. The house was then sold to James Rendall.

It was destroyed by fire in the 1980s and later rebuilt, but not included in Washington's Crossing, the National Historic Landmark.

== See also ==
- National Register of Historic Places listings in Bucks County, Pennsylvania
- List of Washington's Headquarters during the Revolutionary War
