= Upper Makefield Township, Pennsylvania =

Township in Pennsylvania, US

- Township
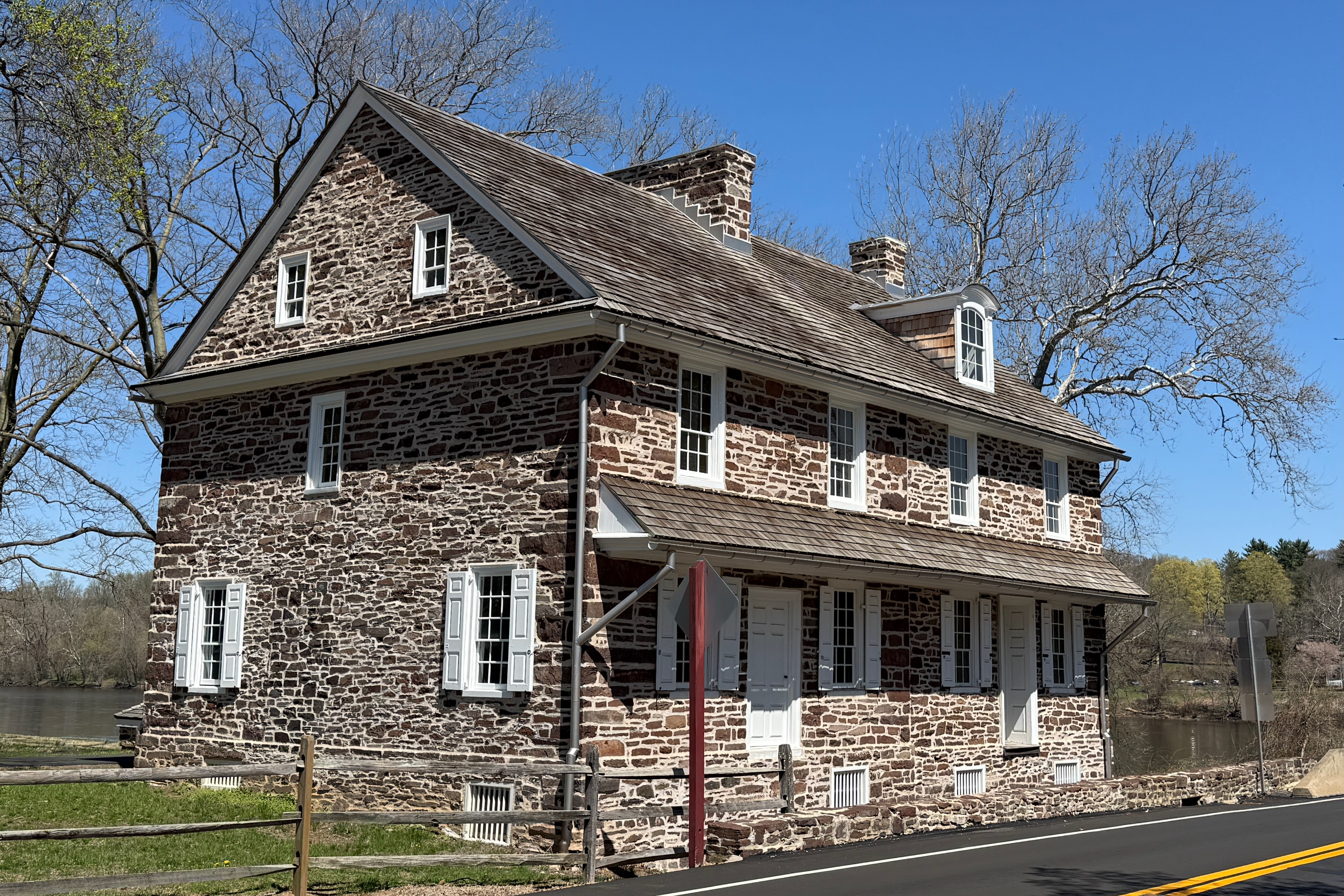
- McConkey's Ferry Inn at Washington Crossing Historic Park

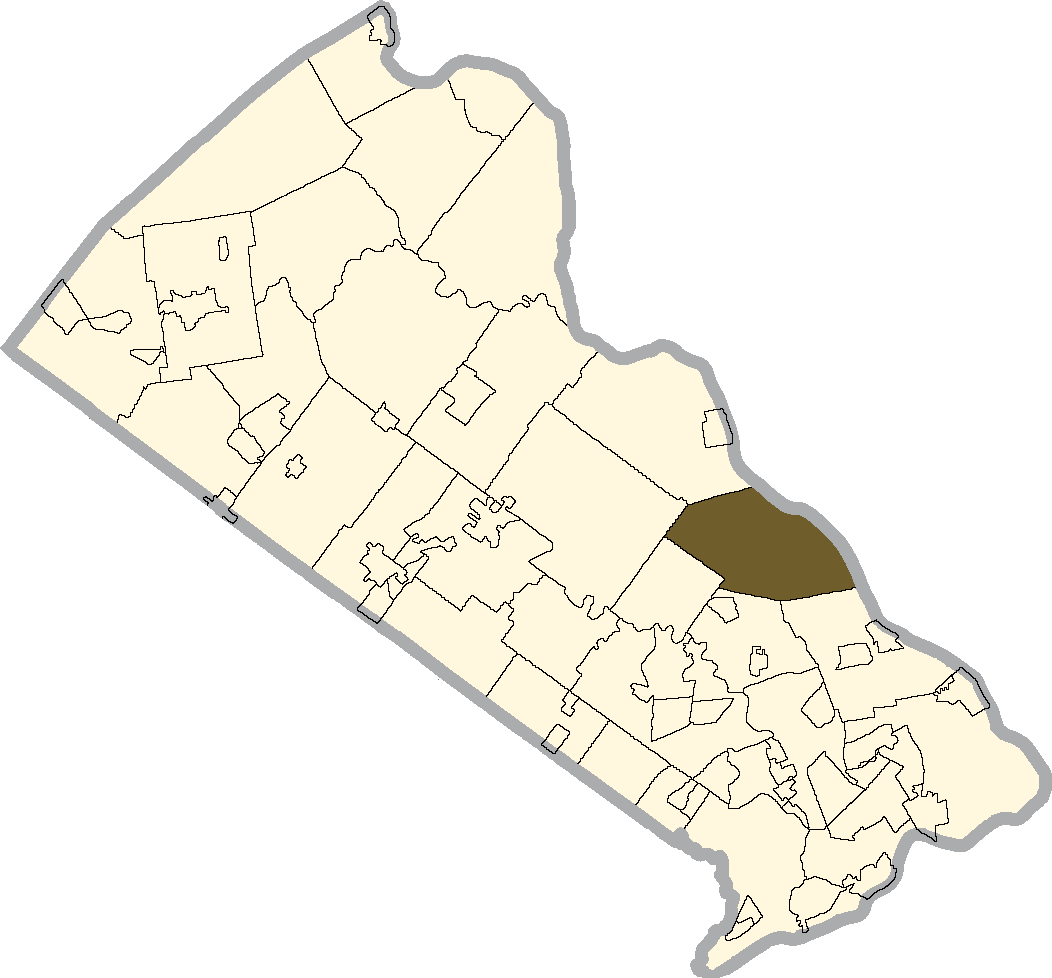
- Location of Upper Makefield Township in Bucks County, Pennsylvania

- Location within Pennsylvania Location within the United States
- Coordinates: 40°17′31″N 74°55′27″W
- Country: United States
- State: Pennsylvania
- County: Bucks

Area
  - Total: 21.80 sq mi (56.5 km^{2})
  - Land: 21.25 sq mi (55.0 km^{2})
  - Water: 0.55 sq mi (1.4 km^{2})
- Elevation: 161 ft (49 m)

Population (2010)
  - Total: 8,190
  - Estimate (2016): 8,392
  - Density: 385/sq mi (149/km^{2})
- Time zone: UTC-5 (EST)
  - Summer (DST): UTC-4 (EDT)
- Area codes: 215, 267, 445
- FIPS code: 42-017-79128
- Website: www.uppermakefield.org

Upper Makefield Township is a township in Bucks County, Pennsylvania. Upper Makefield is located in the Philadelphia metropolitan area. The population was 8,857 at the 2020 census. It has the eighth-highest per capita income among all townships in Pennsylvania.

Upper Makefield Township's multimillion-dollar homes, highly-ranked public schools, and relatively easy commute to New York City and Princeton led to its 2006 ranking as "Best Place to Live in the Suburbs" in Philadelphia magazine.

The township is the Philadelphia area's second-most expensive suburb and the 287th-wealthiest neighborhood in the nation with a mean household income of $306,081. The area has also been listed an alternative to The Hamptons for the summer by New York magazine.

== History ==
George Washington and the Continental Army crossed the Delaware River here the night of December 25–26, 1776, during the American Revolutionary War, leading to the victory at the Battle of Trenton on the morning of December 26. Prior to the crossing, Washington had his headquarters at the Keith House, Nathanael Greene at the Samuel Merrick House, Henry Knox and Alexander Hamilton at the John Chapman House, John Sullivan at the John Hayhurst House and William Alexander, Lord Stirling at the Thompson-Neely House.

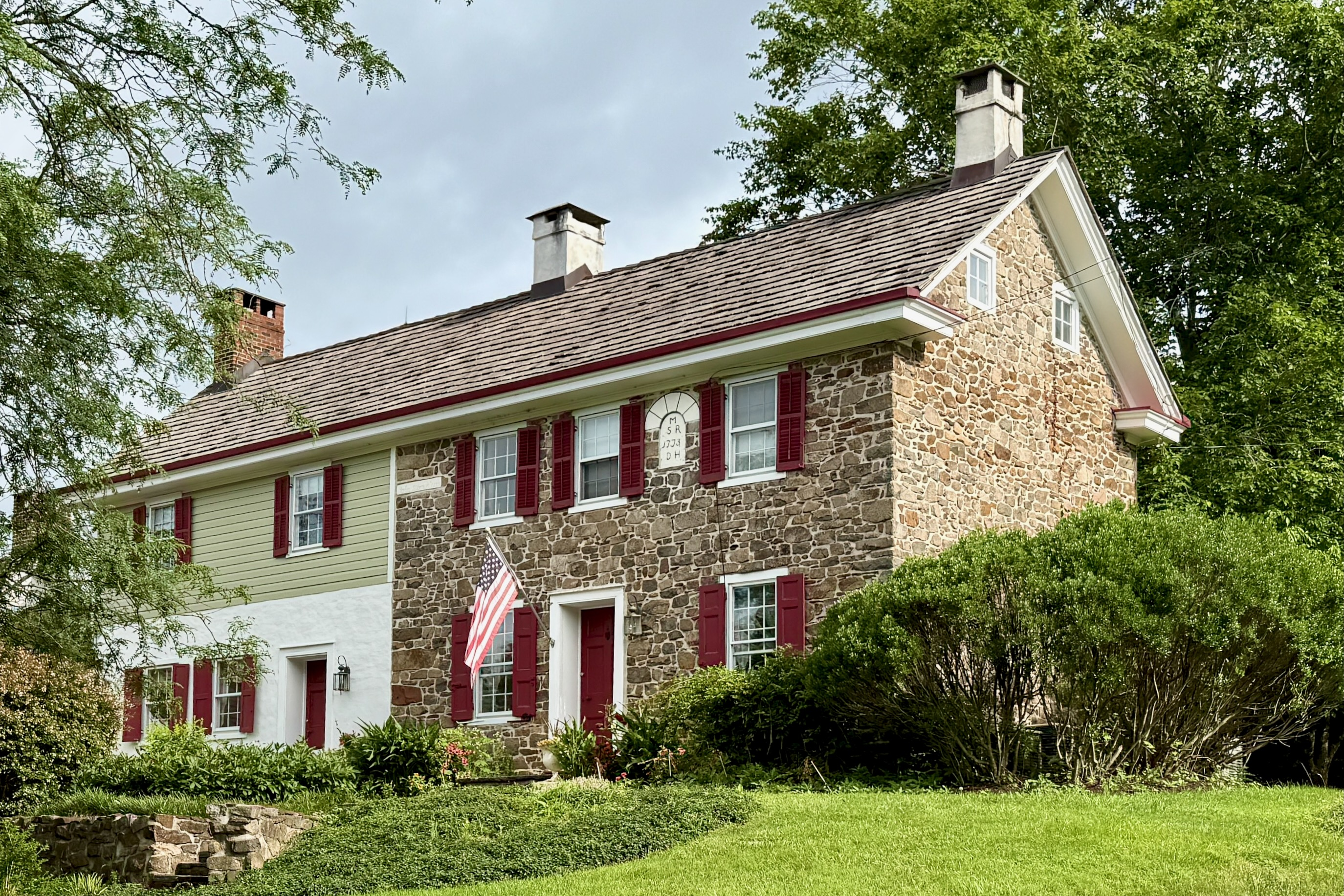
Samuel Merrick House, Greene's Headquarters

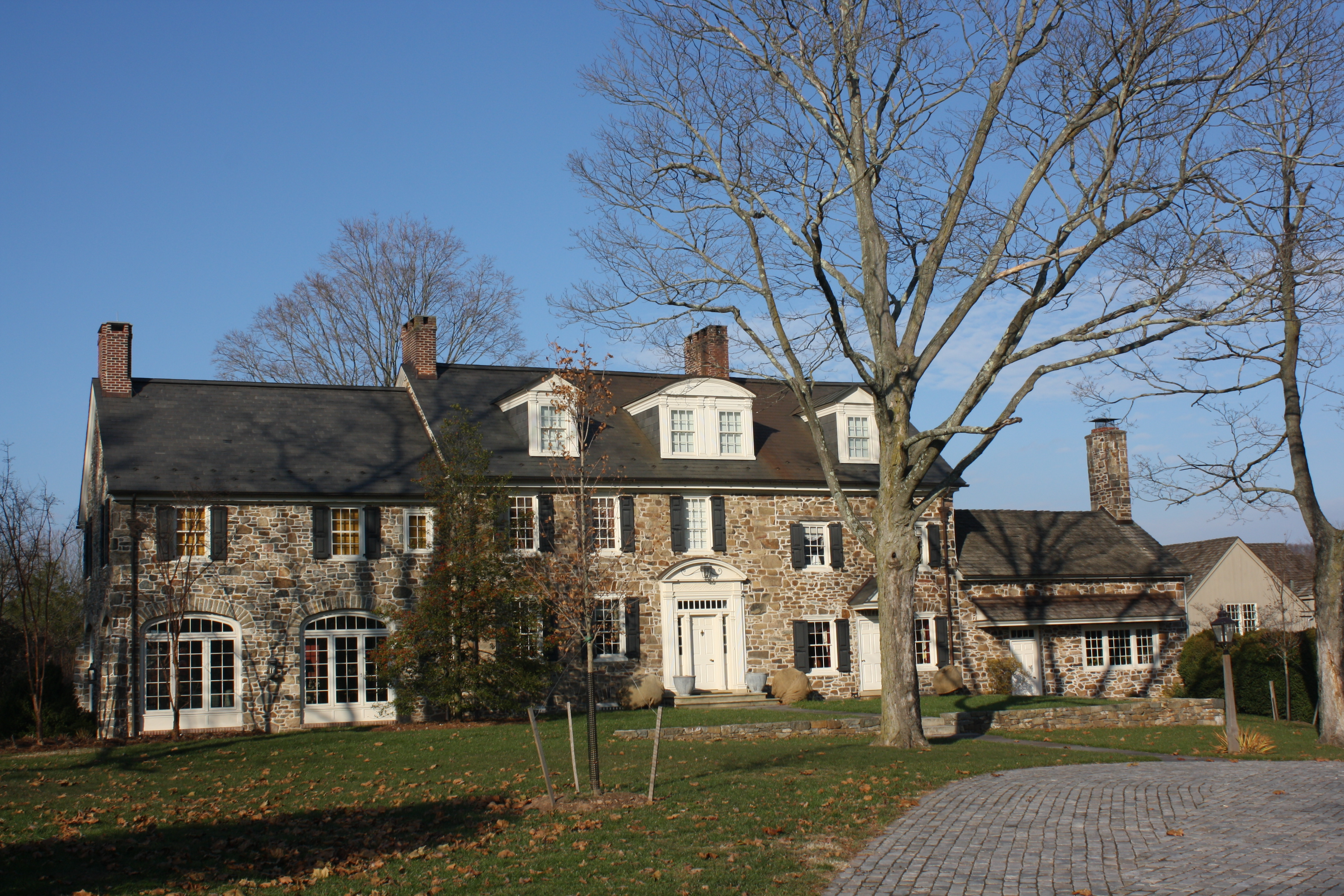
John Chapman House, Knox's Headquarters

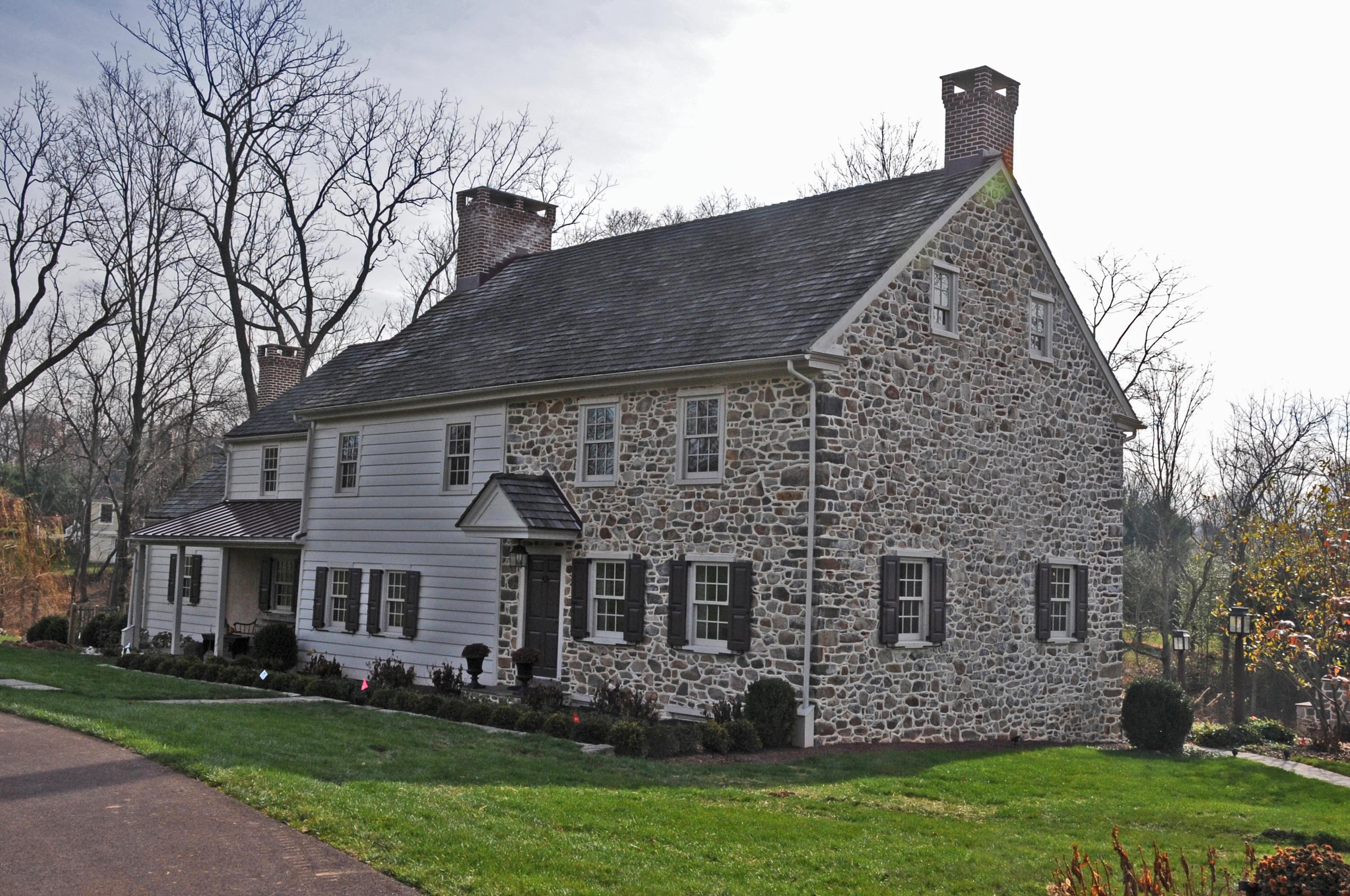
John Hayhurst House, Sullivan's Headquarters

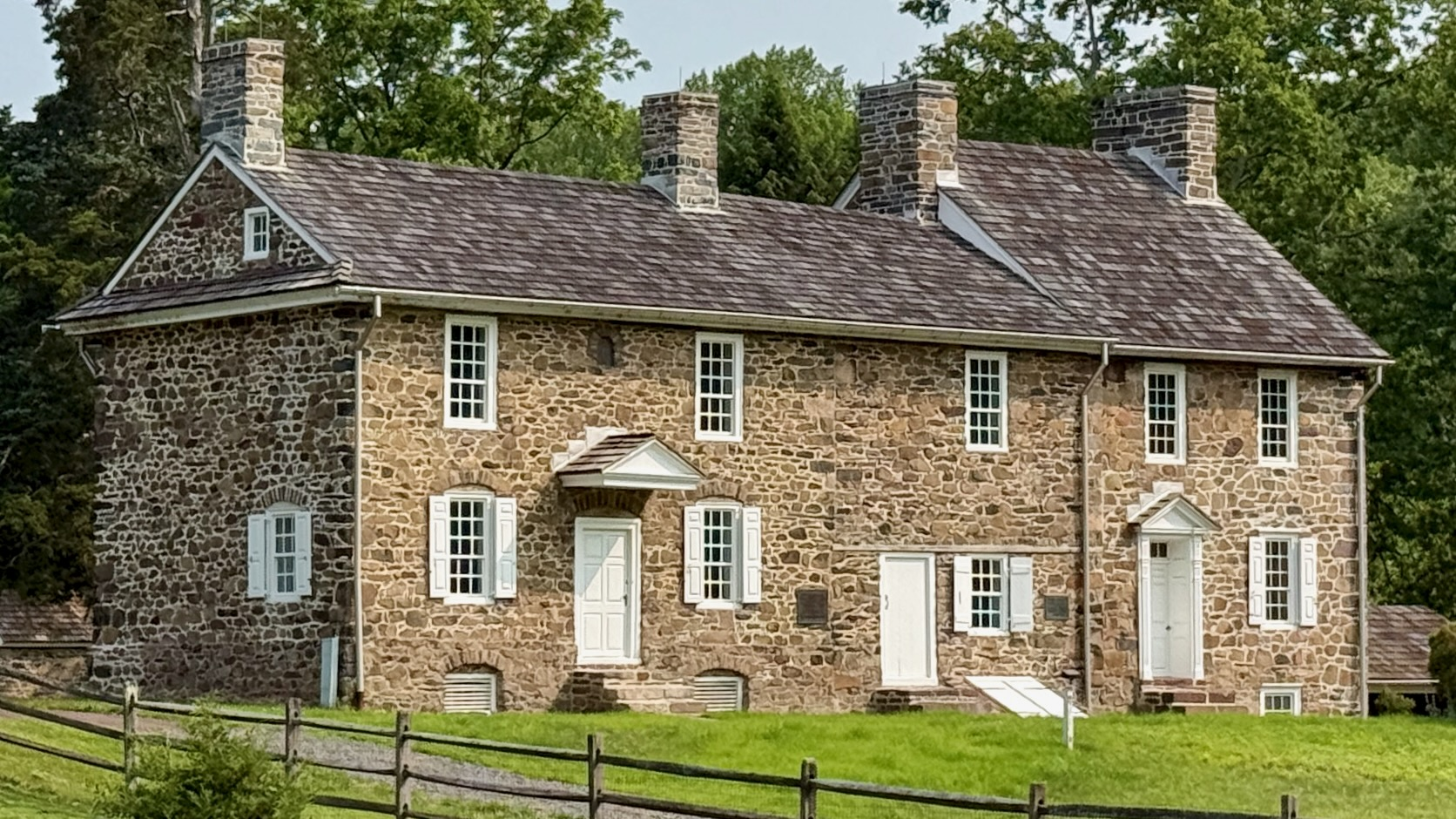
Thompson-Neely House, Lord Stirling's Headquarters

The Brownsburg Village Historic District, Buckmanville Historic District, John Burroughs Homestead, Dolington Village Historic District, John Chapman House, Eagle Tavern, Hayhurst Farm, Keith House, Makefield Meeting and Smith Family Farmstead are listed on the National Register of Historic Places.

== Geography ==
According to the U.S. Census Bureau, the township has a total area of 21.5 square miles (55.8 km^{2}), 20.9 square miles (54.2 km^{2}) of which is land and 0.6 square mile (1.6 km^{2}) (2.88%) of which is water.

Past and present place names in Upper Makefield include Buckmanville, Dolington, Jericho, Lizette, Lurgan, Washington Crossing, and Woodhill.

Natural features include Houghs Creek, Jericho Mountain, Pidcock Creek and Bowman's Hill.

== Demographics ==
Historical population
Census	Pop.	Note	%±
1880	1,470		—
1890	1,236		−15.9%
1900	1,143		−7.5%
1910	1,091		−4.5%
1920	1,013		−7.1%
1930	951		−6.1%
1940	950		−0.1%
1950	1,410		48.4%
1960	1,991		41.2%
1970	2,905		45.9%
1980	4,577		57.6%
1990	5,949		30.0%
2000	7,180		20.7%
2010	8,190		14.1%
2020	8,857		8.1%

As of the 2010 census, the township was 93.0% Non-Hispanic White, 1.1% Black or African American, 0.2% Native American, 2.5% Asian, and 1.0% were two or more races. 2.3% of the population were of Hispanic or Latino ancestry.

As of the census of 2000, there were 7,180 people, 2,512 households, and 2,105 families residing in the township. The population density was 343.1 inhabitants per square mile (132.5/km^{2}). There were 2,598 housing units at an average density of 124.1 per square mile (47.9/km^{2}). The racial makeup of the township was 97.12% White, 0.81% African American, 0.07% Native American, 1.27% Asian, 0.24% from other races, and 0.50% from two or more races. Hispanic or Latino of any race were 1.13% of the population.

There were 2,512 households, out of which 37.9% had children under the age of 18 living with them, 77.3% were married couples living together, 4.6% had a female householder with no husband present, and 16.2% were non-families. 12.3% of all households were made up of individuals, and 3.6% had someone living alone who was 65 years of age or older. The average household size was 2.86 and the average family size was 3.13.

In the township the population was spread out, with 26.7% under the age of 18, 5.1% from 18 to 24, 23.3% from 25 to 44, 34.7% from 45 to 64, and 10.2% who were 65 years of age or older. The median age was 42 years. For every 100 females, there were 96.7 males. For every 100 females age 18 and over, there were 99.6 males.

The median income for a household in the township was $102,759, and the median income for a family was $114,064. Males had a median income of $90,000 versus $42,365 for females. The per capita income for the township was $56,288. About 1.6% of families and 2.1% of the population were below the poverty line, including none of those under age 18 and 1.5% of those age 65 or over.

== Climate ==
According to the Köppen climate classification system, Upper Makefield Township, Pennsylvania has a hot-summer, wet all year, humid continental climate (Dfa). Dfa climates are characterized by at least one month having an average mean temperature ≤ 32.0 °F (≤ 0.0 °C), at least four months with an average mean temperature ≥ 50.0 °F (≥ 10.0 °C), at least one month with an average mean temperature ≥ 71.6 °F (≥ 22.0 °C), and no significant precipitation difference between seasons. During the summer months, episodes of extreme heat and humidity can occur with heat index values ≥ 100 °F (≥ 38 °C). On average, the wettest month of the year is July which corresponds with the annual peak in thunderstorm activity. During the winter months, episodes of extreme cold and wind can occur with wind chill values < 0 °F (< -18 °C). The plant hardiness zone is 6b with an average annual extreme minimum air temperature of -0.2 °F (-17.9 °C). The average seasonal (Nov-Apr) snowfall total is between 24 and 30 inches (61 and 76 cm), and the average snowiest month is February which corresponds with the annual peak in nor'easter activity.

Climate data for Upper Makefield Township, Bucks County, Pennsylvania (1981 – 2010 averages)
Month	Jan	Feb	Mar	Apr	May	Jun	Jul	Aug	Sep	Oct	Nov	Dec	Year
Mean daily maximum °F (°C)	39.7 (4.3)	43.0 (6.1)	51.2 (10.7)	63.2 (17.3)	73.0 (22.8)	82.1 (27.8)	86.4 (30.2)	84.6 (29.2)	77.7 (25.4)	66.3 (19.1)	55.3 (12.9)	44.1 (6.7)	64.0 (17.8)
Daily mean °F (°C)	31.4 (−0.3)	34.1 (1.2)	41.5 (5.3)	52.2 (11.2)	61.8 (16.6)	71.3 (21.8)	75.9 (24.4)	74.3 (23.5)	67.1 (19.5)	55.4 (13.0)	45.8 (7.7)	36.0 (2.2)	54.0 (12.2)
Mean daily minimum °F (°C)	23.1 (−4.9)	25.2 (−3.8)	31.8 (−0.1)	41.3 (5.2)	50.6 (10.3)	60.5 (15.8)	65.5 (18.6)	64.0 (17.8)	56.5 (13.6)	44.5 (6.9)	36.3 (2.4)	27.9 (−2.3)	44.0 (6.7)
Average precipitation inches (mm)	3.51 (89)	2.77 (70)	4.14 (105)	4.01 (102)	4.28 (109)	4.40 (112)	5.20 (132)	4.20 (107)	4.41 (112)	3.89 (99)	3.68 (93)	4.10 (104)	48.59 (1,234)
Average relative humidity (%)	65.6	62.2	58.0	57.4	61.9	66.1	66.2	68.8	69.8	69.0	67.4	67.3	65.0
Average dew point °F (°C)	21.2 (−6.0)	22.5 (−5.3)	27.8 (−2.3)	37.6 (3.1)	48.6 (9.2)	59.4 (15.2)	63.8 (17.7)	63.4 (17.4)	56.9 (13.8)	45.4 (7.4)	35.6 (2.0)	26.2 (−3.2)	42.5 (5.8)
Source: PRISM Climate Group

== Transportation ==
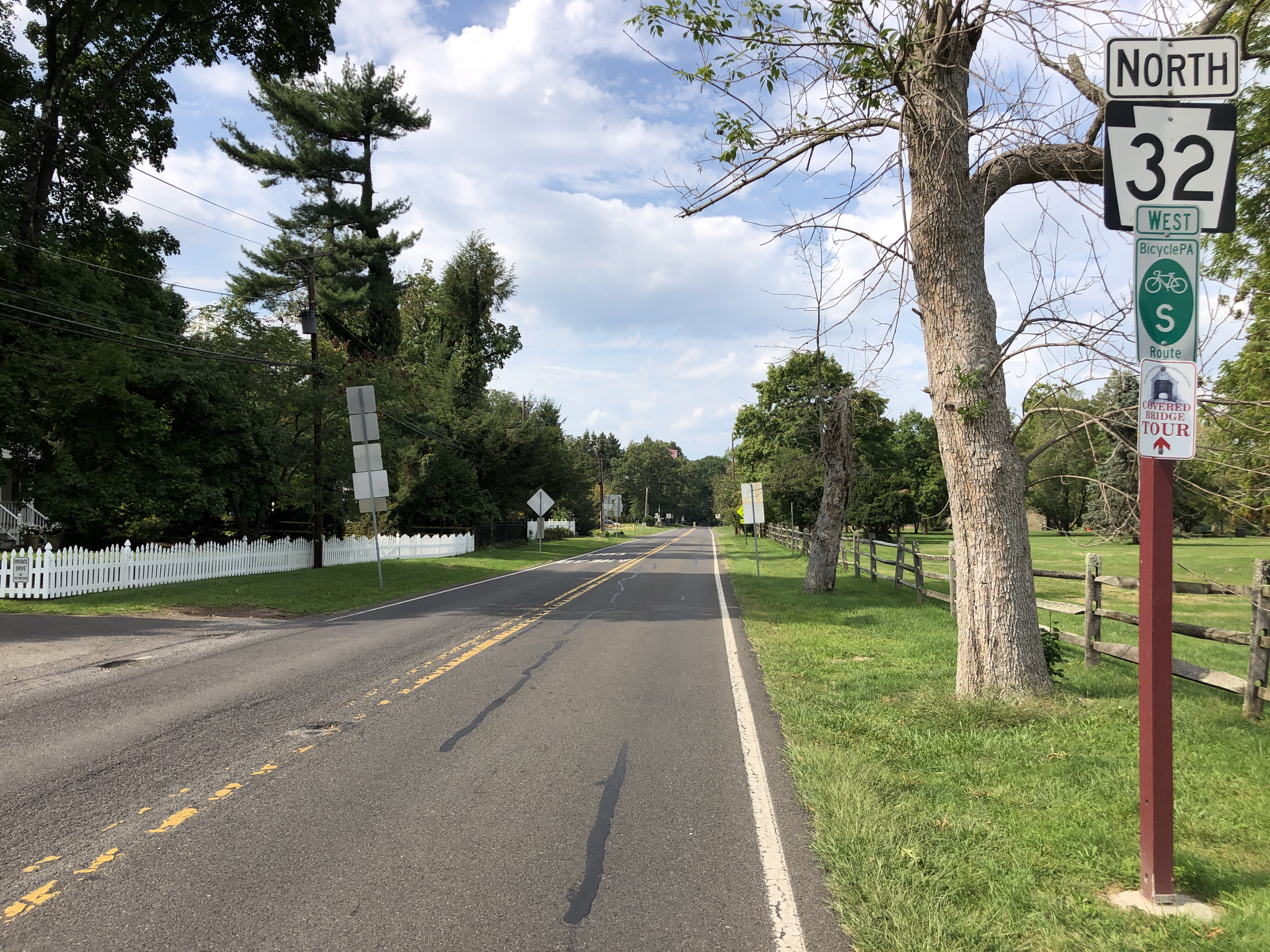
PA 32 northbound past PA 532 in Upper Makefield Township

As of 2018 there were 84.76 miles (136.41 km) of public roads in Upper Makefield Township, of which 30.88 miles (49.70 km) were maintained by the Pennsylvania Department of Transportation (PennDOT) and 53.88 miles (86.71 km) were maintained by the township.

Numbered highways serving Upper Makefield Township include Pennsylvania Route 32, Pennsylvania Route 232 and Pennsylvania Route 532. PA 32 follows River Road along a northwest-southeast alignment across the northeastern portion of the township, parallel to the Delaware River. PA 232 utilizes Windy Bush Road as it crosses the northwestern part of the township on a northeast-southwest alignment. Finally, PA 532 follows Washington Crossing Road on a southwest-northeast alignment across the southeastern portion of the township, reaching its northern terminus at PA 32 just shy of the Washington Crossing Bridge.

== Ecology ==
According to the A. W. Kuchler U.S. potential natural vegetation types, Upper Makefield Township, Pennsylvania would have an Appalachian Oak (104) vegetation type with an Eastern Hardwood Forest (25) vegetation form.

== Notable people ==
- Paul D. Zimmerman, screenwriter (The King of Comedy)
