= London Purchase Farm =

- John Chapman House
- U.S. National Register of Historic Places
- U.S. Historic district – Contributing property
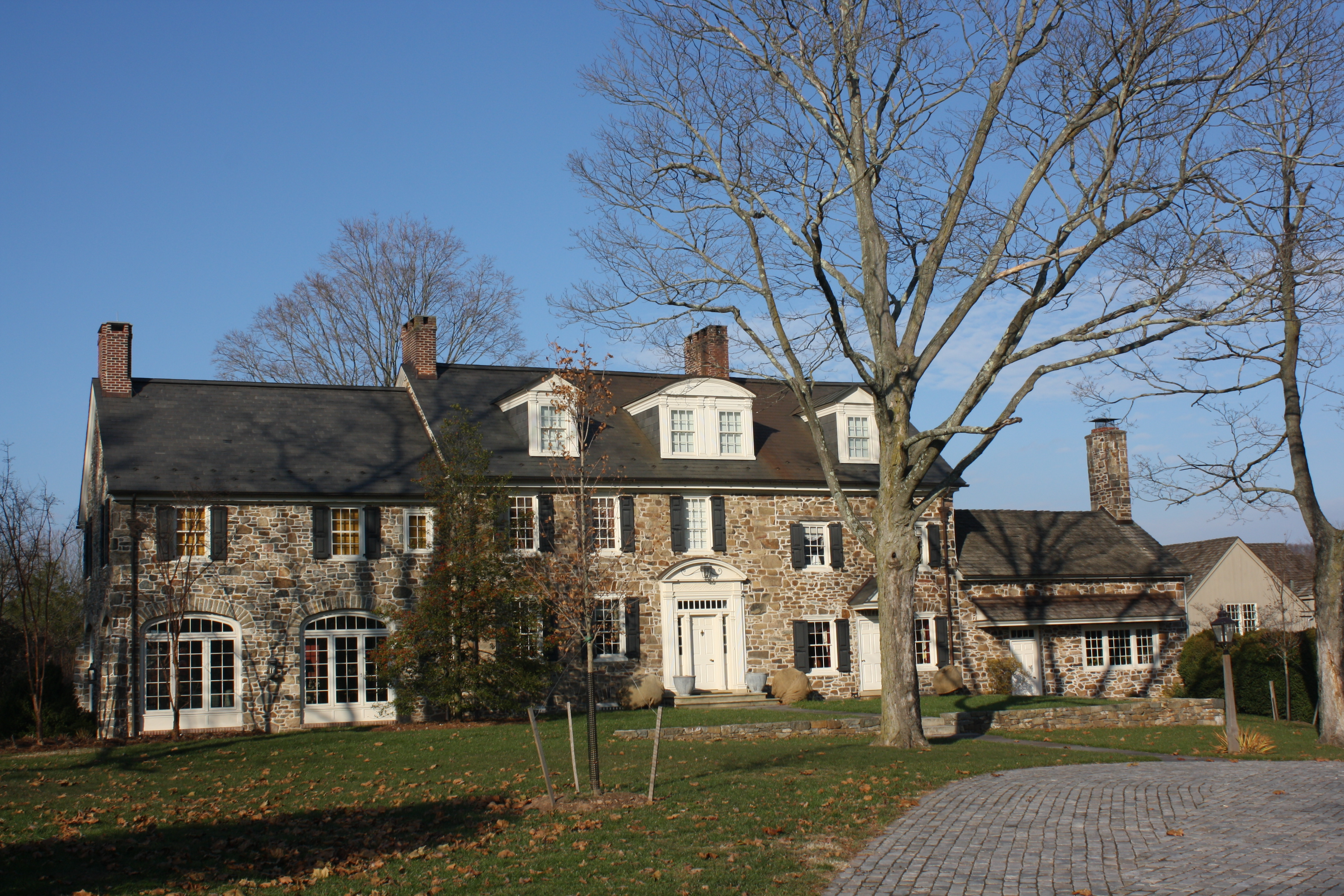
- London Purchase Farmhouse. November 2012.

- Location within Pennsylvania
- Location: PA 232 and Eagle Road, Upper Makefield Township, Pennsylvania
- Nearest city: New Hope, Pennsylvania
- Coordinates: 40°18′46″N 74°56′57″W
- Built: 1735
- Part of: Washington's Crossing (ID66000650)
- NRHP reference No.: 74001757

Significant dates
- Added to NRHP: January 24, 1974
- Designated CP: October 15, 1966

The London Purchase Farm, also known as the John Chapman House, is a two-and-one-half story stone house located on Eagle Road in Upper Makefield Township, Pennsylvania, United States. In late December 1776, prior to the Battle of Trenton, it served as the headquarters for General Henry Knox and Captain Alexander Hamilton of the Continental Army during the American Revolutionary War. It was listed as a contributing property of Washington's Crossing on October 15, 1966. The house was listed individually on the National Register of Historic Places on January 24, 1974, for its significance in military history.

== History ==
The farm was within a tract of 5,000 acres purchased by the London Land Company of Pennsylvania in 1699. The company leased most of the land to individuals for the next sixty years. About twenty percent of the land was apparently sold rather than leased.

This portion of the London Company tract is connected to three generations of John Chapmans. The first John Chapman who owned the Upper Makefield was actually the second of that name in Bucks County. He was the son of the original immigrant John Chapman, one of the first settlers of Wrightstown Township immediately to the west of Upper Makefield Township. John Chapman, the son (born 11 mo. 11, 1678), was surveyor for Bucks County for many years and was also a justice of the peace. On November 10, 1739, he married Ruth (the daughter of John and Mary Wilkinson, and had one son, John. He lived and died in Wrightstown Township and did not live in Upper Makefield.

The property was one of many owned by John Chapman, of Wrightstown. In addition to owning property in Wrightstown and Upper Makefield, he owned 300 acres in Durham Township, Bucks County and 200 acres in New Jersey, a partial interest in a saw mill in Wrightstown and a grist mill northwest of Doylestown. As Deputy Surveyor of Bucks County, John Chapman was a key figure in the famous Walking Purchase of 1737 that opened up nearly 1200 square miles of land to European development.

There is no recorded deed for John Chapman’s purchase of what is now known as London Purchase Farm. The earliest indication of his association with the property comes from a tax list. The 1733 tax list for Upper Makefield reveals that taxes were being paid on John Chapman’s estate. This reference is followed up by a 1736 road survey for what is today part of Eagle Road labeling the property as being owned by John Chapman, but occupied by William Griffin. John Chapman’s will dated April 6, 1743 gives a property to his son John Chapman when he turned 21 years of age.

At the time his will was written, John Chapman lived in Wrightstown Township on a portion of a 536-acre property that he and his brother Abraham owned. The will gave the homestead, the property occupied by William [Griffon] Griffin as well as a tract “lying by River Delaware where Joseph Don [Doan] liveth” to his son John. The fact that John Chapman willed his property to his son, John Chapman, in 1743 indicates that he actually held title to the property rather than renting it from the London Land Company. The fact that there was a tenant on the property for at least a decade indicates that there was a house on the land. The oldest part of the Manor House was built circa 1735. The Carriage House was built in 1794 and the oldest part of the Barn was built in 1783, as per the date stones on the structures. The property is currently approximately 70 acres in size.

At the death of surveyor John Chapman in 1743, his only son, John Chapman (August 18, 1740 – January 27, 1800) was only three when his father’s will was written. John Chapman officially inherited his father’s property when he turned twenty-one in 1761. This third generation John Chapman, studied Medicine in Philadelphia in 1763-64 and was eventually commonly referred to as Dr. John Chapman as a way to distinguish him from his grandfather, father and son, and cousins, of the same name.

It is the third generation John Chapman that is most significantly associated with the property. He is documented as living on his Upper Makefield property in the 1770s. It seems likely that the core of the current house was constructed in the 1760s (either at the time Dr. John Chapman took title to the property in 1761) or by the time of his marriage in 1767. Dr. Chapman married Mercy Beaumont in 1767. Mercy was the daughter of John Beaumont who owned over 500 acres of the land to the north and east of the Chapman property. Beaumont’s tract included what is now known as Bowman’s Hill and extended along the Delaware River to include a ferry landing that became known as Beaumont's Ferry and the site of the future village of Brownsburg. A family journal states that Dr. Chapman moved to the property “about the year 1772” where he resided for the remainder of his life.

The Chapman house was the headquarters of the Artillery Battalion of the American Army under General Henry Knox and Colonel Alexander Hamilton in December 1776, as American troops were encamped in Bucks County after the long retreat across New Jersey, and from where they launched their attack against the Hessian troops encamped in Trenton, New Jersey, on the morning of December 26, 1776. This was undoubtedly due to the fact that it was a large manor house and the home of someone who apparently embraced the Patriot cause. According to a neighbor, Peter Cattell, Washington visited the home several times for meetings with Knox and Hamilton. Of note, Hamilton was sick in bed, in the back portion of the house, for several days before joining Washington.

John Chapman was a Representative to the Fifth Congress (from March 4, 1797-March 3, 1799); from Pennsylvania as a member of the Federalist Party. He worked closely at this time with Alexander Hamilton, who was the first Secretary of the Treasury. According to the Biographical Dictionary of Congress, this John Chapman was born in Wrightstown Township, Bucks County, Pennsylvania., October 18, 1740. He was commissioned justice of the peace February 25, 1779, and was one of the justices commissioned judge of the court of common pleas of Bucks County, the same year. He was also a member of the Constitution Ratification Convention in Pennsylvania, and a member of the American Philosophical Society.

No detailed records of houses exist for Upper Makefield until 1795. At that time John Chapman “farmer and doctor” owned three farms. The homestead farm of 255 acres had a “large stone house and stone barn”. The assessed value of the property in 1798 was $1,100 and was the highest assessment in the township.

On February 5, 1800, Dr. John Chapman wrote his will in which he divided his property between his three sons, John, Seth and Josiah Chapman His son and namesake John received the portion of the property directly related to London Purchase Farm. This John Chapman (born 1768-died 1840) owned the property until his death. After his death, the majority of the property was purchased by his son, William R. Chapman.

From the 1930s to the 1950s the house was owned by Henry and Paula Chapin, and operated as a farm with the help of their children, Charlotte, Anthony and Penney.

In the summer of 1948, the owners rented the house to the Percival family. In 1957, the Nelson and Nondas Case bought the house and maintained ownership for three or four years. Mr. Henry Welling and Mr. & Mrs. John H. Welling owned the property and resided here from 1962 to 1966. Theodore N. Luz, wife Edith K. Luz, and their five children, Dennis, Nancy, Linda, Kristin and Michael occupied the home from 1966 to 1968. The James J. O'Brien family lived there in 1971. Since then the house has been sold several times. The property includes the main house, a barn, a carriage house, a guest house, and a pond.

The O'Brien family owned the estate from August 1969 to October 1973. During this time the estate was situated on 10 acres (40,000 m^{2}) of land plus an additional 74 acres (30 ha) of surrounding property on which local farms planted soy bean and corn crops.

== See also ==
- National Register of Historic Places listings in Bucks County, Pennsylvania
