= Smith Family Farmstead =

Historic house in Pennsylvania, United States

- U.S. National Register of Historic Places
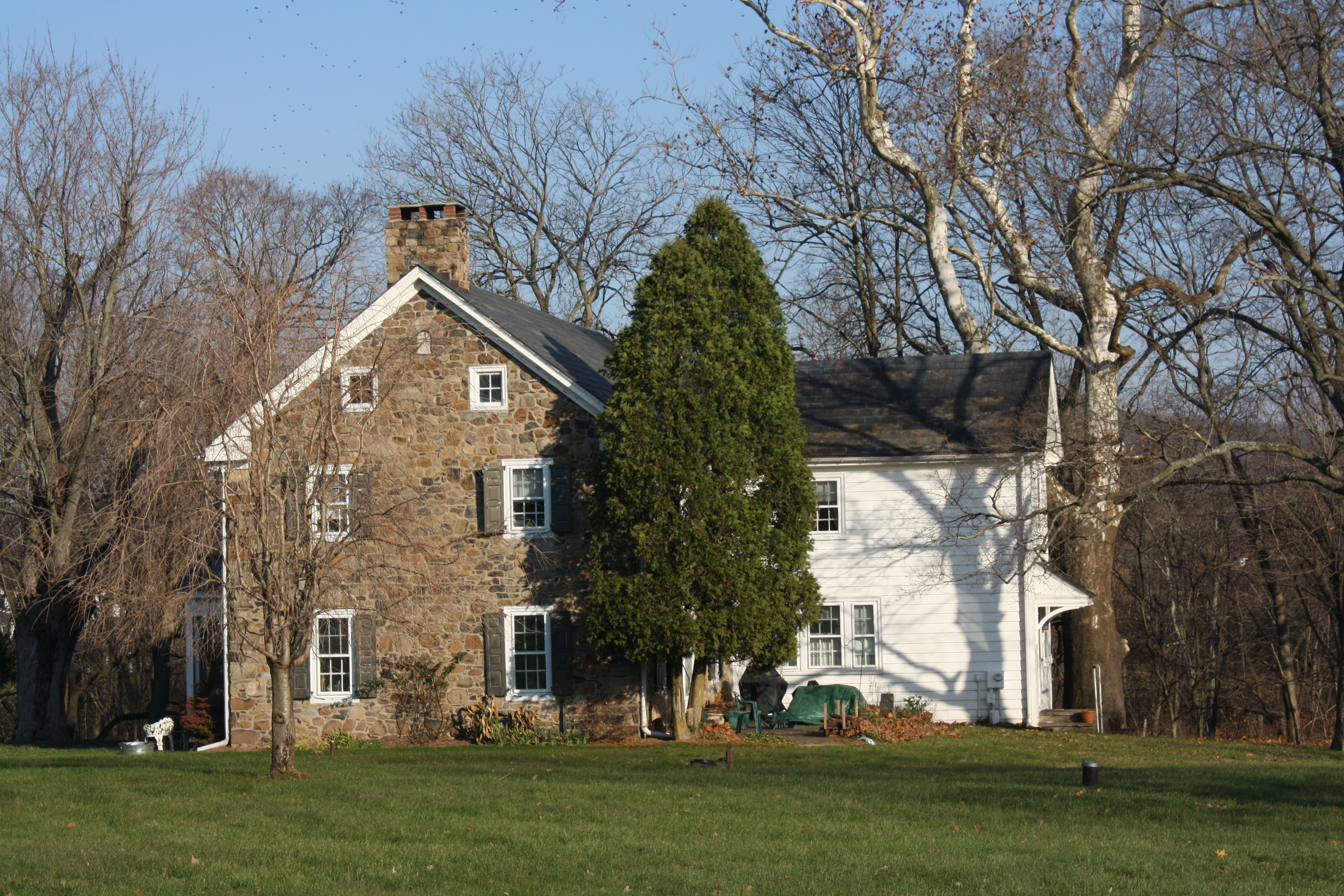
- Smith Family Farmhouse. November 2012.

- Location within Pennsylvania Location within the United States
- Location: South of New Hope on River Road, Upper Makefield Township, Pennsylvania
- Coordinates: 40°19′6″N 74°55′39″W
- Area: 2 acres (0.81 ha)
- Built: 1767
- NRHP reference No.: 78002354
- Added to NRHP: January 30, 1978

Smith Family Farmstead, also known as Riverside, is a historic home located at Upper Makefield Township, Bucks County, Pennsylvania. It was built in 1767, and is a 2 1/2-story, three bay by two bay, gable roofed stone dwelling. A one bay by two bay, stone and frame addition was built in 1945. Also on the property is a contributing two-story stone building used as a garage. It was the birthplace of U.S. Senator from Indiana Oliver H. Smith (1794-1859).

It was added to the National Register of Historic Places in 1978.

== Gallery ==
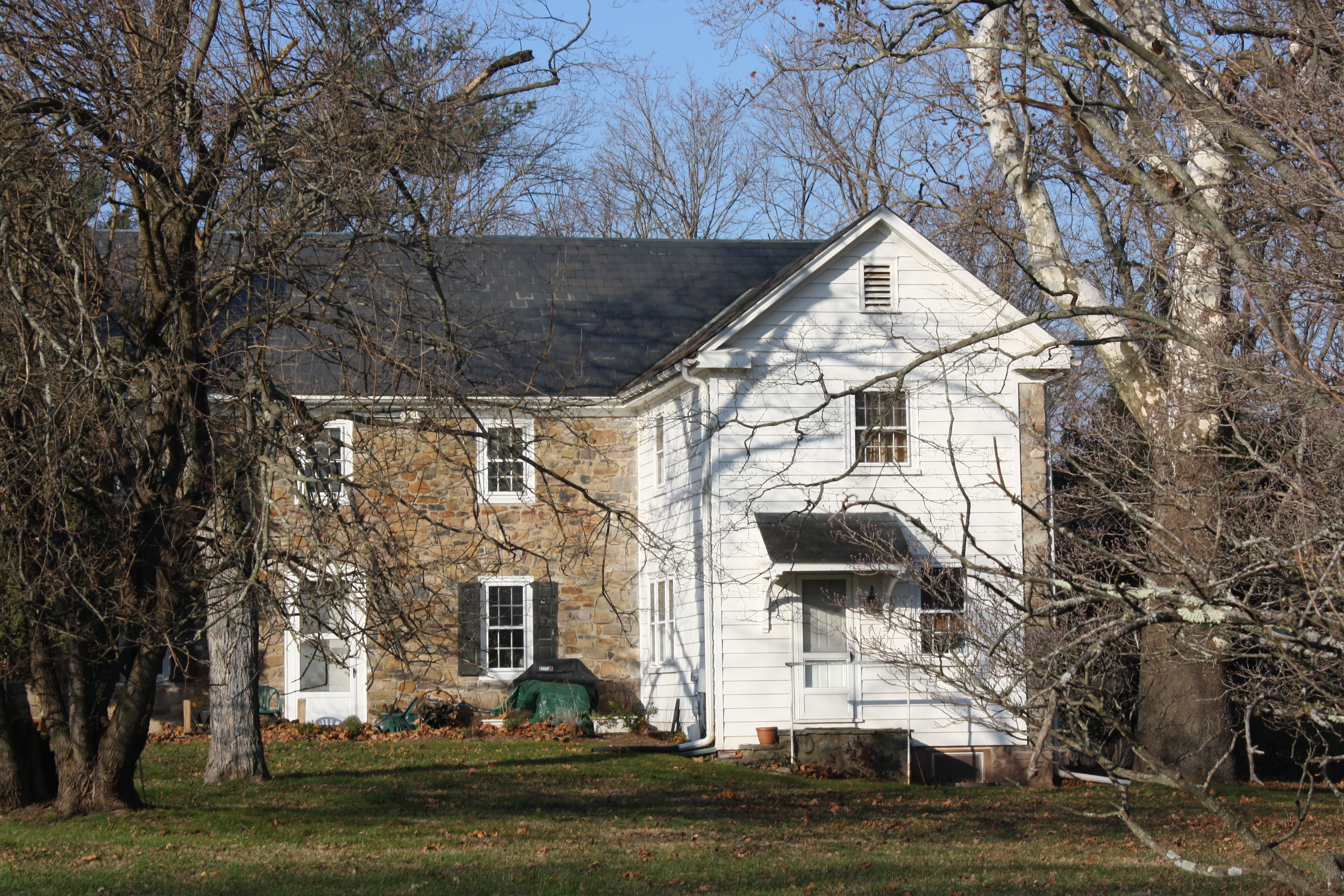
Farmhouse, east side.

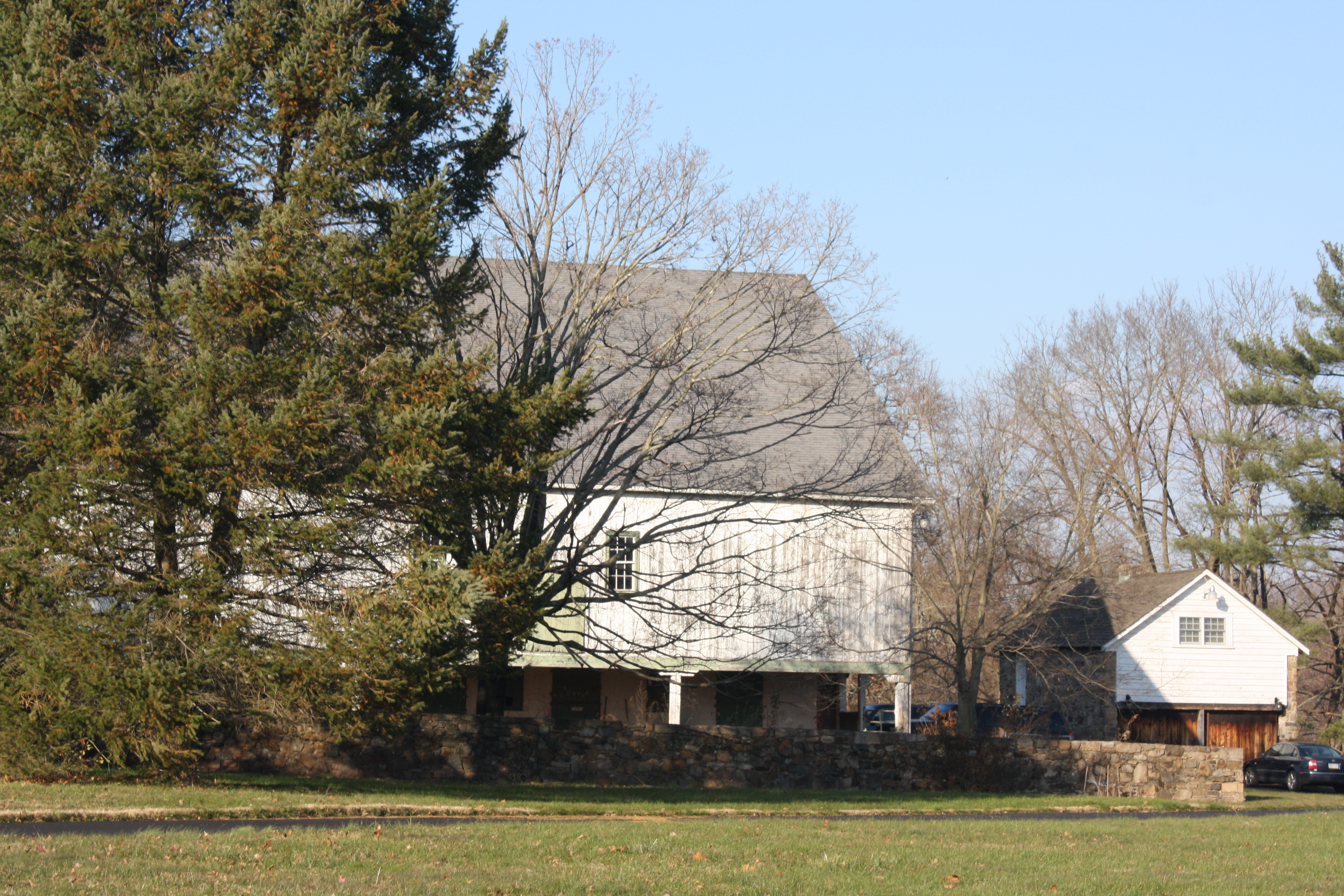
Garage.
