= Hayhurst Farm =

Historic house in Pennsylvania, United States

- U.S. National Register of Historic Places
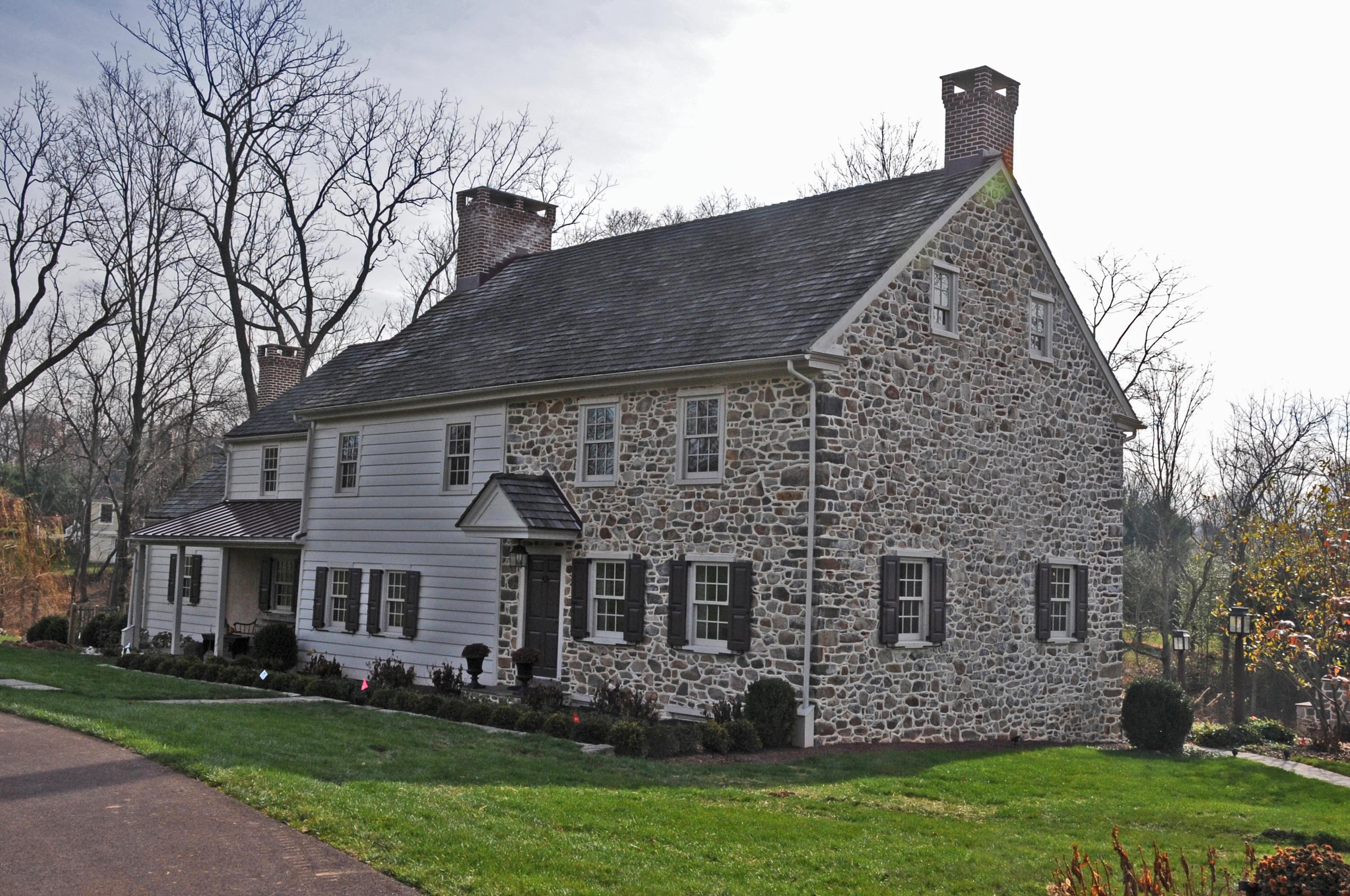

- Location within Pennsylvania Location within the United States
- Nearest city: Wrightstown, Pennsylvania
- Area: 85 acres (34 ha)
- Built: 1742
- Built by: John Hayhurst
- NRHP reference No.: 74001759
- Added to NRHP: February 12, 1974

The Hayhurst Farm is an historic farmhouse that is located near Wrightstown, Pennsylvania, United States.

== History and architectural features ==
This historic structure was built by Quaker minister John Hayhurst in 1742. Hayhurst was a member of the Wrightstown Friends Meeting. General John Sullivan stayed at the farm during the American Revolution, beginning on December 20–25, 1776, before crossing the Delaware River and leading troops in the Battle of Trenton on the morning of December 26.

The farm was listed on the National Register of Historic Places in 1974.
