= Eagle Tavern (Watkinsville, Georgia) =

- U.S. National Register of Historic Places
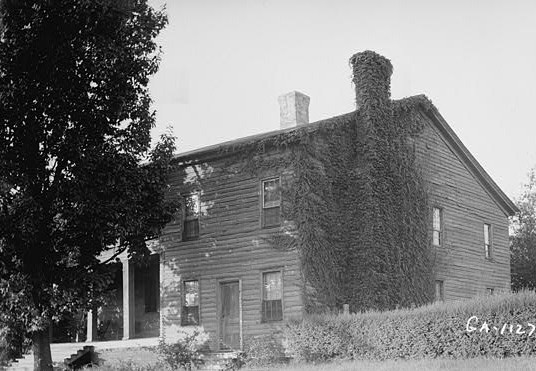
- Eagle Tavern circa 1936

- Location within Georgia
- Location: Watkinsville, Georgia, United States
- Coordinates: 33°51′50.8854″N 83°24′34.6284″W
- Built: 1801
- NRHP reference No.: 70000215
- Added to NRHP: 13 May 1970

The Eagle Tavern is one of the earliest surviving structures in Watkinsville, Oconee County, Georgia, United States. The Eagle Tavern was built circa 1801 but possibly as early as 1794. In the early part of the 19th century, the city of Watkinsville, Georgia was on the frontier of Creek and Cherokee Indian Territories. The site of the tavern may also have been the site of Fort Edwards, a gathering place for settlers seeking protection from attack by the Creek and Cherokee. The building housed a hotel until about 1930. The tavern was added to the National Register of Historic Places on 13 May 1970.

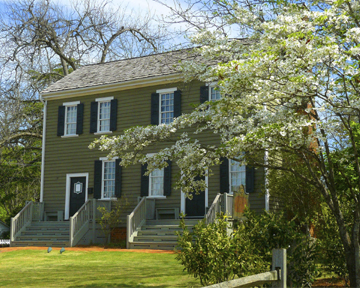
The Eagle Tavern Museum
