= Trenton Ferry Historic District =

Historic district in New Jersey, United States

- U.S. National Register of Historic Places
- U.S. Historic district
- New Jersey Register of Historic Places
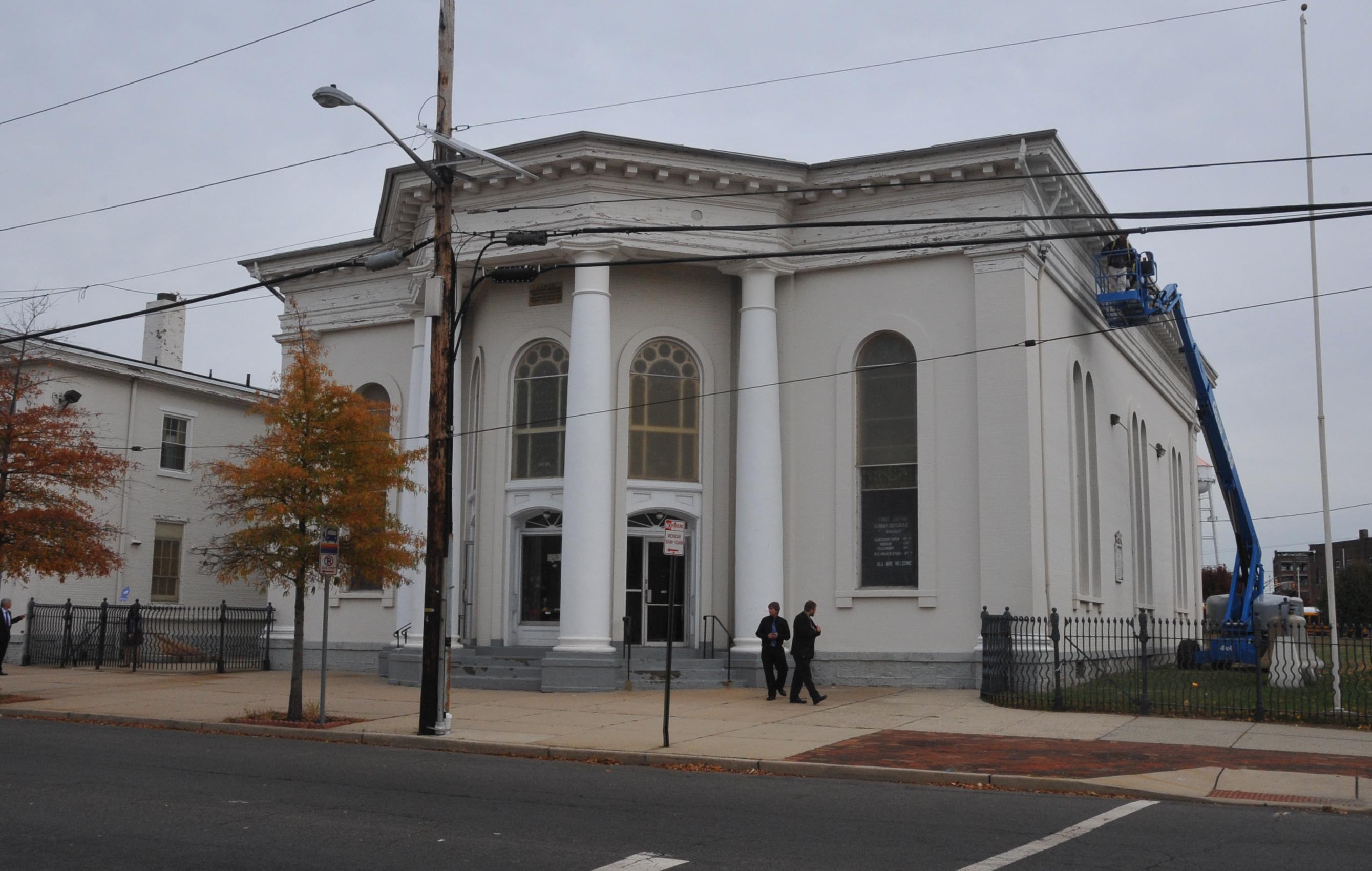
- First Baptist Church, built 1858, the graveyard dates to revolutionary times

- Location within Mercer County, New Jersey Location within New Jersey Location within the United States
- Location: Roughly bounded by South Broad and Federal Streets, the Delaware River and the Amtrak Northeast Corridor in Trenton, New Jersey
- Coordinates: 40°12′36″N 74°45′34″W
- Area: 69 acres (28 ha)
- Built: 1704-1938
- Architect: John Notman (architect), Jonathan Doan (architect/builder), Robert Aitkin/William Johnson (builder)
- Architectural style: Early Republic, Late Victorian
- NRHP reference No.: 13000355
- NJRHP No.: 4789

Significant dates
- Added to NRHP: June 26, 2013
- Designated NJRHP: April 4, 2013

The Trenton Ferry Historic District is a historic mixed-use urban working class neighborhood in Trenton, New Jersey that is primarily composed of modest row houses, schools, churches, and commercial buildings. The neighborhood has roots in the 18th century but the majority of its fabric dates to the 19th and early 20th centuries. The district has few modern intrusions and has retained its historic character. The district was added to the National Register of Historic Places on June 26, 2013. It includes 581 contributing buildings and three contributing sites.

== See also ==
- National Register of Historic Places listings in Mercer County, New Jersey
