= Eagle Tavern (Upper Makefield Township, Pennsylvania) =

- U.S. National Register of Historic Places
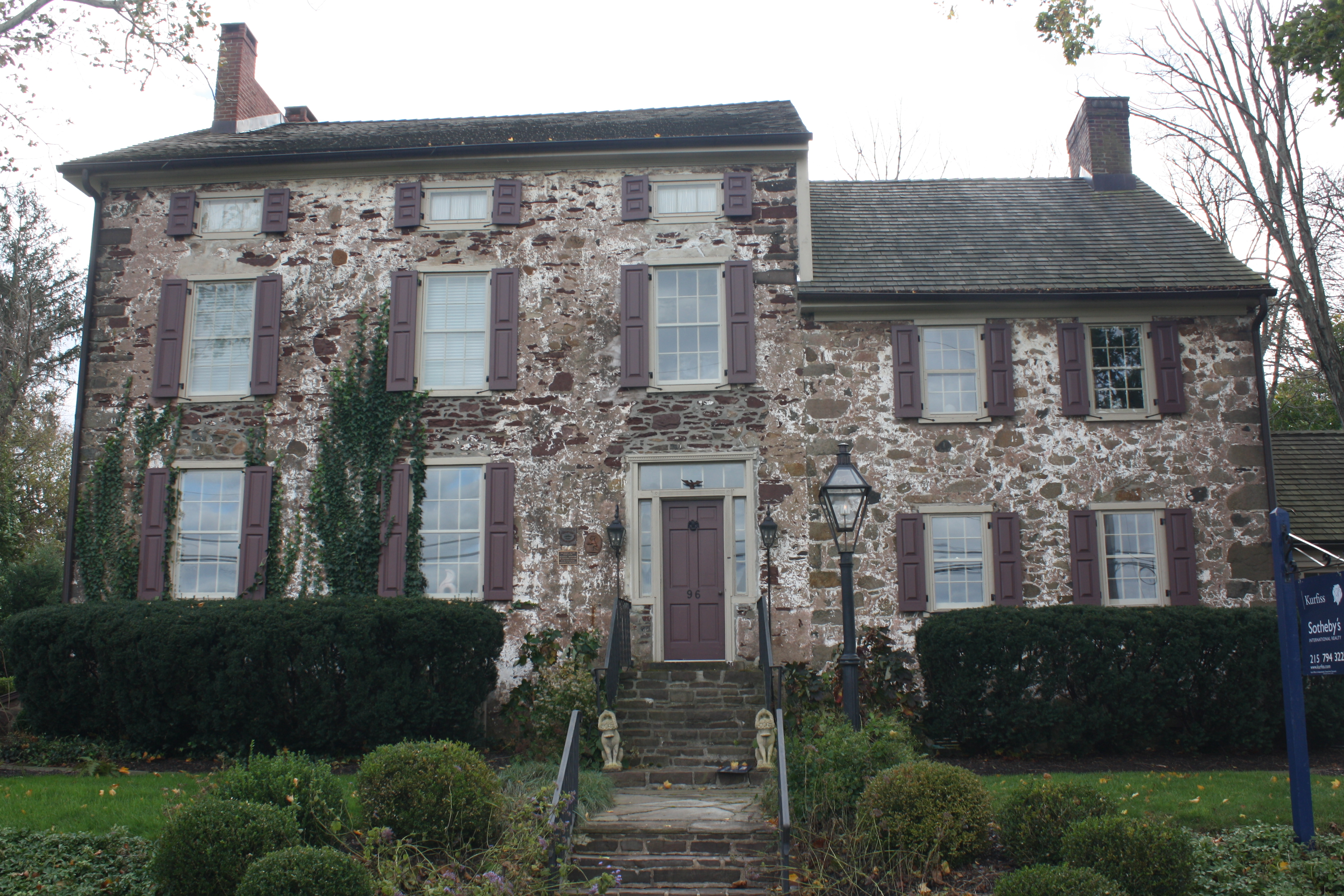
- Eagle Tavern. November 2012.

- Location within Pennsylvania Location within the United States
- Location: South of New Hope, Upper Makefield Township, Pennsylvania
- Coordinates: 40°17′30″N 74°56′23.3″W
- Area: 0.5 acres (0.20 ha)
- Built: c. 1800, 1854
- Built by: Van Horn, Moses
- NRHP reference No.: 78002353
- Added to NRHP: April 20, 1978

Eagle Tavern is an historic inn and tavern located at Upper Makefield Township, Bucks County, Pennsylvania, which was built circa 1800.

It was listed on the National Register of Historic Places in 1978.

== History and architectural features ==
The original section was erected sometime around 1800. It is a 2 1/2-story, two-bay stone structure with a steeply pitched gable roof. A larger section that is a 2 1/2-story, three-bay-by-three-bay, stone structure was added in 1854. It features eyebrow windows on the front and rear facades. During the 19th century, the building was used as a hotel, store, post office, and polling place. It was later converted to a single-family residence.

== Gallery ==
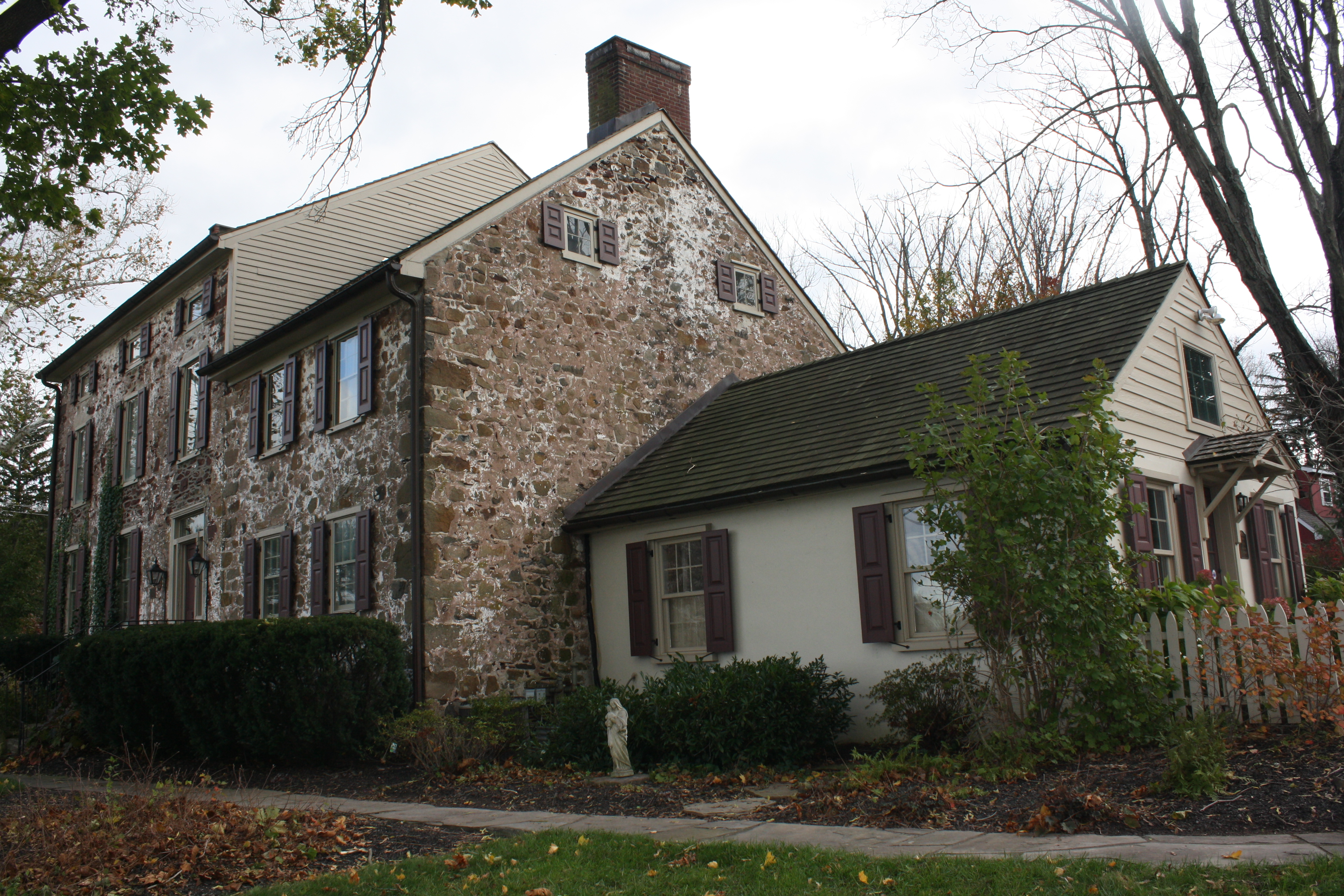
General view from north

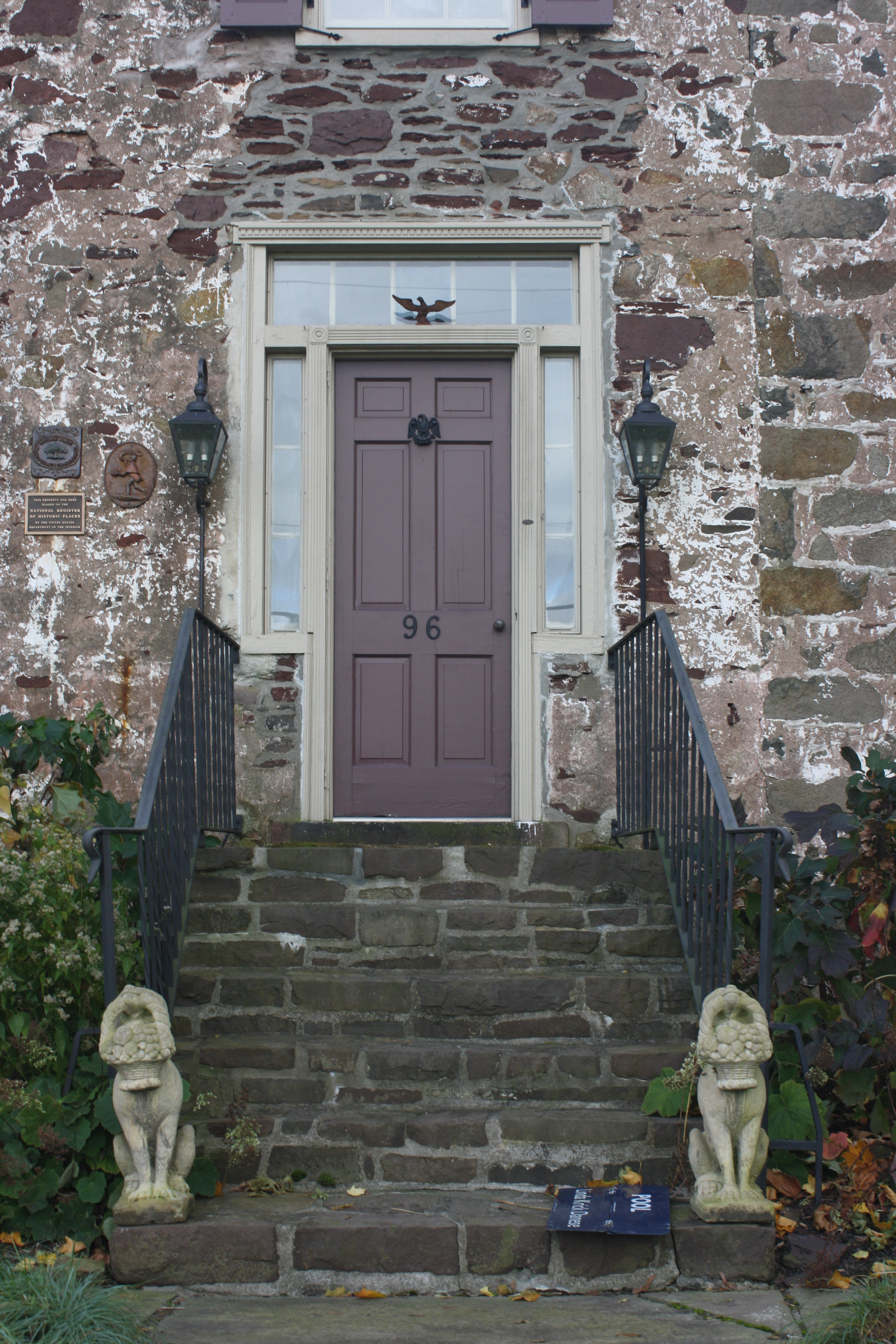
Front door

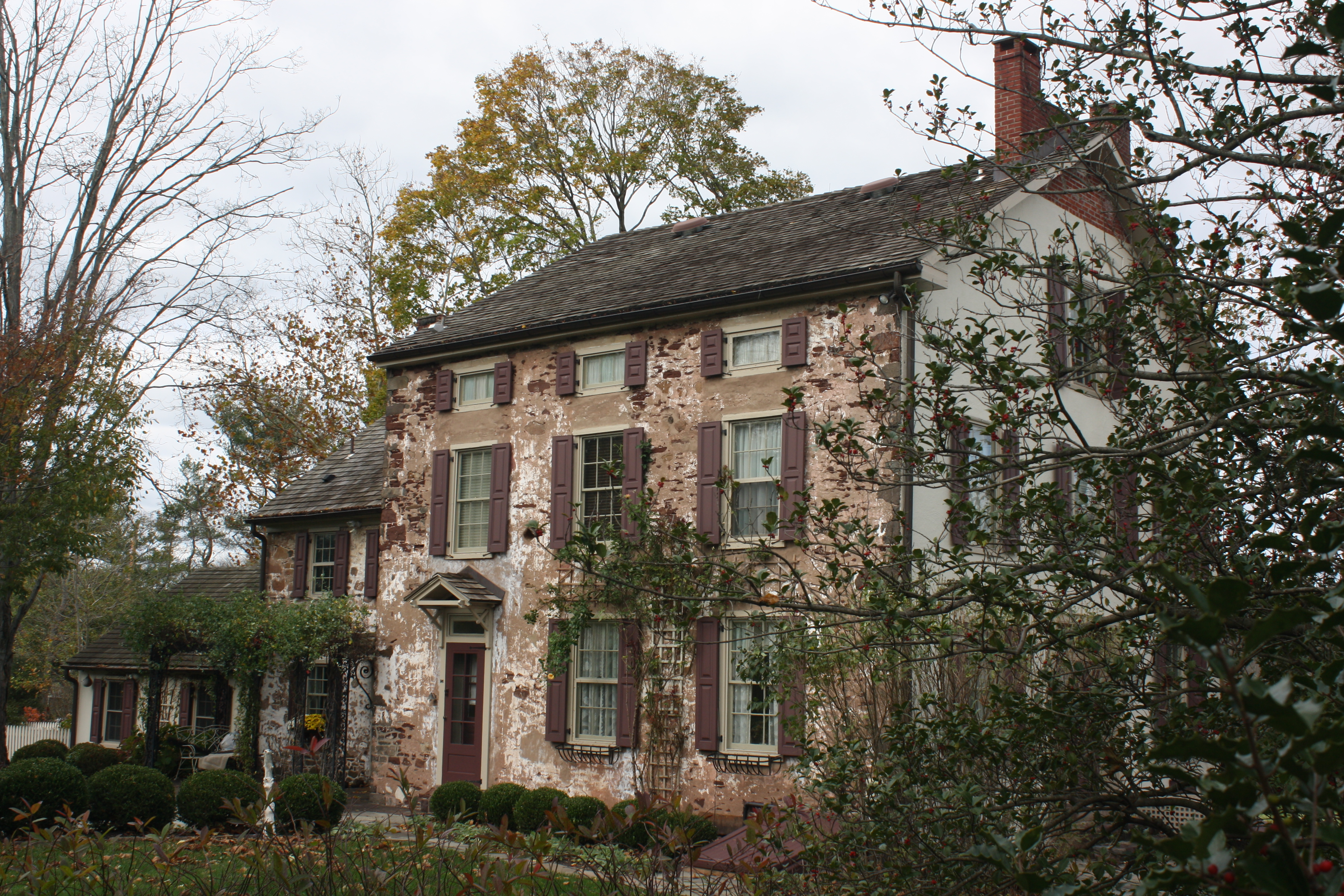
Southern side

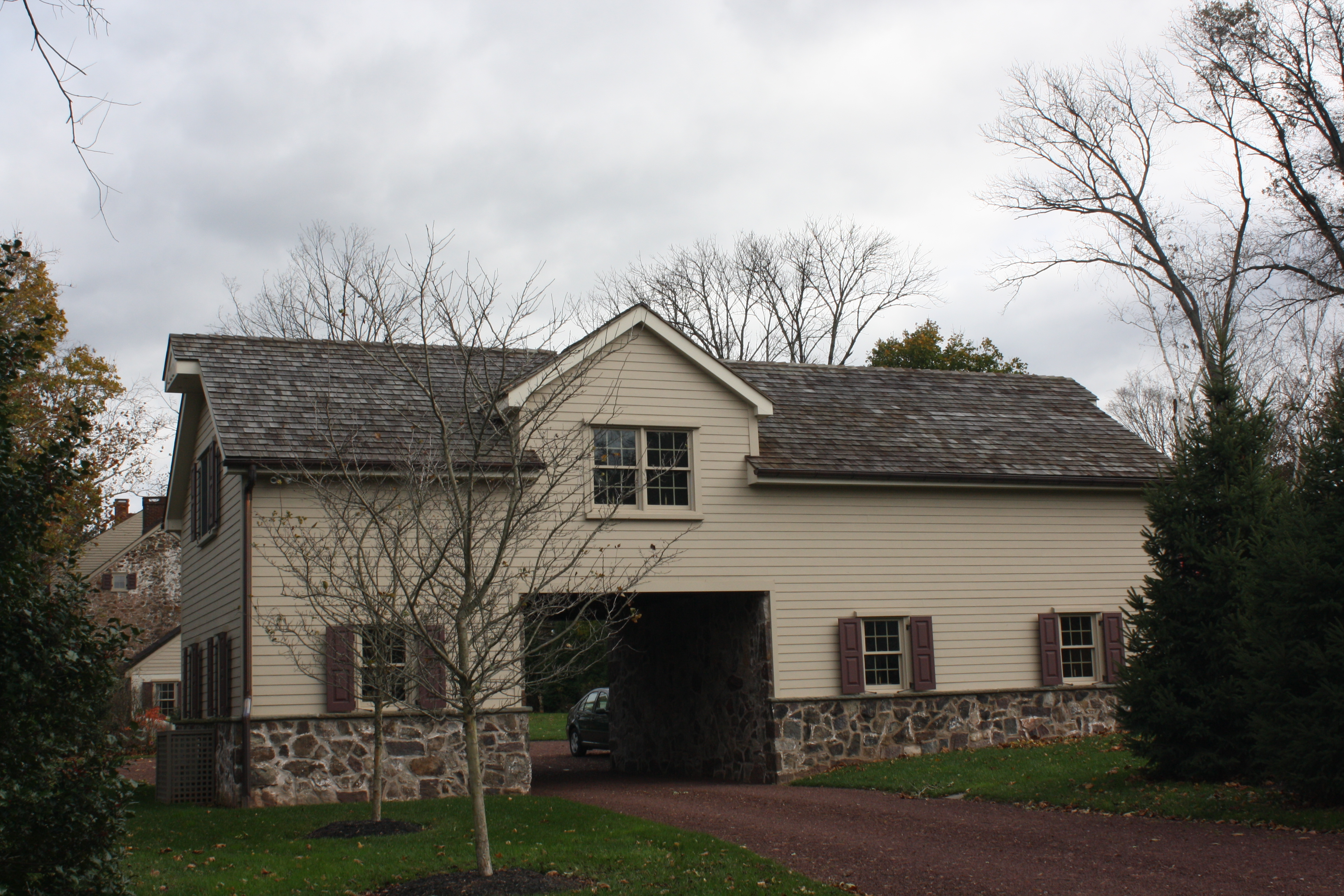
West outbuilding
