= Eagle Tavern (Eagle, Pennsylvania) =

Historic tavern in Eagle, Pennsylvania

Coordinates: 40.078252°N 75.688285°W

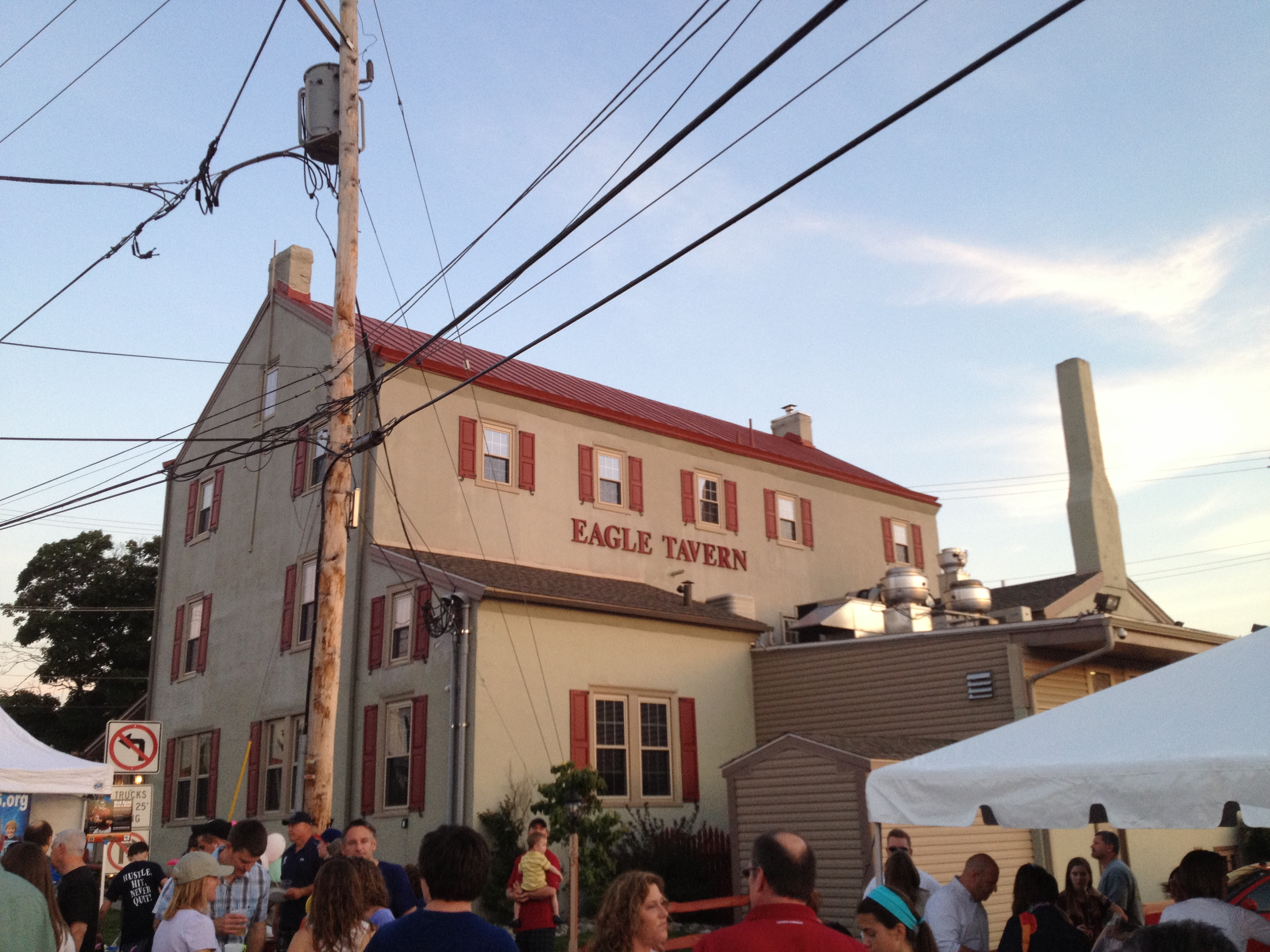
Eagle Tavern seen from PA Route 100

Eagle Tavern in Eagle, Pennsylvania, is a historic tavern built in 1702 situated at the intersection of Pottstown Pike and Little Conestoga Road. The current building was built over the original structure in 1799. The original Eagle Tavern liquor licence dates to August 17, 1727. It was a hangout for the notorious outlaws, the Doan brothers, who operated before the Revolutionary War.

In the first decade of the 2000s a bypass was built to reduce traffic on Pottstown Pike without damaging historic structures, such as the Eagle Tavern.

John Bull of The Philadelphia Inquirer praised the cuisine as "delightful." He praised the Steak Morgan as a "dish fit for a king" and the Chicken Chesapeake was nearly as good.

A fire caused extensive smoke damage to the building on March 9, 2010. The fire caused by a burning cigarette was later ruled accidental. The tavern reopened several months later after extensive renovations. In 2018, the Eagle Tavern was taken over by Matt Krueger of Victory Brewing Company, who gutted the interior and installed a new bar.

In 2020, the Eagle Tavern was acquired by new owners and renamed Bloom Southern Kitchen.
