= List of statues of George Washington =

A list of notable statues of George Washington, an American Founding Father, commanding general of the Continental Army during the American Revolutionary War, and the first president of the United States.

== List ==
=== United States ===
Image	Article	Location	Date	Sculptor	Notes
	Statue of George Washington	Richmond, Virginia; Virginia State Capitol	1791–1792	Jean-Antoine Houdon	marble statue, has numerous bronze copies by Hubard and Gorham
	Statue of George Washington	Philadelphia, Pennsylvania; Pennsylvania Academy of Fine Arts	1815	William Rush	wooden statue, relocated in 1824 to Independence Hall, now at the Second Bank of the United States
	George Washington	Raleigh, North Carolina; North Carolina State House	1820	Antonio Canova	destroyed by fire on June 21, 1831
	George Washington	Raleigh, North Carolina; North Carolina Museum of History	1910	Antonio Canova	plaster replica of the 1820 statue
	George Washington	Raleigh, North Carolina; North Carolina State Capitol	1970	Antonio Canova	marble copy by Romano Vio of the 1820 statue
	Statue of George Washington	Boston, Massachusetts; Massachusetts State House	1826	Francis Chantrey	
	Washington Monument	Baltimore, Maryland; Mount Vernon Place & Washington Place	1829	Enrico Causici	marble statue atop the monument designed by architect Robert Mills
	George Washington	Washington, D.C. National Museum of American History	1840	Horatio Greenough	marble statue first shown in the United States Capitol rotunda
	Statue of George Washington	Washington, D.C. Smithsonian American Art Museum	c. 1841	Ferdinand Pettrich	plaster statue painted bronze
	Equestrian statue of George Washington	New York City, New York; Union Square	1856	Henry Kirke Brown	
	George Washington	Baltimore, Maryland; Druid Hill Park	1857	Edward Sheffield Bartholomew	
	Virginia Washington Monument	Richmond, Virginia; Capitol Square	1858–1869	Thomas Crawford and Randolph Rogers	
	Lieutenant General George Washington	Washington, D.C. Washington Circle	1860	Clark Mills	
	Statue of George Washington	Philadelphia, Pennsylvania; Independence Hall	1869	Joseph A. Bailly	marble statue, now at Philadelphia City Hall
	Statue of George Washington	Philadelphia, Pennsylvania; Independence Hall	1910	Joseph A. Bailly	bronze replica of the 1869 statue
	Equestrian statue of George Washington	Boston, Massachusetts; Boston Public Garden	1869	Thomas Ball	
	Statue of George Washington	Trenton, New Jersey; Douglass House, Mill Hill	c. 1876	Fratelli Gianfranchi	first displayed at the Centennial Exposition of 1876 in Philadelphia
	Statue of George Washington	Newburyport, Massachusetts	1878	John Quincy Adams Ward	
	Statue of George Washington	New York City, New York; Federal Hall	1883	John Quincy Adams Ward	
	Washington Monument	Milwaukee, Wisconsin; Milwaukee Central Library	1885	Richard Henry Park	
	Statue of George Washington	Newburgh, New York; Tower of Victory, Washington's Headquarters State Historic Site	1887	William Rudolf O'Donovan	Removed from site in 2020 for restoration; expected to return Autumn 2026
	Statue of George Washington	Trenton, New Jersey; Trenton Battle Monument	1893	William Rudolf O'Donovan	bronze statue atop the monument designed by architect John H. Duncan
	Statue of George Washington	Perth Amboy, New Jersey; Market Square, Perth Amboy City Hall	1896	Nels N. Alling	terra cotta statue, dedicated on February 22, 1896
	Equestrian statue of George Washington	Philadelphia, Pennsylvania; Eakins Oval	1897	Rudolf Siemering	bronze statue atop the Washington Monument
	Statue of George Washington	Seattle, Washington; University of Washington	1909	Lorado Taft	
	Equestrian statue of George Washington	Newark, New Jersey; Washington Park	1912	J. Massey Rhind	
	Washington Monument	West Point, New York; United States Military Academy	1916	Henry Kirke Brown	
	Statue of George Washington	Washington Crossing, Pennsylvania; Washington Crossing Historic Park	1916	Unknown	granite statue atop the Washington Crossing Monument
	Princeton Battle Monument	Princeton, New Jersey; New Jersey Route 27	1922	Frederick William MacMonnies and Thomas Hastings	
	Statue of George Washington	Portland, Oregon; German American Society Building	1926–1927	Pompeo Coppini	
	Equestrian statue of George Washington	Morristown, New Jersey; Washington's Headquarters	1927–1928	Frederick Roth	
	Heald Square Monument	Chicago, Illinois; Heald Square	1936-1941	Lorado Taft and Leonard Crunelle	
	Statue of George Washington	Alexandria, Virginia; George Washington Masonic National Memorial	1949	Bryant Baker	bronze statue entitled Illustrious Brother George Washington, dedicated on February 22, 1950
	Statue of George Washington	Austin, Texas; University of Texas at Austin	1955	Pompeo Coppini	
	Tomb of the Unknown Revolutionary War Soldier	Philadelphia, Pennsylvania; Washington Square	1957	Jean-Antoine Houdon and G. Edwin Brumbaugh	
	George Washington on Horseback	Washington, D.C. Washington National Cathedral	1959	Herbert Haseltine	
	Statue of George Washington	Indianapolis, Indiana; Indiana Statehouse	1959	Donald De Lue	
	Point of View	Pittsburgh, Pennsylvania; Point of View Park	2006	James A. West	

=== Outside the United States ===
Image	Article	Location	Date	Sculptor	Notes
	Equestrian statue of George Washington	Paris, France; Place d'Iéna	1900	Daniel Chester French	created with Edward Clark Potter; donated by a committee of American women in memory of the assistance given by France during the American Revolutionary War
	Statue of George Washington	Budapest, Hungary; City Park	1906	Gyula Bezerédi	donated by Hungarians living in the United States
	Statue of George Washington	Mexico City, Mexico; Parque Rosario Castellanos	1912	Pompeo Coppini	originally located on Plaza Washington, moved to the park in the 1970s
	Monument of George Washington	Buenos Aires, Argentina; Parque Tres de Febrero	1913	Charles Keck	donated in support of the celebrations of the Centennial of the May Revolution; side benches removed in 1928
	Statue of George Washington	London, England; Trafalgar Square	1921	bronze copy of Jean-Antoine Houdon’s Richmond statue	a gift of Virginia dedicated to the “Special Relationship” between the United States and Great Britain
	Monument dedicated to George Washington	Bogotá, Colombia; Park of San Diego	1961–1963	Luís Pinto Maldonado	
	Bust of George Washington	Warsaw, Poland; Rondo Jerzego Waszyngtona	1989	Bronisław Koniuszy, Bronisław Kubica	unveiled after the historic visit of President George H.W. Bush in Poland

== See also ==
- Mount Rushmore
- Cultural depictions of George Washington
- List of paintings of George Washington
- List of memorials to George Washington
- List of sculptures of presidents of the United States
- Presidential memorials in the United States
