= Rawlins Park =

Park in Washington, D.C., U.S.

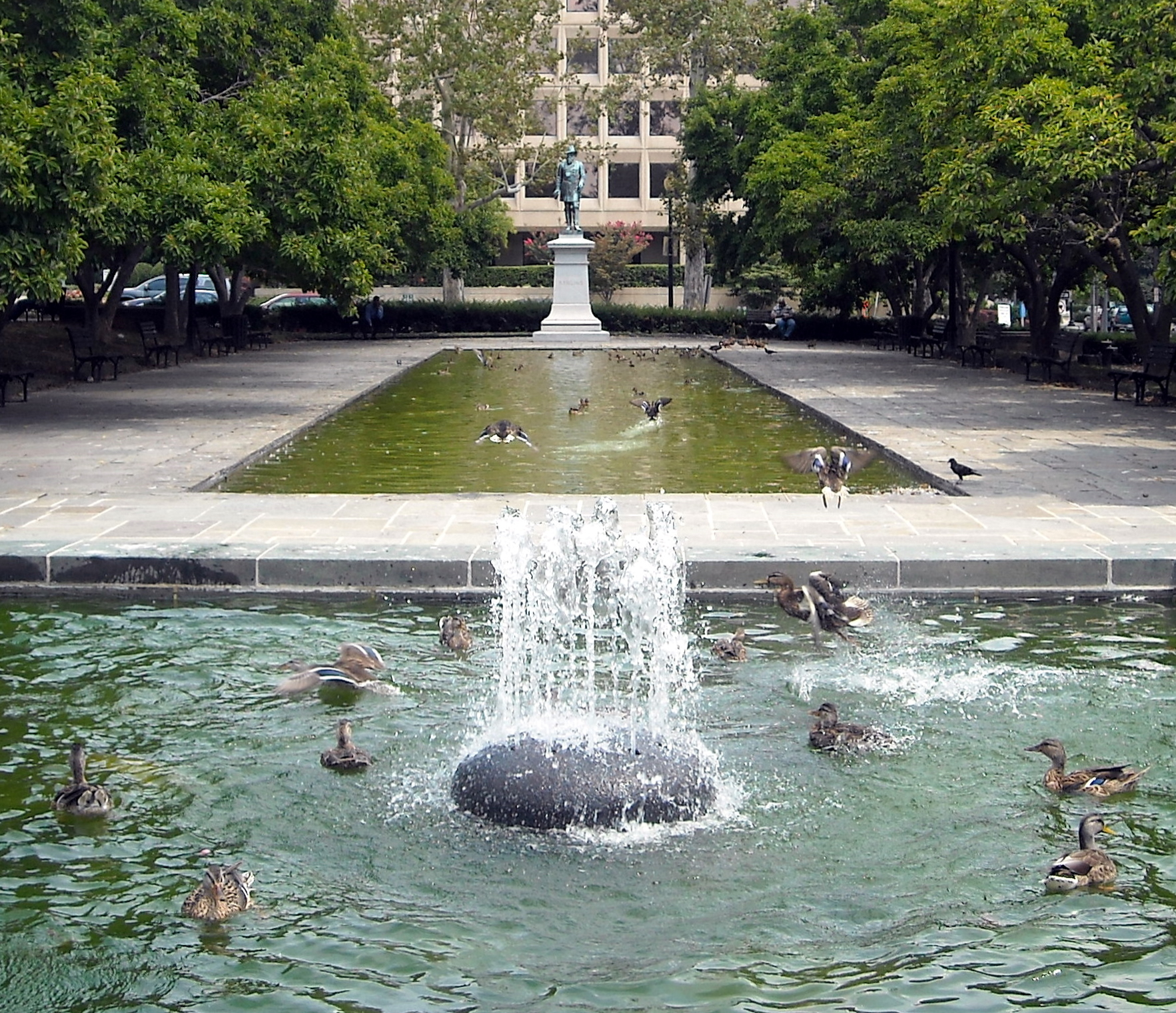
- Rawlins Park in 2008

- Location within Central Washington, D.C.
- Location: Washington, D.C.
- Coordinates: 38°53′45″N 77°02′33″W
- Area: 1.44 acres (0.58 ha)

U.S. Historic district – Contributing property
- Designated: April 24, 1997

D.C. Inventory of Historic Sites
- Designated: November 8, 1964

Rawlins Park is a rectangular public park in the Foggy Bottom neighborhood of Washington, D.C., two blocks west of the White House grounds and two blocks north of the National Mall. The boundaries of the park are 18th Street NW to the east, E Street NW to the south and north, and 19th Street NW to the west. The park was an undeveloped open space for many years, until plans were made to install the statue of John Aaron Rawlins in 1874. Various improvements were made, but the area surrounding the park remained mostly undeveloped. This changed in the 1890s when the area was cleared of marshes, and houses were built on the park's southern border.

The first time the statue of Rawlins was moved occurred in the 1880s, but by 1931, it was returned to the park and has been there ever since. A major development in the park's history came in 1915 when the Interior Department selected the lot on the north side of the park to be its new headquarters. The building was later renamed United States General Services Administration Building after a larger building, the Main Interior Building, was built on the south side of the park in the 1930s. A tunnel runs underneath the park, connecting the two buildings.

The park, which is managed by the National Park Service, encompasses almost 1.5 acres (0.6 ha), and is 150-feet (46 m) wide and 450-feet (137 m) long. There were plans to extend a line of parks similar to Rawlins Park all the way to the Old Naval Observatory, but the only one built is the Walt Whitman Park, located on the Rawlins Park's western edge. In addition to the statue of Rawlins, the park features a central marble fountain with a rectangular pond on each side. One of the redesigns that took place in the 20th-century involved transforming the park from residential to commercial, so office workers have a place to gather outside.

The statue of Rawlins is one of eighteen Civil War Monuments in Washington, D.C., that are collectively listed on the National Register of Historic Places (NRHP) and the District of Columbia Inventory of Historic Sites (DCIHS). The park itself is also a contributing property to the L'Enfant Plan, which is also listed on the NRHP and DCIHS.

== Location and features ==
=== Location ===
Rawlins Park is rectangular, measures 1.44 acres (0.58 ha), and is located in the Foggy Bottom neighborhood of Washington, D.C. The park is bounded by E Street NW on the north and south sides, 18th Street NW on the east side, and 19th Street NW on the west side. New York Avenue NW terminates once it reaches 18th and E Streets NW. Another park, Walt Whitman Park, is located across the street from the 19th Street side.

The park, which measures 150-feet (46 m) wide and 450-feet (137 m) long, is on Reservation 13 and sited two blocks west of the White House grounds and two blocks north of the National Mall's Constitution Gardens. The park is below street level. There is a stairway on the west and northern sides to access the park, and two stairways on the east and southern sides to do the same. It is owned and managed by the National Park Service (NPS).

=== Features ===
In the middle of the park is a marble fountain. On either side of the square-shaped fountain is a rectangular pond. Sodded grass and trees form a barrier between the terrace level of the park and the lower portion. There are additional trees plus shrubs and hedges that divide the park between the terrace sidewalk and the public sidewalks on its border. An ornamental iron fence is on all borders of the park, minus the stairways. There are wood benches along the terrace and lower sidewalks. Lampposts are on the grassy area between the two levels.

==== Rawlins statue ====
On the eastern end of the park is a statue of Civil War General and, during the Ulysses S. Grant administration, Secretary of War John Aaron Rawlins, who is the namesake of the park. The bronze statue depicts Rawlins standing on a granite base. He is facing west and wearing his military uniform. The statue was designed by Joseph A. Bailly and is one of eighteen Civil War Monuments in Washington, D.C., that are collectively listed on the National Register of Historic Places (NRHP) and the District of Columbia Inventory of Historic Sites (DCIHS).

== History ==
=== 18th and 19th centuries ===
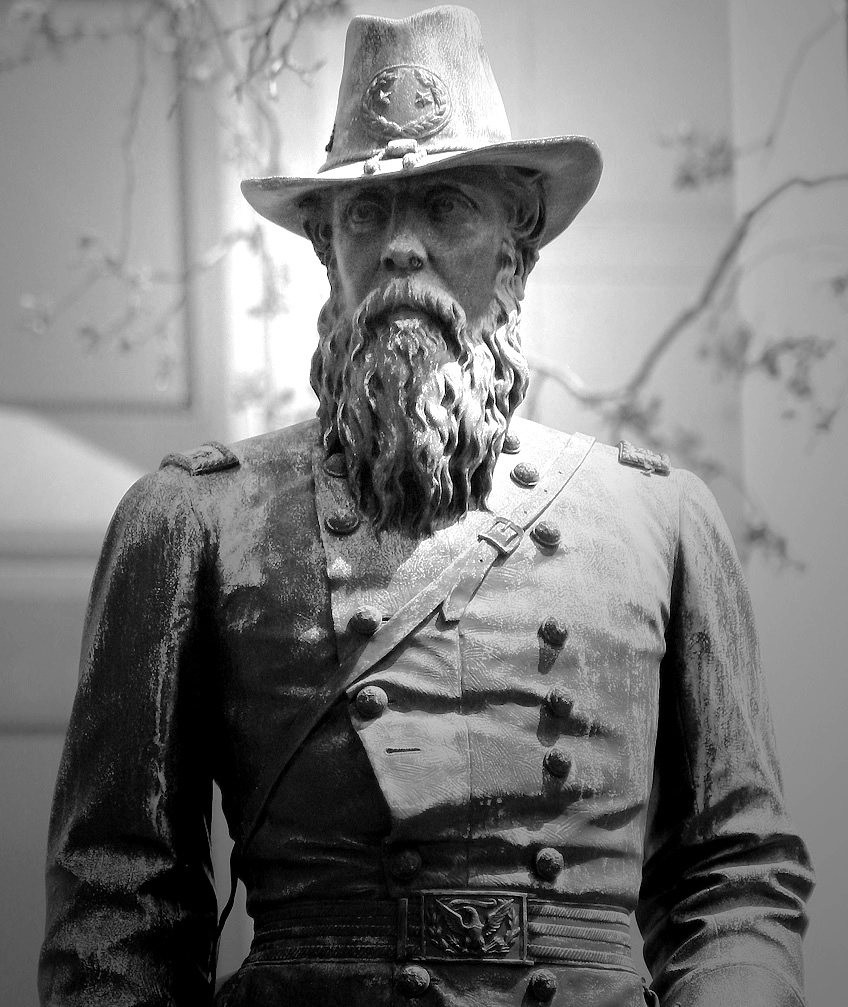
The statue of John Aaron Rawlins

In 1772, the area where the park is located was within the town limits of Hamburgh, a small industrial town along the Potomac River that is now the Foggy Bottom neighborhood. The town border was where the west side of the park stands today. Tiber Creek was one block south, and on the east, a tract of land owned by David Burnes. The area was rather swampy, so development was slow. Although the park is not found in the 1791 L'Enfant Plan, the plan was improved in 1792 by Andrew Ellicott and his team. From that point, the area was always designated as an open space. The first major development around the park was construction of The Octagon House for John Tayloe III in 1799. It is located on the corner of 18th Street and New York Avenue NW. Many social gatherings took place at Tayloe's house, but the surrounding area did not attract housing or office buildings.

By the 1870s, there was still minimal development of the lots surrounding what was then an open space. On June 10, 1872, Congress appropriated $10,000 for the statue of Rawlins to be installed in the park. The following year saw marked improvements of the area due to Alexander "Boss" Shepherd's vision of the city, including paved roads, gas and sewer lines, and sidewalks. Shepherd's friend led the Office of Public Buildings and Grounds, and in 1873 wrote:

This reservation was very much below grade and required heavy filling; soil for which was obtained from the White Lot (now The Ellipse), from the excavation made for the new State War and Navy departments and from a reservation on Massachusetts Avenue between Eleventh and Twelfth streets which was above grade...A few trees, evergreens etc. have been planted in this reservation and are doing well. Two small fountains have been constructed with an ornamental margin and center-piece of rock-work around, and in which plants have been planted. — Orville E. Babcock,

Babcock referred to the open space as Rawlins Park, which became commonly used beginning in 1874, when Rawlins' statue was erected. (the granite base was installed the following year) That year also saw chain-link fencing and decorative lampposts installed in and around the park. Landscaping, including adding multiple trees, was started around this time with the planting of "six junipers, eight Virginia cedars, four dogwoods, one sassafras, one black walnut, three English maples, three spireas, one magnolia, four forsythias, one birch, one Japan quince, and one jasmine."

Even with these improvements, development around the park was minimal. In the 1880s, members of the Union Army veterans group, Grand Army of the Republic (GAR), did not like the fact one of the Civil War statues was placed in such a desolate area. After lobbying government officials, the statue was moved to Reservation 35, near Center Market. Even after the statue and its decorative urns were moved, the park was still called Rawlins Park. The United States Army Corps of Engineers began filling in marshes in the Foggy Bottom area during the 1890s. Some rowhouses on the southern and western sides of Rawlins Park were built during this time.

=== 20th and 21st centuries ===
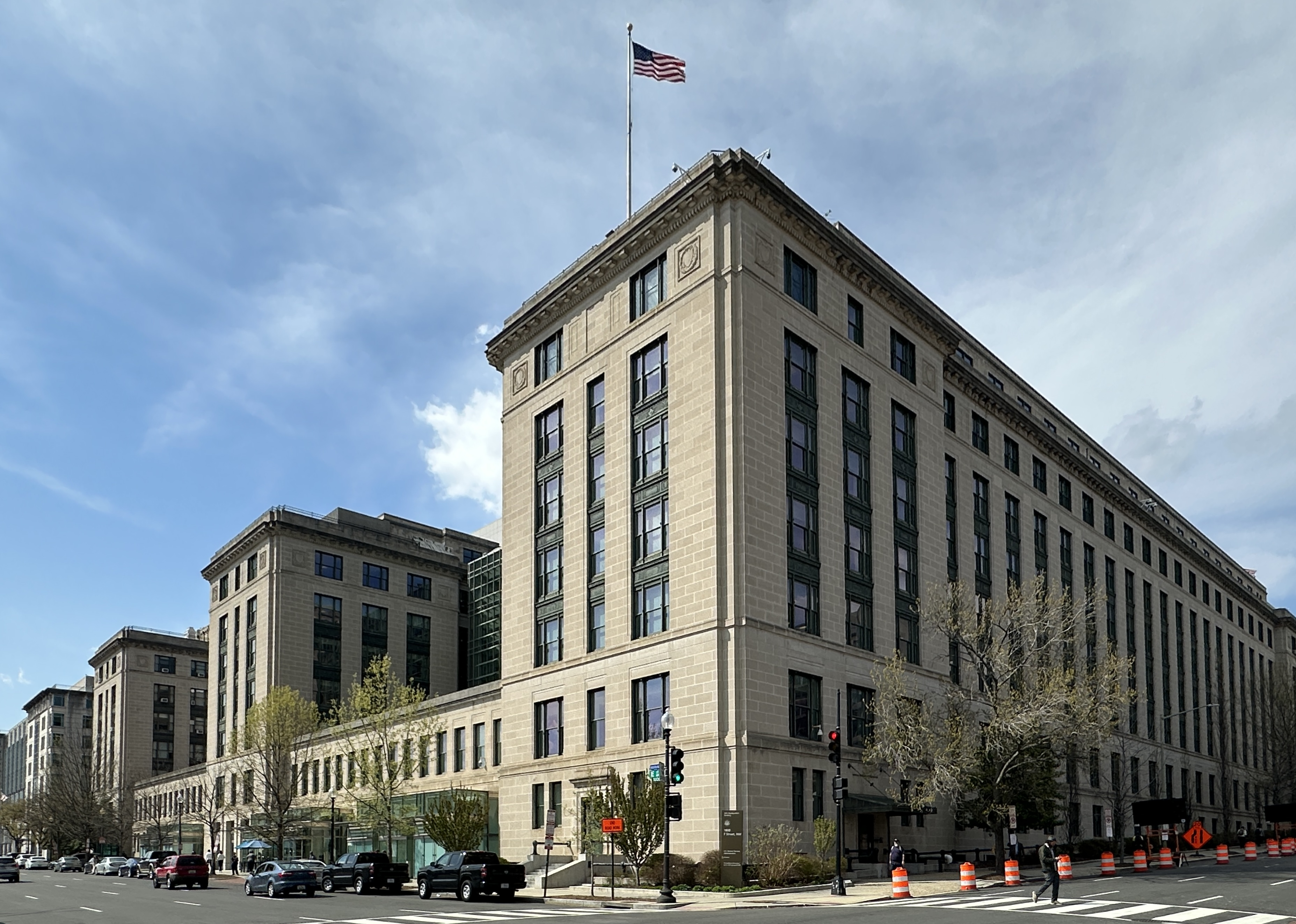
United States General Services Administration Building, completed in 1917, is on the north side of the park

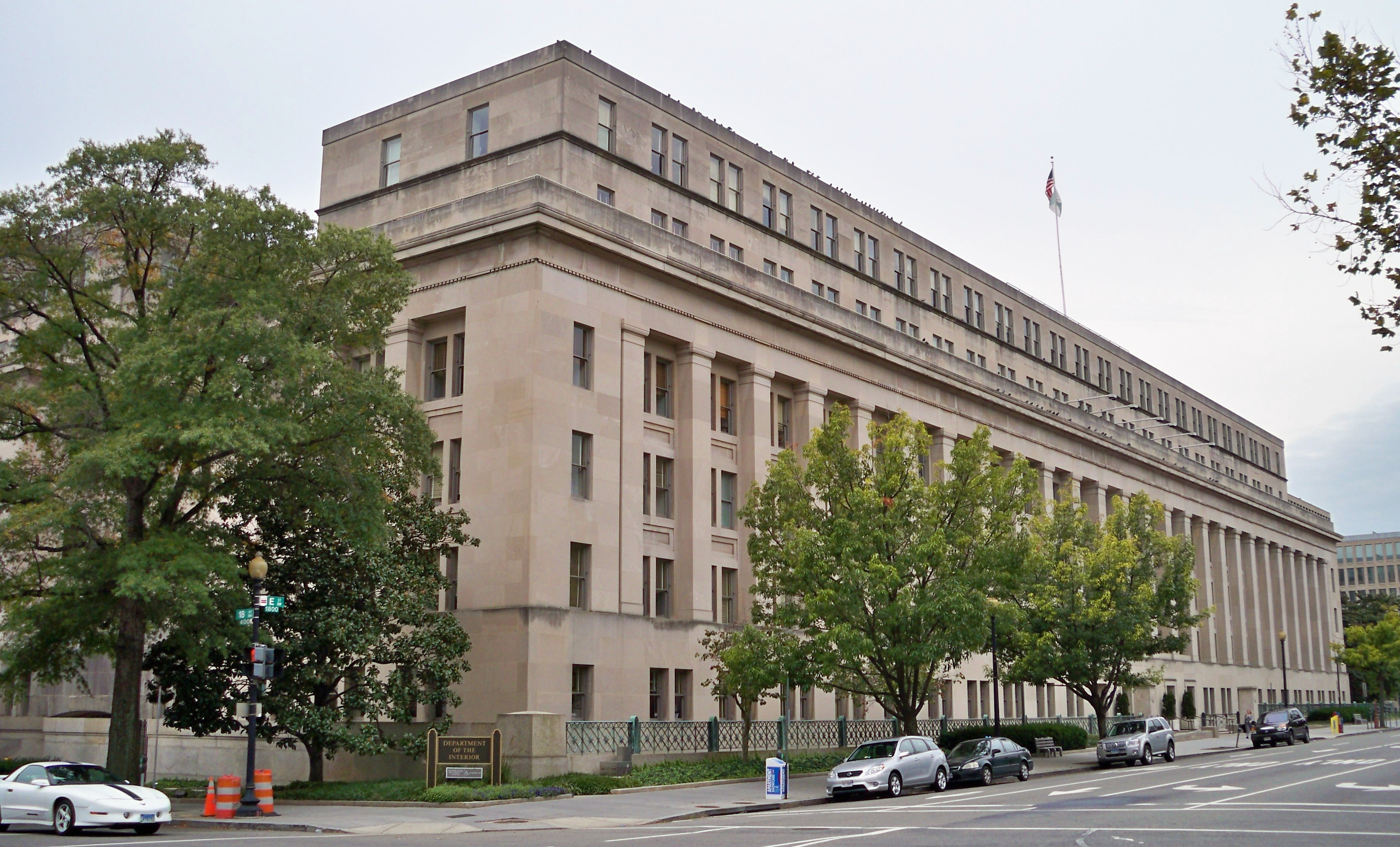
Main Interior Building, completed in 1936, is on the south side of the park

By the early 1900s, housing had developed on the park's southern border, but the northern border remained largely empty. The 1902 McMillan Plan was a master design for the city, but it included extending New York Avenue to Virginia Avenue NW where a traffic circle would be built, thereby eliminating Rawlins Park. The avenue extension did not come to fruition by the 1910s, when the area around the park saw major developments.

In 1915, the U.S. Department of the Interior began construction on a large office building, which is now the United States General Services Administration Building. As part of the construction, the park was to be improved at a cost of $3,000. Part of the changes to be made were the removal of the chain-link fencing and redesigning the park from residential to commercial usage.

Many of the city's other parks had been redesigned in order to modernize them. Landscape architect George Burnap was hired to help with the redesign. In October 1916, concrete paths that crisscross were installed so that each one led to a fountain, dedicated by the American Society of Civil Engineers in 1918 to Alfred Nobel, namesake of the Nobel Prize. Burnap was an opponent of installing equestrian statues in the middle of city parks, so the focus in his new layout of the park was the fountain. Burnap wrote: "In America, we have the horrid habit of placing an equestrian statue to some war hero or another in the exact center of every park...a park is a park and should not be made into a setting for a statue." There were additional concrete paths added and fourteen lamps were installed in the park.

In 1931, Center Market was demolished to make room for the National Archives Building, so the Rawlins statue was returned to the park. Since there was now a fountain in the center of the park, Rawlins' statue was placed on the east end. A few years later, construction began on the Department of the Interior's Main Interior Building. Just like when the previous building was being constructed, the park was redesigned once again, with new trees planted, replacement of some of the walkways, and terracing of the park. The layout of the park has not changed since that time. There was a tunnel built beneath the park that connected the two large Interior Department buildings.

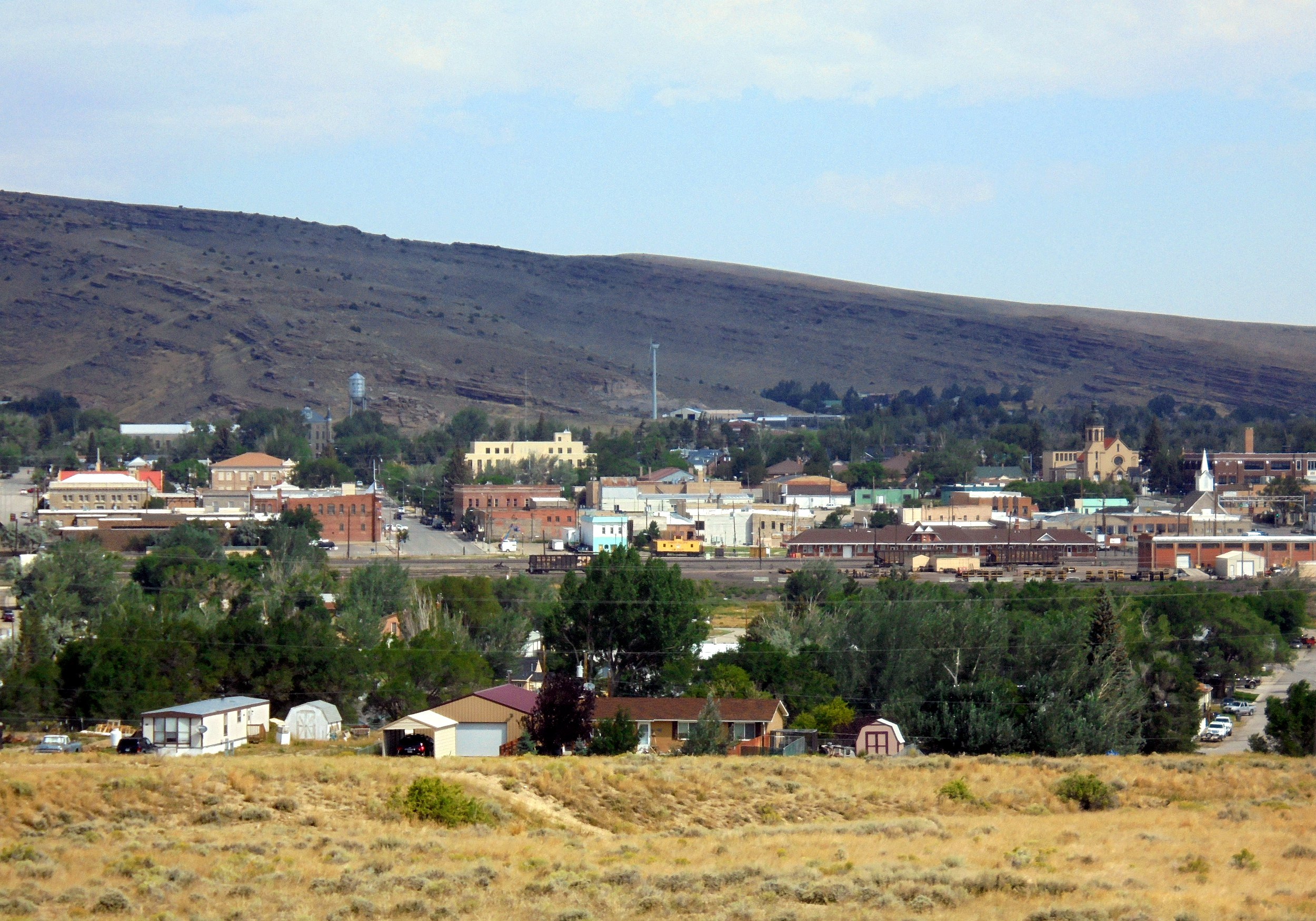
Senator Gale W. McGee attempted to have the statue of Rawlins moved to Rawlins, Wyoming, but failed to do so.

There were additional plans to build linear parks, adorned with magnolia trees, from Rawlins Park on the east to linear parks to the west, terminating at the Old Naval Observatory. The only park that was built, Walt Whitman Park, replaced an auditorium built in the 1920s. In 1940, there was another plan to extend Rawlins Park to the Old Naval Observatory, but just as before, the process did not take place.

During the 1960s, the E Street Expressway tunnel was built, which linked E Street on the west side of Walt Whitman Park to Interstate 66. As more buildings were constructed in the surrounding area, traffic became an issue. Changes made including ending New York Avenue at the park and constructing the new tunnel expressway. Another event that took place in the 1960s was the proposed removal of the statue in Washington, D.C, to Rawlins, Wyoming, which was named after the general. Wyoming Senator Gale W. McGee was the main supporter of the plan. The successful opposition to the idea came from one of Rawlins' ancestors, who asked her senators in Indiana to intercede. On November 8, 1964, Rawlins Park was included as a contributing property to the DCIHS listing of the L'Enfant Plan. The listing was later added to the NRHP on April 24, 1997.

By 1999, there were large office buildings surrounding the park, including the United Unions Building to the east, and the aforementioned buildings on the north and south sides of the park. In late 1999, the Interior Department allotted $100,000 to make much needed repairs in the park. The only surviving older residence in the park's vicinity is The Octagon House.

A 2001 article in The Washington Post noted how many times the Rawlins statue had been moved. First, when the GAR had it moved in the 1880s to an area near 7th Street and Pennsylvania Avenue NW. When a new public restroom building was constructed, the statue was moved again. The third time it was moved, it was across the street, due to construction of the National Archives Building. Its fourth and final move is when the statue was returned to Rawlins Park in 1931. As part of the United States Semiquincentennial, several parks in the city were temporarily closed by the NPS for restoration work, including $11 million in improvements to Rawlins Park. This included repairs to the fountain which had been inoperable.
