= Statue of John Aaron Rawlins =

Public statue in Washington, D.C.

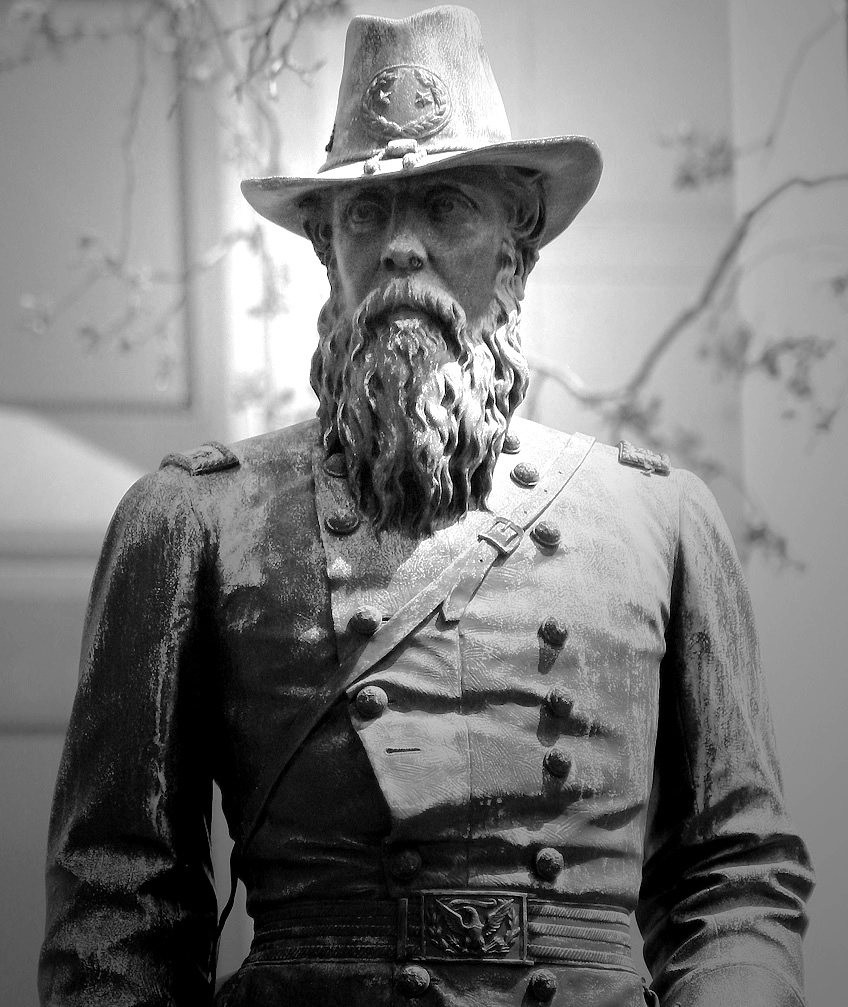
- The sculpture in 2007
- Interactive map of Statue of John Aaron Rawlins
- Location: Rawlins Park, Washington, D.C., United States
- Coordinates: 38.895833°N 77.041944°W
- Statue of John Aaron Rawlins
- U.S. National Register of Historic Places
- U.S. Historic district – Contributing property
- Part of: Civil War Monuments in Washington, D.C.
- NRHP reference No.: 78000257
- Added to NRHP: September 20, 1978
- Designer: Joseph A. Bailly (sculptor); Robert Wood & Company (founder); Westham Granite Works (fabricator)
- Material: Bronze (sculpture); Granite (base)
- Width: 4 feet (1.2 m)
- Height: 20 feet (6.1 m)
- Opening date: 1874
- Dedicated to: John Aaron Rawlins

The statue of John Aaron Rawlins, a United States Army general who served during the Civil War and later as Secretary of War, is a focal point of Rawlins Park, a small public park in Washington, D.C.'s Foggy Bottom neighborhood. It was installed in 1874, but relocated several times between 1880 and 1931. The statue was sculpted by French-American artist Joseph A. Bailly, whose best known work is the statue of George Washington in front of Independence Hall in Philadelphia.

The bronze sculpture, which rests on a granite base, is one of the city's eighteen Civil War monuments that were collectively listed on the National Register of Historic Places in 1978. The monument and park are owned and maintained by the National Park Service, a federal agency of the Interior Department. The statue is considered by historians to be one of the better portrait statues in Washington, D.C.

== History ==
=== Background ===
John Aaron Rawlins (1831–1869) was a lawyer and native of Illinois who organized the 45th Illinois Infantry for the Union Army during the Civil War. He served as a confidant and the closest advisor to General Ulysses S. Grant during the war and served as Grant's Secretary of War after Grant was elected president of the United States. Rawlins died of tuberculosis five months into his term as secretary. During his short term in office, Rawlins spoke passionately about the plight of recently freed slaves and tried to protect Native Americans from military officers who were cruel to them. He also tried to protect Grant from men who would "lead him away from the straight and true." One of Rawlins' colleagues said "he had blunt, wrathful words of objurgation for those who put in Grant's way temptations that he knew to be dangerous."

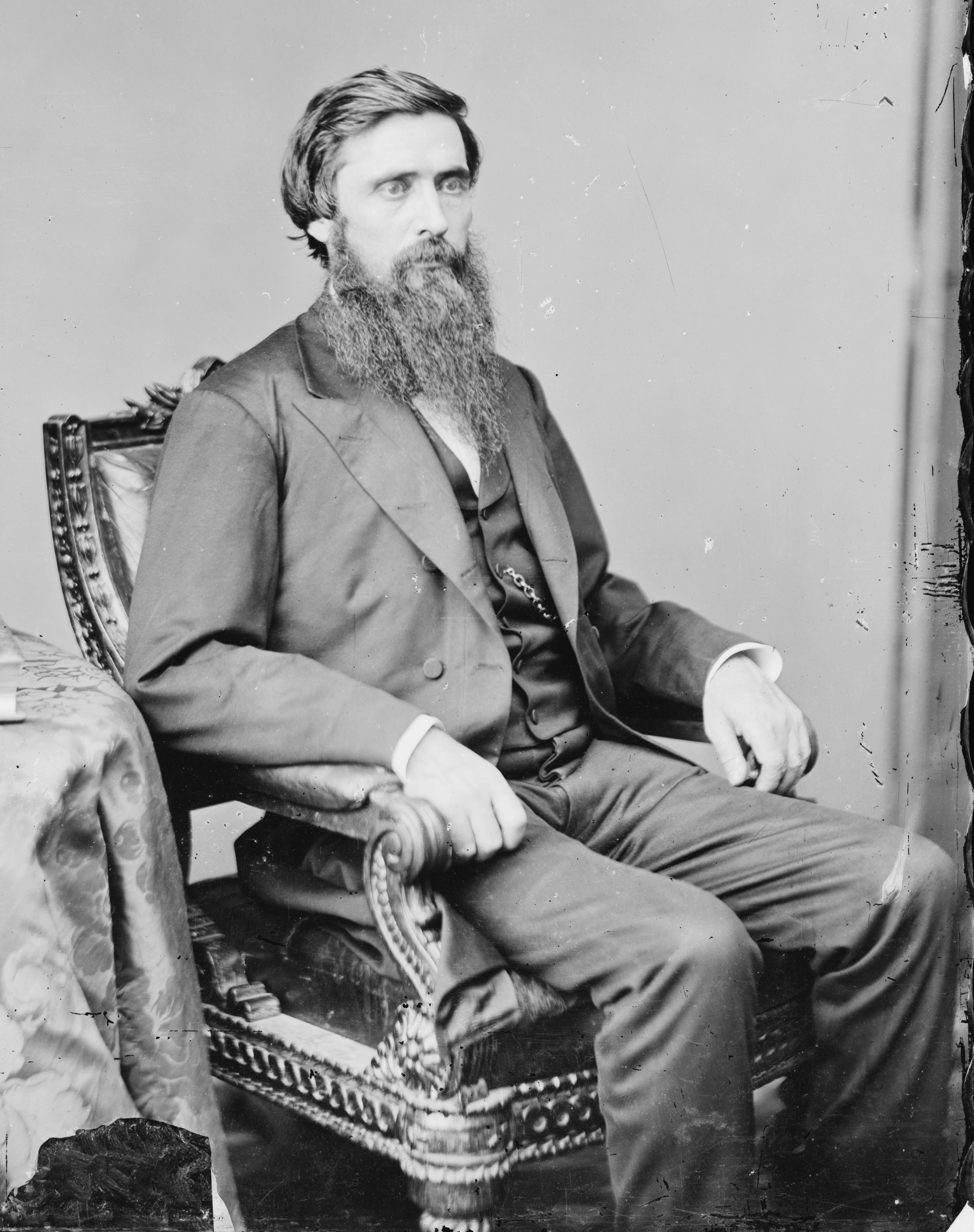
John Aaron Rawlins

Soon after Rawlins' death in 1869, efforts were under way to erect a statue honoring him. Interest in the project waned until 1872 when Grant wrote a letter to Congress to address the delay. On June 10, 1872, a congressional bill sponsored by Illinois Senator John A. Logan, who had served under Grant and admired Rawlins, was approved with $10,000 appropriated for the erection of the statue. The legislation included instructions for a committee to be created that would solicit models and select an artist. The committee consisted of General Orville E. Babcock, Architect of the Capitol Edward Clark, and Librarian of Congress Ainsworth Rand Spofford. Sculptors that submitted designs included Theophilus Fisk Mills, son of Clark Mills, and Lot Flannery, sculptor of the 1868 Abraham Lincoln statue. The artist chosen was Joseph A. Bailly (1825–1883), a French-born American sculptor whose best known work is the 1869 statue of George Washington in Philadelphia. Bailly's other works in Washington, D.C., include sculptures of Benjamin Hallowell and Alexander "Boss" Shepherd. The statue was founded by Robert Wood & Company. The bronze used for the statue was cast from Confederate cannons captured during the Civil War.

The total cost of the statue and its installation was $13,000. The original planned site for the statue was Franklin Square, though the site where it was installed was Rawlins Park, a small park in what was then an unkept and remote area. There was no formal dedication ceremony when it was installed in November 1874. The following year, the statue was placed atop a granite base constructed by the Westham Granite Company of Richmond, Virginia.

=== Later history ===
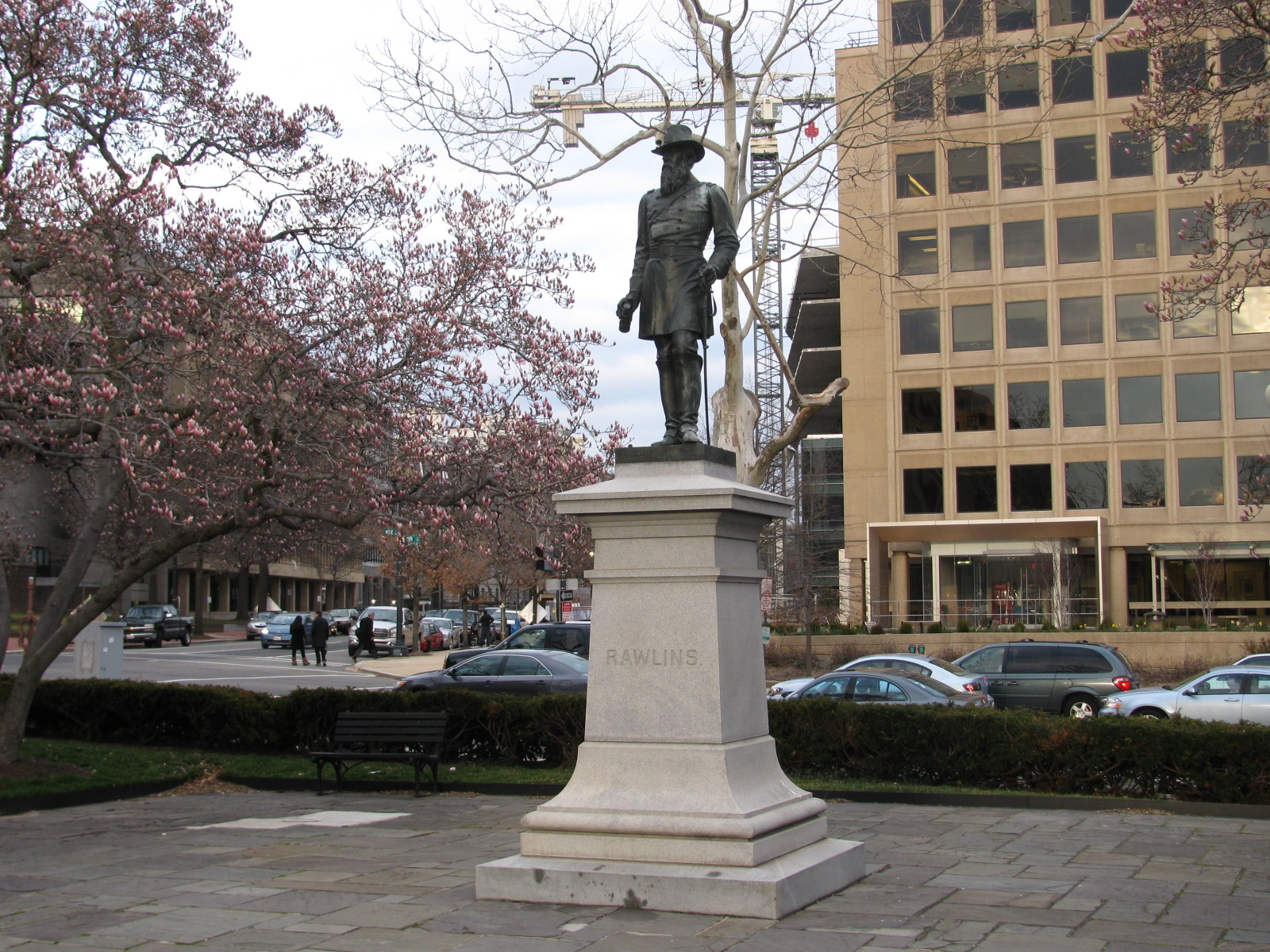
The sculpture in 2013

In 1880, members of the Grand Army of the Republic visited the statue and were dismayed by the park and its surroundings. They petitioned to have the statue moved to a more prominent location, 10th and D Streets NW, where it stood until a newspaper plant was built on that site. It was then moved to the north side of Pennsylvania Avenue between 7th Street and 9th Street NW, but a public restroom was built on the site in 1886 and the statue was moved across the street. In 1931, construction began on the National Archives Building and the statue was moved for the last time to its original location, Rawlins Park. Rawlins Park was greatly improved with the addition of walkways and a reflecting pool in 1938. In 1963, Wyoming Representative William H. Harrison unsuccessfully attempted to have the statue moved to Rawlins, a town named after the general.

The statue is one of eighteen Civil War monuments in Washington, D.C. that were collectively listed on the National Register of Historic Places on September 20, 1978, and the District of Columbia Inventory of Historic Sites on March 3, 1979. It is one of the few Civil War monuments that is a not an equestrian sculpture. The others are the Dupont Circle Fountain, Stephenson Grand Army of the Republic Memorial, Nuns of the Battlefield, the Peace Monument, and statues of Admiral David G. Farragut and CSA Brigadier General Albert Pike. (The Pike statue was toppled by protesters on June 19, 2020.) The statue and surrounding park are owned and maintained by the National Park Service, a federal agency of the Interior Department. Historian James M. Goode, author of Outdoor Sculpture of Washington, D.C., considers it one of the better portrait statues in Washington, D.C., and thinks the statue has a "certain elegance and spirit."

== Design and location ==
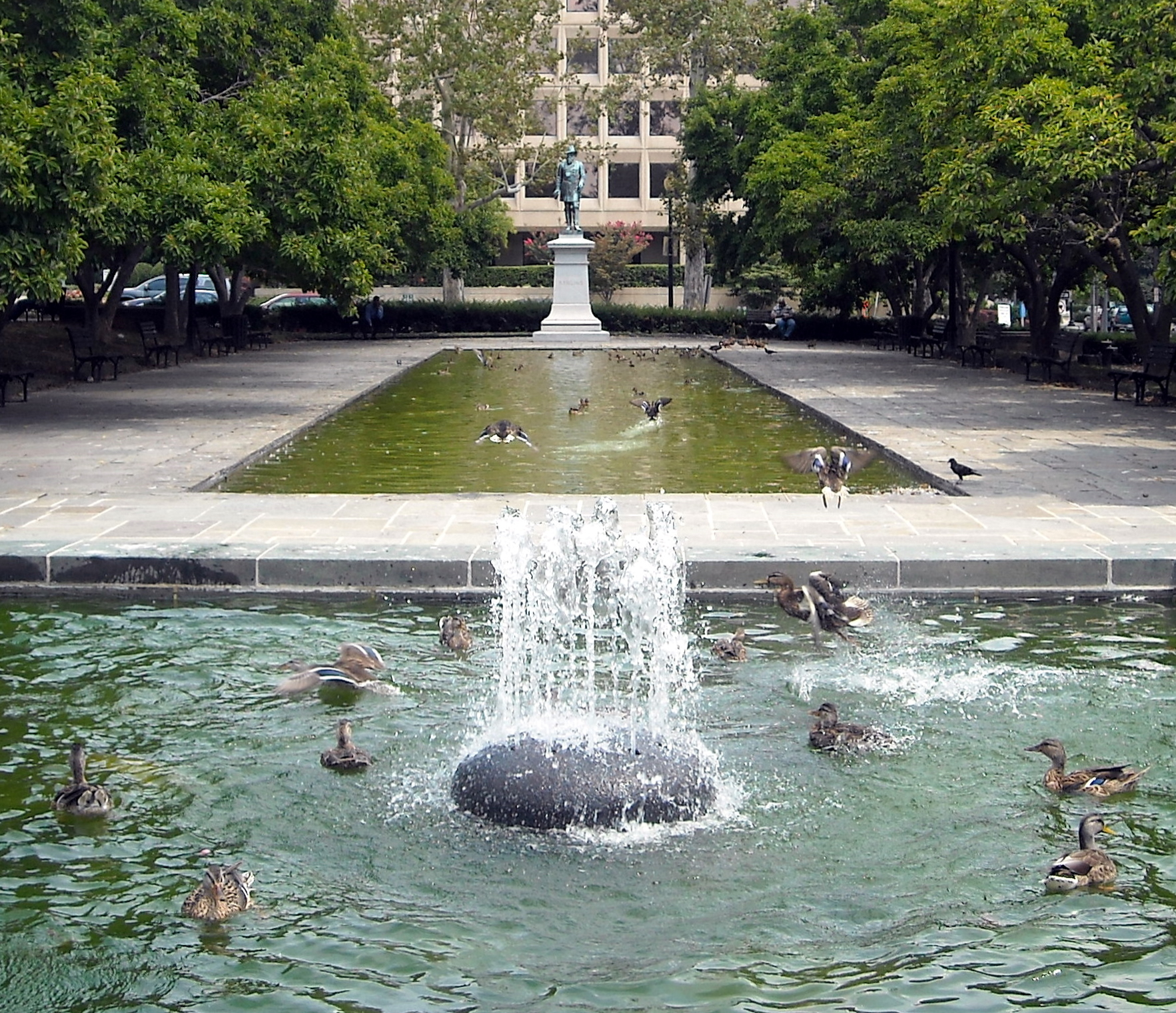
The statue in Rawlins Park, 2008

The statue is sited on the eastern end of Rawlins Park, a small public park located between 18th Street, 19th Street, E Street and New York Avenue NW in the Foggy Bottom neighborhood of Washington, D.C. The Main Interior Building lies to the south of the park, General Services Administration Building is on the north side of the park, and The Octagon House is on the northeast corner of the park.

The bronze statue measures 8 ft (2.4 m) tall and the light gray, pedestal-style granite base measures 12 ft (3.7 m) high and 4 ft (1.2 m) wide. The statue depicts Rawlins standing while wearing his Civil War military uniform: a hat, long belted jacket, tall boots, and gloves. His left leg is slightly forward and his right hand is holding a pair of field glasses by his side. He left hand is holding the sword handle which rests at his side. Rawlins is depicted with a beard and moustache. The inscription "RAWLINS" is on the front of the base. The inscriptions "R. WOOD & CO / BRONZE FOUNDERS / PHILA" and "A. BAILLY, sculpt / 1873" are on the sculpture.

== See also ==
- List of public art in Washington, D.C., Ward 2
- Outdoor sculpture in Washington, D.C.
