= George Washington on Horseback =

Equestrian statue by Herbert Haseltine in Washington, D.C., U.S.

Coordinates: 38°55′46.3″N 77°4′12.5″W

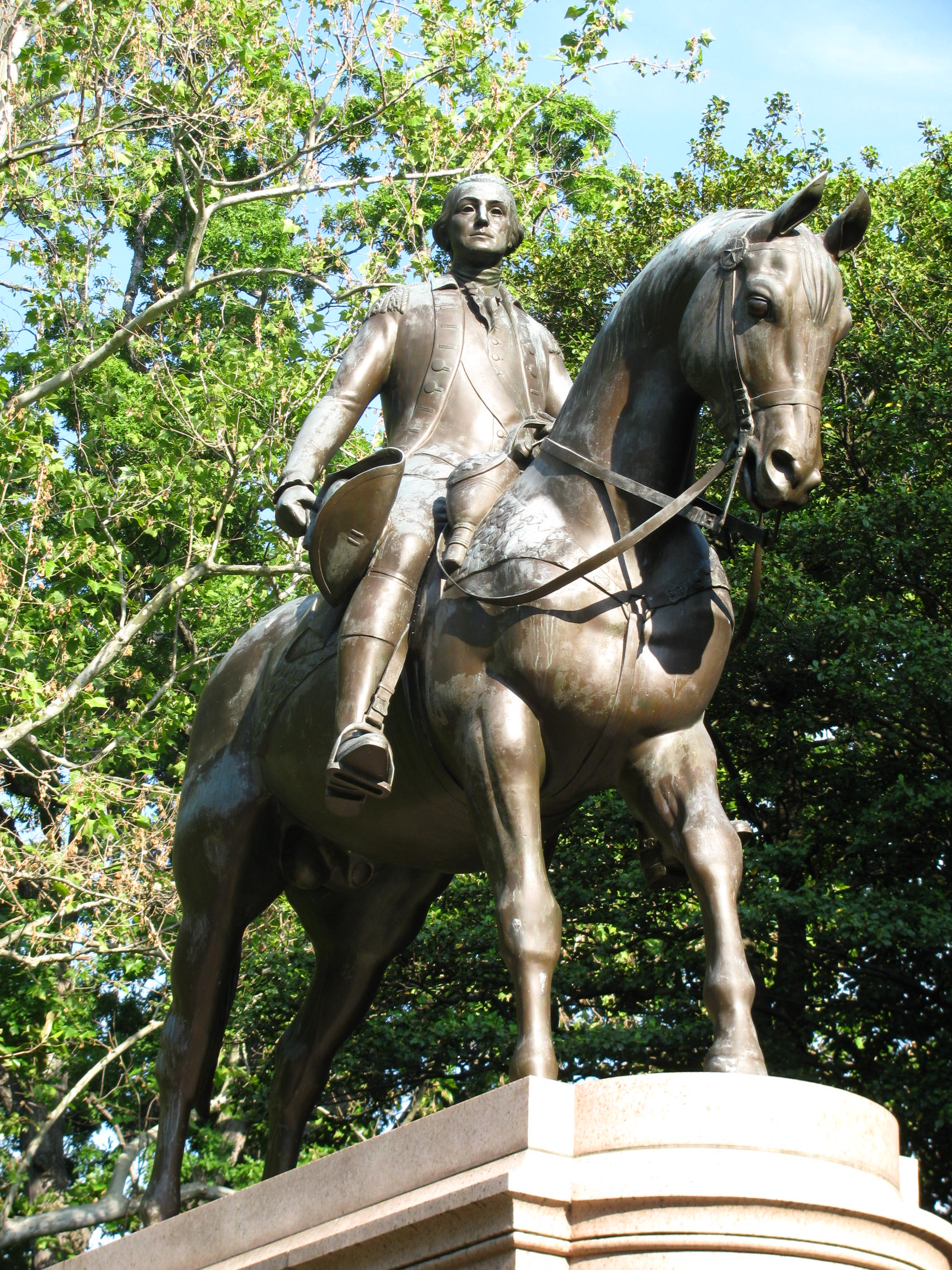
- Sculpture in 2012
- Artist: Herbert Heseltine
- Year: 1959
- Medium: bronze
- Dimensions: 200 cm × 380 cm × 170 cm (78 in × 150 in × 66 in)
- Location: Washington, D.C.

George Washington on Horseback is an equestrian statue by sculptor Herbert Haseltine. It is located south of the Washington National Cathedral.

It was dedicated on February 22, 1959.

== See also ==
- List of monuments dedicated to George Washington
- List of statues of George Washington
- List of sculptures of presidents of the United States
