= Washington Crossing Monument =

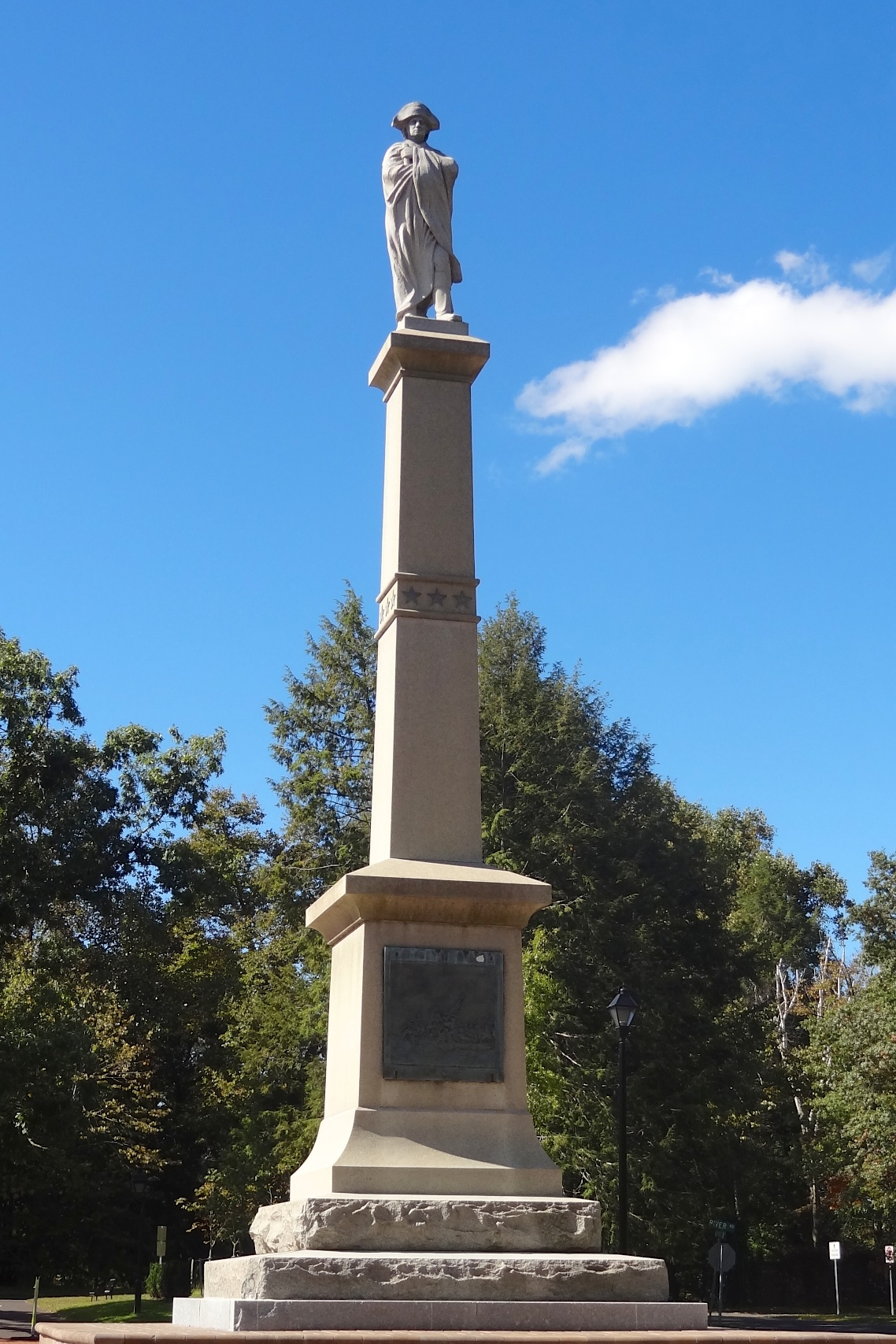
- Year: 1916
- Medium: Granite
- Subject: George Washington, George Washington's crossing of the Delaware River
- Location: Washington Crossing Historic Park; Washington Crossing, Pennsylvania, United States; 40°17′45.1″N 74°52′19.9″W

The Washington Crossing Monument is a 35-foot (11 m) obelisk located in Washington Crossing Historic Park in Washington Crossing, Pennsylvania, United States. A granite statue of George Washington is atop the monument, commemorating his crossing of the Delaware River during the American Revolutionary War. It was created by the Pennsylvania chapter of the Patriotic Order Sons of America and was dedicated on May 27, 1916.

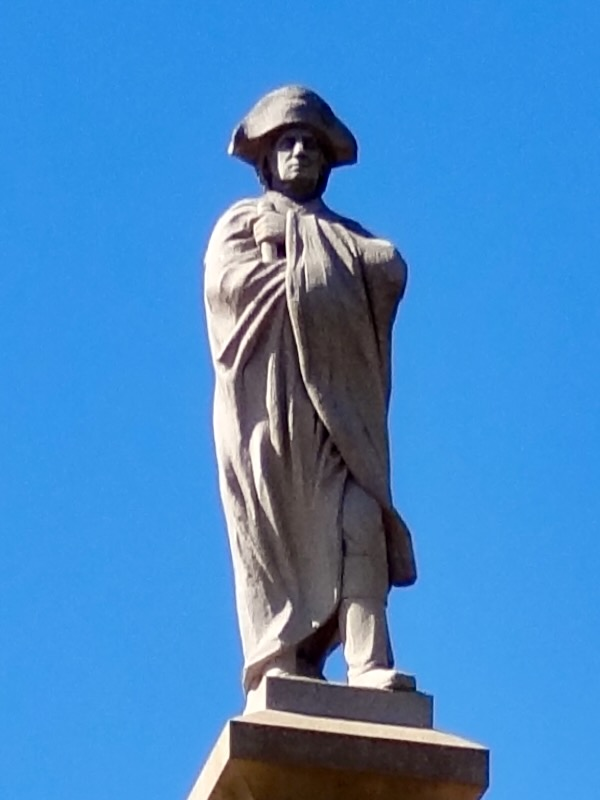
Statue of George Washington atop the monument

== See also ==
- List of memorials to George Washington
- List of statues of George Washington
