= Statue of George Washington, Mexico City (1916) =

Statue erected in 1916 in Mexico City, Mexico

Coordinates: 19.4198°N 99.2014°W

A statue of George Washington stands in Mexico City. It was presented as a gift to the city by the United States government in 1916.

Since 1970, it has been located in the Parque Rosario Castellanos.

An earlier sculpture of Washington by Pompeo Coppini in the same city was destroyed in 1914.

== See also ==
- List of statues of George Washington
- List of sculptures of presidents of the United States
