= Walt Whitman Park (Washington, D.C.) =

Park in Washington, D.C., U.S.

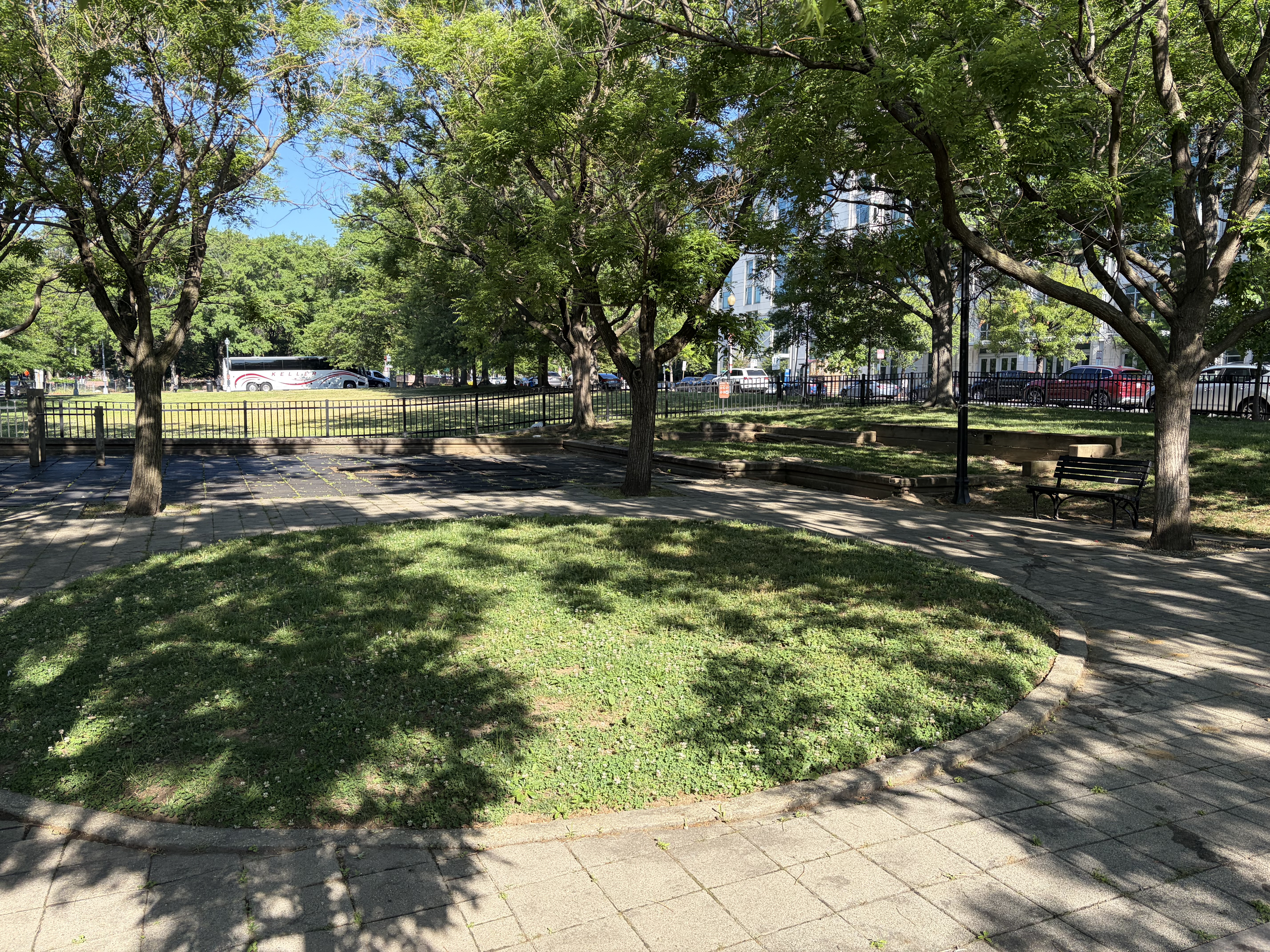
- Walt Whitman Park in 2026

- Location within Central Washington, D.C.
- Location: Washington, D.C., U.S.
- Coordinates: 38°53′44.5″N 77°2′39″W
- Operator: National Park Service

Walt Whitman Park is a small federal park in Washington, D.C., United States. Located on E Street between 19th and 20th Streets N.W. in the Foggy Bottom neighborhood, it has been named for the poet Walt Whitman since 1966 and is considered a potential spot for future memorials and monuments in the nation's capital.

== Description and location ==
Walt Whitman Park occupies 1 acre (0.40 ha) on a block bounded on the north and south by E Street's westbound and eastbound lanes, respectively, and on the west by 20th Street and the east by 19th Street. Across 19th Street to the east is Rawlins Park, while the E Street Expressway terminates opposite 20th Street on the west side. Directly south of the park is the United States Office of Personnel Management. North of the park is the Elliott School of International Affairs building of George Washington University.

The park consists of a lawn and a fenced-in area that once housed a playground. A in-ground plaque featuring a quotation from Whitman is included in the park.

== History ==
The park, designated as Reservation 715, was part of a broader green area called the Little Mall. It was named for Whitman in 1966. As part of Lady Bird Johnson's capital beautification program, landscape architect Edward Durell Stone Jr. created a design for the park in the late 1960s with trees, walkways and pools that would be consistent with the design of adjacent Rawkins Park. While Stone's plan was approved by the agencies with jurisdiction, it was not constructed due to a lack of funding.

A $320,000 (equivalent to $788,589 in 2025) playground was installed in 1990 primarily to serve children in child care centers in nearby federal office buildings, although it was also open to the public. It was the first time the U.S. government had installed a playground on federal land for children of government workers. The playground was later removed.

=== Future plans ===
Whitman Park has often been discussed as a site for a planned memorial. It was considered but rejected as a potential site for the Dwight D. Eisenhower Memorial, the planned Global War on Terrorism Memorial, a planned memorial for the Texas Legation and the planned Fallen Journalists Memorial. In the 2010s, the National Capital Planning Commission also identified the park as a potential site for the National Desert Storm and Desert Shield Memorial and a potential site for memorials related to international coordination and diplomacy due to its proximity to the U.S. State Department headquarters.
