= Statue of George Washington (Philadelphia) =

Statue of George Washington, by Joseph A. Bailly

George Washington
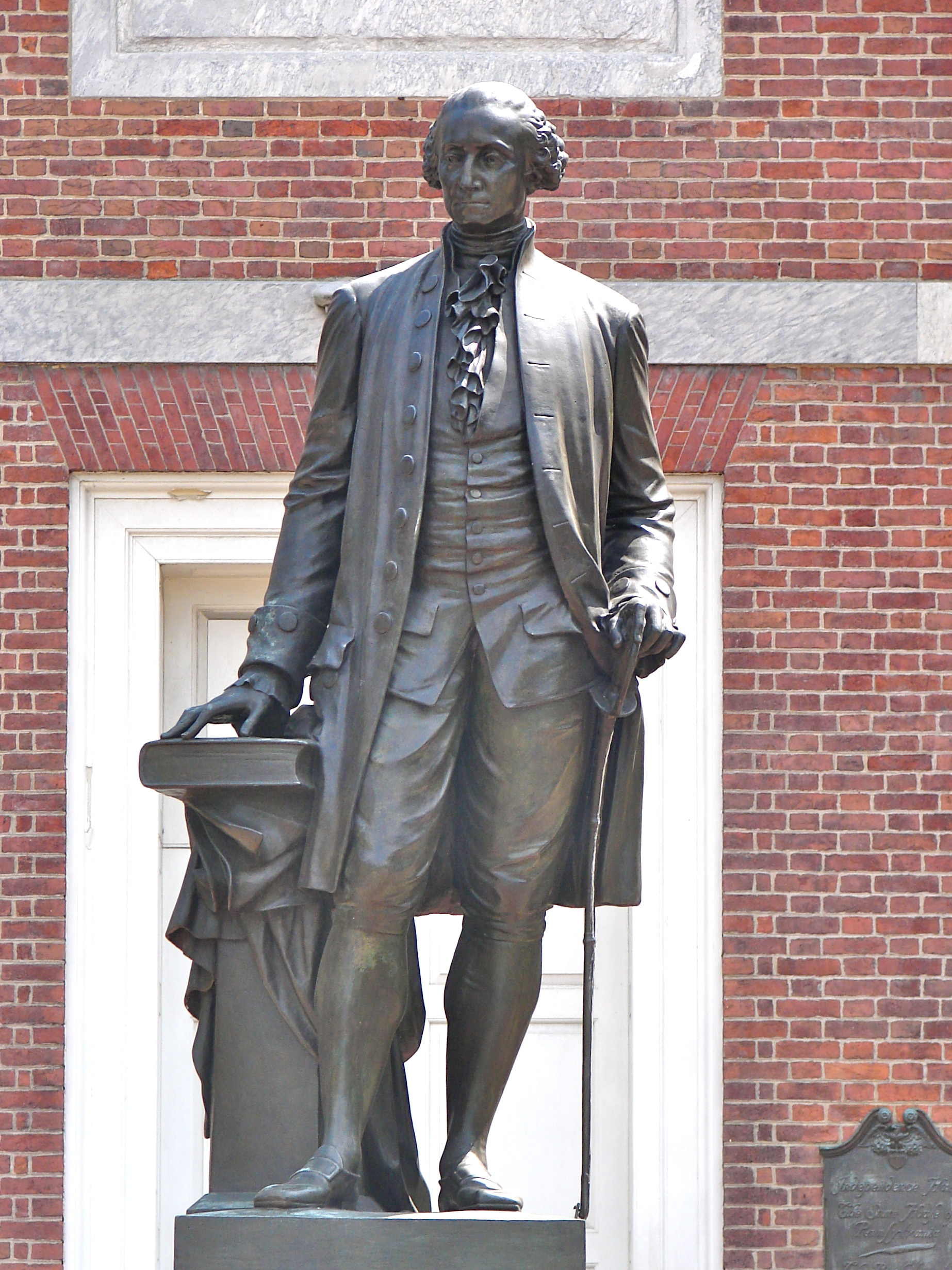
- The statue in 2011
- Interactive map of George Washington
- Location: Independence Hall, Philadelphia, Pennsylvania, United States
- Coordinates: 39.94899°N 75.15001°W
- Designer: Joseph A. Bailly
- Material: Bronze
- Length: 79 centimetres (31 in)
- Width: 79 centimetres (31 in)
- Height: 260 centimetres (100 in)
- Dedicated date: 1869 (marble original); 1910 (bronze reproduction)
- Dedicated to: George Washington

George Washington is a statue of United States President George Washington. Created by Joseph A. Bailly, it is located at Independence Hall, Philadelphia on Chestnut street between 5th and 6th streets.

== History and notable features ==
The white marble original of this statue, which was installed on the north side of Independence Hall, was dedicated on July 2, 1869, by mayor Daniel M. Fox. It is now located in Conversation Hall, Philadelphia City Hall.

A bronze replica replaced the original. Sculpted by Joseph Alexis Bailly (1825-1883), it stands approximately eight feet, six inches tall and was cast circa 1910 by the Roman Bronze Works, fabricated by P. Reinhalter & Company, and was then dedicated in October 1910. It sits on a base that is approximately six feet, eight inches tall that was made from marble and granite supplied by the Richmond Granite Company.

== See also ==
- Cultural depictions of George Washington
- List of monuments dedicated to George Washington
- List of statues of George Washington
- List of public art in Philadelphia
- List of sculptures of presidents of the United States

== Gallery ==
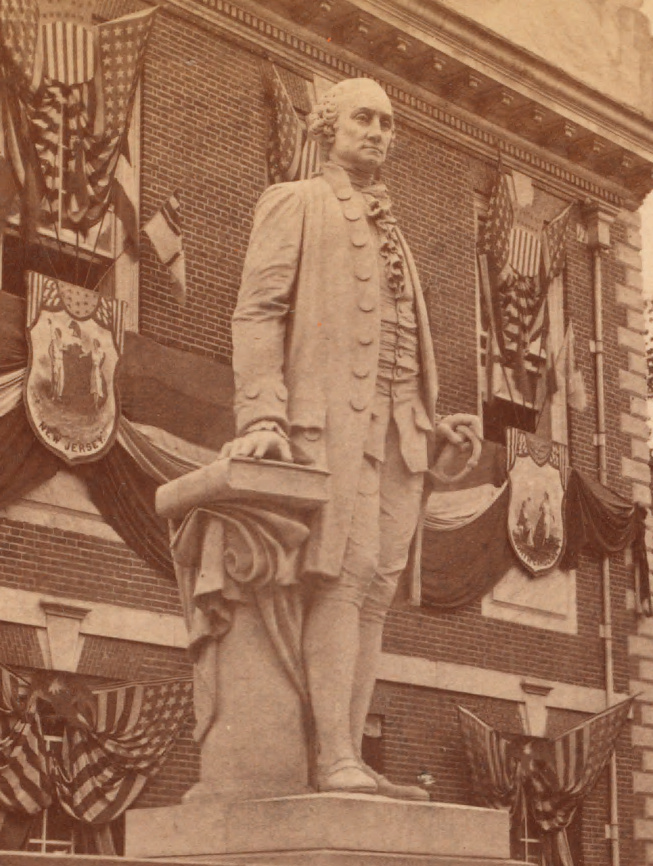
The marble original, circa 1890s
