= Herbert Haseltine =

French-American sculptor

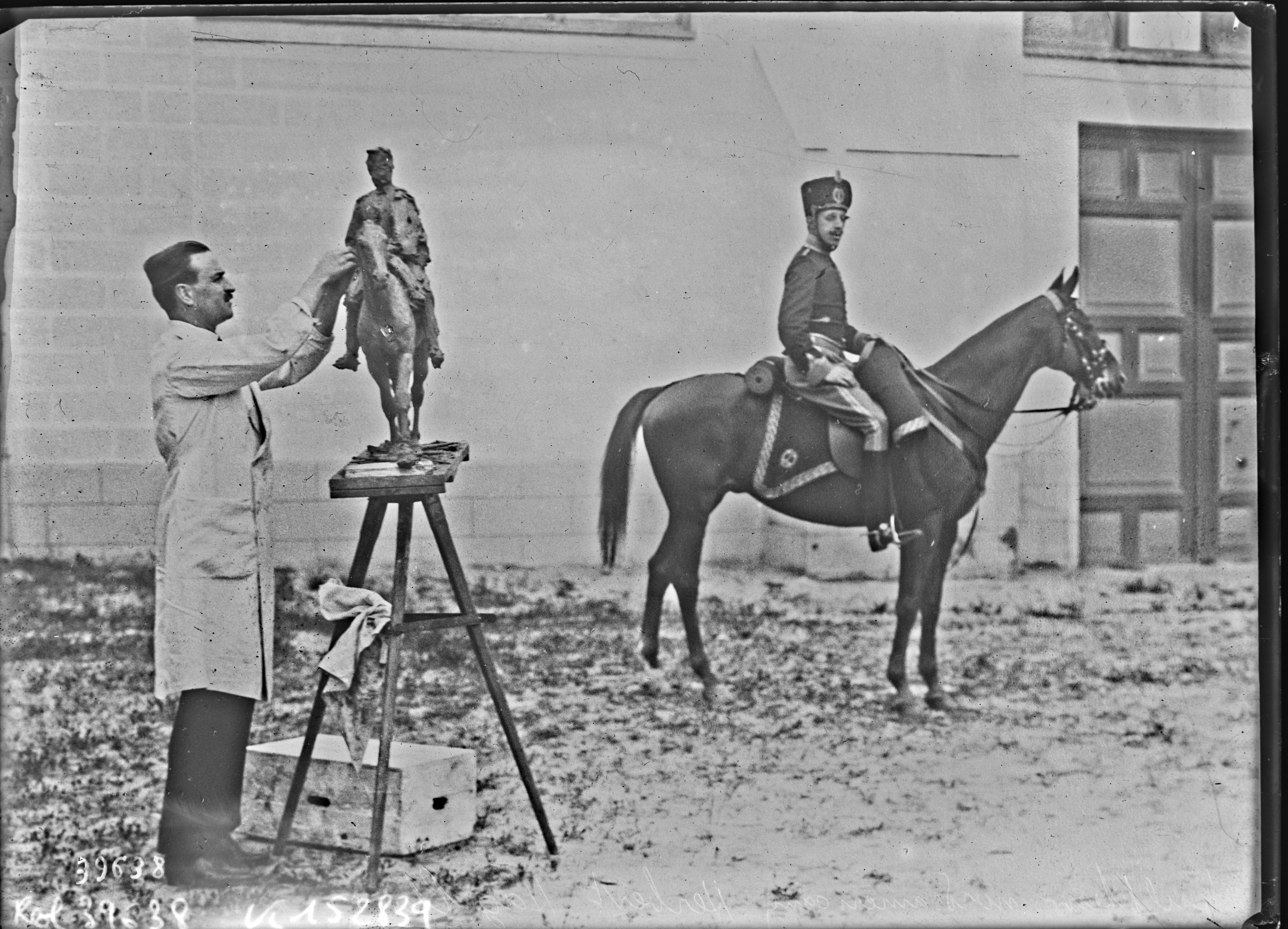
- Haseltine (left) and a model, 1914
- Born: 1877; Rome, Italy
- Died: 1962 (aged 84–85); Paris, France
- Occupations: sculptor, equestrian sculptor

Herbert Chevalier Haseltine (1877–1962) was an Italian-born French/American animalier sculptor, most known as an Equestrian sculptor.

== Early life and education ==
Haseltine was born in Rome, the son of the American landscape painter William Stanley Haseltine (1835–1900) who was associated with the Hudson River School and Luminism. He studied at Harvard University and, after graduating in 1899, Haseltine attended Munich Academy in Germany to study drawing and then to the Académie Julian in Paris, France where he studied painting.

== Career ==
After his first piece of sculpture met with success, he pursued that artistic avenue. Inspired by the gathering of artists from around the world to the Montparnasse Quarter of Paris, Haseltine chose to make Paris his home for the next thirty-five years until the German occupation of France during World War II. He moved to the United States where he remained until 1947, at which time he returned to France.

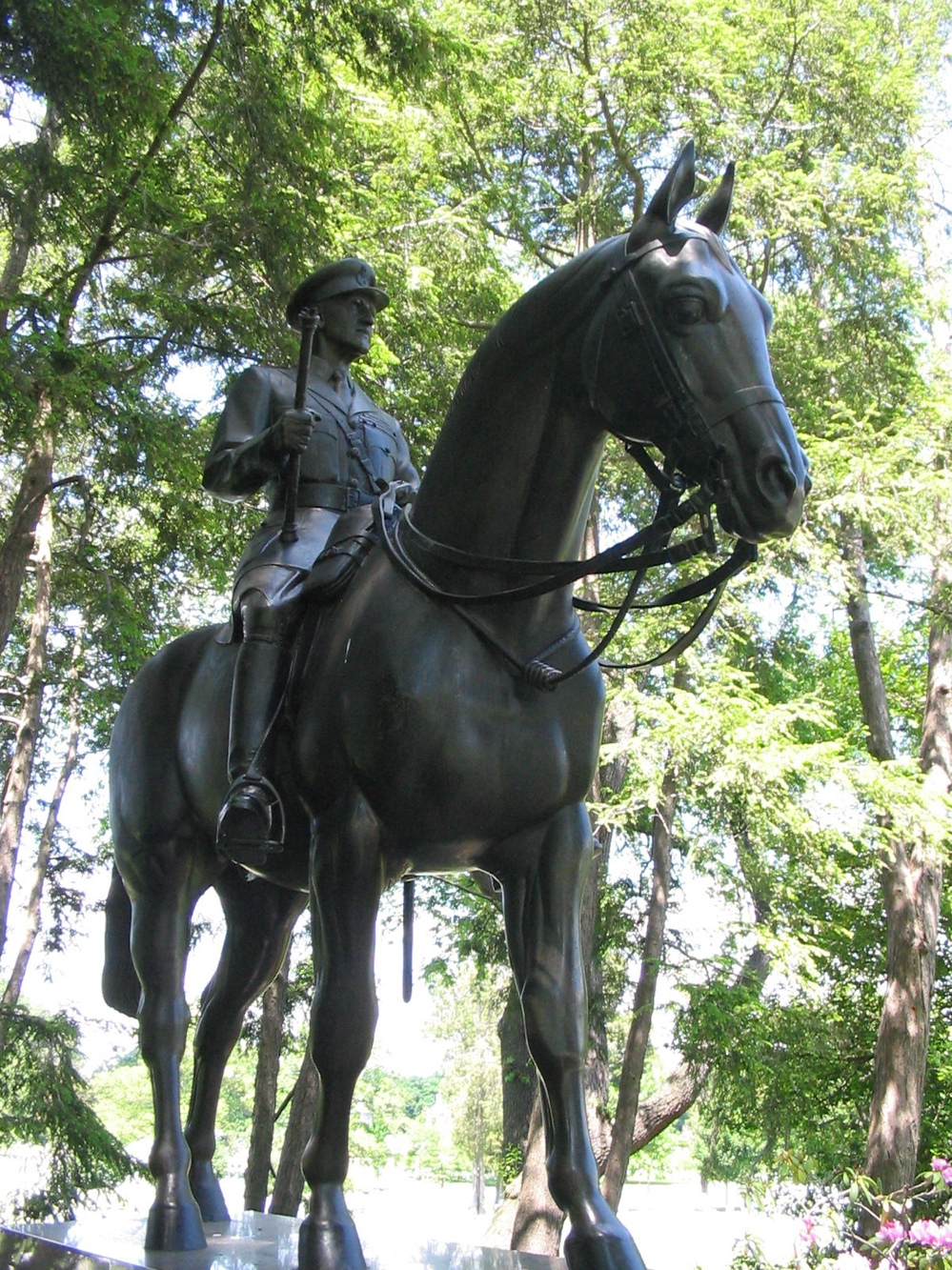
Equestrian statue of Sir John Dill statue at Arlington National Cemetery by Haseltine.

In 1940, he was elected to the National Academy of Design as an Associate member and became a full Academician in 1946.

Haseltine sculpted a variety of animals but is best known for his equestrian sculptures, most notably the 1934 life-size statue of the thoroughbred race horse Man o' War at the Kentucky Horse Park in Lexington, Kentucky and "George Washington on Horseback", Gilded bronze statue at the Washington National Cathedral made in 1959. He also traveled to India, where he made an oversized statue of one of the ancestors of the Maharaja of Nawanagar, Jam Shri Rawalji in 1933. It can still be seen there. He replicated many of his large works in table-top sizes. The author of a number of books on animalier art, Haseltine was well connected in American upper class society and did a three-year project to create a work for heiress Barbara Hutton. This project included two horses heads which were gilded bronze, with precious and semi-precious stones. After her death the heads disappeared and resurfaced a few years ago at an auction in New York.

== Personal life ==
During the time he lived in Paris at the Impasse Raffet (XVIeme Quartier) near the Rue Jasmin, accomplished many things. Attached to American Embassy, Paris, 1914–1915, Decorated Chevalier Legion of Honor in 1922, he entertained a lot of guests in his house, which was once depicted in the French Magazine "Maison & Jardin". Amongst his guests were Arthur Rubinstein, Cary Grant, Teddy Roosevelt Jr and Charles Lindbergh. He also had many contacts to highest Russian Royalty. His wife, the former Madeleine Keith, was born in England and died in 1979 in Paris. The house was subsequently sold to the owner of Paris Match. His daughter Helen Heather Haseltine married an Austrian Count by the name of Paul Maria Prosper Toggenburg (b. 09-04-1904 in Trento, d.02-07-1964 in Ritten, Trentino-Südtirol, Italy) so becoming Gräfin Toggenburg, her descendants live in Italy and Austria now. By his son, William Marshall, he has two grandchildren, of which one, Carla, is a well-respected sculptor in her own right.

Herbert Haseltine died in Paris, in 1962. He was buried at the Protestant Cemetery Caius Cestius in Rome, where are also the graves of his parents, of his brothers Stanley Lane, Charles Marshall and his sister Mildred princess Rospigliosi.
