= Joseph A. Bailly =

American sculptor

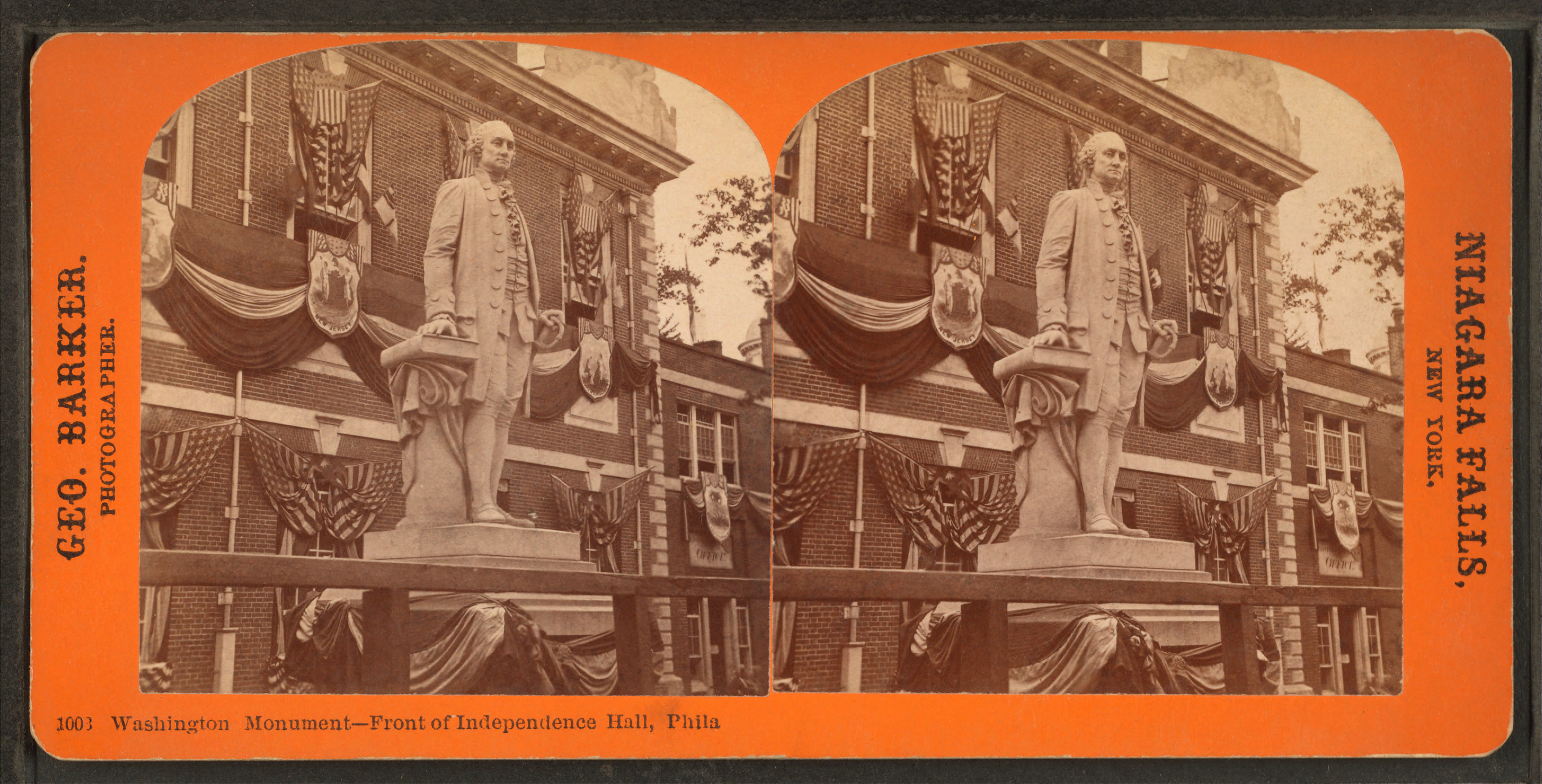
George Washington (1869), Independence Hall, Philadelphia, Pennsylvania. This was replaced by a bronze replica in 1910; the marble original is on display at Philadelphia City Hall.

Joseph Alexis Bailly (January 21, 1823 or 1825 – June 15, 1883) was a French-born American sculptor who spent most of his career in Philadelphia. He taught briefly at the Pennsylvania Academy of the Fine Arts, which has a collection of his sculpture. His most famous work is the statue of George Washington in front of Independence Hall.

== Biography ==
The son of a Parisian cabinetmaker, Bailly attended the École des Beaux-Arts before being drafted into the French Army during the Revolution of 1848. He assaulted an officer, deserted, and fled to England where he studied briefly under the sculptor Edward Hodges Baily. After traveling to the United States and Argentina, he settled in Philadelphia in 1850.

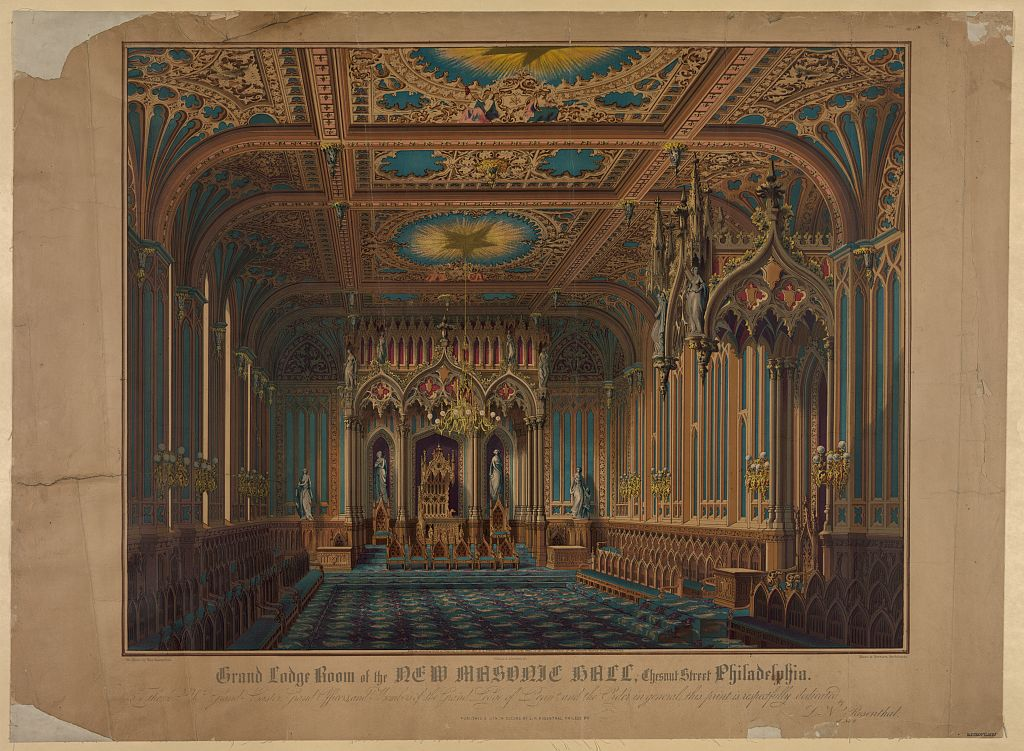
"Grand Lodge Room of the New Masonic Hall, Chestnut Street, Philadelphia." (1855, burned 1886)

Bailly worked as a furniture carver before establishing a sculpture studio with Charles Bushor in 1854. Their first major commission was for the interior ornament and furniture of the New Masonic Hall at 713-21 Chestnut Street in Philadelphia (1855, burned 1886). This included six life-sized painted-wood statues illustrating the female Masonic virtues. (The statues and furniture were moved to the current Philadelphia Masonic Temple at Broad & Filbert Streets, when it opened in 1873.) That was followed by the commission for the interior ornament of Philadelphia's opera house, the Academy of Music (1855–57).

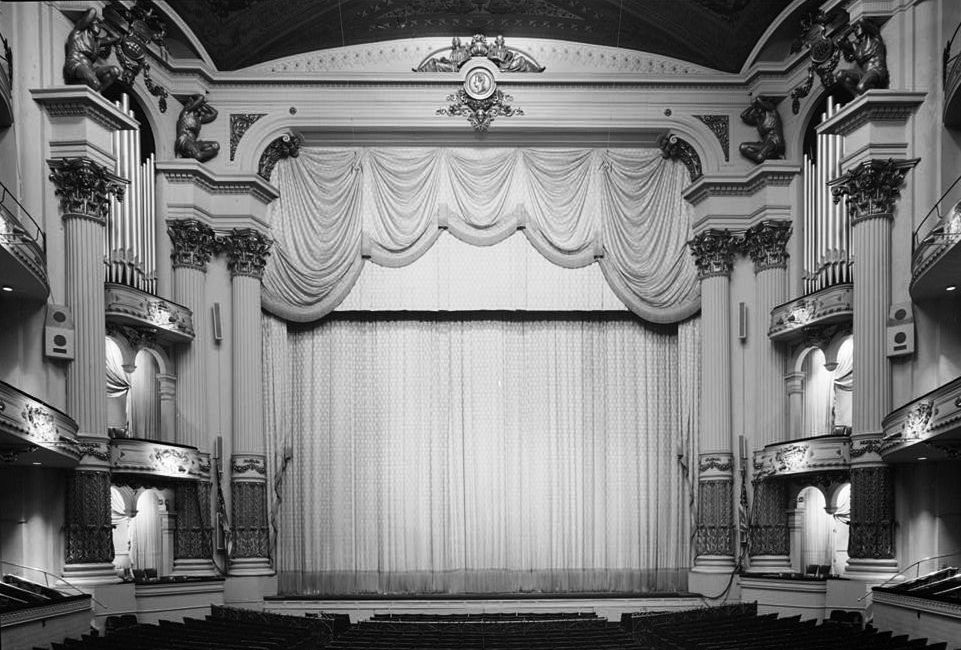
Academy of Music in Philadelphia, Pennsylvania (1855-57). The cameo bust over the proscenium is of Mozart, with the goddesses of Music and Poetry above; giant atlantes appear to hold up the ceiling.

At the United States Capitol, Bailly designed the Monumental Clock for the United States House of Representatives Chamber (1858) and carved its wooden case. Sculptor William Henry Rinehart designed the flanking bronze figures of the Backwoodsman and the Indian. Furniture makers Bembe & Kimbel manufactured the clock, and gilded the whole piece. It was removed from the House Chamber in 1950, and is now on display in the Capitol's Crypt.

One of his most accomplished works is the marble sculpture group Paradise Lost (1863–68), depicting Adam and Eve ruminating on their expulsion from the Garden of Eden. Its companion piece, First Prayer (1864–68), shows Eve teaching their small children, Cain and Abel. Both works were commissioned by Henry C. Gibson, and are at the Pennsylvania Academy of the Fine Arts.

His giant marble of Benjamin Franklin (1868) was installed on the corner of the Public Ledger Building's facade and, 250 feet away, his marble statue of George Washington (1869) stood before Independence Hall. Bailly carved a number of funerary memorials, including that of the artist William Emlen Cresson (1869), at Laurel Hill Cemetery, which showed the young painter holding his brush and palette (now missing). In the 1870s, the United States Mint in Philadelphia commissioned him to carve coin dies for U.S. Trade Dollars — coins with a higher silver content than regular U.S. silver dollars for use in international trade, especially with China, Japan and Korea. The surviving coin dies are unsigned, but design and/or carving of at least three of them are attributed to Bailly.

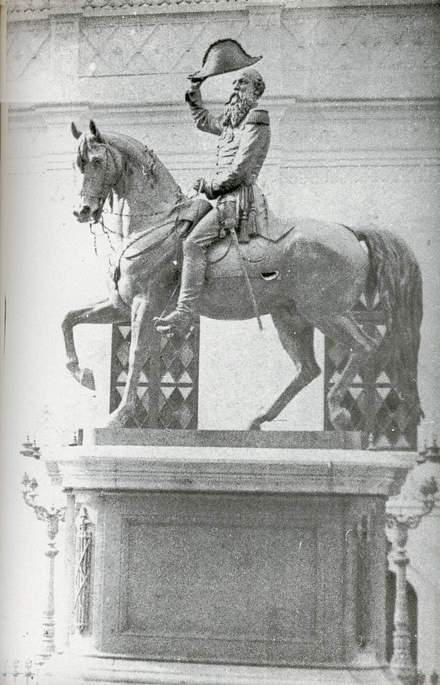
Equestrian statue of President Antonio Guzmán Blanco (1875-79), bronze, installed in Caracas, Venezuela in 1880.

He exhibited at the Pennsylvania Academy of the Fine Arts beginning in 1851, was elected an Academician by PAFA in 1860, and taught there during the American Civil War. Hired to teach at PAFA in 1876, he resigned two years later in a salary dispute, and Thomas Eakins took over his modeling class.

Among his students were Howard Roberts, John J. Boyle, and Alexander Milne Calder (whose submission for the colossal statue of William Penn atop Philadelphia City Hall was selected over Bailly's). He exhibited several works at the 1876 Centennial Exposition, including the plaster model for an equestrian statue of Venezuela's president, Antonio Guzmán Blanco.

Bailly died in Philadelphia in 1883. he was buried at Mount Peace Cemetery. Philadelphia newspaper The Times published an obituary:

Death of the Sculptor Bailly.

Joseph A. Bailly, the well-known sculptor, died on Friday at his residence, at the corner of Hutton and Preston streets. He was born in Paris, January 21, 1825, and came to this country shortly after the revolution of 1848. He has been a resident of Philadelphia for many years, and his memory will be preserved by many public statues here and elsewhere. Among these may be mentioned the figure of Franklin made for the market house on Tenth street and now in front of the Ledger building; the Washington in front of Independence Hall; the statue of Witherspoon in the Park, and the emblematic figure pointing to the clock on Bailey's old store, on Chestnut Street, above Eighth. This was one of his first statues, most of his previous work having been confined to architectural decoration, as in the fine caryatides on the procenium of the Academy of Music. Still larger works elsewhere are the equestrian statue of General Rawlins, at Washington, and that of General Blanco, ex-President of Venezuela, at Caraccas. He was a rapid worker and may be said to have won success in his profession, and among the very small number of resident sculptors he will be missed.

== Sculptures ==
=== Major works ===
- Beauty, Wisdom, Faith, Hope, Charity, Strength (1855), painted wood, Philadelphia Masonic Temple
- Paradise Lost (1863–68), marble, Pennsylvania Academy of the Fine Arts, Philadelphia. Commissioned by Henry C. Gibson
- First Prayer (1864–68), marble, Pennsylvania Academy of the Fine Arts, Philadelphia. Commissioned by Henry C. Gibson.
- George Washington (1869), marble, Independence Hall, Philadelphia. This was replaced by a bronze replica in 1910; the marble original is on display at Philadelphia City Hall.
- General John A. Rawlins (1872–74), bronze, Rawlins Park, 18th & E Streets NW, Washington, D.C.
- Equestrian statue of President Antonio Guzmán Blanco (1875–79), bronze, installed in Caracas, Venezuela in 1880.
- Reverend John Witherspoon (1876), bronze, West Fairmount Park, Philadelphia
- Flute Player (year), white marble, Woodmere Art Museum, Philadelphia, Pennsylvania
- Echo (year), white marble, Woodmere Art Museum, Philadelphia, Pennsylvania
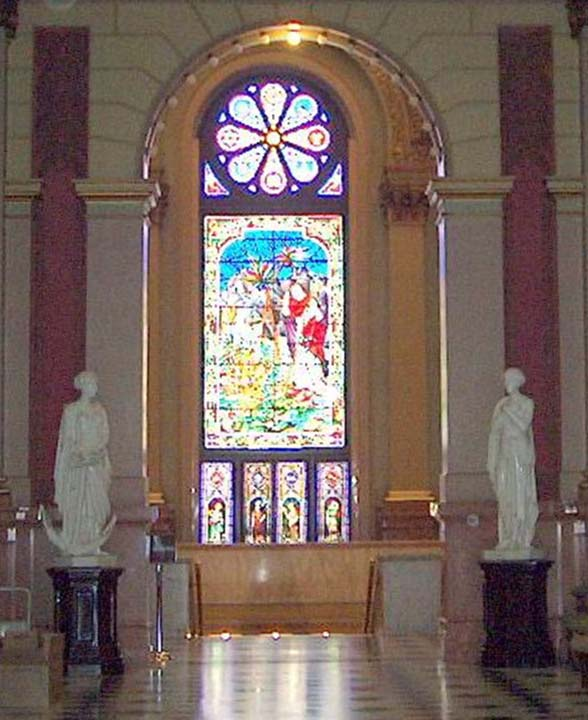
Hope and Faith (1855), Philadelphia Masonic Temple, Philadelphia

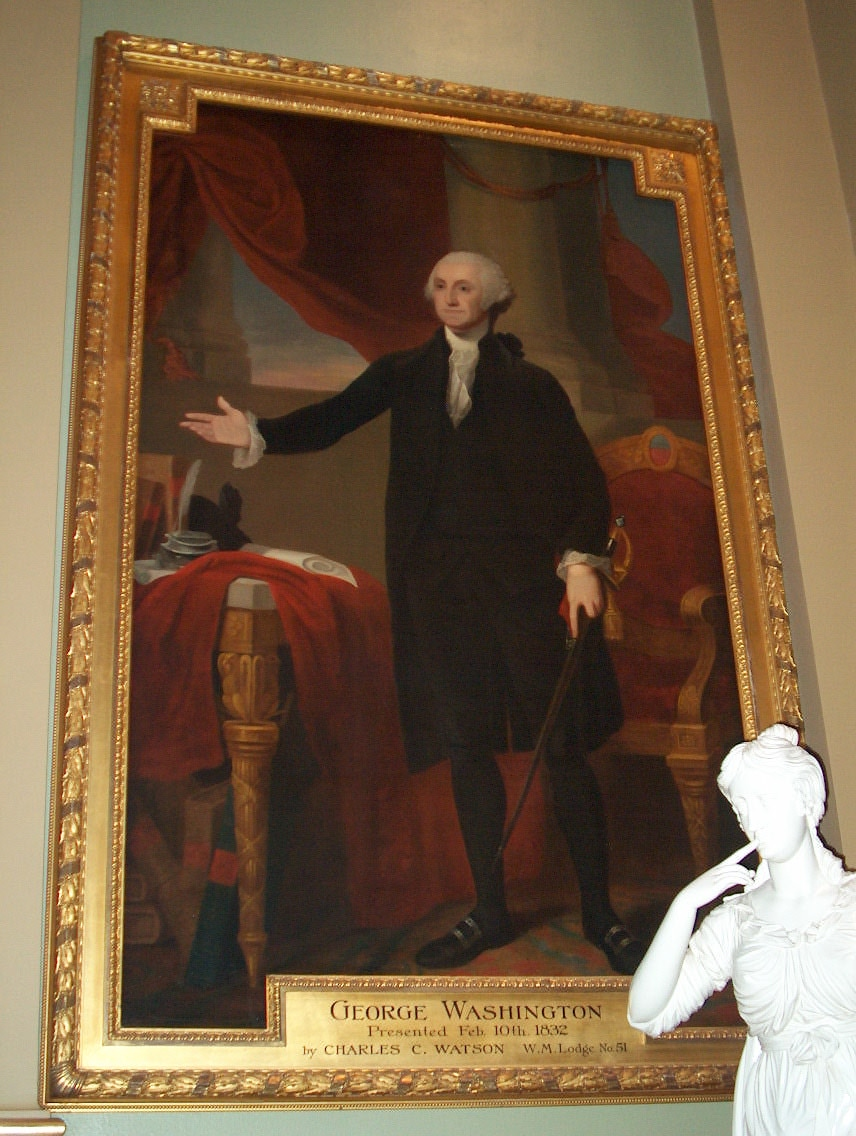
Wisdom (1855), Philadelphia Masonic Temple, Philadelphia

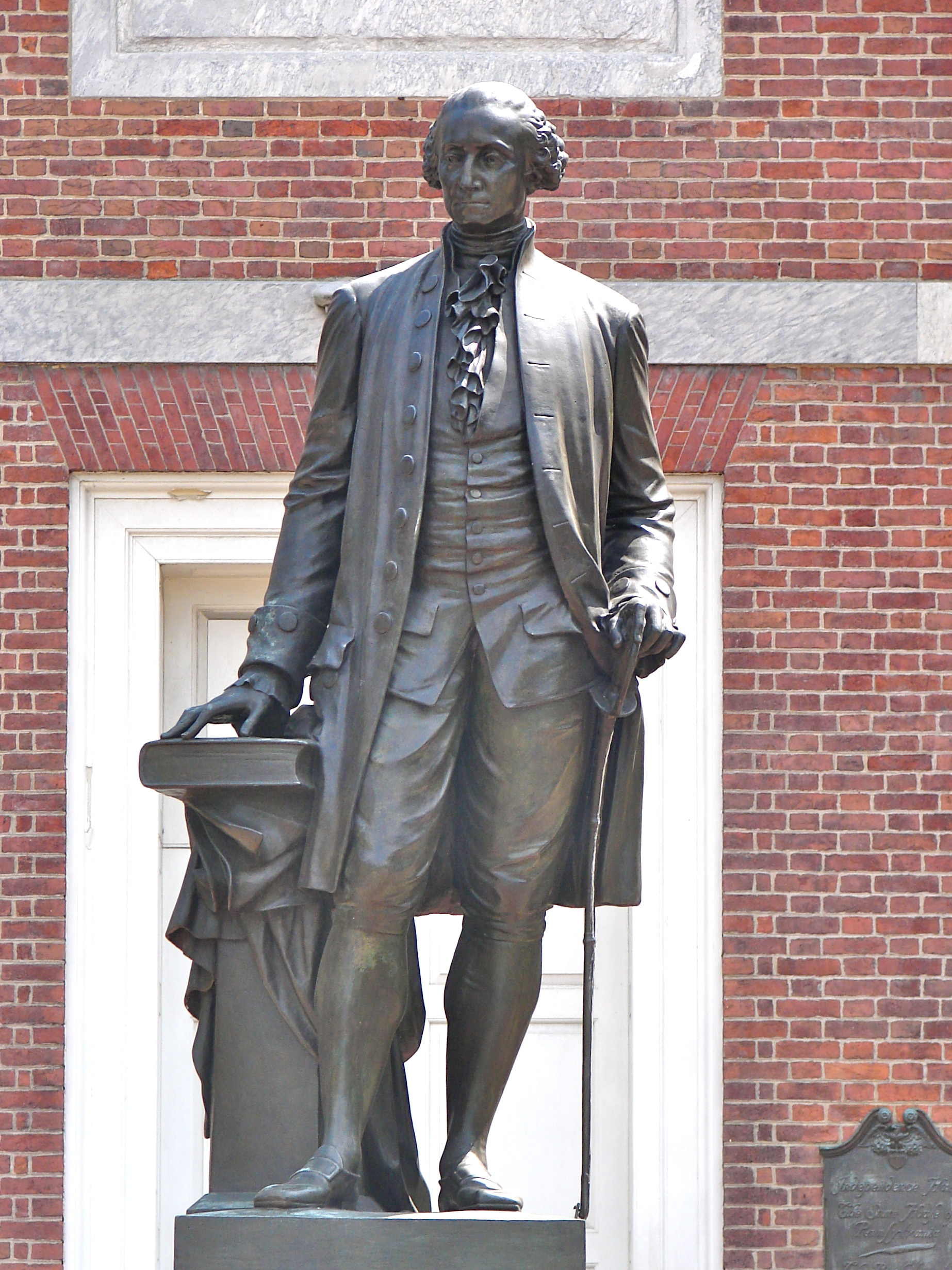
George Washington (original marble 1869, bronze replica 1910), Independence Hall, Philadelphia

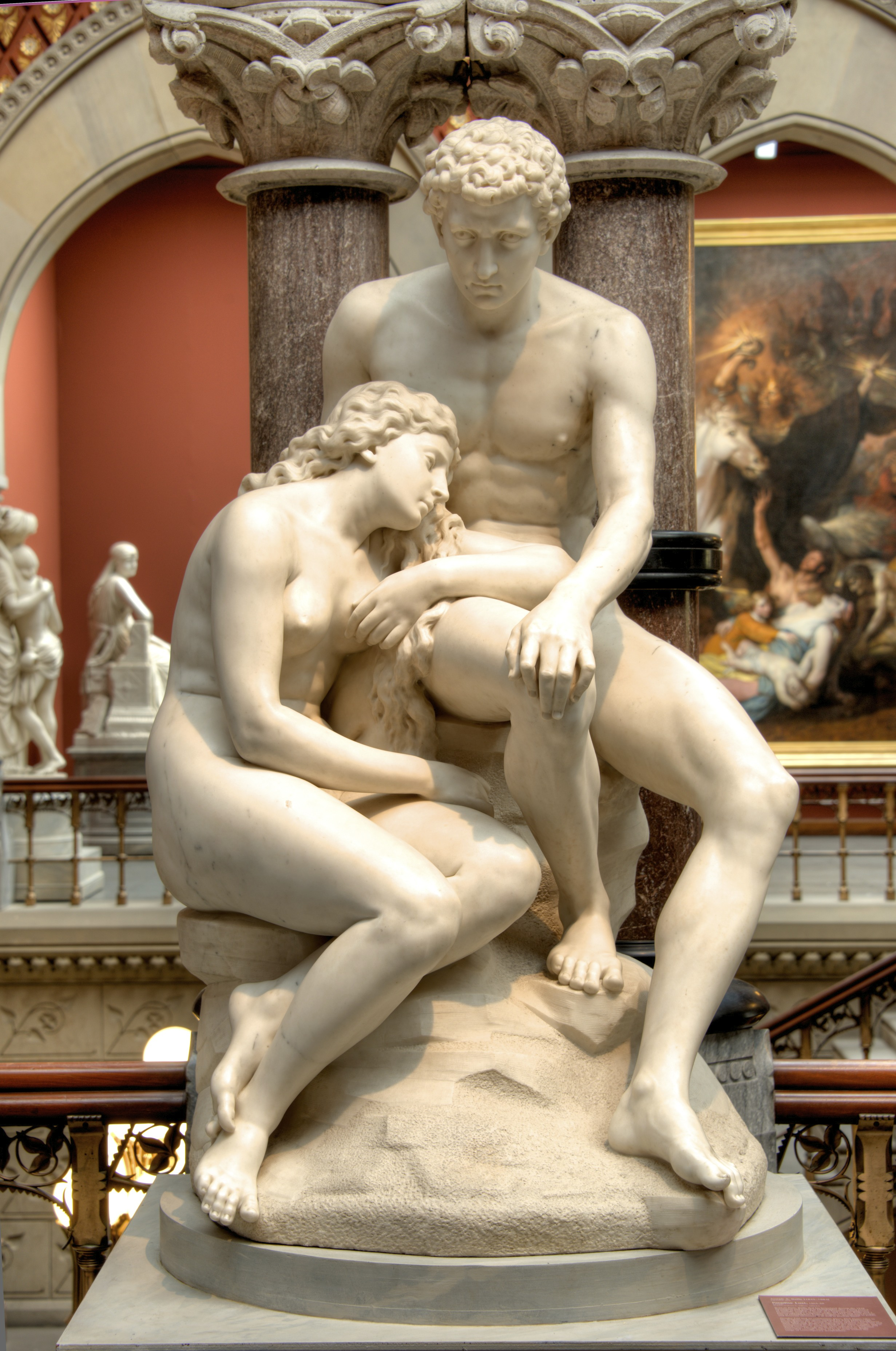
Paradise Lost (1863–68), Pennsylvania Academy of the Fine Arts, Philadelphia

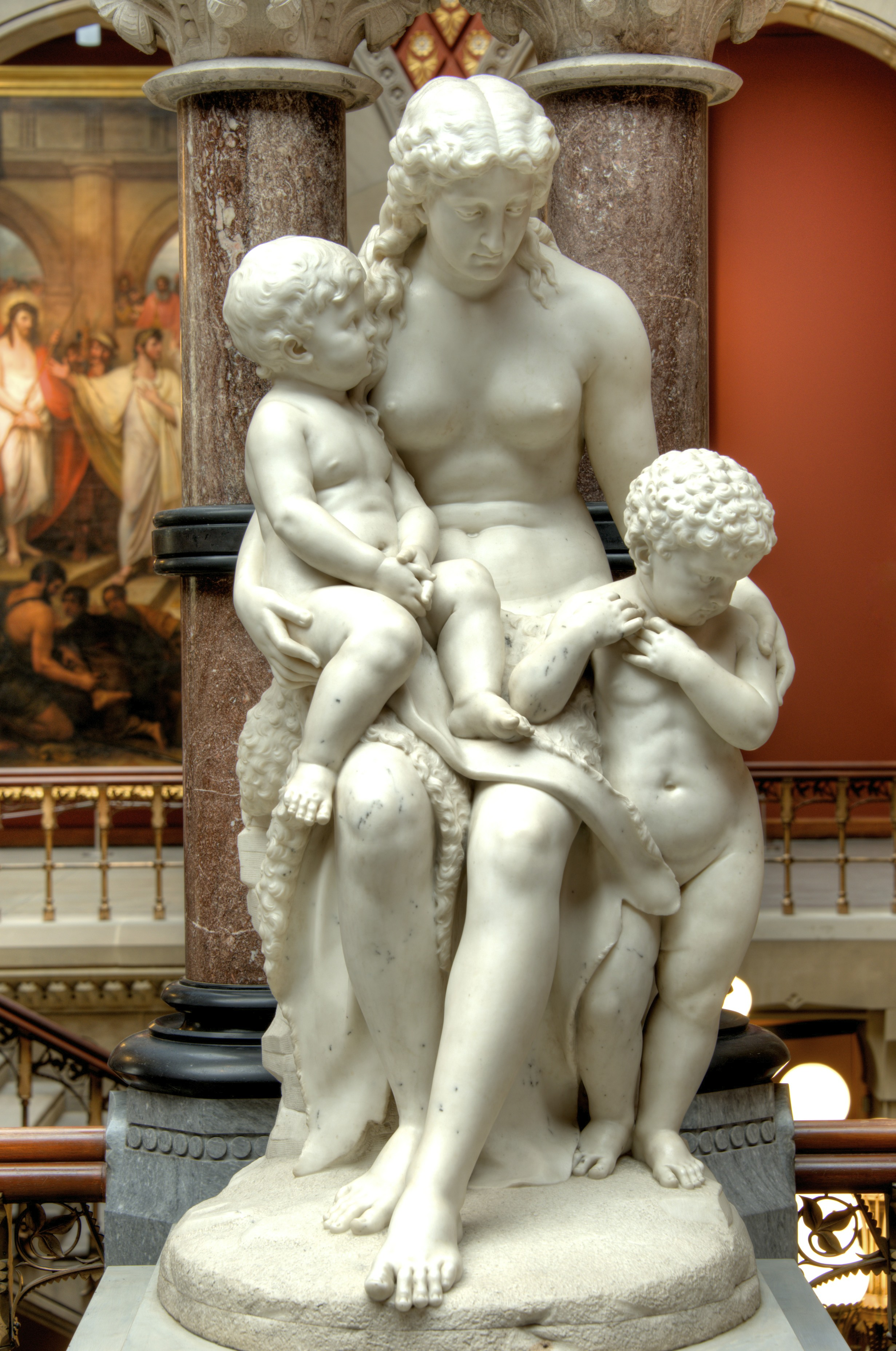
First Prayer (1864–68), Pennsylvania Academy of the Fine Arts, Philadelphia

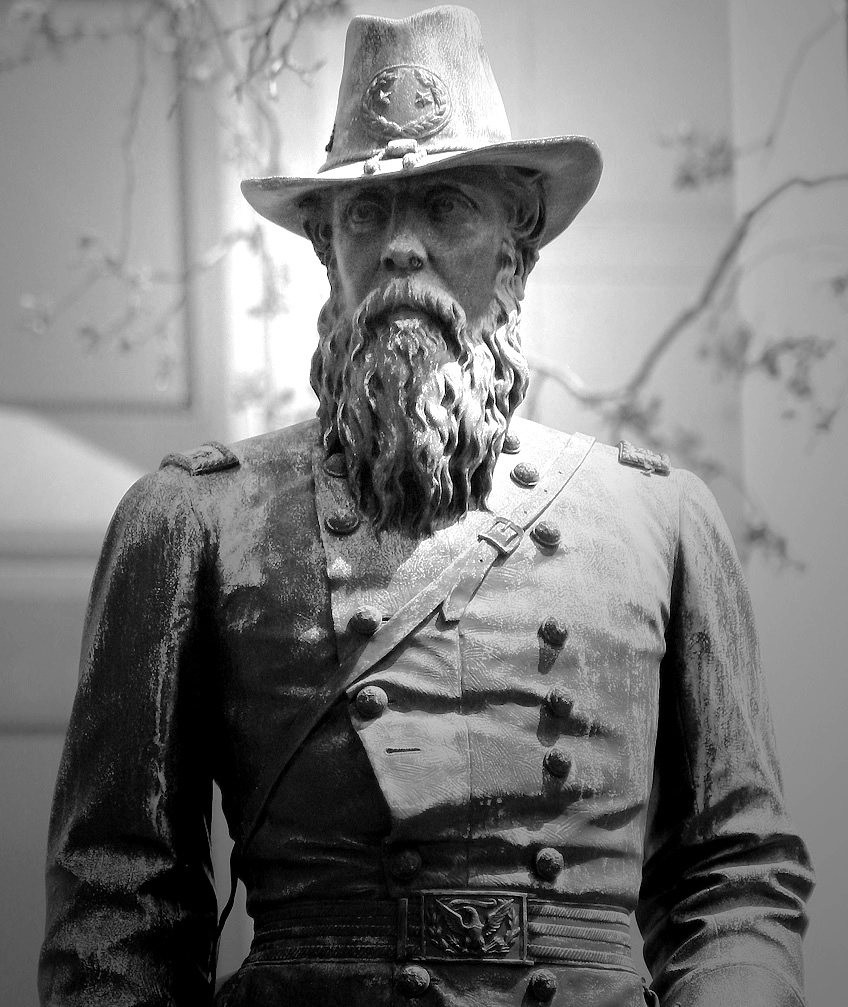
General John A. Rawlins (1872–74), Rawlins Park, Washington, D.C.

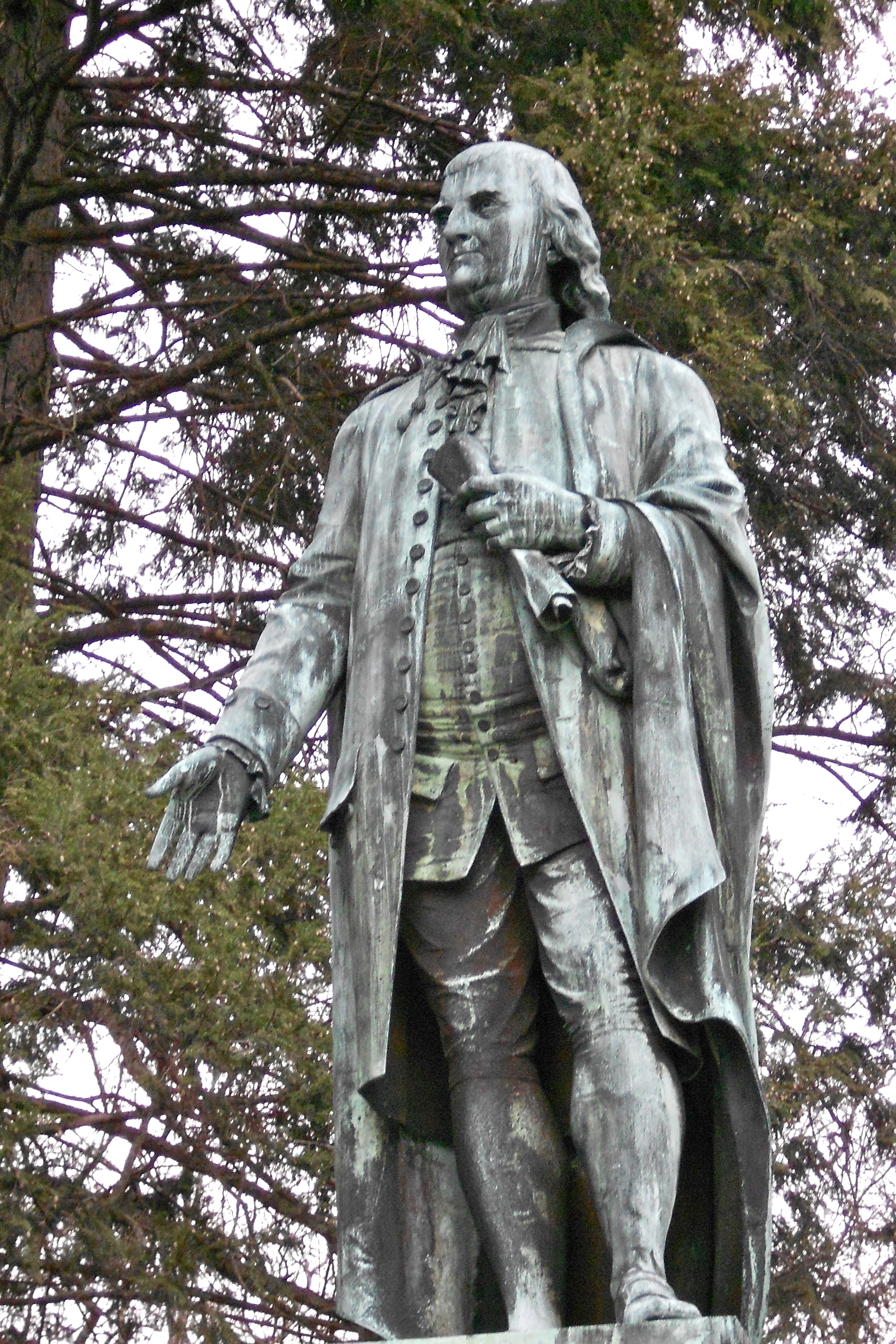
Reverend John Witherspoon (1876), West Fairmount Park, Philadelphia

=== Architectural sculpture ===
- New Masonic Hall, interior ornament and furniture (1855, burned 1886), Philadelphia, Pennsylvania, (with Charles Buschor). Bailly & Buschor created the interior ornament and furniture. The Gothic Room furniture survives at the current Philadelphia Masonic Temple.
- Academy of Music, interior ornament (1855–57), Philadelphia, Pennsylvania, (with Charles Buschor).
- U.S. Capitol, Monumental Clock, House of Representatives Chamber (1858), Washington, D.C., (with William Henry Rinehart). Bailly designed the clock and carved its wooden case. It is now on display in the Capitol's Crypt.
- Benjamin Franklin (1860), marble, created for façade of the Franklin Market, 10th & Ludlow Sts., Philadelphia. Installed on façade of the Public Ledger Building, 6th & Chestnut Sts., Philadelphia, 1869. Now displayed in the current Public Ledger Building's lobby.
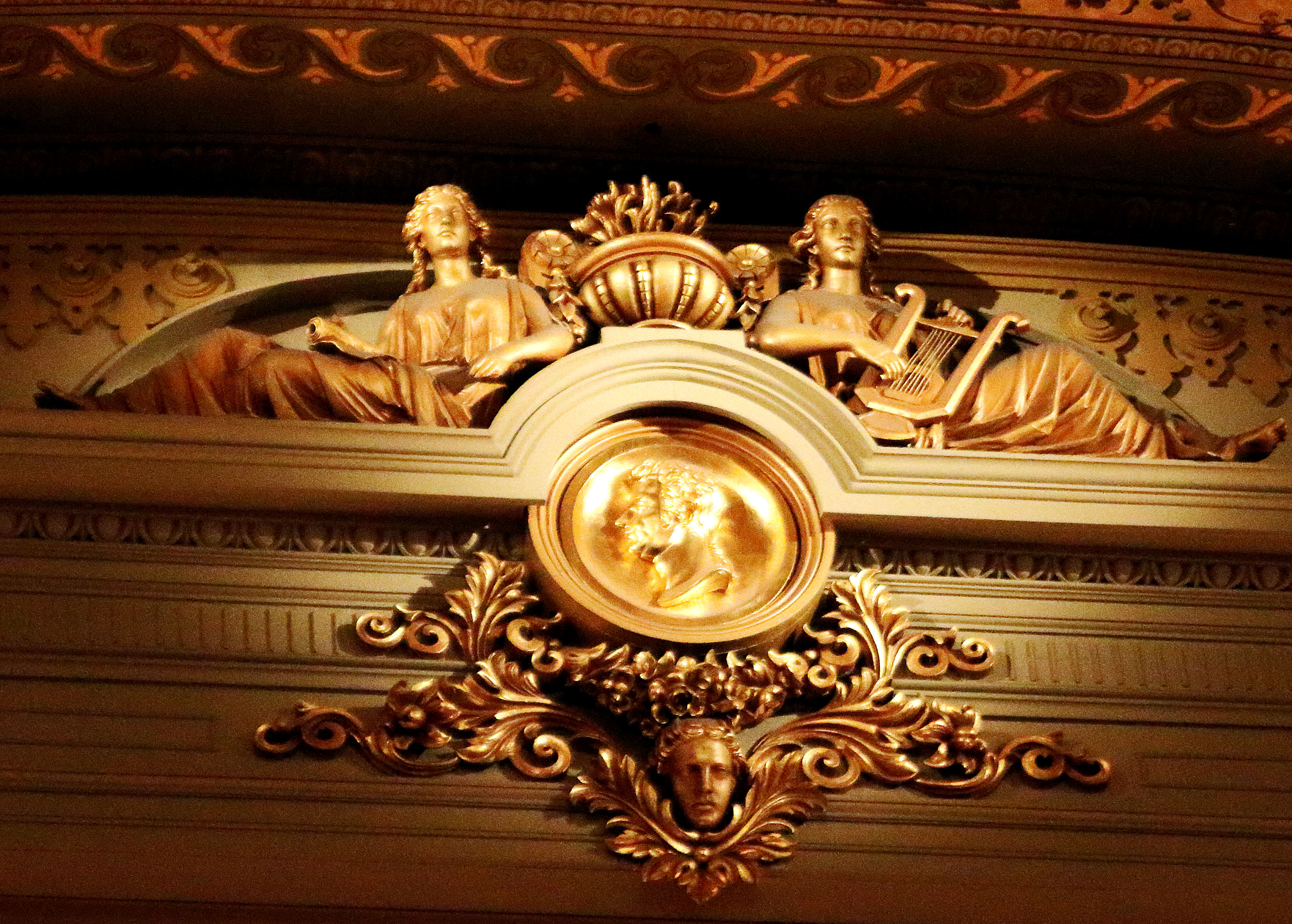
Music and Poetry above relief bust of Mozart (1857), Academy of Music, Philadelphia

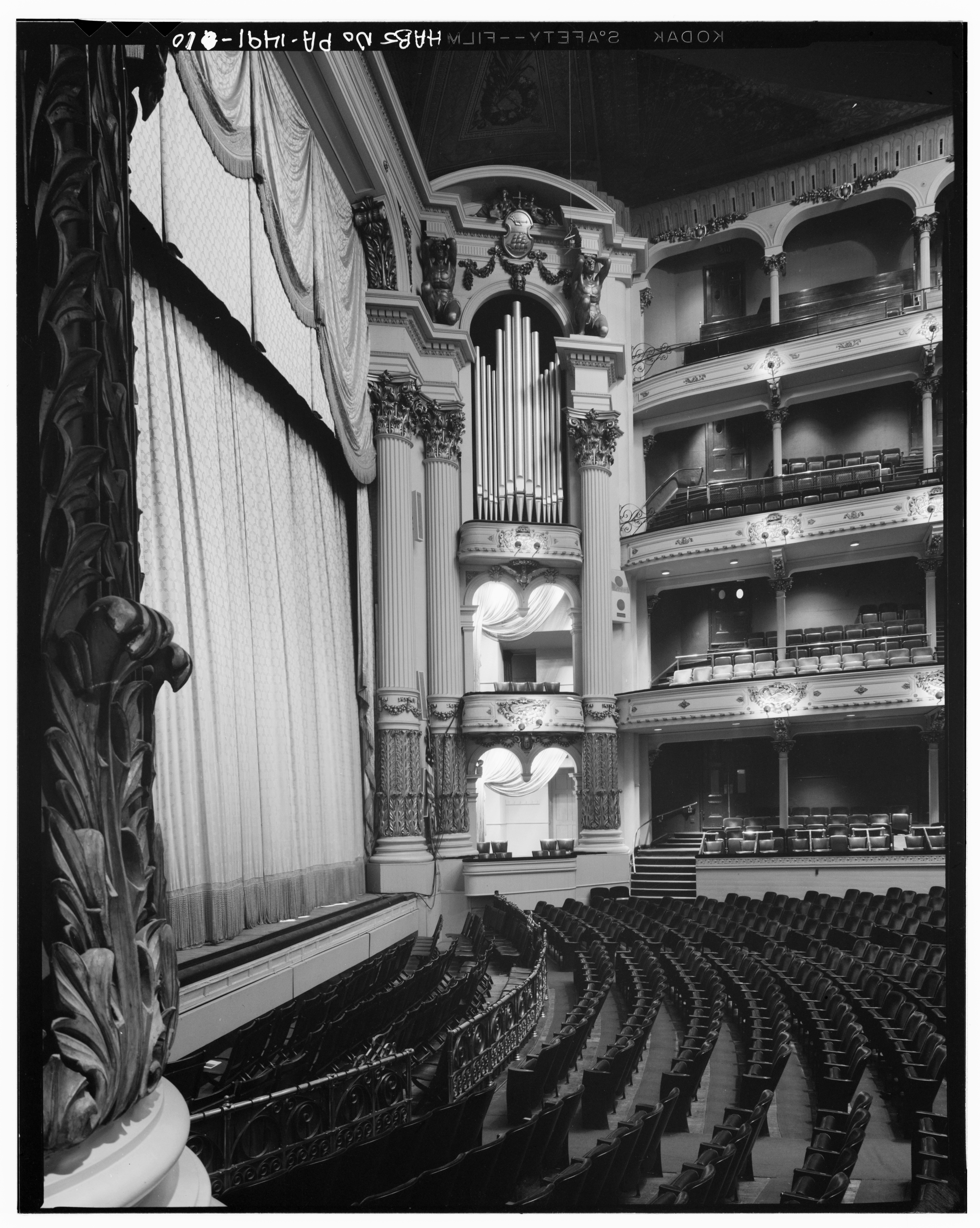
Stage boxes (1857), Academy of Music, Philadelphia

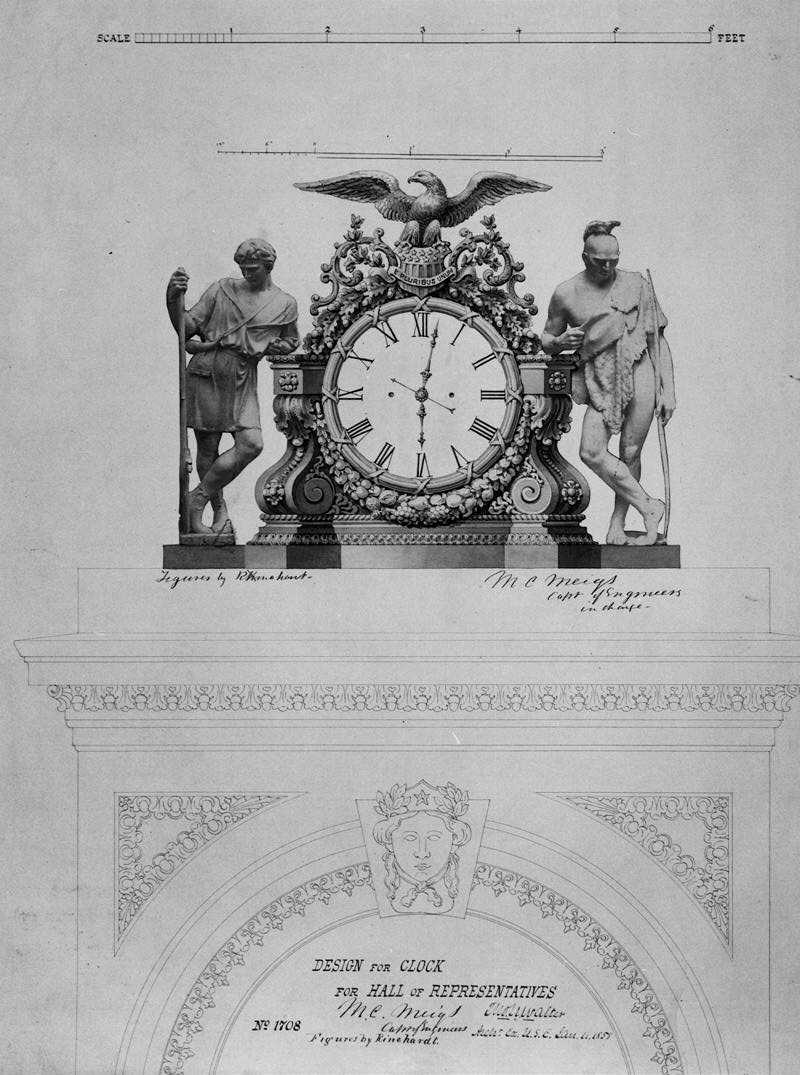
Monumental Clock, House of Representatives Chamber, U.S. Capitol, Washington, D.C. (1858)

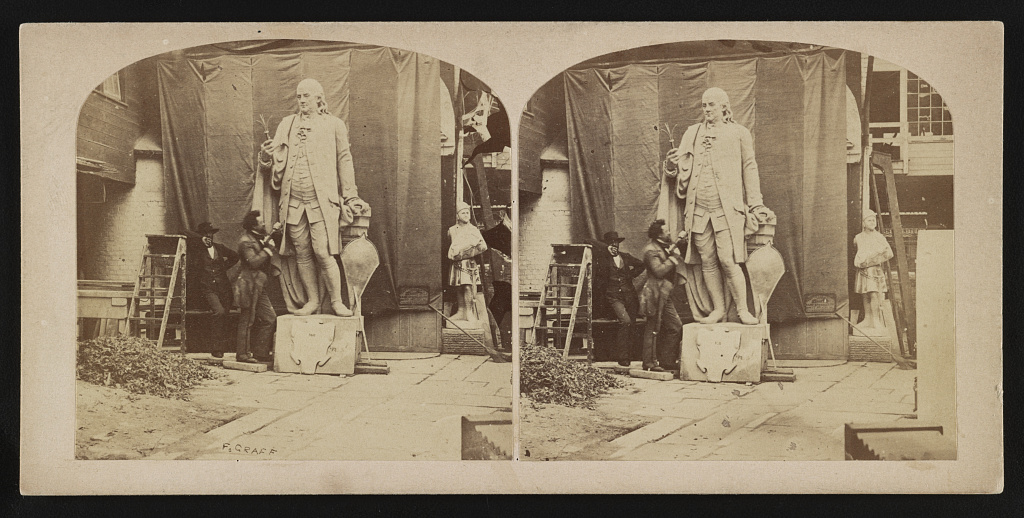
Benjamin Franklin (1860), created for Franklin Market. Installed on façade of Public Ledger Building (second story corner), 1869

=== Funeral sculpture ===
- General Francis E. Patterson Monument (c. 1868), marble, Laurel Hill Cemetery, Philadelphia, Pennsylvania.
- William Emlen Cresson Monument (1869), bronze, Laurel Hill Cemetery, Philadelphia, Pennsylvania.
- William F. Hughes Monument (1871), bronze, Laurel Hill Cemetery, Philadelphia, Pennsylvania.
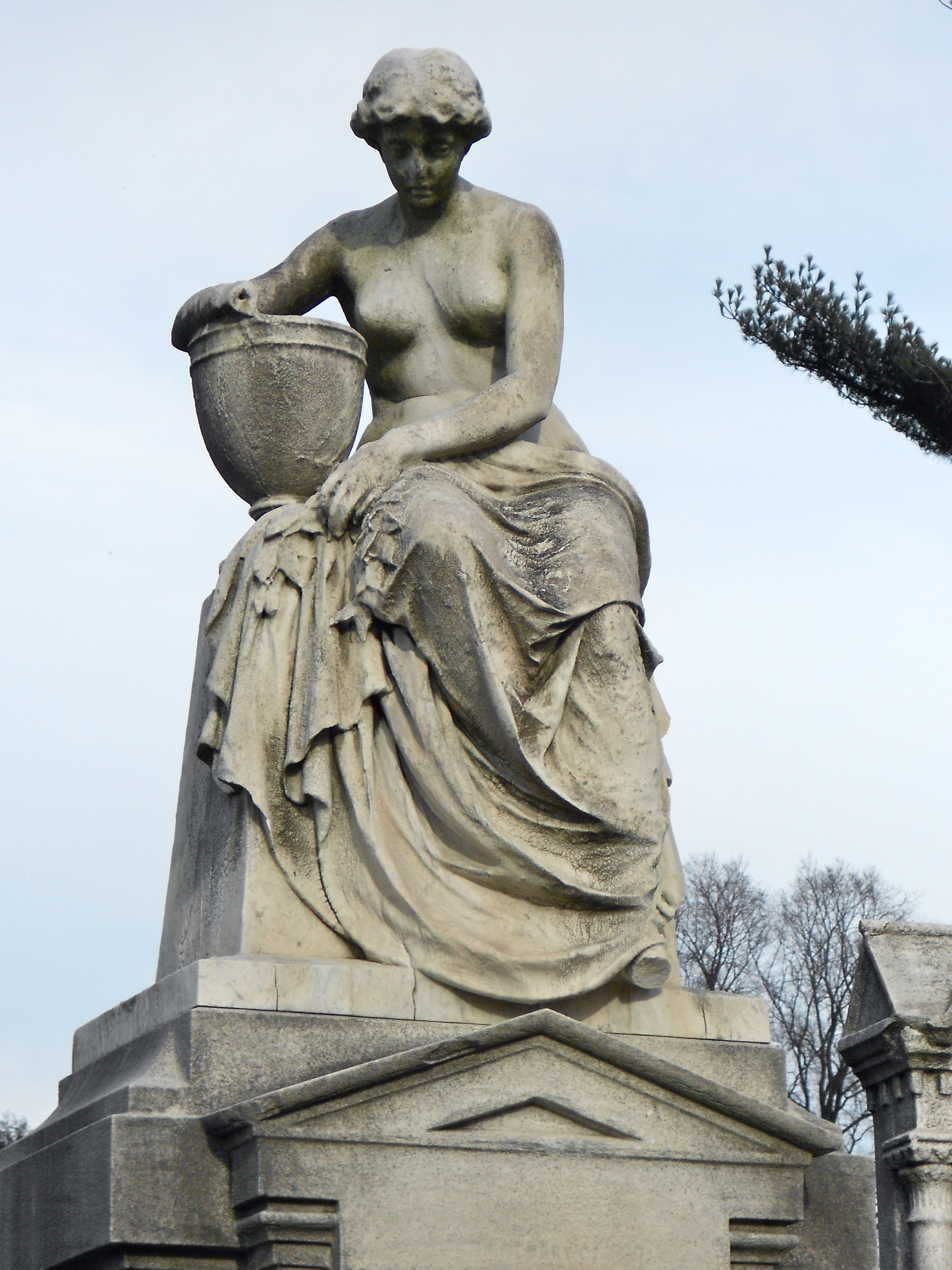
Patterson Monument (c. 1868), Laurel Hill Cemetery, Philadelphia, Pennsylvania

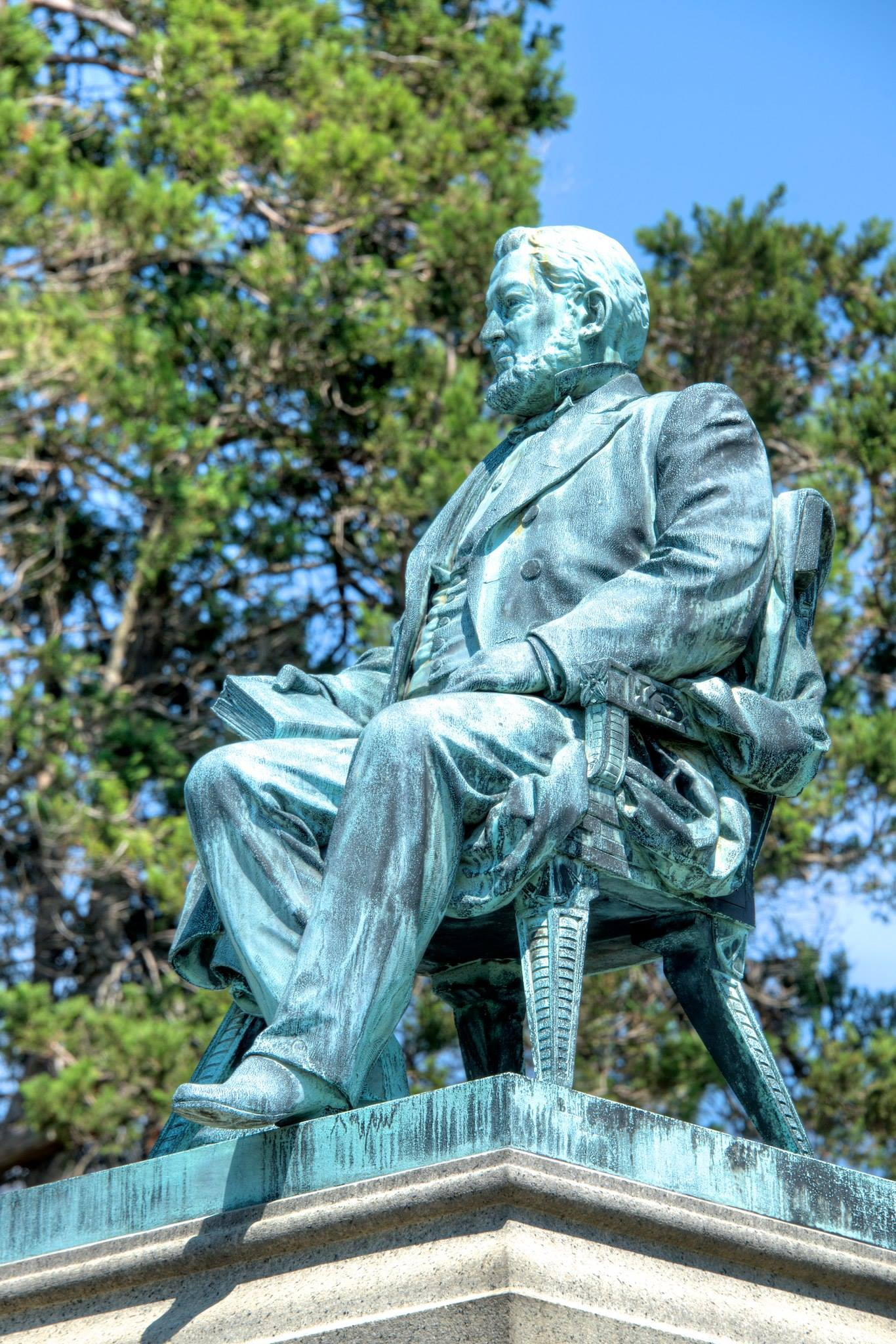
Hughes Monument (1871), Laurel Hill Cemetery, Philadelphia, Pennsylvania

=== Other works ===
- Sideboard, with carving attributed to Bailly (c. 1855), Cleveland Museum of Art, Cleveland, Ohio
- Bust of Abraham Lincoln (1865), metal alloy, mass-produced after the President's assassination
- Relief Portrait Bust of William Emlen Cresson (1866), Pennsylvania Academy of the Fine Arts, Philadelphia, Pennsylvania
- 1873 United States Trade Dollar (attributed)
- Bust of Benjamin Hallowell (c. 1877), plaster, Smithsonian American Art Museum, Washington, D.C.
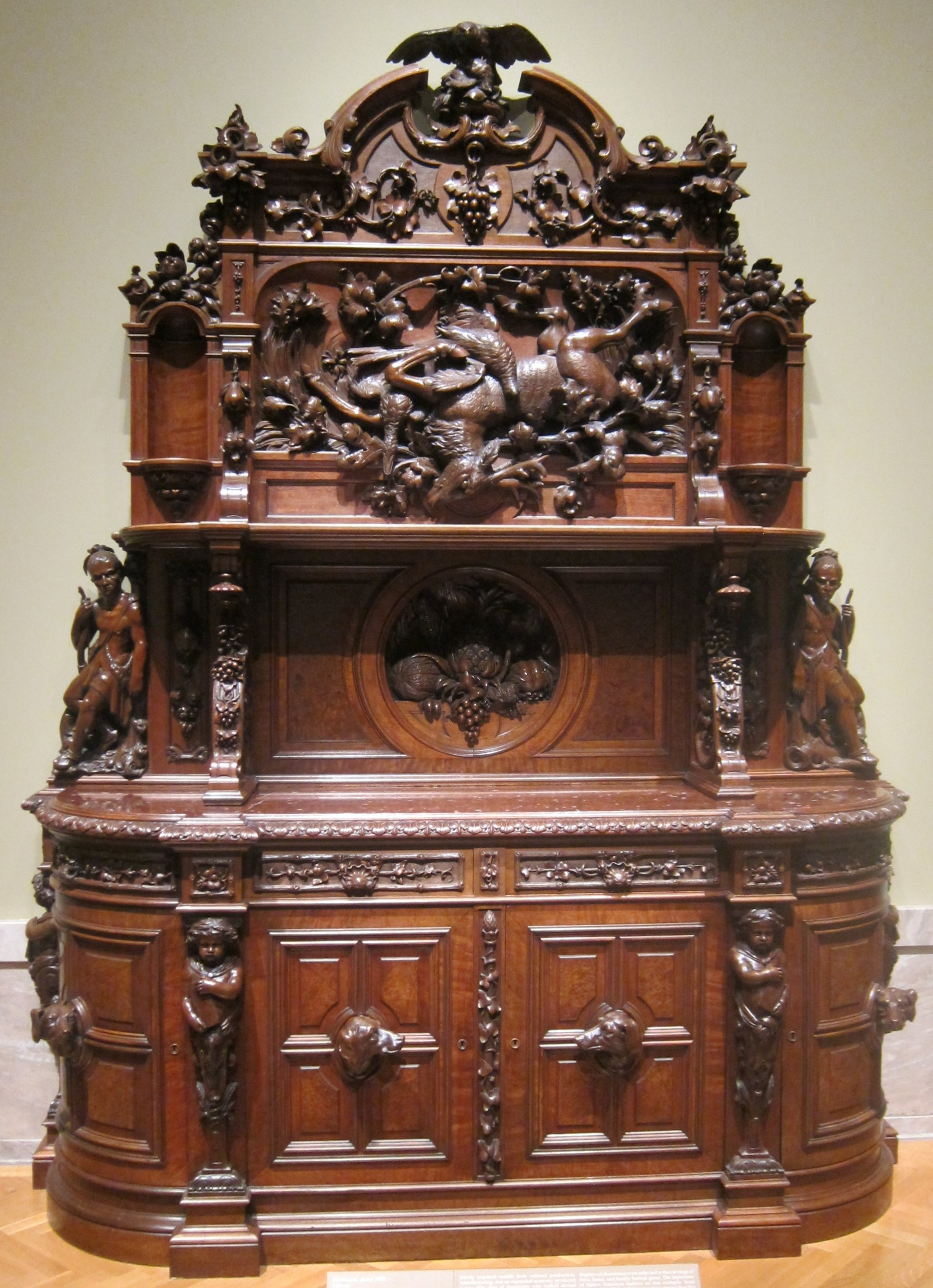
Sideboard, with carving attributed to Bailly (c. 1855), Cleveland Museum of Art, Cleveland, Ohio

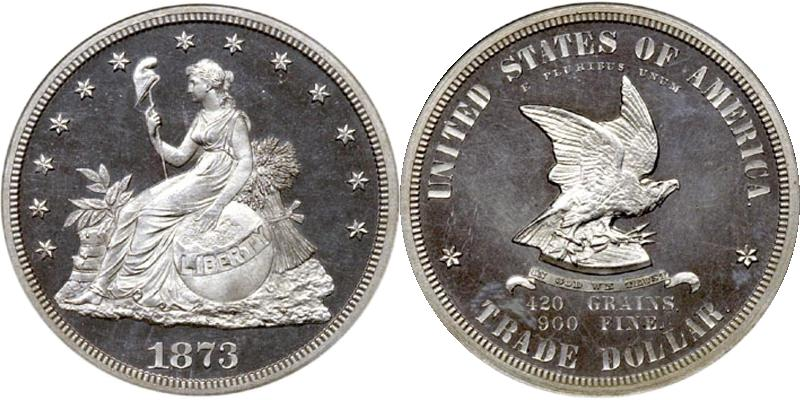
1873 United States Trade Dollar. Design and carving attributed to Bailly
