= Mill Hill, Trenton, New Jersey =

Populated place in Mercer County, New Jersey, US

Mill Hill
- Neighborhood of Trenton
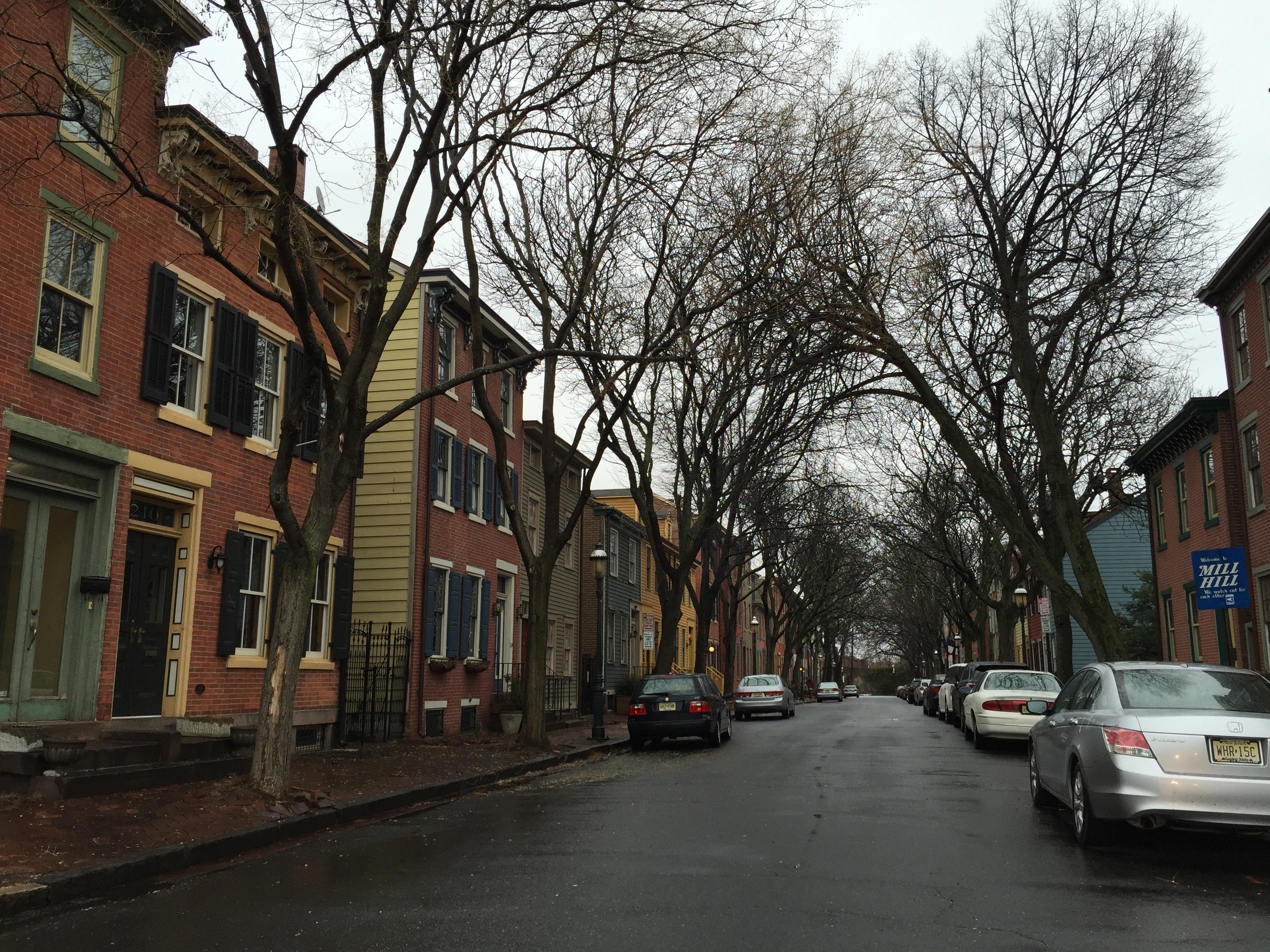
- Mercer Street in Mill Hill

- Location within Mercer County, New Jersey Location within New Jersey Location within the United States
- Coordinates: 40°13′01″N 74°45′34″W
- Country: United States
- State: New Jersey
- County: Mercer
- City: Trenton
- Demonym: Mill Hillite
- Postal codes: 08611, 08608

Mill Hill is a historic neighborhood located within the city of Trenton in Mercer County, in the U.S. state of New Jersey. It is considered to be part of Downtown Trenton. The Mill Hill Historic District was added to the National Register of Historic Places in 1977.

== History ==
=== 17th-18th centuries ===
The name Mill Hill refers to central New Jersey's first industrial site, a mill, erected in 1679, at the southeast corner of the present Broad Street crossing of the Assunpink Creek. Mill Hill and its wooden grist mill were among the holdings of the first settler in the vicinity of Trenton, Mahlon Stacy, a Quaker who arrived in North America in 1678. The mill was destroyed in a flood.

During the First Battle of Trenton, the last Hessian defense holdouts surrendered in what is now Mill Hill Park.

Mill Hill became famous in the late 18th century for being the site of the Second Battle of Trenton, a battle many historians consider the turning point in the American Revolutionary War. On January 1, 1777, Washington met with his generals at the Douglass House, which later served as his headquarters for the Battle of Princeton. The battle took place on January 2, 1777, in what is now Mill Hill Park. Every year, this battle is re-enacted during Patriots Week in Trenton.

=== 19th century ===
The name Mill Hill was applied to the area at least as early as 1821, with Market, Livingston, and parts of Jackson Streets having been laid out. During this time it was not yet part of the City of Trenton. Mill Hill remained relatively undeveloped during the first decades of the 19th century. In 1840, the entire area was incorporated as South Trenton and then into the City of Trenton in 1851.

Mill Hill grew rapidly during the second half of the 19th century as Trenton grew into an industrial center, with some major manufacturers opening near the neighborhood such as the Roebling steelworks.

By 1849, the original Stacy grist mill had been rebuilt as a paper mill. In 1849, a stone bridge was completed, connecting Mercer Street with Montgomery Street, which later changed into ornamental cast-iron railings in 1873. In the 1850s, sidewalks were required on Jackson, Mercer, and Livingston Streets, later being laid out with brick pavement in the 1890s. The Mercer Street Friends Center, a Quaker meeting house at 151 Mercer Street, was completed in 1858. In 1888, a Pratt truss bridge opened, connecting Jackson Street to the other side of the Assunpink Creek.

Between 1854-1895, the neighborhood's household count grew from 128 to 181, although it had reached a peak of 267 in 1865. Mill Hill's largely residential character was built primarily as two to three-story, three bay wide brick row homes, using various architectural styles such as Greek Revival, Italianate, Second Empire, and Eastlake. Around this time, Mill Hill was a middle class neighborhood populated predominately of small tradesmen, skilled industrial workers, and a few professionals. Asides from the Friends Meeting House, most of the buildings on Mercer Street were built between the 1870s-1890s. Many prominent local figures lived in the neighborhood during the mid-late 19th century.

=== 20th century ===
==== Early 20th century ====
During the early 20th century, Trenton was an industrial hub of international importance, being the principal center of the pottery and ceramic industry of the United States. Companies like Roebling were operating at their peak during this time, creating the wire cables used to construct most of the major suspension bridges built in the United States, including the Golden Gate Bridge and George Washington Bridge. Broad Street had become a highly-regarded shopping strip with many exclusive clothing stores within Mercer County. Due to the rapid industrialization, the population of Mill Hill swelled rapidly, enhanced by immigration. By 1920, 52% of the city's population was foreign-born, with Mill Hill attracting Jewish immigrants in particular. Mill Hill remained a Jewish neighborhood until the 1940s, when many Jews began to move out. The "Arbeiter Ring" Jewish fraternal organization built a building on Mercer Street, in which their "AR" logo is still visible on the building.

==== Decline ====
During the Great Depression, Trenton started to decline due to the national trend of consolidation of manufacturing plants, which often led to jobs leaving Trenton for other states and overseas. By 1953 Roebling Steel was one of Trenton's last great manufacturers to be sold to another company and then closed. With suburbanization drawing city residents out and suburban shopping malls replacing urban Main Streets, Trenton, and ultimately Mill Hill declined, particularly between the 1950s-1970s. Mill Hill became isolated from the rest of the city due to the construction of roads such as the Trenton Freeway and massive urban renewal projects that demolished much of the historic surrounding neighborhoods for parking lots or other purposes.

During this time, Mill Hill transformed from predominately single-family, owner-occupied housing to a majority multi-family, renter-occupied population. Vacant properties in Mill Hill went from 3% in 1952 to a high of 17% in 1970.

==== Revitalization ====
In the 1980s, a revitalization of Mill Hill capitalized on the neighborhood's "Georgetown"-like brick houses

Since the early 1960s, Mill Hill has been undergoing a revitalization. In 1960, Trenton adopted a redevelopment plan with the goal of converting the neighborhood into a "Georgetown". Instead of replacing the historical fabric of the area, the buildings were to be preserved and renovated. The red brick row-houses - primarily constructed in the late 19th century - have been restored, in many cases being converted back to single-family homes. In a symbolic act that ended up carrying significant weight for the neighborhood, the then Mayor of Trenton, Arthur J. Holland, moved his family to 138 Mercer Street on February 28, 1964. "Mayor Arthur Holland and his young wife were idealistic newlyweds with a baby daughter in 1964 when they decided to restore a house in Trenton's crumbling, if historic, Mill Hill neighborhood." The restoration of the area has proceeded in waves ever since.

Initially focused on the 100 blocks of Mercer and Jackson Streets, as well as South Montgomery Street, some residents began renovating their homes. In 1967, the first Holiday House Tour took place. The tour became an annual event that continues today, attracting more than 1,000 people who tour the historic homes. With these changes came improving house prices, more investment and more restoration.

After the property collapse of the late 1980s, the second wave of renovation started after prices in Mill Hill declined. Commercial developers, led by Atlantis Historic Properties, took up renovating the vacant properties on the 200 blocks of Mercer, Jackson and Clay streets. Property values in the neighborhood began rapidly rising in the 1990s. Atlantis was formed by the members of the Mill Hill community themselves (in the early 1990s) to preserve and restore the historic homes - starting with the properties at 261 and 263 Jackson Street. Beginning in 1991, the Mill Hill Garden Tour allowed visitors to do self-guided tours of resident's backyard gardens, which continues to the present.

=== 21st century ===
Today, renovated historic structures and historically sensitive new construction stand side by side. The Quaker Meetinghouse on 151 Mercer is also home to the offices of Mercer Street Friends, a Quaker-affiliated social service agency serving Trenton and surrounding communities. The neighborhood still hosts the annual Holiday House Tour and the annual Garden Tour.

In 2013, Trenton released a redevelopment plan for Broad Street, which functions as the primary commercial strip in Mill Hill. The plan called for streetscape improvements, façade and restoration upgrades, wayfinding improvements, and many other goals to help continue to revitalize the area. In 2013, construction began on The Whittaker, a 40-unit, four-story condo building at 350 S Broad Street. In June 2023, the NJEDA announced a new 120-unit, five-story residential building at 150-170 Broad Street.

== Historic district ==
- Mill Hill Historic District
- U.S. National Register of Historic Places
- U.S. Historic district
- New Jersey Register of Historic Places
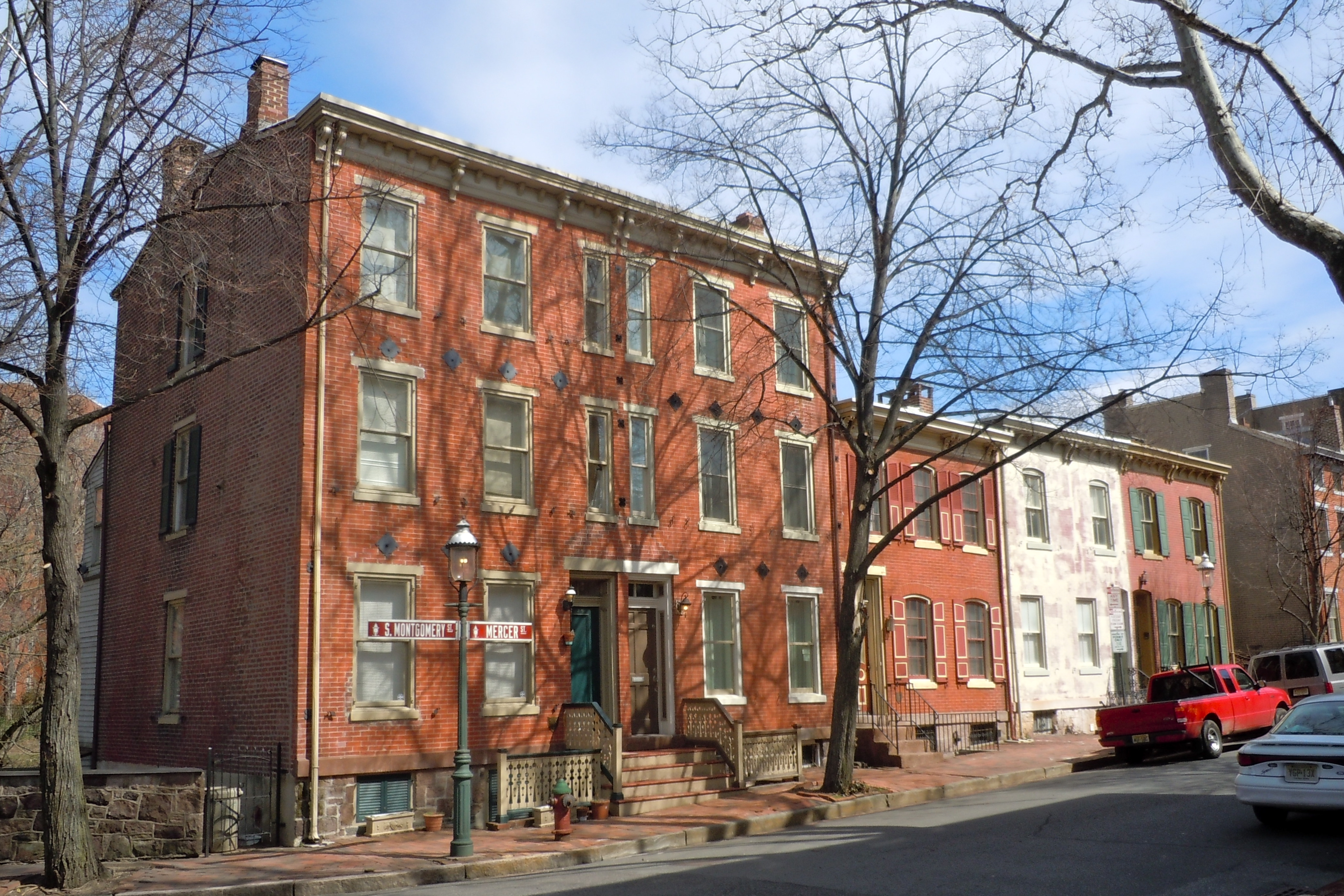
- Montgomery and Mercer Streets
- Location: Roughly bounded by Clay, Jackson, Front, Market, Broad, and Greenwood Streets
- Area: 31.5 acres (12.7 ha)
- Architectural style: Greek Revival, Second Empire, Queen Anne
- NRHP reference No.: 77000880
- NJRHP No.: 1781

Significant dates
- Added to NRHP: December 12, 1977
- Designated NJRHP: April 13, 1977

The Mill Hill Historic District is a 31.5-acre (12.7 ha) historic district encompassing the neighborhood and roughly bounded by Clay, Jackson, Front, Market, Broad, and Greenwood Streets. It was added to the National Register of Historic Places on December 12, 1977, for its significance in architecture, commerce, and military history. The district includes 284 contributing buildings, two contributing structures, and one contributing object. The individually listed Douglass House and Mercer Street Friends Center contribute to the district. A marble statue of George Washington, once owned by Mahlon Dickerson Eyre and displayed at the Centennial Exposition in 1876, is located near the Douglass House. Washington is shown standing on a boat, symbolically representing his crossing of the Delaware River before his victory at the Battle of Trenton.

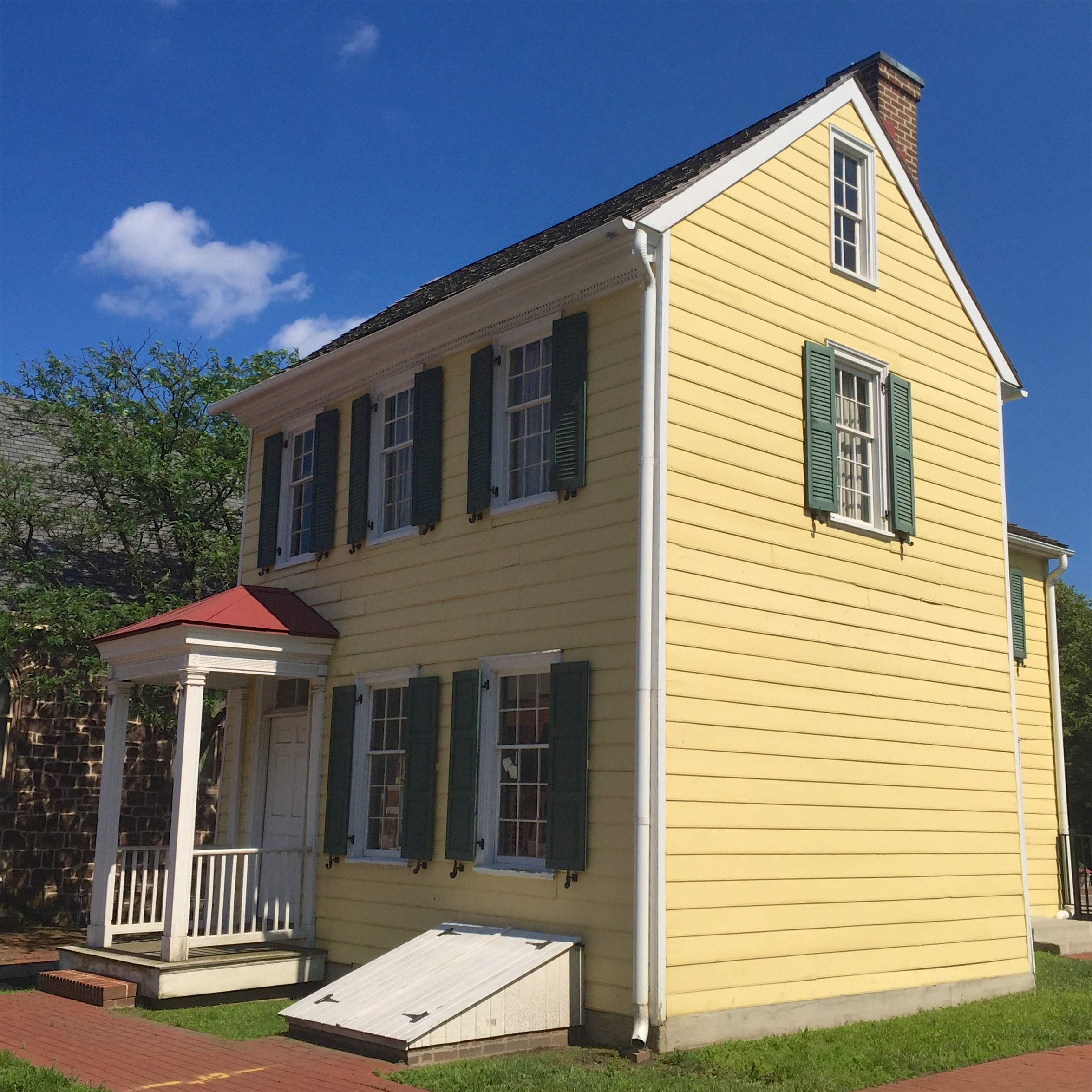
Douglass House

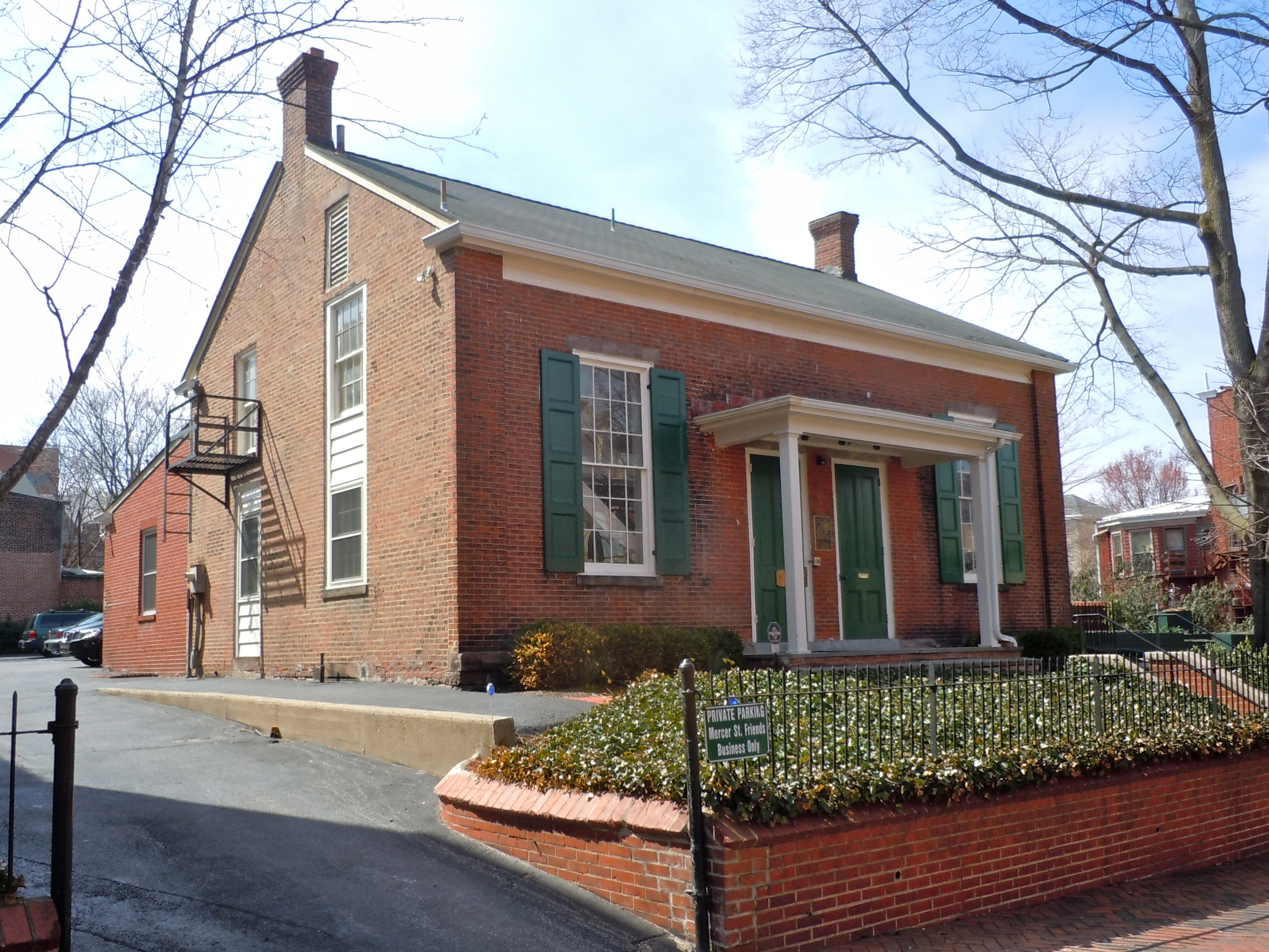
Mercer Street Friends Center

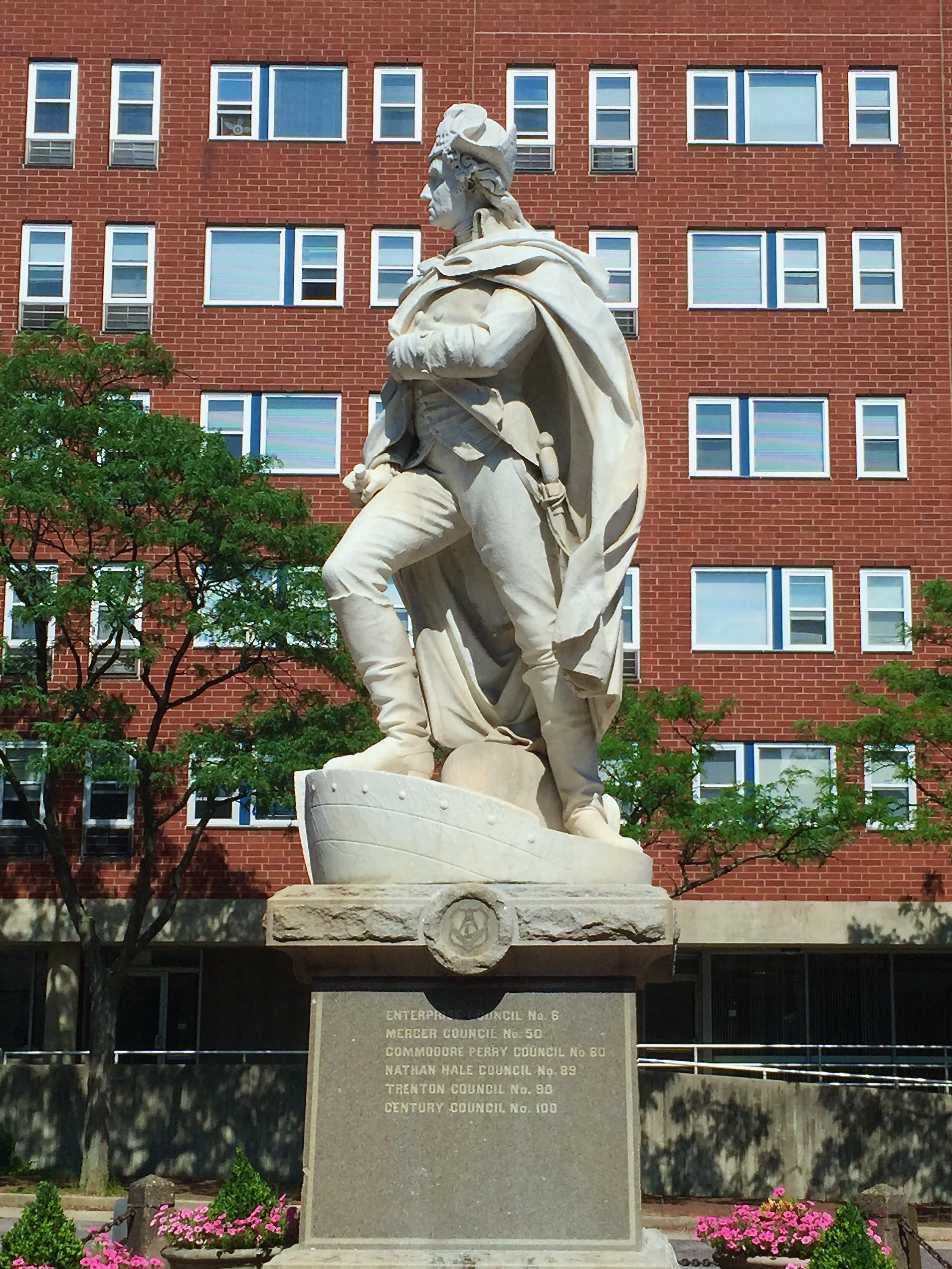
George Washington

== See also ==
- National Register of Historic Places listings in Mercer County, New Jersey
