= Statue of George Washington (Trenton, New Jersey) =

Marble sculpture in New Jersey, US

George Washington
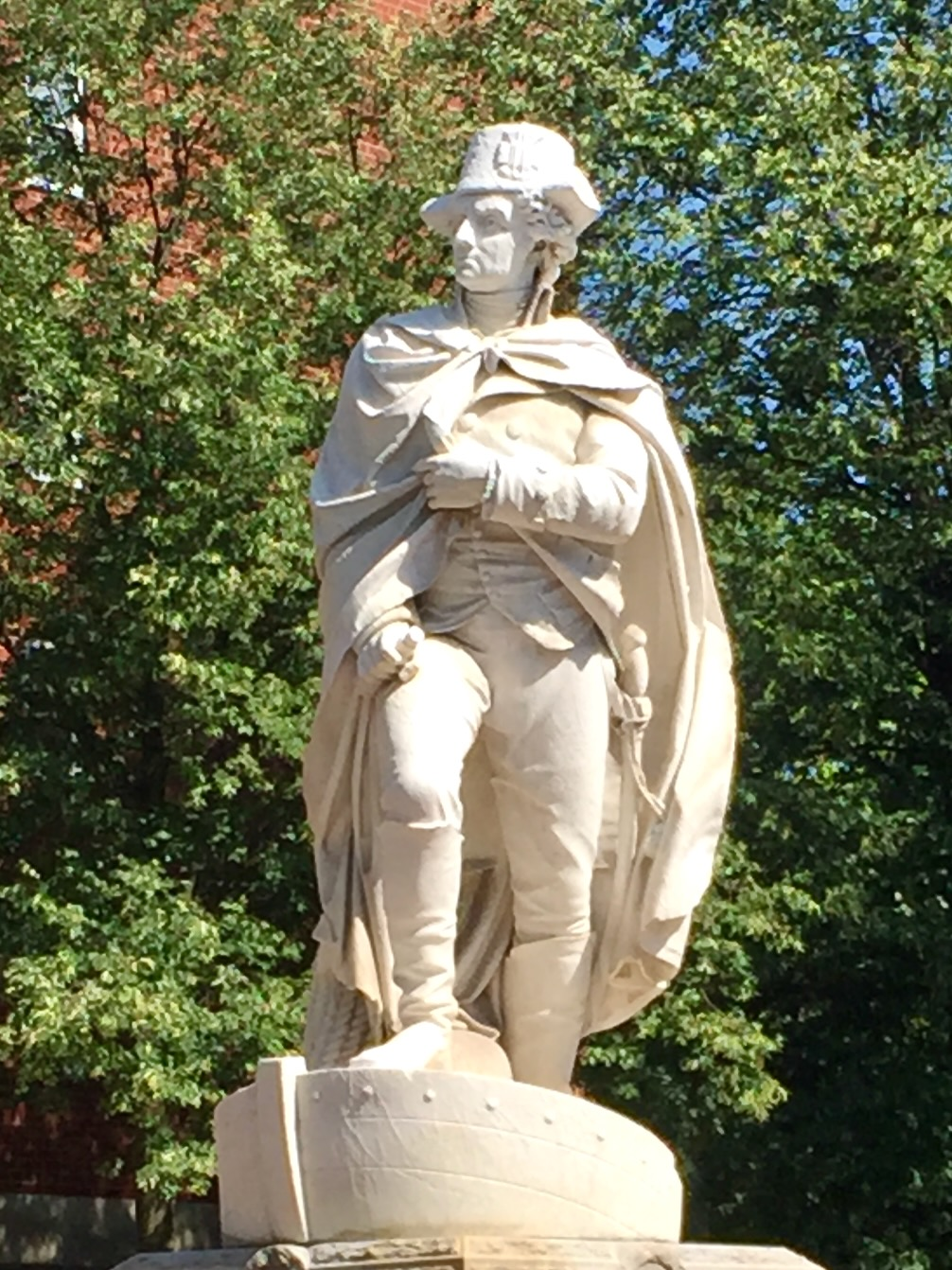
- Washington Crossing the Delaware

- Location within Mercer County, New Jersey Location within New Jersey Location within the United States
- Artist: Fratelli Gianfranchi
- Year: c. 1876
- Medium: Carrara marble
- Subject: George Washington, George Washington's crossing of the Delaware River
- Dimensions: 4.3 m × 2.3 m × 2.1 m (14 ft × 7.4 ft × 6.9 ft)
- Location: Mill Hill, Trenton, New Jersey, United States; 40°13′6.8″N 74°45′41.2″W

George Washington, also known as Washington Crossing the Delaware, is a large 1876 marble statue by the Italian sculptors Fratelli Gianfranchi. The sculpture depicts General George Washington in a pose taken from the 1851 painting Washington Crossing the Delaware by Emanuel Leutze. It was owned by the banker Mahlon Dickerson Eyre and displayed at the Centennial Exposition of 1876 in Philadelphia. The statue is currently in the Mill Hill neighborhood of the city of Trenton in Mercer County, New Jersey, United States.

== History ==
Around 1876, sculptors Fratelli Gianfranchi (Note: Fratelli Gianfranchi means Gianfranchi Brothers in English.) from Carrara, Italy, carved this large statue of George Washington from a single block of Carrara marble. It was modeled on the painting Washington Crossing the Delaware by Emanuel Leutze. The owner of the statue was Mahlon Dickerson Eyre, a banker from Philadelphia, who was residing in Florence, Italy, at the time. He loaned this colossal marble statue to the 1876 Centennial Exposition, held in Fairmount Park in Philadelphia. On April 25, 1889, after Eyre's death, the statue was sold at auction for $300 to George R. Whittaker, accompanied by two councilmen from Trenton, Edmund C. Hill and Lewis R. Lawton. The Junior Order of United American Mechanics erected a granite pedestal for the statue in 1892. On October 18, 1892, the statue was unveiled and dedicated as the Washington Monument in the newly created Cadwalader Park in Trenton. The statue was located on a bluff facing the Delaware River, which Washington had crossed before his victory at the Battle of Trenton on the morning of December 26, 1776. During the 1976 Bicentennial, the statue was relocated to a plaza near the Douglass House in the Mill Hill neighborhood of Trenton. The house was Washington's headquarters on the night of January 2, 1777, after the Battle of the Assunpink Creek, the second battle of Trenton.

== Description ==
Washington is shown standing in a boat, facing forward, with his right foot raised on the prow. He is wearing a Continental Army military uniform with a cape and a tricorner hat with cockade. A sheathed sword is hanging on his left side. His left arm is bent holding the cape. His right hand holds a telescope. The statue is 14 feet (4.3 m) high. The statue is on a granite pedestal. The front inscription reads: “This pedestal was erected by the Jr. O. U. A. M. and presented to the city of Trenton, October 18th, 1892”.

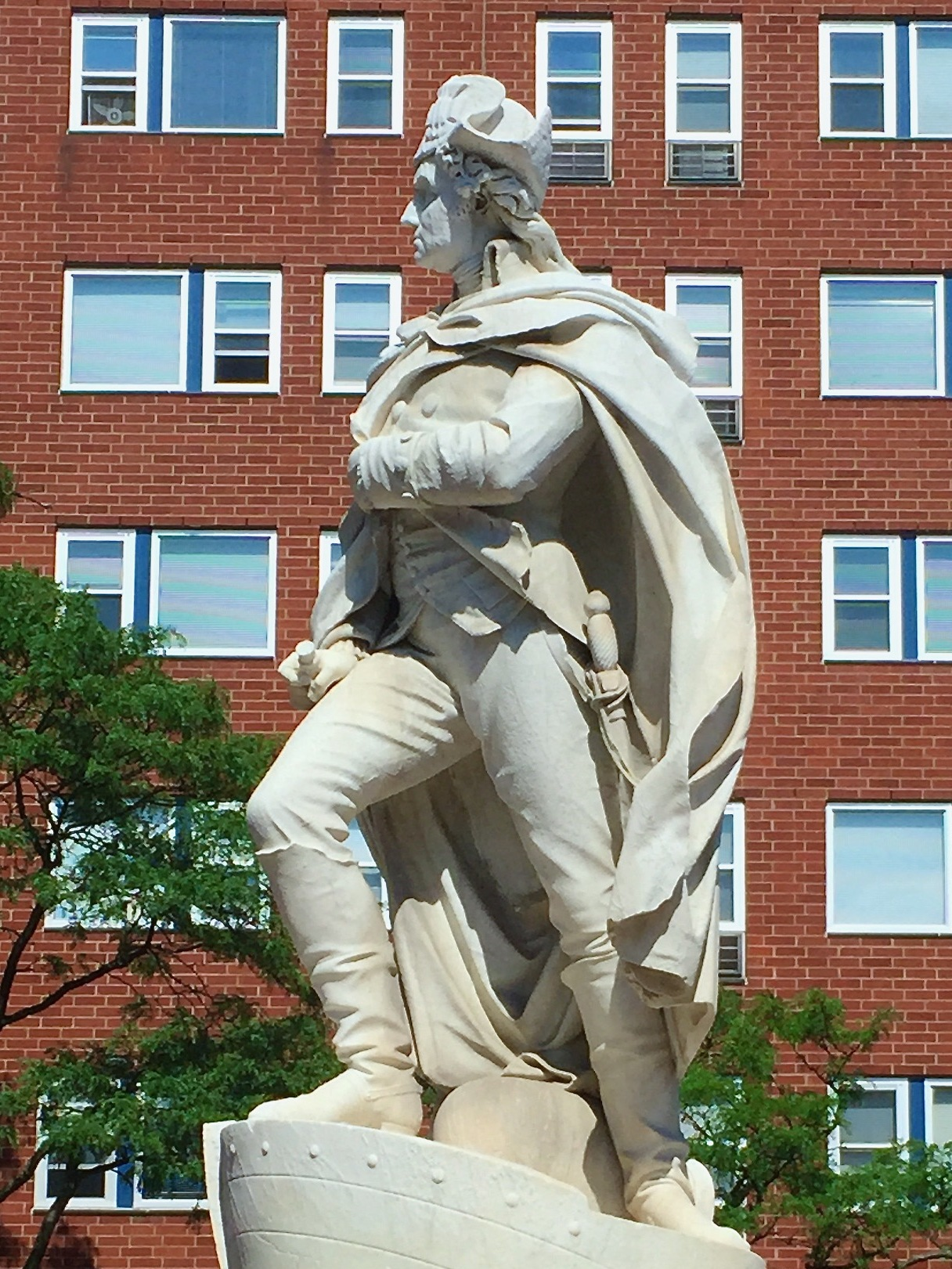
Profile view

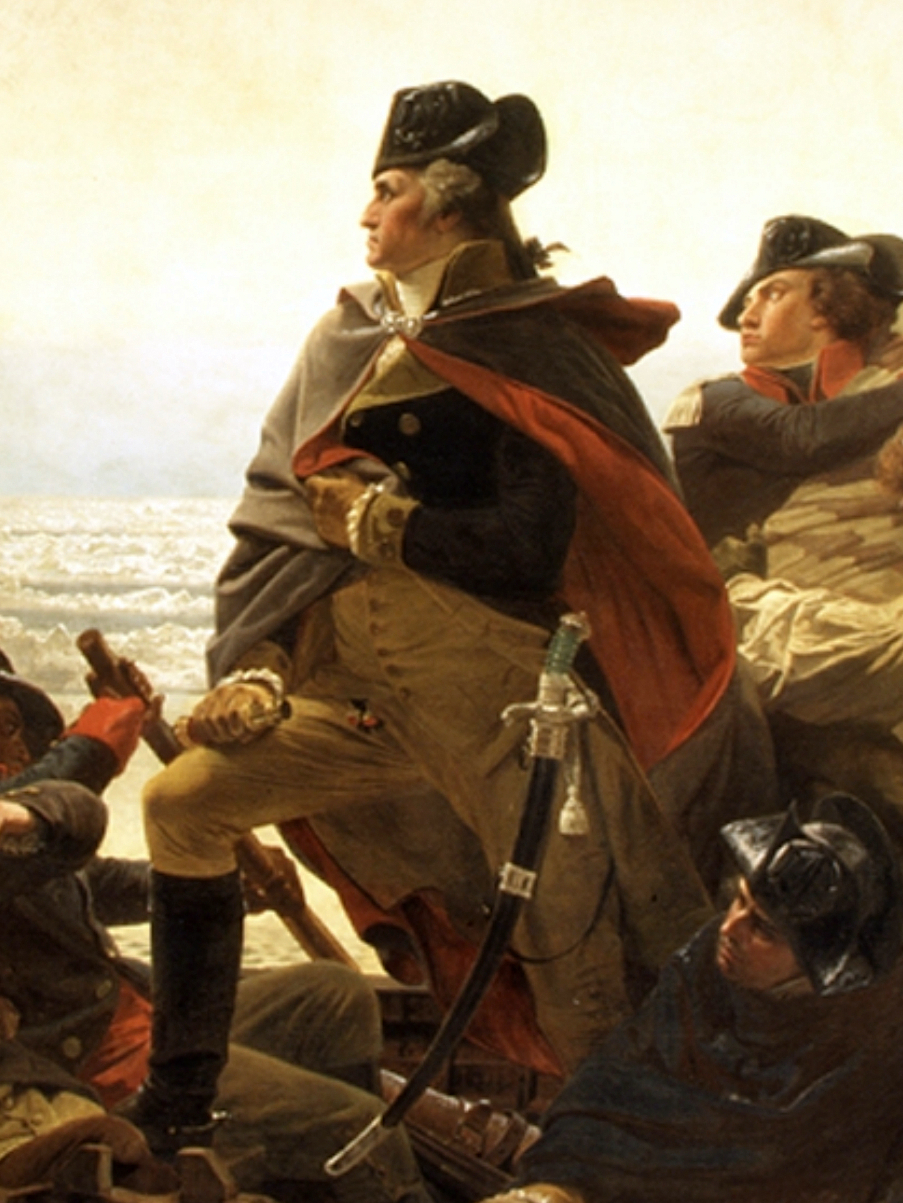
Profile from Leutze's painting

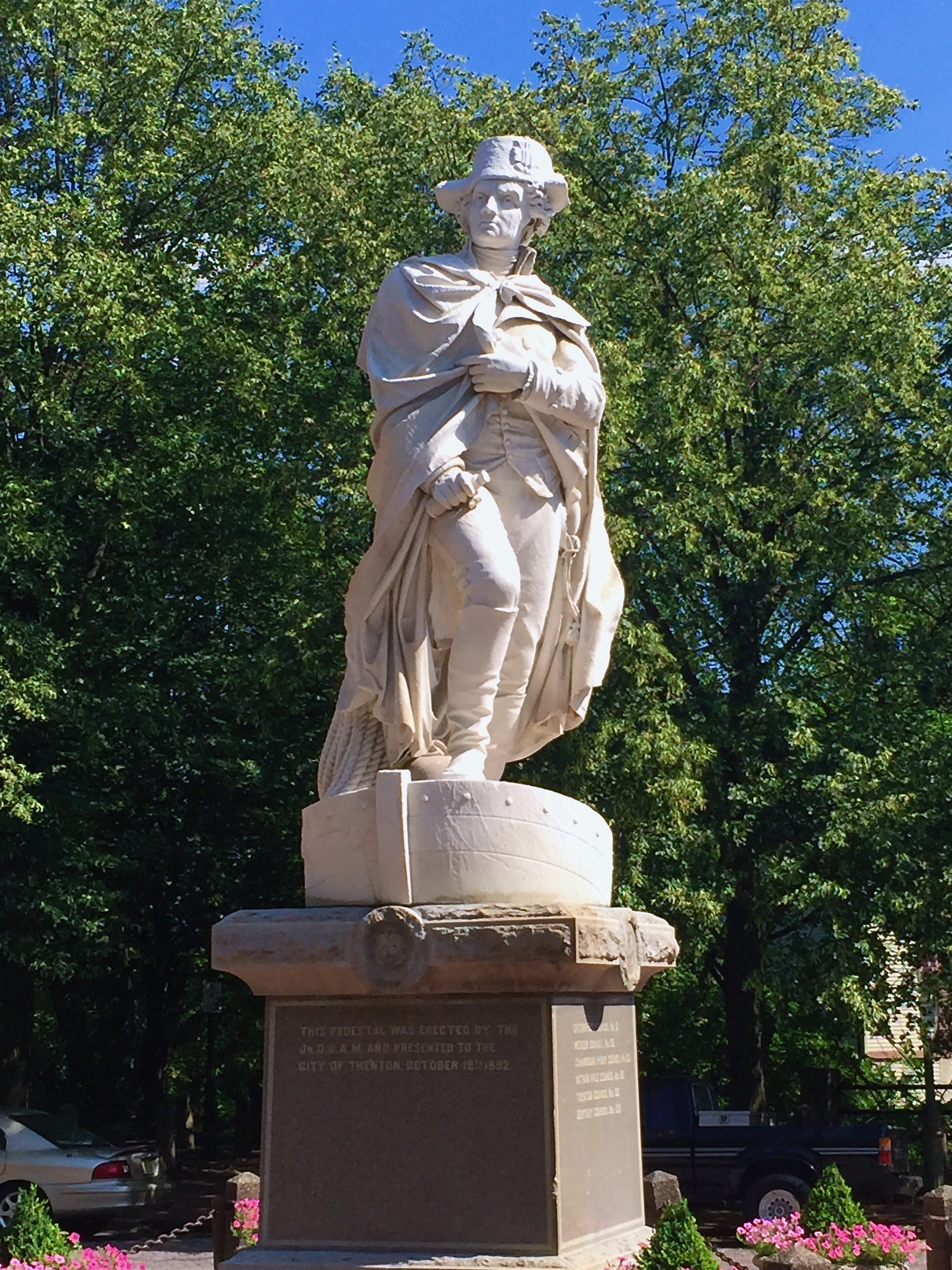
Statue with pedestal

== See also ==
- 1876 in art
- List of sculptures of presidents of the United States
- List of statues of George Washington
- New Jersey in the American Revolution
