= Mercer Street Friends Center =

Historic church in New Jersey, United States

- U.S. National Register of Historic Places
- U.S. Historic district – Contributing property
- New Jersey Register of Historic Places
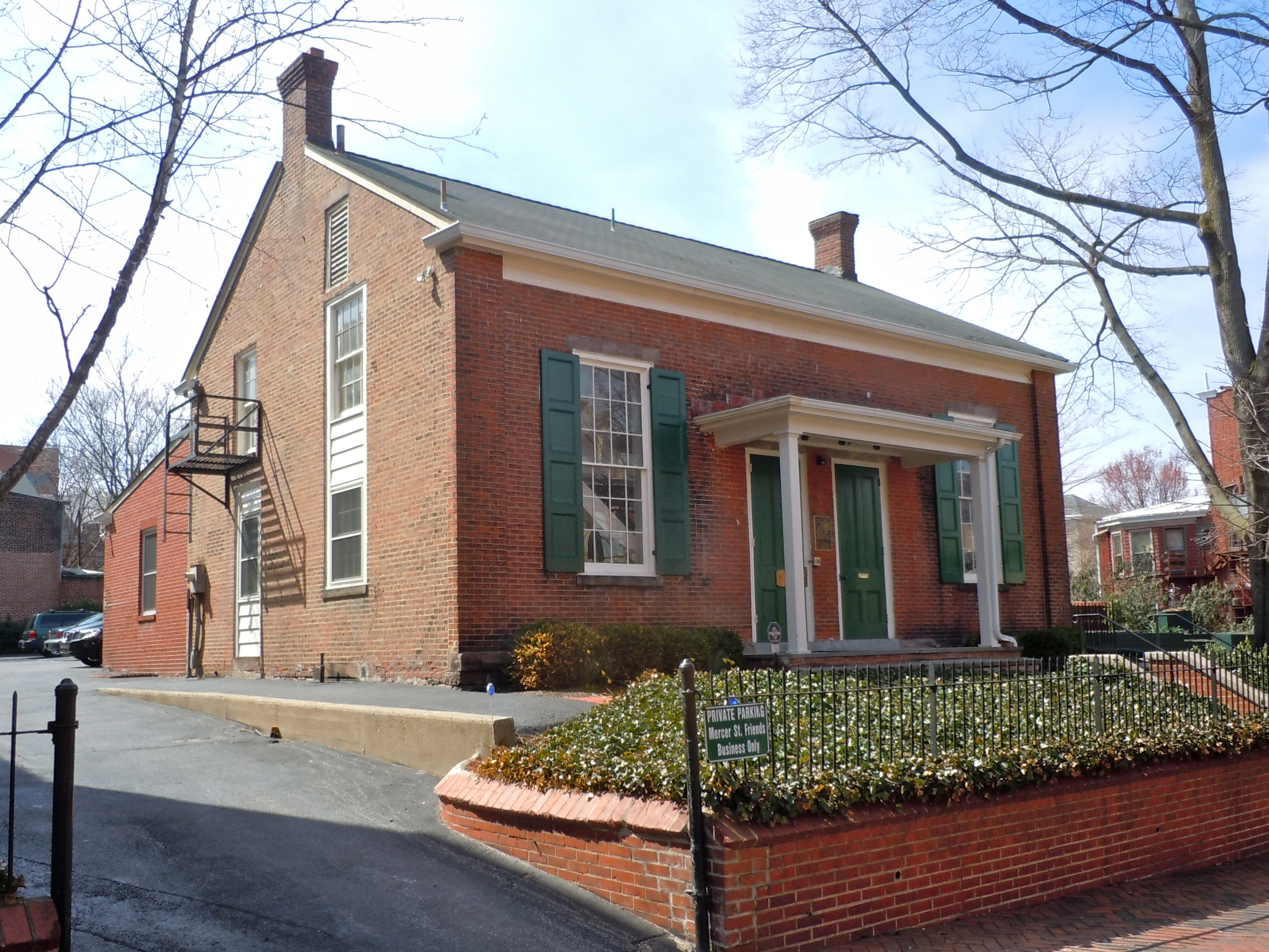

- Location within Mercer County, New Jersey Location within New Jersey Location within the United States
- Location: 151 Mercer Street; Trenton, New Jersey
- Coordinates: 40°13′2″N 74°45′40″W
- Built: 1858
- Part of: Mill Hill Historic District (ID77000880)
- NRHP reference No.: 71000505
- NJRHP No.: 1780

Significant dates
- Added to NRHP: August 12, 1971
- Designated CP: December 12, 1977
- Designated NJRHP: May 6, 1971

The Mercer Street Friends Center is located at 151 Mercer Street in the Mill Hill neighborhood of the city Trenton in Mercer County, New Jersey. Built in 1858, it was added to the National Register of Historic Places on August 12, 1971, for its significance in architecture, religion, and social history. It was added as a contributing property to the Mill Hill Historic District in 1977. It now houses the main offices of Mercer Street Friends, a Trenton-based Quaker-affiliated social service agency founded in 1958.

== History ==
When Mahlon Stacy and other Quakers arrived in the area in 1679, Trenton was known as "The Falls." Stacy was instrumental in establishing the Chesterfield Monthly Meeting in 1684, which included friends from Crosswicks and Trenton. In 1686, Quakers in what became Trenton organized the first local charity, which assisted friends who had met with misfortune. Stacy contributed corn from his mill, which gave the Mill Hill area its name. After William Trent purchased land from the Stacy family in 1714, the town was called Trent's-town, sometimes Trent-town, and finally Trenton.

In 1827, the Society of Friends in the United States divided into two major branches, one known as Orthodox or conservative, the other known as Liberal or Hicksite, after Elias Hicks. The meeting house at Hanover and Montgomery Streets in Trenton, finished in 1739, was retained by the Hicksites. The Orthodox Friends, who had been meeting in homes, started building the brick meeting house at 151 Mercer Street in 1857 and completed it in 1858.

The graveyard was always an attraction for energetic young people, and in 1917, The Sunday Times Advertiser printed the reminiscences of Howell Quigley, who remembered being one of a gang of Third Ward boys, the "turn-cap-follow-me clique," who, "on their run through the neighborhood, across the fences and yards" would disturb the sanctity of the Quaker Church lot...even climbing onto the roof of the building, in and out of the barns, over the sheds, into cellars, anywhere, everywhere, and, oh, the dare of the leaders." Another commentator from 1917 grumbled, "I wouldn’t give a two-year-old bull for the best boy ever raised on Mill Hill," a view disputed by Mr. Quigley who became one of the proprietors of the printing firm of MacCrellish & Quigley and maintained his home on Jackson Street in the Mill Hill area, where he had lived from boyhood.

In 1955, the Philadelphia Orthodox and Hicksite Friends reunited and in 1957, the Chesterfield Monthly Meeting authorized the renovation and use of the meeting house on Mercer Street for activities that would express "Friends social concerns.

== See also ==
- National Register of Historic Places listings in Mercer County, New Jersey
