= Mahlon Dickerson Eyre =

American sculptor

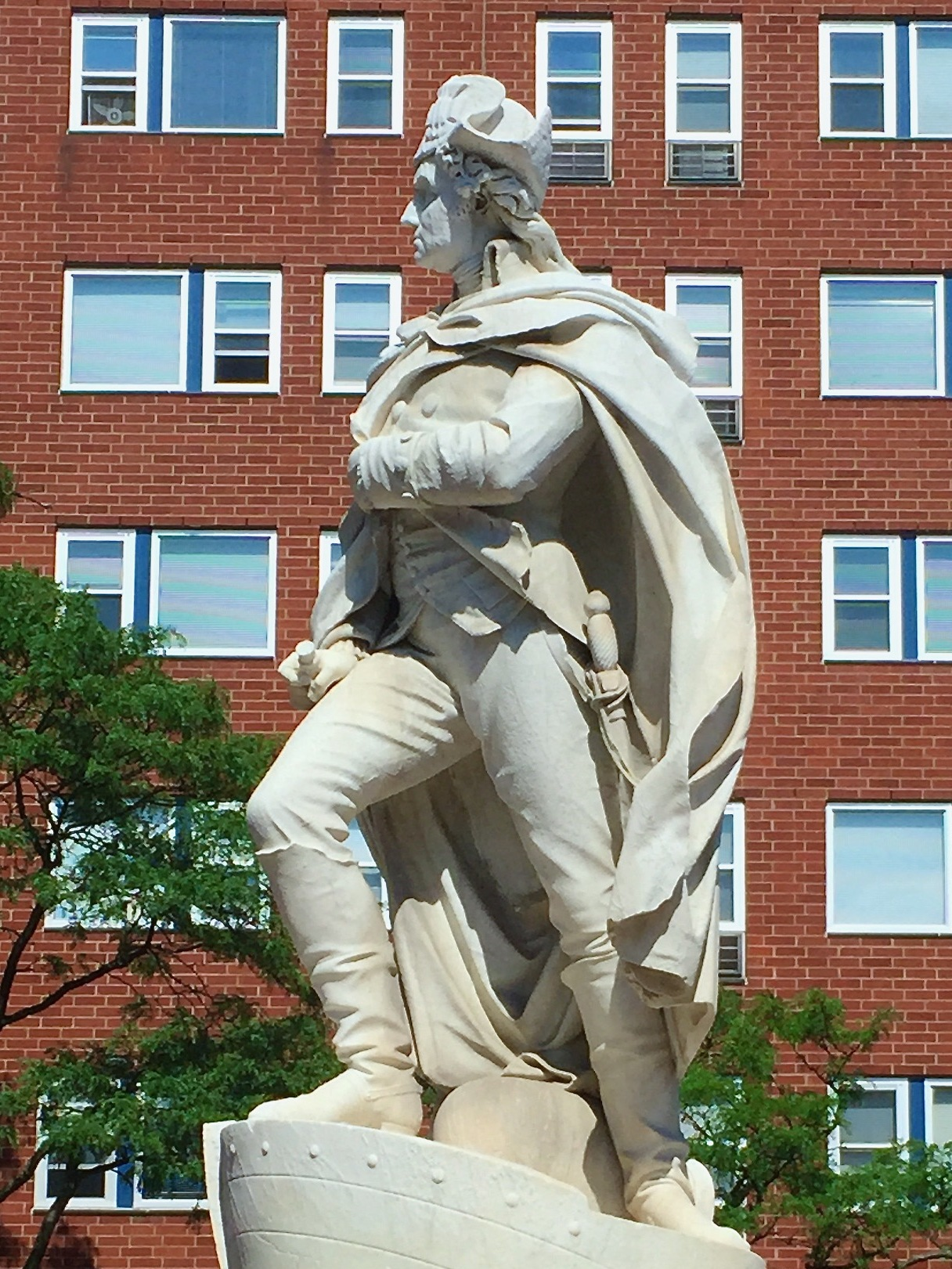
George Washington, Trenton, New Jersey.

Mahlon Dickerson Eyre (April 13, 1821 – August 28, 1882) was an American banker from Philadelphia who later lived in Florence, Italy.

Born in Philadelphia, Pennsylvania, the son of a successful merchant, he attended Princeton University. He traveled in Europe, and settled in Florence, Italy, where he met his wife Isabella. He exhibited 14 works at the 1876 Centennial Exposition in Philadelphia. One of these was a marble statuette of Hercules and Antaeus, a copy after Stefano Maderno's c. 1622-25 original.

He is best-known for owning a twice-lifesize marble statue of George Washington, depicted standing at the prow of a boat while crossing the Delaware River. The statue was carved by Fratelli Gianfranchi and was displayed at the Centennial Exposition of 1876 in Philadelphia. The statue was purchased for Trenton, New Jersey in 1889. It was installed in Cadwalader Park in 1892, and moved to the Mill Hill neighborhood of Trenton in 1976.

Eyre died in Florence. He is buried in Bagni di Lucca, Tuscany, Italy. He was an uncle of the architect Wilson Eyre.
