= Durham boat =

Wooden, flat-bottomed, double-ended freight boat

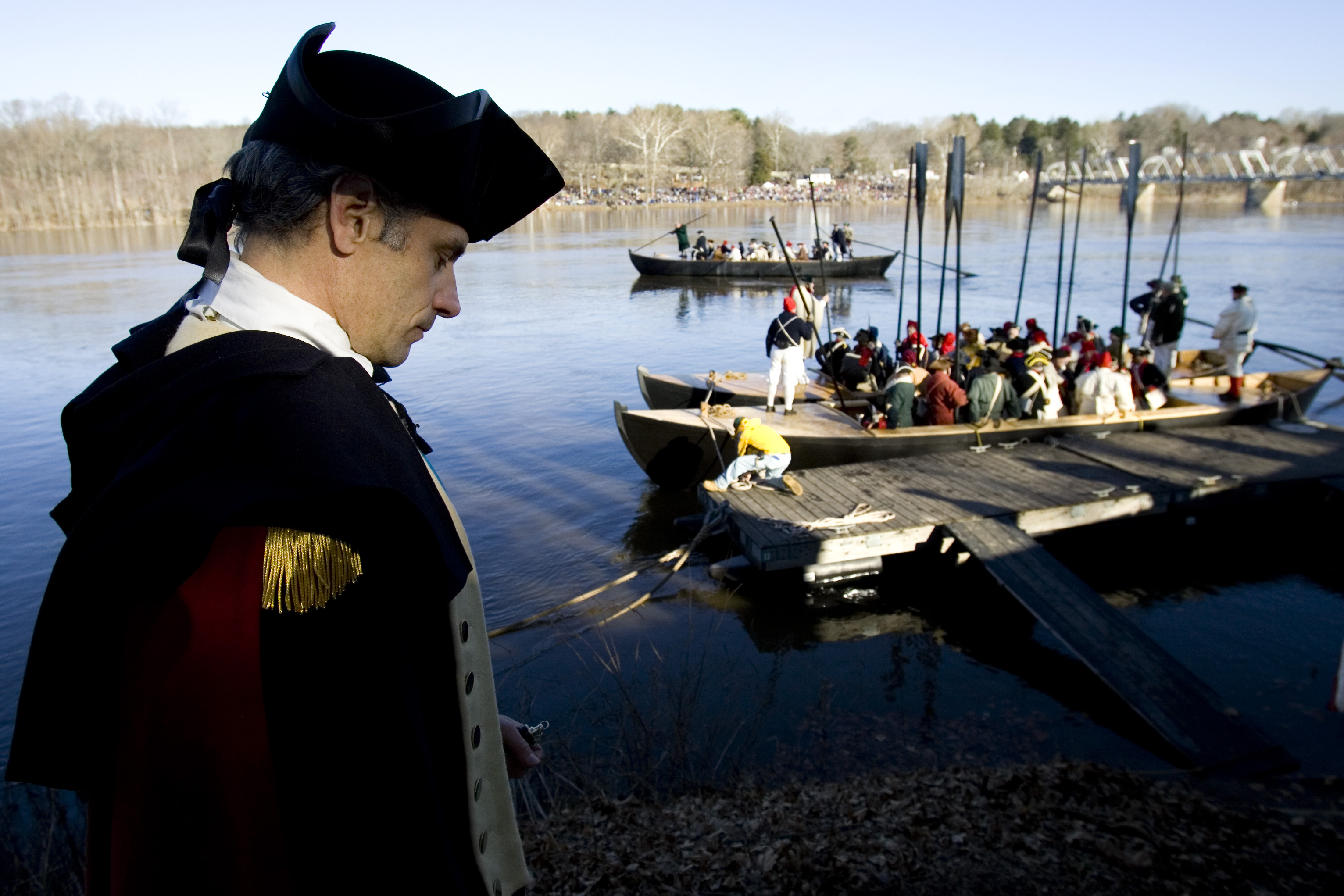
- A December 25, 2007 photo of Durham boats used in reenactment of George Washington's crossing of the Delaware River on December 25 and 26, 1776

Class overview
- Builders: various
- Operators: commercial freight haulers
- In service: c. 1750 - c. 1830

General characteristics
- Type: Durham boat
- Length: 40 ft (12 m) to 60 ft (18 m)
- Beam: 8 ft (2.4 m)
- Draught: up to 2 ft (0.61 m) when loaded
- Propulsion: setting poles, oars or sails
- Speed: varied
- Capacity: 12 to 18 tons while traveling downstream and two tons while traveling upstream
- Complement: two to four crew, plus steersman
- Armament: none
- Notes: built to ferry freight on interior waterways of North America during the eighteenth and nineteenth centuries

The Durham boat was a large wooden, flat-bottomed, double-ended freight boat used on interior waterways in North America beginning in the middle of the 18th century. They were replaced by larger, more efficient canal boats during the canal era beginning with the opening of the Erie Canal in 1825.

The Durham name became associated with this boat type due to their use by Durham Ironworks, based in Durham Township, Pennsylvania, which used them to haul freight on the Delaware River. They are also noted for their use in George Washington's crossing of the Delaware River on December 25 and 26, 1776 during the American Revolutionary War.

== Construction ==
Durham boats were flat-bottomed and double-ended, much like large bateau in both construction and appearance. Beyond that, very little is known of construction details. No plans exist and likely they were not used. No extant remains have been found and very little written description exists. It is believed that they were built with heavy stems at bow and stern and a series of frames amidships, likely from natural oak crooks when available, and planked with sawn boards, likely pine although builders would have used whatever material was available.

These boats would have varied from place to place, from builder to builder and also evolved over time, however in general, they were 40 feet (12 m) to 60 feet (18 m) long and 8 feet (2.4 m) wide. The bottoms were planked and flat, without a keel, but possibly with a larger “keel-plank” in the center. The sides were vertical and parallel, tapering to sharp at either end. Unlike the bateau, they were decked at both ends and had cleated walking boards along either side. They would have been fitted with a long “sweep” or steering oar and one mast which usually held two square sails.

== Historic use on the Delaware River ==
The Durham boat "...was the sole means of moving commodities in both directions on the river between Philadelphia and points above tide. This boat was well known on the Delaware or more than a century...even after the building of the canals, it was used on them as well as on the river to a considerable extent." They are also noted for their use in George Washington's crossing of the Delaware River during the American Revolution.

"They were used as early as 1758, by John Van Campen, for the transportation of flour to Philadelphia, manufactured from wheat grown in the Minisink."

The sides of the Delaware River Durhams were vertical with a slight curvature to meet a similar curvature of the bottom which was otherwise flat. The sides were straight and parallel until they began to curve to the stem and stern posts, about twelve or fourteen feet from the ends, where the decks began, the rest of the boat being open.

The usual length was 60 feet (18 m) although shorter boats were built and in some cases, the length was extended to 66 feet (20 m) with sometimes a foot or two added to the normal 8 feet (2.4 m) width. The usual depth was 42 inches (110 cm) with an additional 10 inches (25 cm) of height at the ends. The boats were shallow draft, 3.5 to 5 inches (9 to 13 cm) empty and 28 inches (70 cm) loaded. They normally carried from 15 to 18 tons downstream and 2 tons upstream.

On the Delaware, the usual crew was three men. Movement downstream was by the current with occasional use of two 18 feet (5 m) oars. The boat was propelled upstream by the use of 12 to 18 feet (4 to 5 m) iron-shod setting poles. twelve inches (30 cm) wide “walking-boards” ran the length of the boat on either side. Crew members set their poles on the bottom of the river and walked from the forward end of the boat to the stern, driving the boat forward. The captain, who steered, held the boat from going back with the current with a pole while the crew returned to repeat the process.

At one time, there were reportedly several hundred Durham boats on the Delaware River. They sometimes traveled in groups as large as twenty-five so that the crews could aid each other. One observer recalled sitting on the river bank watching a number of Durham boats waiting for a favorable wind, and when a breeze came up, “…off they would go like a flock of sheep.”

== Use on the Mohawk River ==
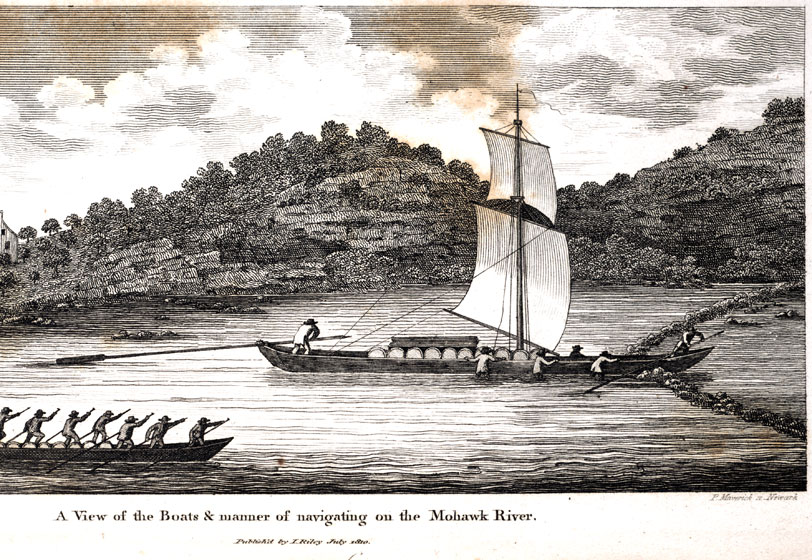
An 1807 drawing of a Durham boat with sails traveling on the Mohawk River, a tributary to the Hudson River, as it passes through a V-shaped rock wing dam similar to eel weirs constructed by Native Americans

The Mohawk River, a tributary of the Hudson River in New York state, was smaller and shallower than the Delaware, and Durham boats were not introduced until much later, probably not until 1795 when the Western Inland Lock Navigation Company completed navigational improvements. Prior to that, freight on the Mohawk went by bateaux and Schenectady boat, which was a smaller and lighter version of the Durham.

Durhams on the Mohawk differed somewhat from those on the Delaware River, primarily in that they had flat bottoms rather than the partly rounded bottoms of the Delaware River boats. “…the Schenectady Durham, which is described as flat bottom, straight sides, with easy lines at bow and stern, to help flotation in striking a rapid. She was decked fore and aft and along her gunwales, which were cleated to give foothold to the boatmen. A mast was stepped near the bow with square sails."

From 1803 to 1820, Durham boats were the watercraft of choice on the waterway for traffic between the Hudson River and Lake Ontario via the Mohawk River.

The eastern terminus of the waterway was in Schenectady, New York, and Durham boats were also known as Schenectady boats in this region.

The waterway was the major one connecting the eastern seaboard of the United States to the continental interior. The improvements to it that made the use of Durham boats practicable were an important prelude to the construction of the Erie Canal. Durham boats aren't designed as canal boats, and their era on the Mohawk River largely ended with the canal's opening in 1825.

== Use on the Niagara River and Lake Erie ==
Durham boats replaced the use of bateaux on the Niagara River. Porter Barton & Co. ran them on a regular schedule carrying salt from Little Niagara (Fort Schlosser) to Black Rock beginning about 1805. At least one Durham boat “of about ten tons burthen” was reported built at the Black Rock shipyard on the Niagara River in 1809.

In 1810, a “salt boat” with a crew of four bound to Black Rock with 150 barrels of salt was upset and drifted down the river, and went over the falls. Three of the four crew members were lost. In another well-known incident, Captain Daniel Dobbins used an “old Durham boat” to transport two cannon each weighing 6300 pounds from Black Rock to Presque Isle to supply Commodore Perry’s fleet in the Battle of Lake Erie, "...when it was discovered she was leaking very much from the heavy rolling and heavy weight in her bottom, and likely to split open and founder, Mr. Dobbins took a coil of rope they had on board, and securing one end forward, passed the rope round and round her fore and aft, heaving each turn taut with a gunner’s handspike; and in this way, kept her together and afloat, all hands bailing."

During the period 1796 to 1820, “open boats” were in use on Lake Erie. These boats were used to carry cargo and passengers, usually between Buffalo and Detroit and places between. They traveled along the shore and sought shelter in the mouth of the nearest creek in the event of bad weather. These boats were never specifically described, but they were sometimes referred to as Schenectady boats or Durham boats.

The use of Durham boats on the Niagara River ended immediately in 1825 when the Porter Barton & Co. monopoly of the Niagara Falls portage was made worthless by the opening of the Erie Canal.

== Use on the St. Lawrence River ==
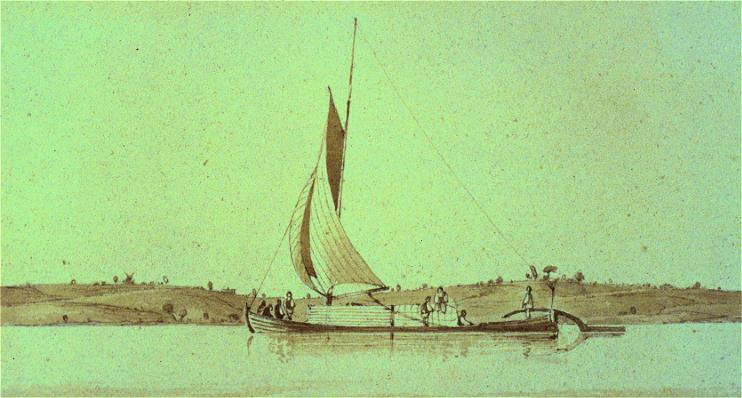
An 1831 watercolor painting of a Durham boat under sail on the St. Lawrence River

The Durham boat was introduced on the St. Lawrence River in 1809 by Americans who brought them from the Mohawk River.

By 1816, regular passenger service by Durham boat had been established between Schenectady and Montreal. From the Montreal Herald of June 2, 1816, "Among the objects which attract public notice, we were the other day struck with the appearance of a handsome Durham boat of the ordinary size, or of about 250 bbls. Burthen. She was not intended for freight, but for passengers; she had a substantial roundhouse, 20 feet in length by 8 in width, well fitted up with sides of painted canvas, such as stagecoaches have; sixteen or twenty passengers can be tolerably accommodated in this boat."

The Durham on the St. Lawrence was described as "a flat bottomed barge with a keel or centre board with a rounded bow with a length from eighty to ninety feet with a breadth of beam from nine to ten feet with a carrying capacity of ten times that of the batteau. In 1835 there were 800 Durham boats and 1500 batteaux engaged in the navigation of Lake Ontario and the St Lawrence river."

== Use in other locations ==
Durham boats were used in commercial trade on the Fox River between Green Bay, Wisconsin and Fort Winnebago. Their use on this waterway was pioneered by John W. Arndt in 1825. In the 1830s, Daniel Whitney, who had a lead shot tower in Helena on the Wisconsin River downstream from the portage at the fort, tried to organize transit for lead shot via the Great Lakes to markets in New York, but while the Durham boats were ideal for their task on the Fox River, the overall operation was too complex to compete with other means.

Durham boats on the Woolastook (Saint John River) were used to supply colonial military installations and support colonial settlements in the late 18th C. "these were a clumsy, wall sided boat, carrying a considerable burthen, but drawing much water and requiring great labour to work them, being manned with a larger complement of men, who propelled them with poles, and towed them thro' the rapids with ropes. A trip on one of these boats from Fredericton to the Great Falls took up nearly a month in going and returning. To these succeeded what are called Tobique boats, which are a flat bateaux, carrying a good load and requiring a small depth of water.

== Modern Replicas ==
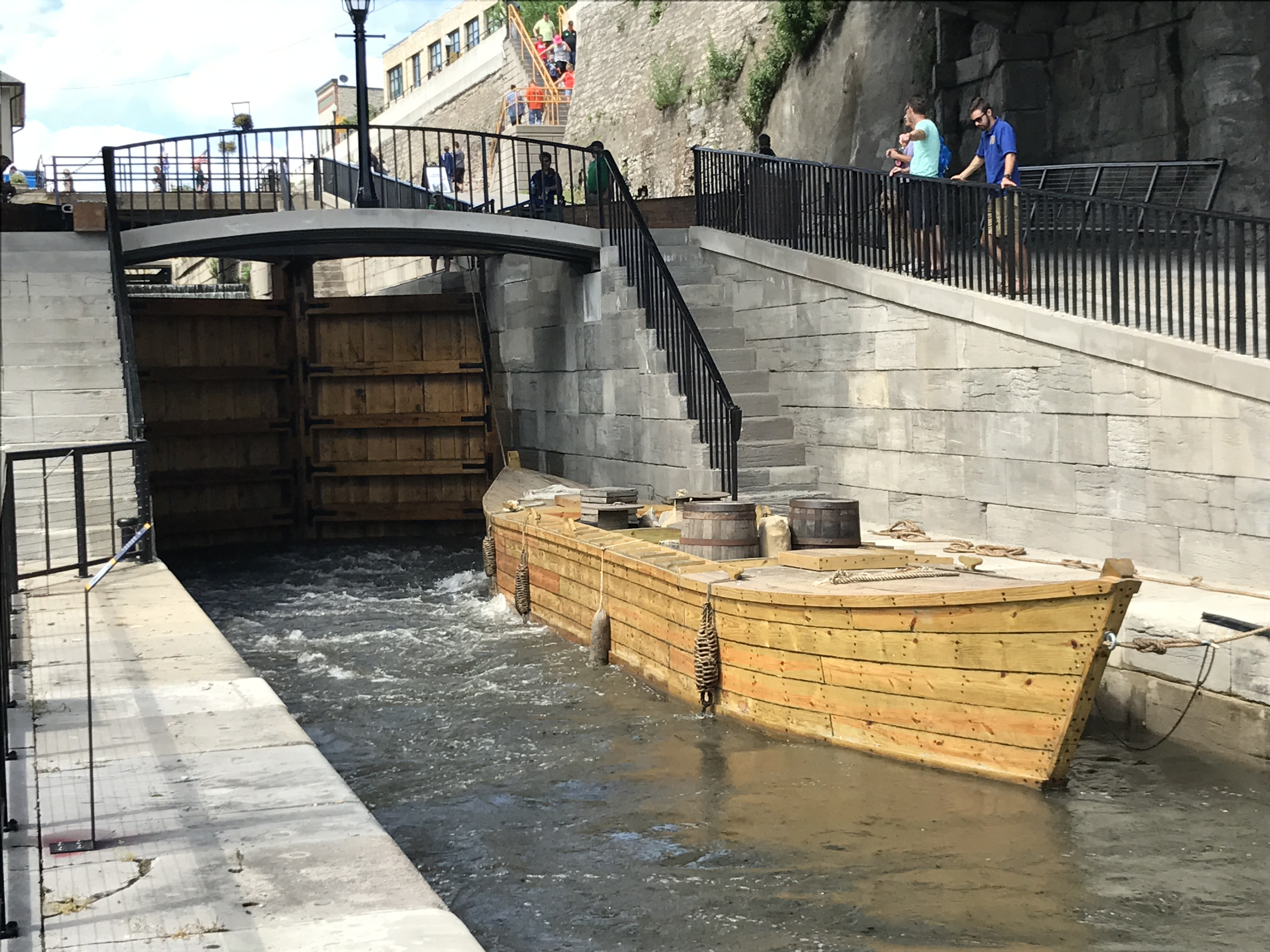
A replica of a Durham boat, the Erie Traveler, in flight locks in Lockport, New York

A series of modern replicas were built to be used in annual reenactments of Washington's historic crossing of the Delaware River over the night of December 25 and 26, 1776 during the American Revolutionary War. Five are stored at the Washington Crossing Historic Park in Upper Makefield Township, Pennsylvania. A sixth is on display on the green next to the Durham Post Office on Durham Road in Durham, Pennsylvania.

The Endurance was a replica Durham boat built by Parks Canada and the National Capital Commission in Ottawa in 1983. It was scrapped in 2006 except for the bow section, which remains on display at Rideau Canal Visitor Centre in Smiths Falls, Ontario.

The Erie Traveler is a 51 feet (16 m) long, 7 feet (2 m) wide Durham boat replica built during 2016-2017 by staff and volunteers of the Buffalo Maritime Center for the Locks Heritage District Corporation for demonstration purposes along the canal in Lockport.

== See also ==
- Bateau
  - James River bateau
- Barge
- Wood Creek
