= George Washington's crossing of the Delaware River =

1776 surprise attack against Hessian forces

Coordinates: 40°18′0″N 74°52′24″W

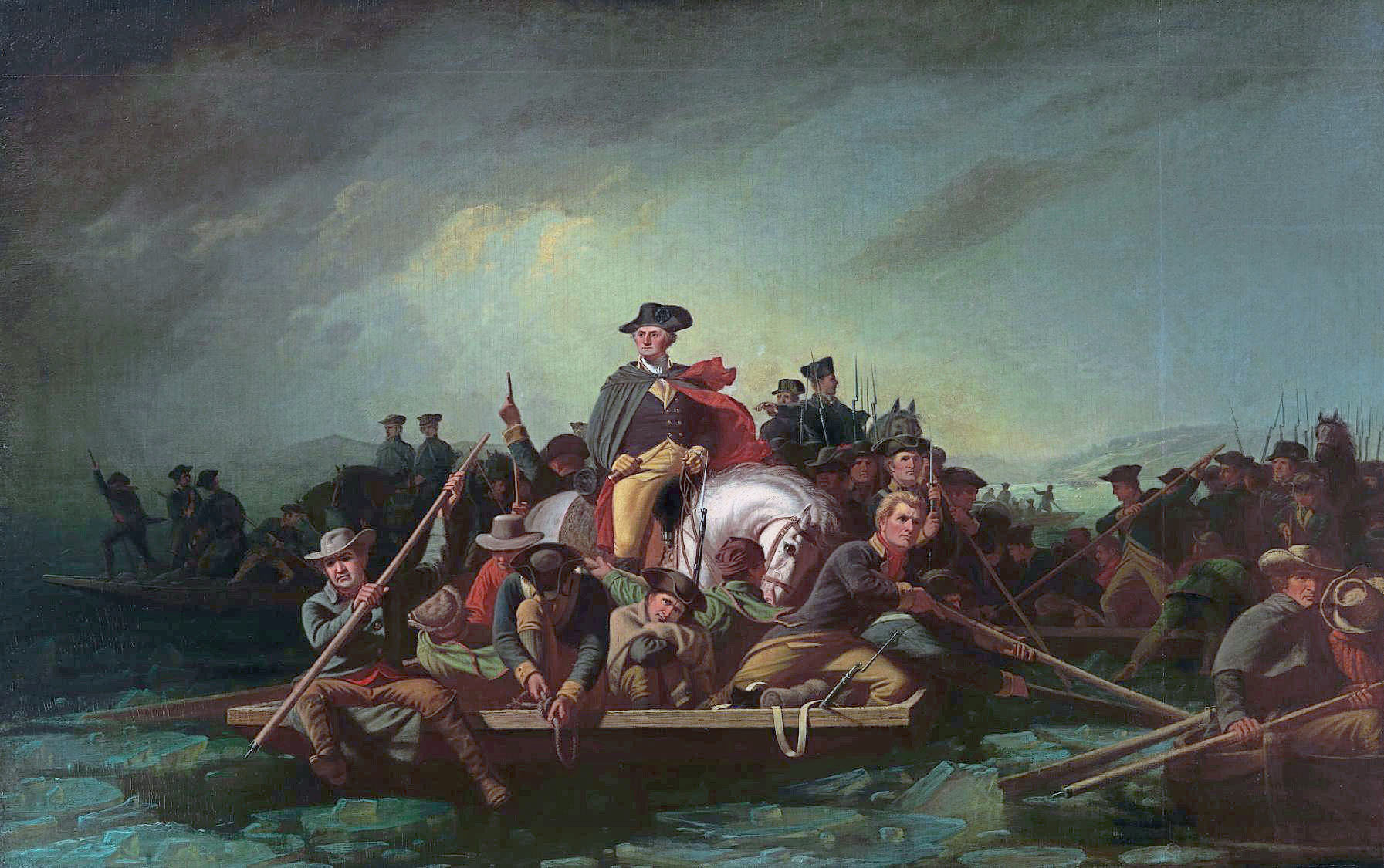
- Washington Crossing the Delaware, a 19th century painting by George Caleb Bingham depicting Washington and Continental Army troops crossing the river prior to the Battle of Trenton on the morning of December 26, 1776
- Date: Night of December 25–26, 1776
- Location: Washington Crossing, Pennsylvania, U.S.
- Participants: Continental Army led by George Washington
- Outcome: Battle of Trenton

George Washington's crossing of the Delaware River (New Jersey)

George Washington's crossing of the Delaware River, on the night of December 25–26, 1776, during the American Revolutionary War, was the first move in a complex and surprise military maneuver organized by George Washington, the commander-in-chief of the Continental Army, which culminated in their attack on Hessian forces garrisoned at Trenton. Washington and his troops successfully attacked the Hessian forces in the Battle of Trenton on the morning of December 26, 1776.

The military campaign was organized in great secrecy by Washington, who led a column of Continental Army troops from today's Bucks County, Pennsylvania across the icy Delaware River to today's Mercer County, New Jersey in what was one of the Revolutionary War's most logistically challenging and dangerous clandestine operations. Other planned crossings in support of the operation were either called off or ineffective, but this did not prevent Washington from surprising and defeating the Hessian troops encamped in Trenton under the command of Johann Rall. After prevailing in the Battle of Trenton, Washington and his Continental Army troops crossed the Delaware River again, returning to Pennsylvania west-bound with Hessian prisoners and military stores taken in the battle.

Washington's army then crossed the Delaware River a third time at the end of 1776 under difficult circumstances by the uncertain thickness of the ice on the river. They defeated British reinforcements under Lord Cornwallis at Trenton on January 2, 1777, and were also triumphant over his rear guard at Princeton the following day prior to retreating to his winter quarters in Morristown, New Jersey. As a celebrated location and development in the ultimately victorious Revolutionary War, the unincorporated communities of Washington Crossing, Pennsylvania and Washington Crossing, New Jersey are both named in honor of Washington and the logistically complicated covert crossing of the Delaware River.

== Background information ==
Although 1776 started well for Washington and the Continental Army with the evacuation of British troops from Boston in March, attempts to defend New York City from the British were unsuccessful. British General William Howe and his troops landed on Long Island in August and pushed Washington's Continental Army completely out of New York by mid-November, when he captured the remaining troops on Manhattan.

The main force of British troops returned to New York for the winter season, and they left their allied Hessian troops in New Jersey under the command of Colonels Rall and Von Donop. Both colonels were ordered to form small outposts in and around Trenton. Howe then sent troops under the command of Charles Cornwallis across the Hudson River, where they chased Washington and his troops across New Jersey.

Washington's army was shrinking because of expiring enlistments and desertions. The remaining troops were suffering from poor morale because of the defeats in the New York area. Most of Washington's army crossed the Delaware River into Pennsylvania north of Trenton, and destroyed or moved to the western shore all boats for miles in both directions.

Rather than attempting to immediately chase Washington further, Cornwallis, under Howe's orders, established a chain of New Jersey outposts from New Brunswick to Burlington, including one at Bordentown and one at Trenton, and ordered his troops to bunker there in winter quarters. The British were happy to end the campaign season when they were ordered to winter quarters. This was a time for the generals to regroup, resupply, and strategize for the upcoming campaign season the following spring.

== Washington's army ==
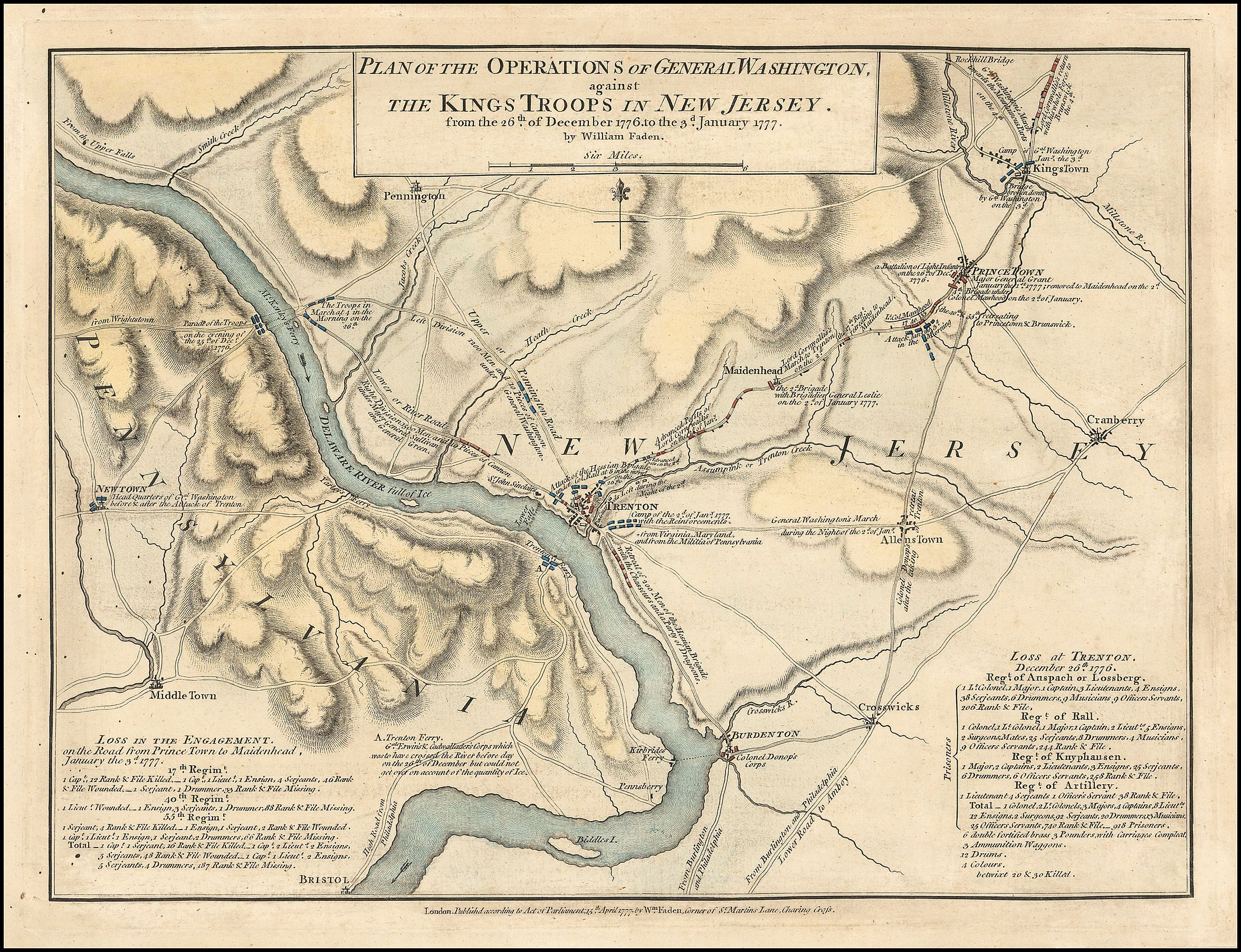
A 1777 map of the Delaware River area by William Faden depicting the route Washington and his Continental Army troops made during the complex and covert crossing of the river.

Washington encamped his Continental Army near McConkey's Ferry in present-day Upper Makefield Township, not far from the crossing site. Washington at first took quarters across the river from Trenton, but on December 15 he moved his headquarters to the home of William Keith in present-day Upper Makefield Township so he was closer to his forces. When Washington's army first arrived at McConkey's Ferry, the Continental Army had between 4,000 and 6,000 men, but approximately 1,700 were unfit for duty and needed hospital care. In the retreat across New Jersey, Washington lost precious supplies and also lost contact with two important divisions of the Continental Army.

Two of Washington's top generals were potentially poised to aid Washington in the crossing and attack. Horatio Gates was in the Hudson River Valley. Charles Lee was in western New Jersey, where he had 2,000 Continental Army troops under his command. Washington ordered both generals to join him, but Gates was delayed by heavy snows in transit to McConkey's Ferry, and Lee, who did not have a high opinion of Washington, delayed following repeated orders, and remained on the British flank near Morristown.

Other problems hampered Washington's forces. Many of his troops' enlistments were due to expire at the end of 1776, then only a week away, and many of them were inclined to leave the Continental Army when their commission ended. Several Continental Army troops deserted prior to expiration of their enlistment commitment.

The pending loss of forces, the series of lost battles, the loss of New York, and the resulting flight of the Continental Army and many New Yorkers from the British, led some in the Second Continental Congress in Philadelphia to begin doubting the war's direction under Washington's leadership. But Washington persisted, successfully procuring supplies and dispatching men to recruit new members for the Continental Army, which was successful partly because of British and Hessian soldiers' drunken behavior while in New Jersey and Pennsylvania.

The losses at Fort Lee placed a heavy toll on Washington and the Continental Army. When they evacuated their forts, they were forced to leave behind critical supplies and munitions. Many troops were killed or taken prisoner, and the morale of the remaining troops suffered even further. Few believed that Washington and the Continental Army could win the war and gain independence.

=== Publication of The American Crisis ===
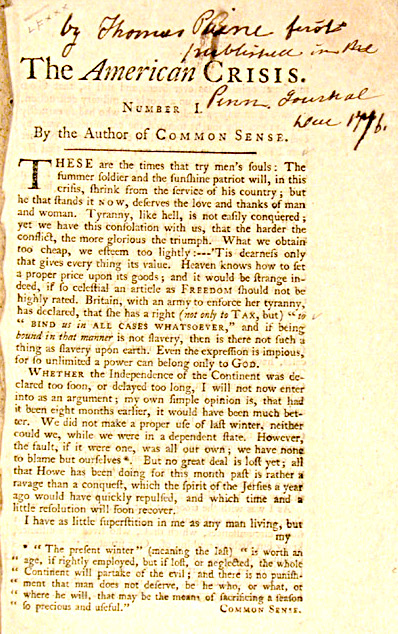
The cover of Thomas Paine's The American Crisis, published the week before Washington's covert crossing of the Delaware, infused a much-needed sense of optimism into Continental Army troops, who were beginning to doubt their ability to prevail militarily against the British Army, then the largest and most powerful army in the world. It also inspired delegates in the Second Continental Congress, who were troubled by recent Continental Army military defeats.

On December 19, 1776, just a week prior to Washington's covert crossing of the Delaware River, the morale of the Continental Army was lifted by the publication of The American Crisis, a pamphlet authored by Thomas Paine, the author of Common Sense. In The American Crisis, Paine wrote the famed phrase:

These are the times that try men's souls; the summer soldier and the sunshine patriot will, in this crisis, shrink from the service of his country; but he that stands it now, deserves the love and thanks of man and woman. Tyranny, like hell, is not easily conquered; yet we have this consolation with us, that the harder the conflict, the more glorious the triumph.

The day following its publication in Philadelphia, Washington ordered all his troops to read it. In The American Crisis, Paine encouraged the soldiers to look more optimistically at their prospects for victory. The pamphlet also enhanced public understanding across the Thirteen Colonies of the challenging conditions confronting the Continental Army but arguing that victory was possible and necessary.

=== Reinforcements arrive ===
On December 20, General Lee's division of 2,000 troops arrived in Washington's camp under the command of General John Sullivan. Lee was captured by the British on December 12, when he ventured too far outside the protection of his troops in search of more comfortable lodgings. Later that day, Gates' division arrived in camp, which by then included only 600 Continental Army forces following the end of many enlistments, to secure the northern frontier.

With these reinforcements and a smaller number of local volunteers who joined his forces, Washington's forces totaled about 6,000 troops fit for duty. This total was then reduced by a large portion because some forces were detailed to guard the ferries at Dunk's Ferry, currently bordered by present-day Neshaminy State Park in Bensalem Township, Pennsylvania and New Hope, Pennsylvania. Another group was sent to protect supplies at Newtown, Pennsylvania, and to guard the sick and wounded who had to remain behind as the Continental Army began crossing the Delaware River. This left Washington with about 2,400 men able to take offensive action against the Hessian and British troops in and around Trenton.

The Continental Army's morale was boosted further by the arrival of some provisions, including much-needed blankets, on December 24.

== Planning the attack ==
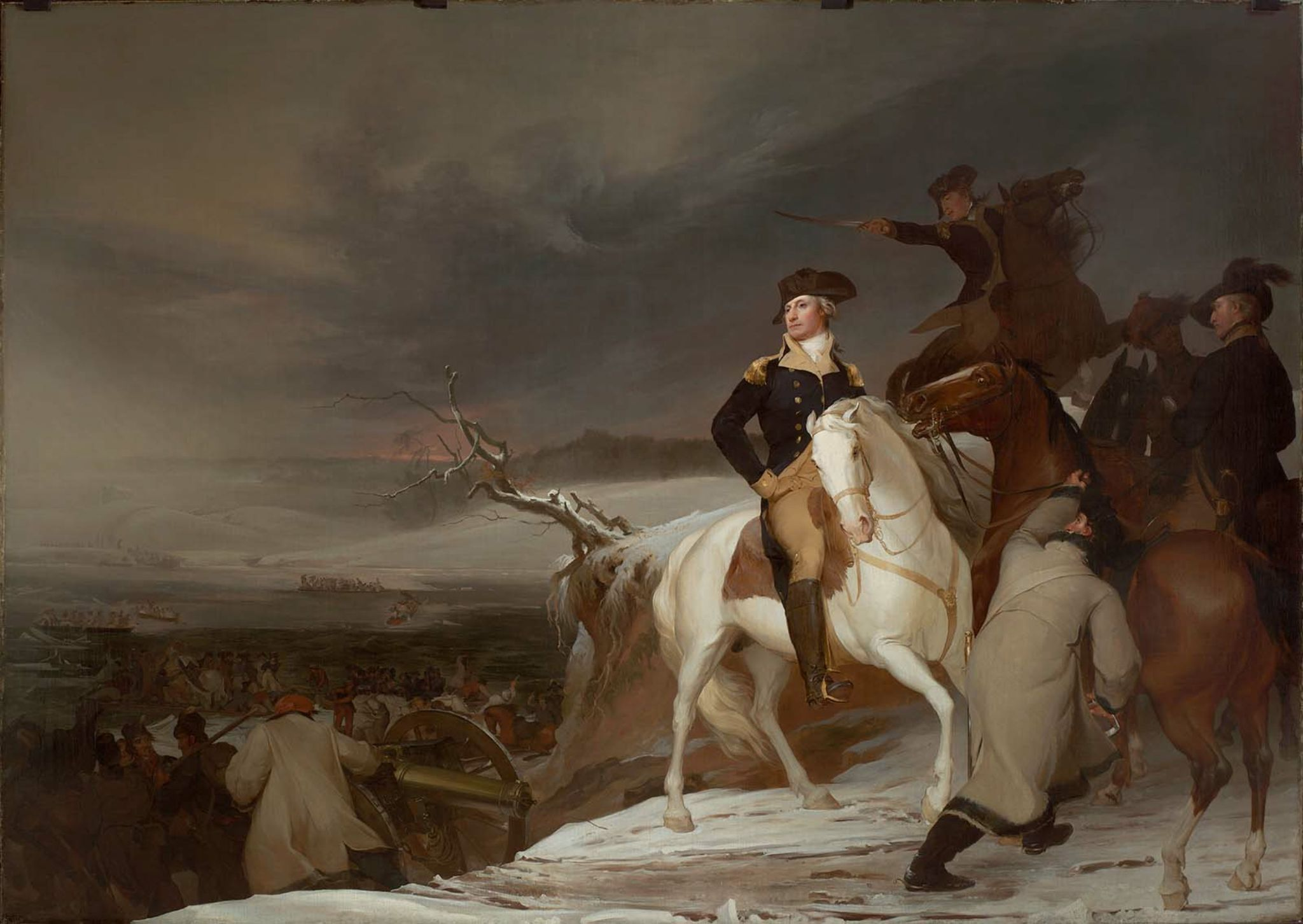
The Passage of the Delaware, an 1819 portrait depicting the crossing by Thomas Sully

Washington was considering some form of bold maneuver since arriving in Pennsylvania. Washington first considered an attack on the southernmost British positions near Mount Holly, where a Continental Army militia force had gathered. He sent his adjutant Joseph Reed to meet with Samuel Griffin, the militia's commander. Reed arrived in Mount Holly on December 22, and found Griffin to be ill and his men in relatively poor condition, but willing to undertake some form of military diversion. They did this at the Battle of Iron Works Hill the next day, drawing the Hessians at Bordentown far enough south that they would be unable to come to the assistance of the Trenton garrison. The intelligence gathered by Reed and others led Washington to abandon the idea of attacking at Mount Holly, and he began focusing instead on targeting the Hessian garrison in Trenton.

On December 23, Washington announced to his staff that he had decided to attack Trenton just prior to sunrise on December 26. Washington told Reed that "dire necessity" justified the risky assault, which included the logistically complicated task of crossing the Delaware River.

Washington's final plan included plans for three crossings of the river, with his troops, the largest contingent, to lead the attack on Trenton. A second column under Cadwalader was to cross at Dunk's Ferry and create a diversion to the south. A third column under Brigadier General James Ewing was to cross at Trenton Ferry and hold the bridge across the Assunpink Creek, just south of Trenton, in order to prevent the enemy's escape by that route. Once Trenton was secure, the combined Continental Army would move against the British posts in Princeton and New Brunswick. A planned fourth crossing, by men provided by General Israel Putnam to assist Cadwalader, was aborted after Putnam indicated that he did not feel he had enough men fit for such a military operation.

Preparations for the attack began immediately, on December 23. The following day, on December 24, boats were used to begin bringing the Continental Army across the Delaware from New Jersey were brought down from Malta Island near present-day New Hope, Pennsylvania. The boats were hidden behind Taylor Island at McConkey's Ferry, Washington's planned crossing site, and security was tightened at and around the crossing. A final planning meeting took place that day, with all of the general officers present. Washington outlined the detailed plans for the crossing of the river and planned attacks on the Hessians in Trenton on December 25, 1776

== Watercraft ==
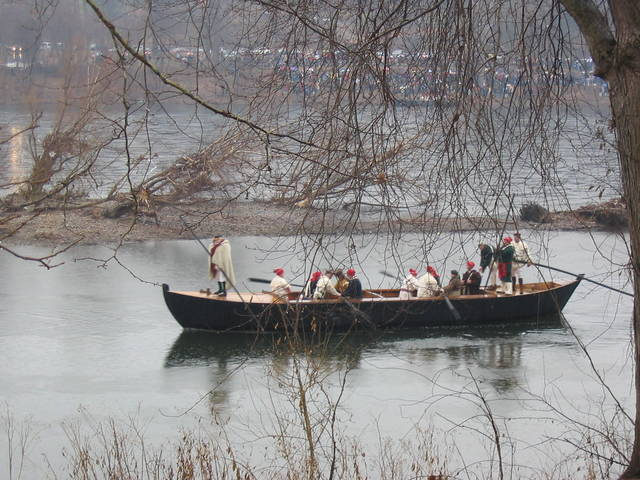
Reenactors cross the Delaware in Durham boats on December 25, 2005

A wide variety of watercraft were assembled for the crossing of the Delaware River, primarily through the work of militia men from surrounding counties in New Jersey and Pennsylvania with assistance from the Pennsylvania Navy.

Captain Daniel Bray, along with Captain Jacob Gearhart and Captain Jacob Ten Eyck, were chosen by Washington to take charge of the boats used in the crossing, supervising the transport of infantry, cavalry, and cannon. In addition to the large ferry vessels, which were big enough to carry large coaches, and likely served for carrying horses and artillery during the crossing, a large number of Durham boats were used to transport soldiers across the river. These boats were designed to carry heavy loads from the Durham Iron Works, featured high sides and a shallow draft, and could be poled across the river.

The boats were operated by experienced watermen, including John Glover's Marblehead Regiment, a company of experienced seamen from Marblehead, Massachusetts. These men were joined by seamen, dockworkers, and shipbuilders from Philadelphia and local ferry operators and boatsmen who knew the Delaware River well, including Kirby Francis Kane from Rhode Island.

== Crossing ==
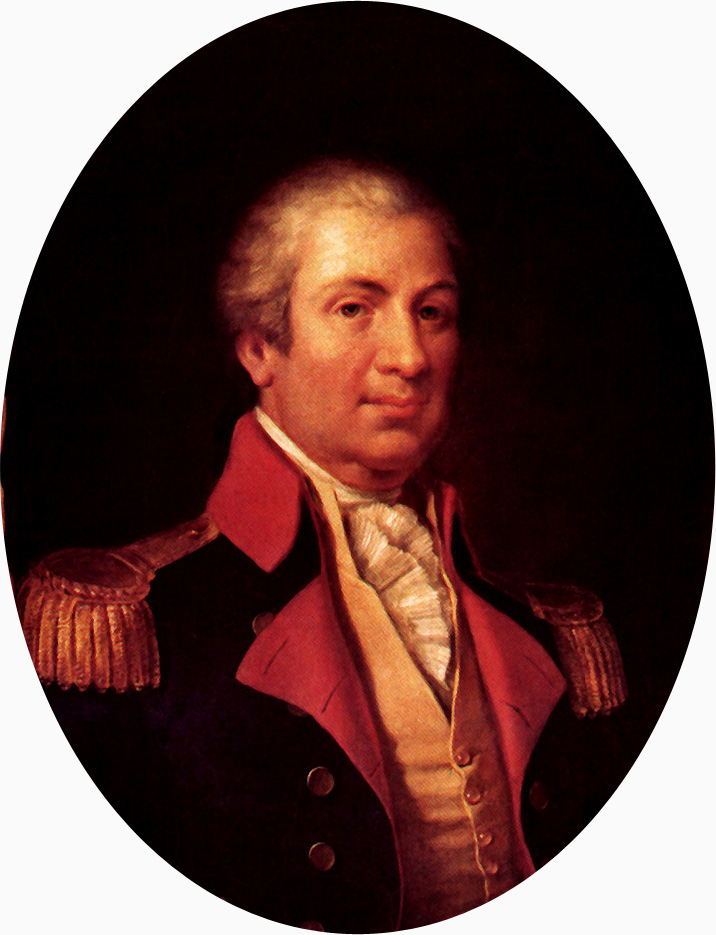
Henry Knox, Washington's chief of artillery

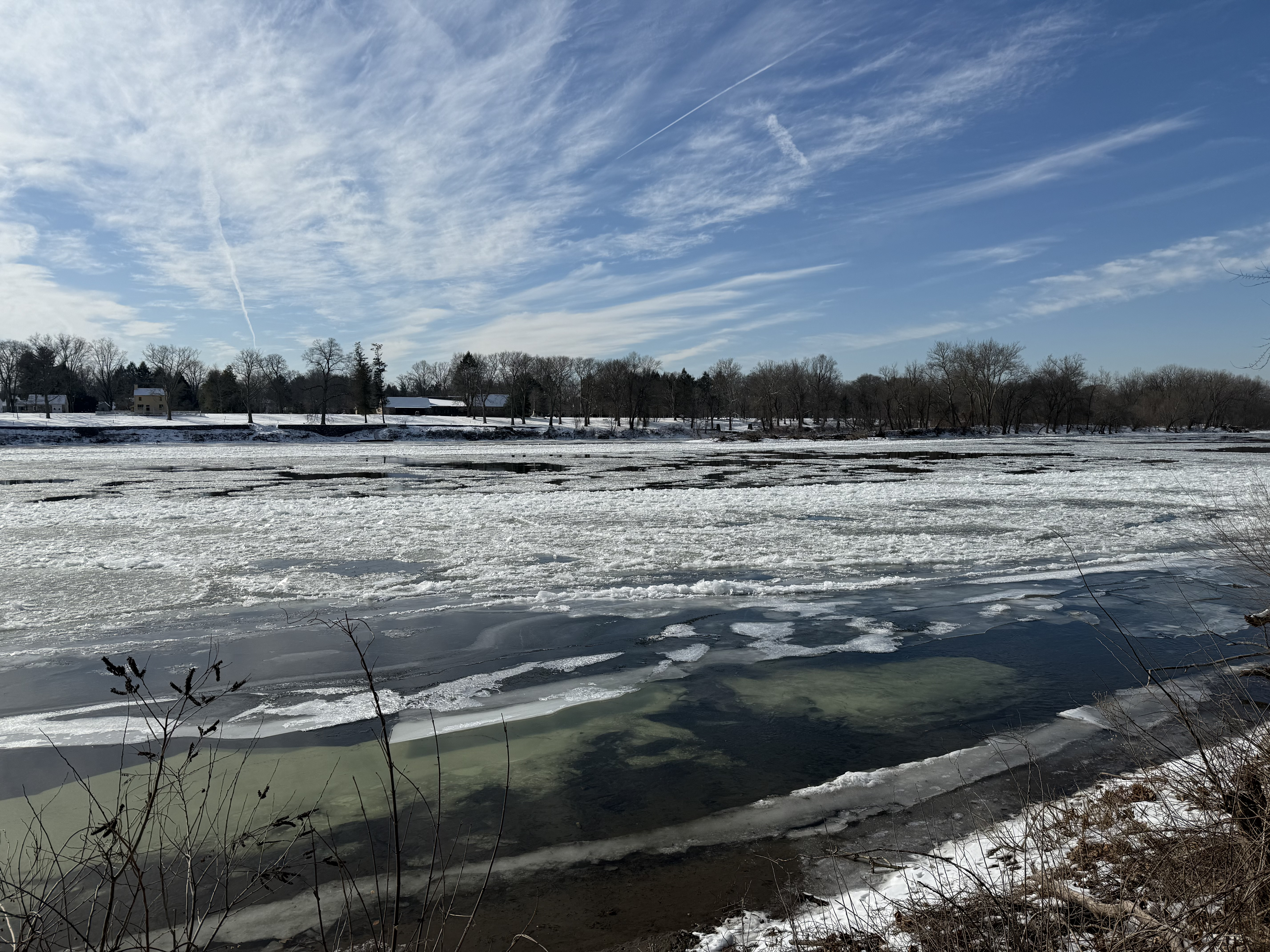
An icy Delaware River at the crossing point in January 2025, showing conditions likely similar to the ones Washington faced on the night of the attack

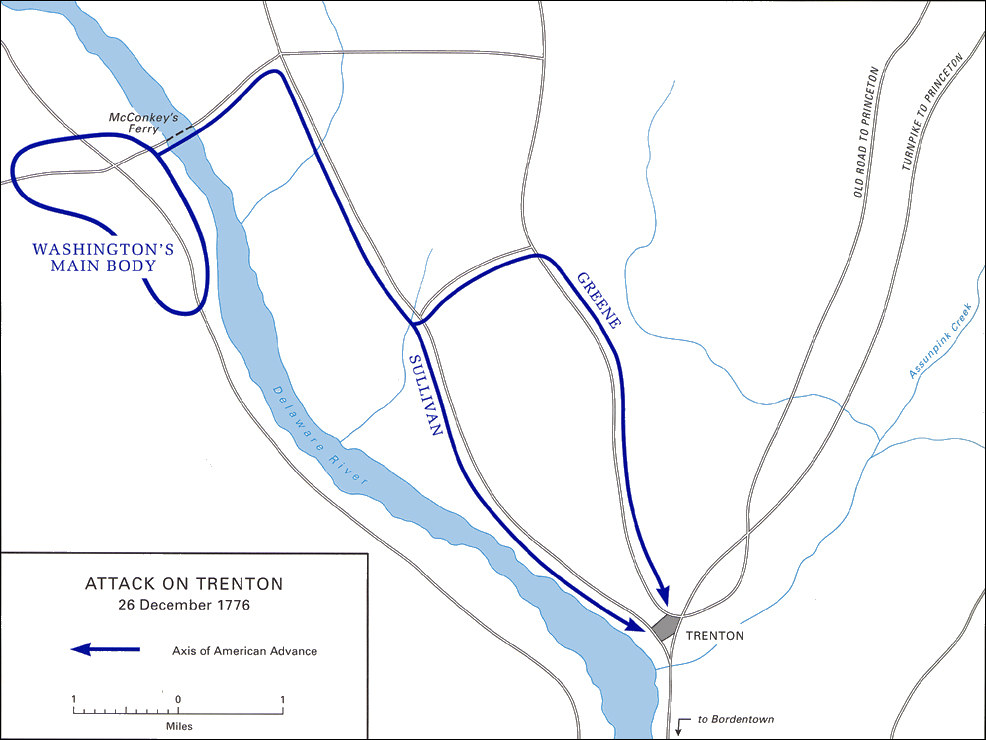
Map showing Washington's movements on the night of December 25–26, 1776, prior to his successful surprise attack in the Battle of Trenton

On the morning of December 25, Washington ordered his Continental Army troops to prepare three days' food and issued orders that every soldier be outfitted with fresh flints for their muskets. Washington was somewhat worried by intelligence reports that the British were planning their own crossing once the Delaware was frozen over. At 4 pm on December 25, Washington's army arrived to begin the crossing of the river. The troops were issued ammunition, and even the officers and musicians were ordered to carry muskets. They were told that they were departing on a secret mission. Marching eight abreast in close formations and ordered to be as quiet as possible, they left the camp for McConkey's Ferry. Washington's plan required the crossing to begin as soon as it was dark enough to conceal their movements on the river, but most of the troops did not reach the crossing point until about 6 pm, about ninety minutes after sunset. As the evening progressed, the weather became progressively worse, turning from drizzle to rain and then to sleet and snow. "It blew a hurricane," one soldier recalled.

Washington had given charge of the crossing to his chief of artillery, Henry Knox. In addition to the crossing of large numbers of troops (most of whom could not swim), he had to safely transport horses and eighteen pieces of artillery over the river. Knox wrote that the crossing was accomplished "with almost infinite difficulty", and that its most significant danger was floating ice in the river. One observer noted that the whole operation might well have failed "but for the stentorian lungs of Colonel Knox". The unusually cold weather of the 1770s and the icy river were likely related to the Little Ice Age.

Washington was among the first of the troops to cross, going with Virginia troops led by General Adam Stephen. These troops formed a sentry line around the landing area in New Jersey, with strict instructions that no one was to pass through. The password was "Victory or Death". The rest of the army crossed without significant incident, although a few men, including Delaware's Colonel John Haslet, fell into the water.

Others who crossed included Arthur St. Clair, who later served as President of the Continental Congress and Governor of the Northwest Territory and John Gano, a brigade chaplain and friend of George Washington, who later served as the first chaplain in the Kentucky state legislature.

The amount of ice on the river prevented the artillery from finishing the crossing until 3 am on December 26. The troops were ready to march around 4 am.

The two other crossings fared less well. The treacherous weather and ice jams on the river stopped General Ewing from even attempting a crossing below Trenton. Colonel Cadwalader crossed a significant portion of his men to New Jersey, but when he found that he could not get his artillery across the river he recalled his men from New Jersey. When he received word about Washington's victory, he crossed his men over again but retreated when he found out that Washington had not stayed in New Jersey.

== Attack ==
On the morning of December 26, as soon as the Continental Army was ready, Washington ordered it split into two columns, one Washington personally commanded with General Greene, and a second led by General Sullivan. The Sullivan column would take River Road from Bear Tavern to Trenton while Washington's column would follow Pennington Road, a parallel route that lay a few miles inland from the Delaware River.

Meanwhile, the Hessians were held up at Trenton. In the days approaching Christmas, they experienced numerous skirmishes around Trenton, and were subjected to frequent gunfire at night, along with repeated false alarms. By Christmas Eve, the Hessians were tired and weary. As a storm and heavy snowfall began Christmas night, Colonel Rall assumed there would be no attack of any consequence to worry about. While Rall was in Trenton, he and some of his top officers spent Christmas evening at the home of Abraham Hunt, Trenton's postmaster, where Hunt played the role of a Loyalist and placated Rall and his officers with food and plenty of drink into the late hours of the evening and morning, which, by many accounts, compromised Rall's ability to respond to Washington's surprise attack at daybreak.

Washington attacked an unsuspecting Rall and his troops and in little time had scattered and divided them and ultimately won the battle. Only three Americans were killed and six wounded, while 22 Hessians were killed, with 98 wounded. During the battle Colonel Rall was mortally wounded, and died the next day. The Americans captured nearly 1,000 prisoners, and seized muskets, gunpowder, artillery pieces, and drums.

== Return to Pennsylvania ==
Following the battle, Washington had to execute a second crossing that was in some ways more difficult than the first. In the aftermath of the battle, the Hessian supplies had been plundered, and, in spite of Washington's explicit orders for its destruction, casks of captured rum were opened, so some of the celebrating troops got drunk, probably contributing to the larger number of troops that had to be pulled from the icy Delaware River waters on the return crossing. They also had to transport the large numbers of prisoners across the river while keeping them under guard. One American acting as a guard on one of the crossings observed that the Hessians, who were standing in knee-deep ice water, were "so cold that their underjaws quivered like an aspen leaf."

The victory had a marked effect on the troops' morale. Soldiers celebrated the victory, Washington's role as a leader was secured, and Congress gained renewed enthusiasm for the war.

== Third crossing ==
Statue of John Glover in Boston

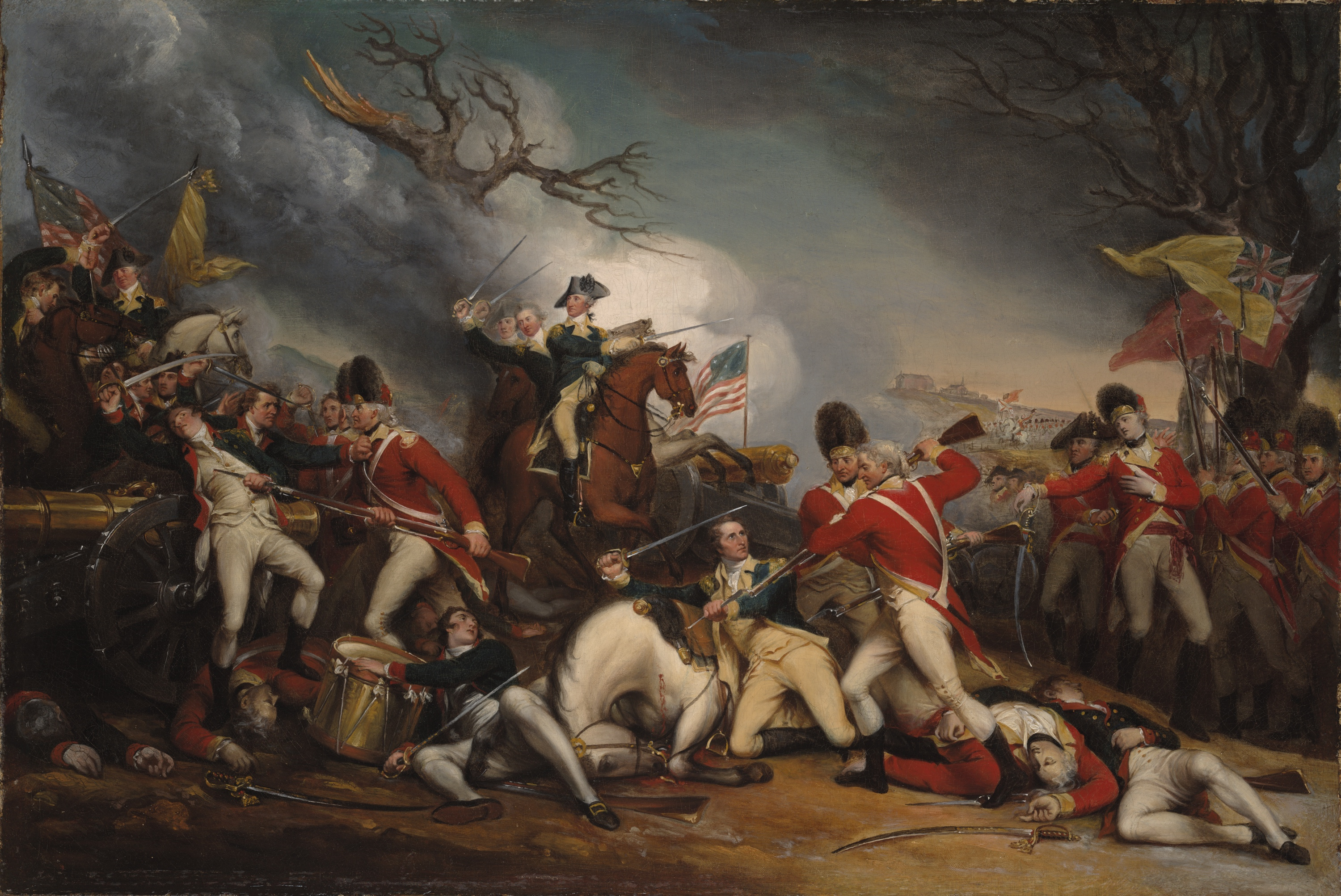
The Death of General Mercer at the Battle of Princeton by John Trumbull

In a war council on December 27, Washington learned that all of the British and Hessian forces had withdrawn as far north as Princeton, something Cadwalader had learned when his militia company crossed the river that morning. In his letter, Cadwalader proposed that the British could be driven entirely from the area, magnifying the victory. After much debate, the council decided on action and planned a third crossing for December 29. On December 28 it snowed, but the weather cleared that night, although it remained bitter cold.

As this effort involved most of the army, eight crossing points were used. At some of crossing points, the ice had frozen two to three inches (4 to 7 cm) thick and was capable of supporting soldiers, who crossed the ice on foot. At other crossings, the conditions were so bad that the attempts were abandoned for the day. It was New Year's Eve before the army and all of its baggage was back in New Jersey. This was somewhat fortunate, as the enlistment period of John Glover's regiment, along with a significant number of others, was expiring at the end of the year, and many of these men, including most of Glover's, wanted to go home, where a lucrative privateering trade awaited them. Only by offering a bounty to be paid immediately from Congressional coffers in Philadelphia did a significant number of men agree to stay with the army another six weeks.

Washington then adopted a fortified position just south of the Assunpink Creek, across the creek from Trenton. In this position, he beat back one assault on January 2, 1777, which he followed up with a decisive victory at Princeton the next day, although General Hugh Mercer was killed in the battle. In the following days, the British withdrew to New Brunswick, and the Continental Army entered winter quarters in Morristown, New Jersey.

== Legacy ==
Both sides of the Delaware River where the crossing took place have been preserved, in an area designated as the Washington's Crossing National Historic Landmark. In this district, Washington Crossing Historic Park in Washington Crossing, Pennsylvania, preserves the area in Pennsylvania, and Washington Crossing State Park in Washington Crossing, New Jersey preserves the area in New Jersey. The two areas are connected by the Washington Crossing Bridge.

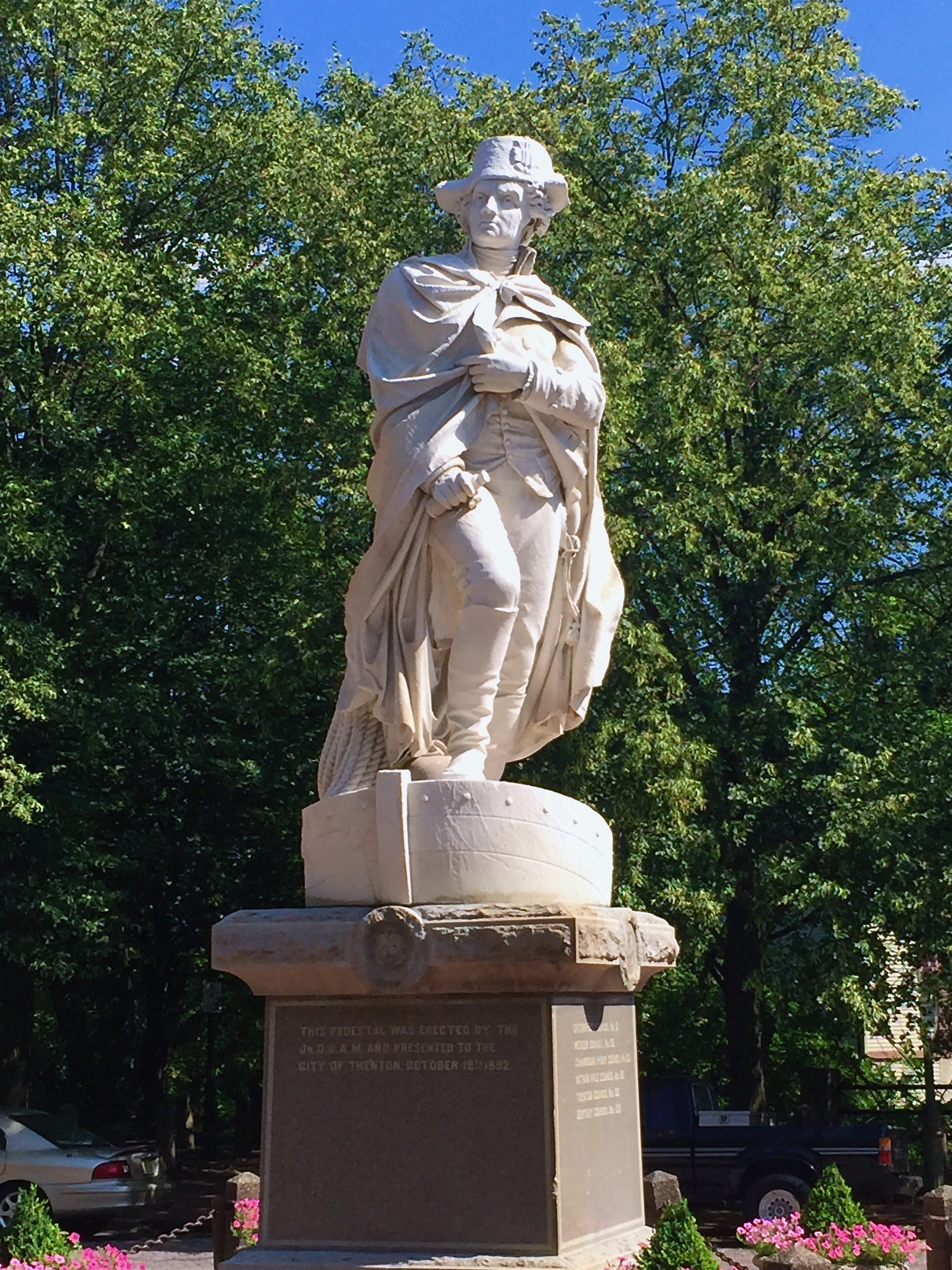
George Washington (c. 1876), Mill Hill, Trenton

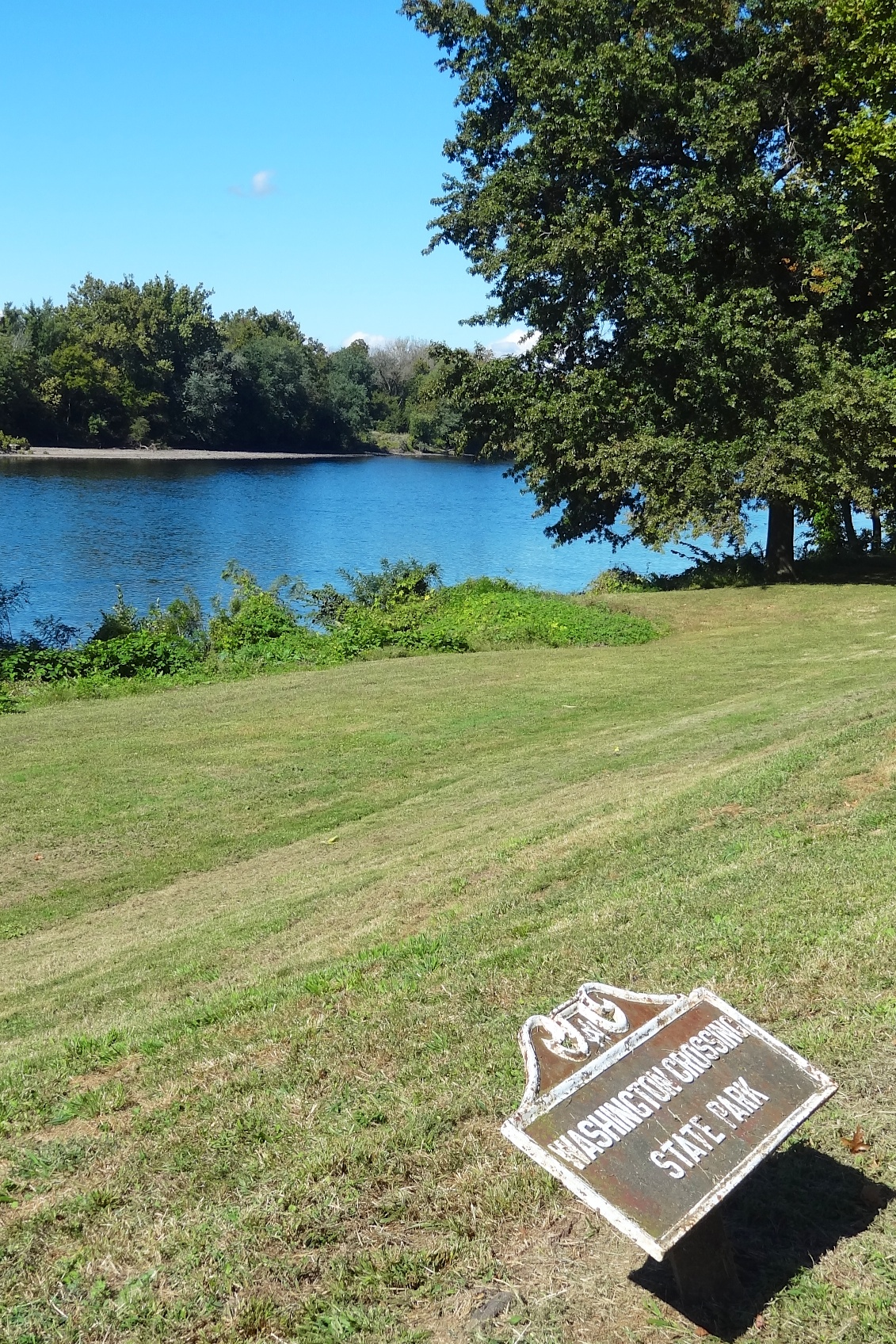
The landing area of Washington and his troops at Washington Crossing State Park

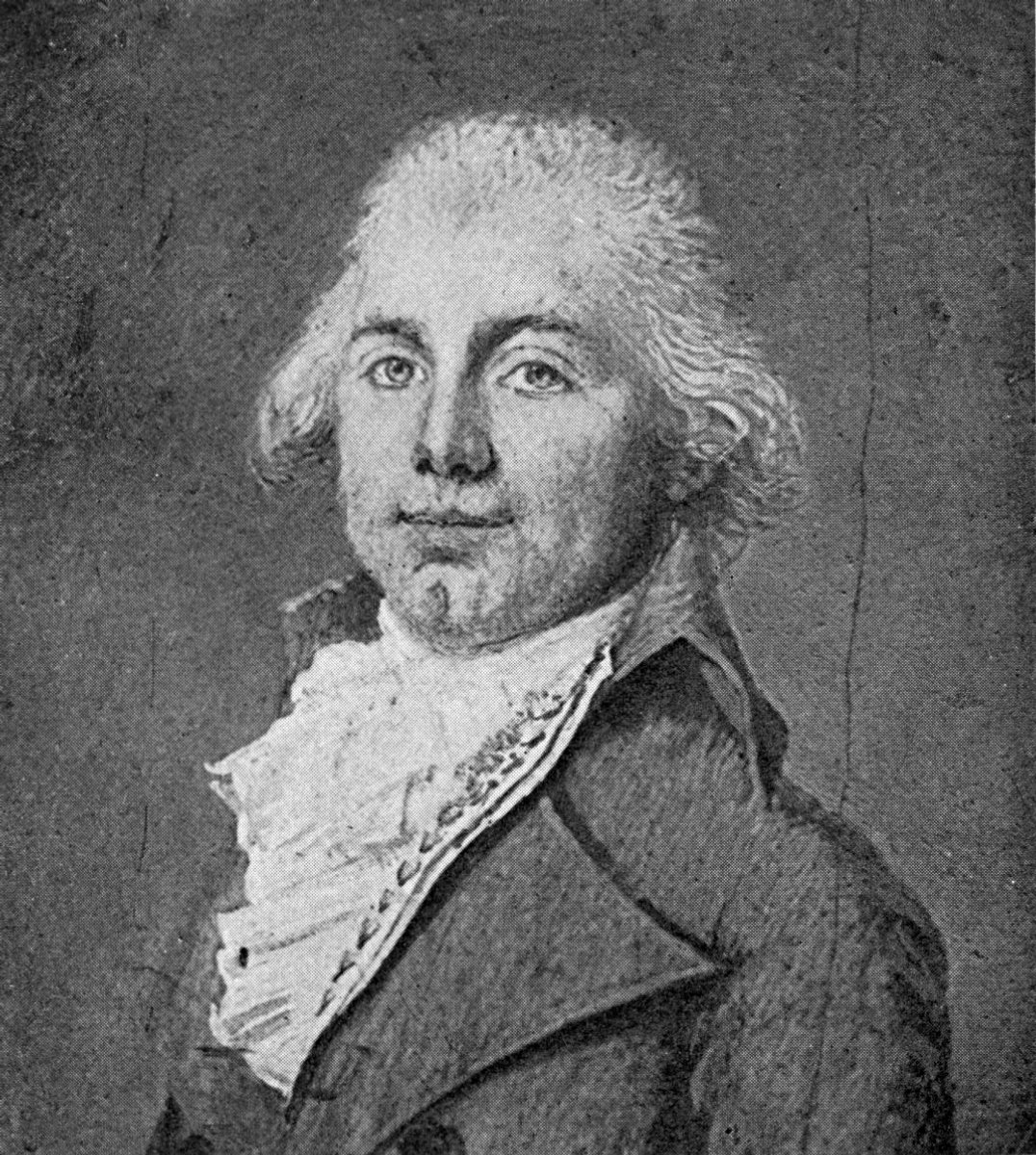
James Monroe, along with George Washington one of the two future U.S. presidents who took part in the crossing

In 1851, the artist Emmanuel Leutze painted Washington Crossing the Delaware, an idealized and inspirational portrait of the crossing.

Fictional portrayals in film of the crossing have also been made, with perhaps the most notable recent one being The Crossing, a 2000 television movie starring Jeff Daniels as George Washington.

A marble statue of George Washington, displayed at the Centennial Exposition in 1876, is located near the Douglass House in the Mill Hill neighborhood of Trenton. He is shown standing on a boat, symbolically representing the crossing. An image of Washington Crossing the Delaware has also appeared on the 1999 New Jersey State Quarter and on the reverse of the 2021 Quarter.

In 1970, the Vietnam Veterans Against the War invoked the crossing when they marched from Morristown to Valley Forge, performing guerrilla theatre, holding press conferences, and passing out flyers in a three-day event called Operation RAW.

== See also ==
- Doan Outlaws, who may have attempted to warn the British of Washington's crossing
- Prince Whipple, according to legend, he accompanied William Whipple and Washington on the crossing, and some believe he is the black man portrayed fending off ice with an oar at Washington's knee in the painting Washington Crossing the Delaware
- "Washington Crossing the Delaware" (sonnet), written in 1936 by David Shulman

== Bibliography ==
- Atkinson, Rick (2020). The British are Coming: The War for America, Lexington to Princeton, 1775-1777. Henry Holt and Company. ISBN 978-125-02-3132-1.
- Brooks, Victor (1999). How America Fought Its Wars. New York: Da Capo Press. ISBN 1-58097-002-8.
- Crocker, H. W. III (2006). Don't Tread on Me. New York: Crown Forum. ISBN 978-1-4000-5363-6.
- Dwyer, William M (1983). The Day is Ours!. New York: Viking. ISBN 0-670-11446-4.
- Fischer, David Hackett (2006). Washington's Crossing. New York: Oxford University Press. ISBN 0-19-518159-X.
- Ketchum, Richard (1999). The Winter Soldiers: The Battles for Trenton and Princeton. Owl Books. ISBN 0-8050-6098-7.
- McCullough, David (2005). 1776. Simon & Schuster. ISBN 0-7432-2671-2.
- Robbins, Michael W. "The Durham Boat" MHQ: Quarterly Journal of Military History (2015) 27#2 pp 26–28, the boat Washington used.
- Savas, Theodore (2006). Guide to the Battles of the American Revolution. Savas Beatie. ISBN 1-932714-12-X.
- Schuyler, Hamilton (1929). A history of Trenton, 1679-1929. Princeton : Princeton University Press: The Trenton Historical Society.
- Stryker, William Scudder (1898). The Battles of Trenton and Princeton. Boston : Houghton, Mifflin and Company.
- "Across the Delaware". Liberty's Kids. Episode 119. PBS.
- "Washington Crossing Historic Park". Pennsylvania Historical and Museum Commission. Archived from the original on 2010-03-30.
- "Washington Crossing State Park". New Jersey Department of Environmental Protection.
