= Douglass House (Trenton, New Jersey) =

Historic house in New Jersey, United States

- U.S. National Register of Historic Places
- U.S. Historic district – Contributing property
- New Jersey Register of Historic Places
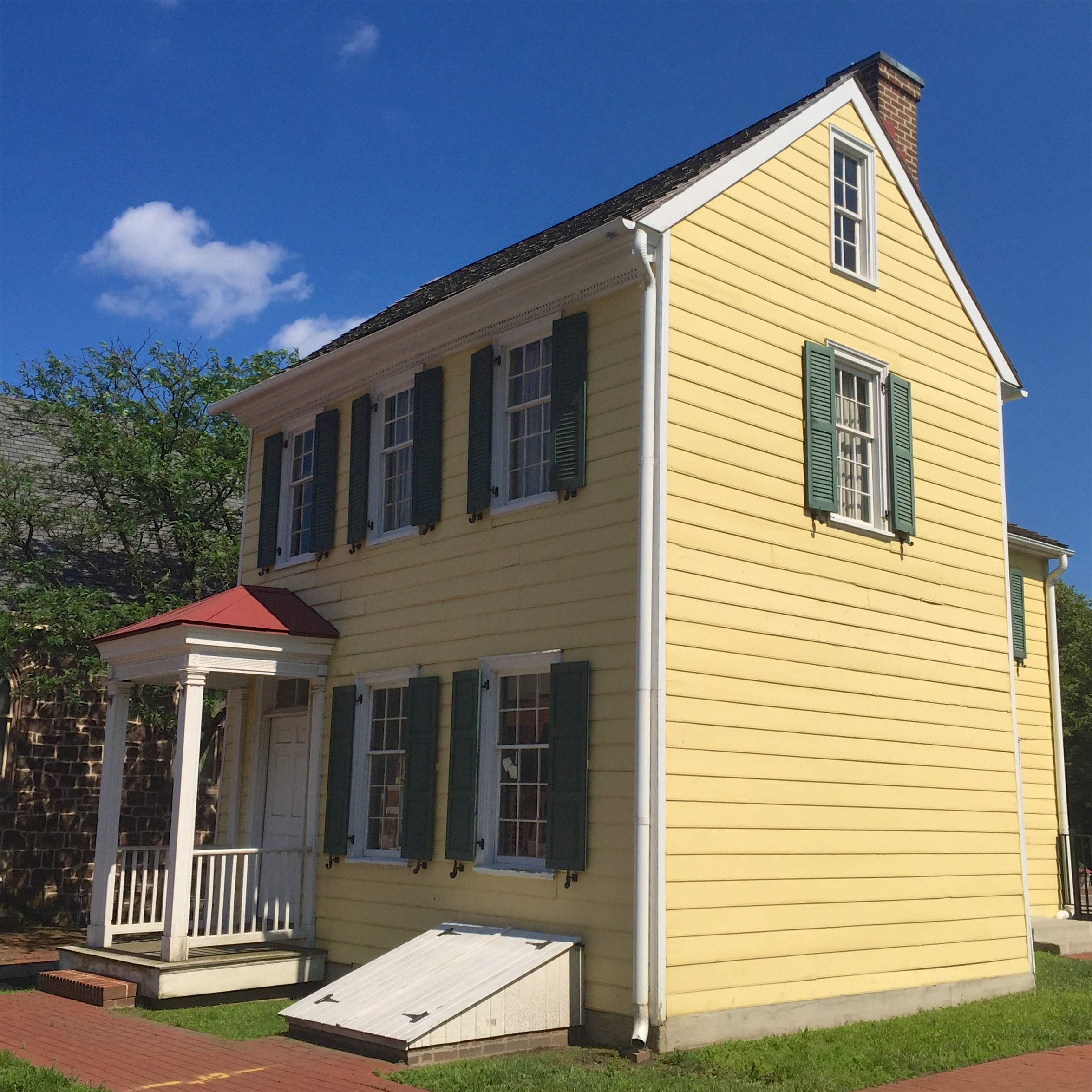
- Douglass House in 2015

- Location within Mercer County, New Jersey Location within New Jersey Location within the United States
- Location: Corner of Front and Montgomery Streets, Trenton, New Jersey
- Coordinates: 40°13′08.1″N 74°45′42.2″W
- Built: c. 1766
- Architectural style: Federal, Side-hall Plan
- Part of: Mill Hill Historic District (ID77000880)
- NRHP reference No.: 70000387
- NJRHP No.: 1766

Significant dates
- Added to NRHP: December 18, 1970
- Designated CP: December 12, 1977
- Designated NJRHP: September 11, 1970

The Douglass House is a historic house at the corner of Front and Montgomery Streets in the Mill Hill neighborhood of the city Trenton in Mercer County, New Jersey. It served as George Washington's headquarters prior to the Battle of Princeton on January 3, 1777. Listed as the Bright–Douglass House, it was documented by the Historic American Buildings Survey in 1936, when the house was located in Mahlon Stacy Park near the Delaware River. It was added to the National Register of Historic Places on December 18, 1970, for its significance in architecture, military and social history. It was added as a contributing property to the Mill Hill Historic District on December 12, 1977.

== History and description ==
Originally located on South Broad Street, the oldest section of the house dates to c. 1766. It was built by Jacob Bright, who sold it to Alexander Douglass, a quartermaster in the Continental Army, in 1769. As of 2017, the house was undergoing extensive renovation.

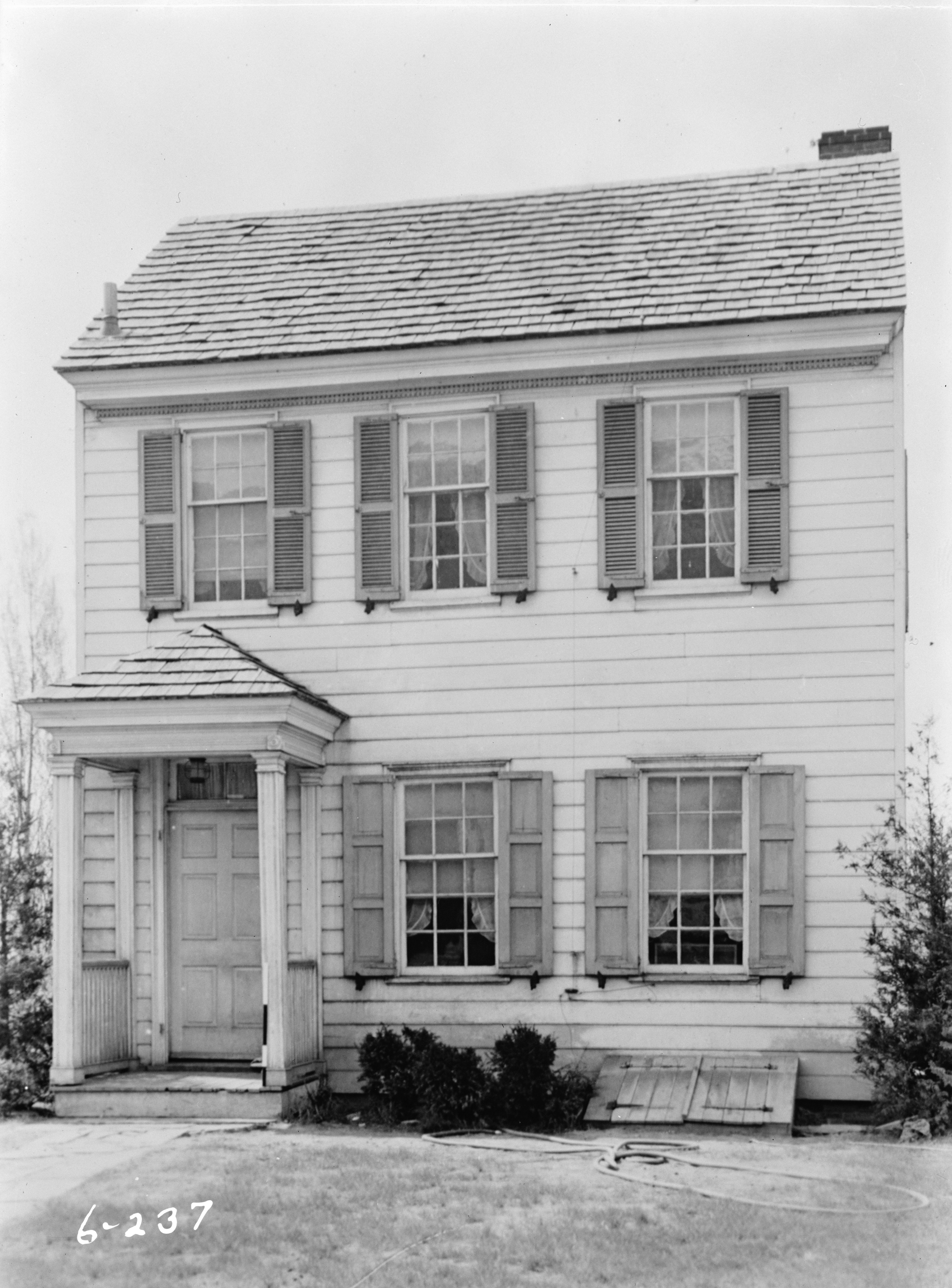
HABS photo from 1936

== See also ==
- List of Washington's Headquarters during the Revolutionary War
- List of the oldest buildings in New Jersey
- National Register of Historic Places listings in Mercer County, New Jersey
