= Mahlon Stacy =

English-born-American settler (1638–1704)

Mahlon Stacy (July 1638 – 5 April 1704) was an English pioneer who led the first group of settlers in the region that became Trenton, New Jersey.

== Life ==
Stacey was born in Handsworth, South Yorkshire, to John Thomas Stacye (1598–1658) and Anne Booth. He was baptised at St Mary's Church on 1 July. The Stacye family resided at Ballifield Hall, and were members of the local Quaker church.

In 1678, likely due to both religious persecution, and to claim tracts of land that had been credited to him against the estate of Edward Byllinge, a fellow Quaker, he left for West Jersey.

He founded the first European settlement at the Falls of the Delaware River, which would grow to become Trenton, New Jersey.

Stacy died on 5 April 1704, aged 65. He was buried at the Riverview Cemetery.

== Mahlon Stacy Park ==
In 1916, Mahlon Stacy Park was opened, located in South Trenton.
