= Washington Crossing =

Washington Crossing or Washington's Crossing may refer to:

== Historical event ==
- George Washington's crossing of the Delaware River, event during the American Revolutionary War before the Battle of Trenton on December 26, 1776

== Places ==
- Washington's Crossing, National Historic Landmark for the event in both New Jersey and Pennsylvania
- Washington Crossing State Park, New Jersey
- Washington Crossing Historic Park, Pennsylvania
- Washington Crossing, New Jersey
- Washington Crossing, Pennsylvania
- Washington Crossing Bridge, between Washington Crossing, New Jersey and Washington Crossing, Pennsylvania
- Washington Crossing Bridge (Pittsburgh), Pennsylvania
- Washington Crossing National Cemetery, Pennsylvania

== Art and literature ==
- Washington's Crossing (book), by David Hackett Fischer
- Washington Crossing the Delaware (1851 painting), by Emanuel Leutze
- Washington Crossing the Delaware (1953 painting), by Larry Rivers
- "Washington Crossing the Delaware" (sonnet), a 1936 sonnet by David Schulman
- The Crossing (2000 film), an A&E television movie

== See also ==
- Washington Crossing the Delaware (disambiguation)
