= Washington Crossing the Delaware =

Washington Crossing the Delaware may refer to:

- George Washington's crossing of the Delaware River, an event during the American Revolutionary War before the Battle of Trenton on December 26, 1776
- Washington Crossing the Delaware (1851 paintings), three paintings by Emanuel Leutze
- Washington Crossing the Delaware (1953 painting), by Larry Rivers
- Washington Crossing the Delaware (1876 statue), in Trenton, New Jersey
- "Washington Crossing the Delaware" (sonnet), a 1936 sonnet by David Shulman

== See also ==
- The Passage of the Delaware, 1819 painting by Thomas Sully
- List of paintings of George Washington
