= Anagrammatic poetry =

Form of poetry

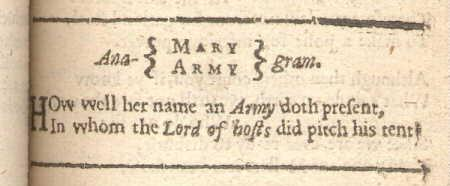
The poem "Anagram" from the 1633 edition of George Herbert's The Temple, connecting the words Mary and army

Anagrammatic poetry is poetry with the constrained form that either each line or each verse is an anagram of all other lines or verses in the poem.

A poet that specializes in anagrams is an anagrammarian.

Writing anagrammatic poetry is a form of a constrained writing similar to writing pangrams or long alliterations.

== List of anagrammatic poems ==
- Archive of Literary Anagrams: Hundreds of long anagrams of poetic and literary subjects by over 50 contributors, including the longest literary anagram ever created.
- "Eight Poems in the Manner of OuLiPo", by Kevin McFadden.
- "Oh Damn! Must I Refrigerate?": Anagrammatic poem by Cory Calhoun of the title and first eight lines of Shakespeare's sonnet "The Marriage of True Minds."
- "Dianagrams and Monica Lewinsky" by Pip Eastop
- "Rishi Talks to Katie": a dialogue between two high school students: a text's sentences are rearranged, then its words, then its letters
- In the French poem Ulcérations by Georges Perec, every line is an anagram of the title.
- The book Permutation City opens with an anagramatic poem.
- In the poem "Washington Crossing the Delaware" by David Shulman (1936), all 14 lines are anagrams of the title.
- In the online book, ISOTOPES2 by Daniel Zimmerman, each line of the 14 line poems anagrams a 4 x 4 word square.
- "The Uncertainty of the Poet", by Wendy Cope, is a gentle poem that repeatedly shuffles its words.

== See also ==
- Vocabularyclept poem
- Magnetic poetry
