= Bowman's Hill Wildflower Preserve =

Garden and museum in New Hope, Pennsylvania, US

Coordinates: 40.3301°N 74.9406°W

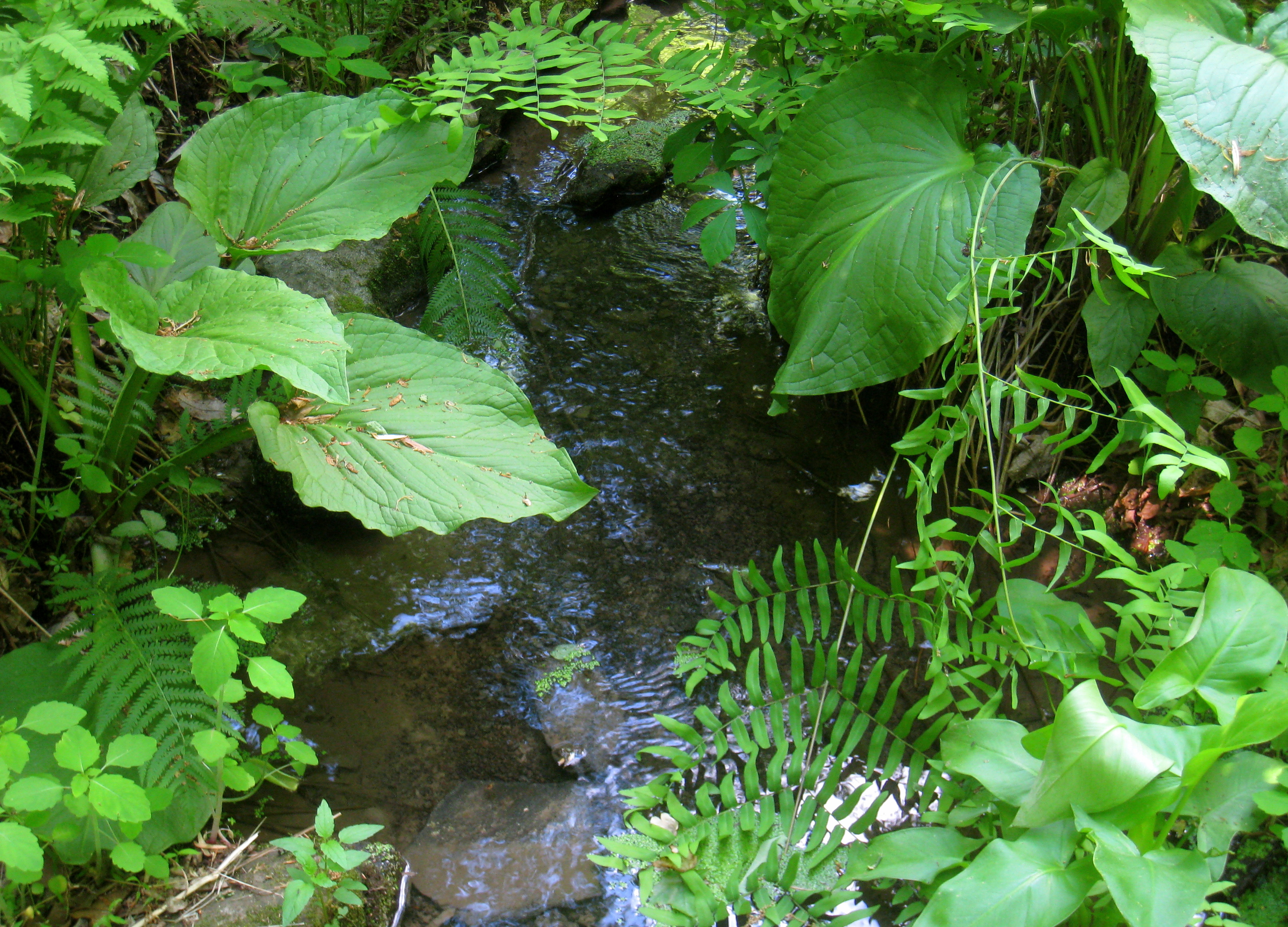
- Established: 1934
- Location: 1635 River Road, New Hope, PA, USA
- Director: Peter Couchman
- Website: bhwp.org

Bowman's Hill Wildflower Preserve is a 134 acres (54 ha) nature preserve, botanical garden, and accredited museum located at 1635 River Road (Pennsylvania Route 32), New Hope, Pennsylvania. The preserve is open daily, except for major holidays, April–June, and closed on Tuesdays July–March; an admission fee is charged to nonmembers. A non-profit organization, Bowman's Hill Wildflower Preserve Association Inc., maintains the park in accordance to a management agreement with the Pennsylvania Department of Conservation and Natural Resources and the Pennsylvania Historical and Museum Commission.

Today, the preserve contains over 700 of the 2,000 plant species native to Pennsylvania and the Delaware Valley, growing in a naturalistic setting of woodlands, meadows, ponds and Pidcock Creek, with about 4.5 miles of walking trails. It is an excellent site for bird-watching.

== Mission ==
The mission of Bowman's Hill Wildflower Preserve is to lead people to a greater appreciation of native plants, to an understanding of their importance to all life, and to a commitment to the preservation of a healthy and diverse natural world.

== History ==
The preserve was established in 1934 within the Washington Crossing Historic Park at the site where George Washington's army camped during the American Revolutionary War. Just five miles south of the preserve, Washington and his men crossed the Delaware River to fight and win the Battle of Trenton in 1776.

== Climate ==
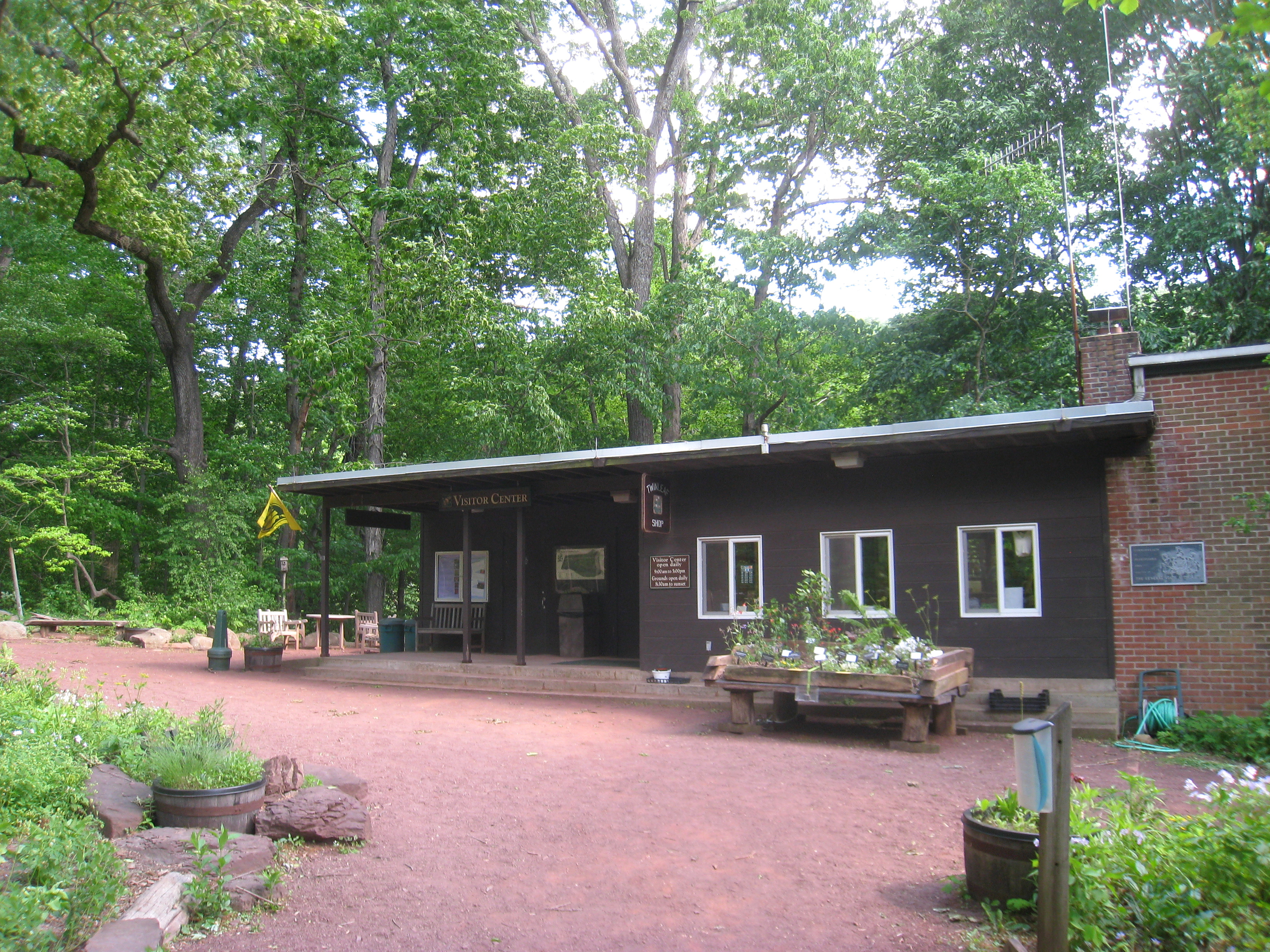
Visitor Center.

According to the Trewartha climate classification system, Bowman's Hill Wildflower Preserve has a Temperate Continental climate (Dc) with hot summers (a), cold winters (o) and year-around precipitation. Dcao climates are characterized by at least one month having an average mean temperature ≤ 32.0 °F (0 °C), four to seven months with an average mean temperature ≥ 50.0 °F (10 °C), at least one month with an average mean temperature ≥ 72.0 °F (22 °C) and no significant precipitation difference between seasons.

Although most summer days are slightly humid at Bowman's Hill Wildflower Preserve, episodes of heat and high humidity can occur with heat index values > 108 °F (42 °C). Since 1981, the highest air temperature was 103.2 °F (40 °C) on 07/22/2011, and the highest daily average mean dew point was 74.9 °F (24 °C) on 08/13/2016. The average wettest month is July which corresponds with the annual peak in thunderstorm activity. Since 1981, the wettest calendar day was 7.07 inches (180 mm) on 08/27/2011. During the winter months, the plant hardiness zone is 6b with an average annual extreme minimum air temperature of −0.9 °F (−18 °C). Since 1981, the coldest air temperature was −12.0 °F (−24 °C) on 01/22/1984. Episodes of extreme cold and wind can occur with wind chill values < −12 °F (−24 °C). The average annual snowfall (Nov-Apr) is between 24 and 30 inches (61 and 76 cm), and the average snowiest month is February which corresponds with the peak in nor'easter activity.

Climate data for Bowman's Hill Wildflower Preserve (Visitor Center), 1981-2010 normals, extremes 1981-2018
Month	Jan	Feb	Mar	Apr	May	Jun	Jul	Aug	Sep	Oct	Nov	Dec	Year
Record high °F (°C)	71.4 (21.9)	77.9 (25.5)	87.6 (30.9)	94.2 (34.6)	94.9 (34.9)	96.7 (35.9)	103.2 (39.6)	100.4 (38.0)	98.1 (36.7)	89.6 (32.0)	80.8 (27.1)	75.3 (24.1)	103.2 (39.6)
Mean daily maximum °F (°C)	39.6 (4.2)	43.0 (6.1)	51.2 (10.7)	63.1 (17.3)	73.0 (22.8)	82.1 (27.8)	86.4 (30.2)	84.6 (29.2)	77.6 (25.3)	66.3 (19.1)	55.3 (12.9)	44.1 (6.7)	64.0 (17.8)
Daily mean °F (°C)	31.2 (−0.4)	33.9 (1.1)	41.4 (5.2)	52.1 (11.2)	61.7 (16.5)	71.1 (21.7)	75.8 (24.3)	74.2 (23.4)	66.9 (19.4)	55.3 (12.9)	45.7 (7.6)	35.9 (2.2)	53.9 (12.2)
Mean daily minimum °F (°C)	22.8 (−5.1)	24.9 (−3.9)	31.6 (−0.2)	41.0 (5.0)	50.3 (10.2)	60.2 (15.7)	65.1 (18.4)	63.7 (17.6)	56.1 (13.4)	44.3 (6.8)	36.1 (2.3)	27.6 (−2.4)	43.7 (6.5)
Record low °F (°C)	−12.0 (−24.4)	−3.5 (−19.7)	2.0 (−16.7)	17.5 (−8.1)	32.9 (0.5)	41.1 (5.1)	47.2 (8.4)	41.9 (5.5)	33.8 (1.0)	24.5 (−4.2)	11.6 (−11.3)	−1.1 (−18.4)	−12.0 (−24.4)
Average precipitation inches (mm)	3.48 (88)	2.75 (70)	4.13 (105)	4.05 (103)	4.25 (108)	4.48 (114)	5.16 (131)	4.06 (103)	4.40 (112)	3.98 (101)	3.73 (95)	4.12 (105)	48.59 (1,234)
Average relative humidity (%)	65.8	62.4	58.2	57.4	61.9	66.1	66.4	68.8	70.0	69.0	67.3	67.3	65.1
Average dew point °F (°C)	21.1 (−6.1)	22.4 (−5.3)	27.8 (−2.3)	37.5 (3.1)	48.5 (9.2)	59.2 (15.1)	63.8 (17.7)	63.3 (17.4)	56.8 (13.8)	45.3 (7.4)	35.5 (1.9)	26.1 (−3.3)	42.4 (5.8)
Source: PRISM

== Ecology ==
According to the A. W. Kuchler U.S. potential natural vegetation types, Bowman's Hill Wildflower Preserve would have a dominant vegetation type of Appalachian Oak (104) with a dominant vegetation form of Eastern hardwood forest (25).

== See also ==
- List of botanical gardens in the United States
- List of museums in Pennsylvania
- Bowman's Hill Tower
