= Vocabularyclept poem =

Type of poem

A vocabularyclept poem is a poem which is formed by taking the words of an existing poem and rearranging them into a new work of literature.

== History ==
Vocabularyclept poetry was first proposed in 1969 by Word Ways editor Howard Bergerson. He took his little-known 1944 poem "Winter Retrospect", put all the words in alphabetical order, and challenged readers to arrange them all into a new poem. An extract from Bergerson's original poem:

Blow, blast. Whirl through the dusk, snow,
Downward swirling, then into the trees go.
Short is the gloaming, long thy soundless driving.
Coat the tinsel icicles under my eaves.
Hurry your failing glow to my window-pane.
Build up the slow ache in me that rain
Cannot. Only the snow the soul of winter is riving,
Only the snow the soul of me. Only the snow weaves
That watery crystal floss filled with dusk
And sends through the walls that bland and watery musk.

The challenge was taken up later that year by J. A. Lindon, who, without having consulted Bergerson's original, produced an entirely different poem also titled "Winter Retrospect". Both poems are 24 lines long and contain 478 words, and have been subject to several literary and statistical analyses. Extract from J. A. Lindon's version:

Night sends me this whirl of snow.
Under the low trees the watery glow
Of your lamp looking through the dusk—my
Thoughts are still that it must die.
Upon these walls the snow is driving.
Grow with the wind's lonely music, my soul, riving
Bland aspirations split with the blast up in the eaves,
And I shall remember only that the mind, though failing, weaves
Tinsel in darkness, memory a kaleidoscope, floss
That soundless flies, musk rose, and all that nearly was.

Many vocabularyclept poems by Lindon and others appeared in later issues of Word Ways. These and others are collected and discussed in various wordplay books by Bergerson and David Morice.

A variation on the idea of rearranging an existing vocabulary into a poem was independently discovered by Dave Kapell. His Magnetic Poetry kits consist of individual words—often related to a particular theme or topic—printed on small magnets which can be creatively arranged on a refrigerator or other metal surface.

== See also ==
- Anagrammatic poetry
- Cento (poetry)
- Cut-up technique
- Magnetic Poetry
