= Minnesota Marine Art Museum =

Art museum in Winona, Minnesota

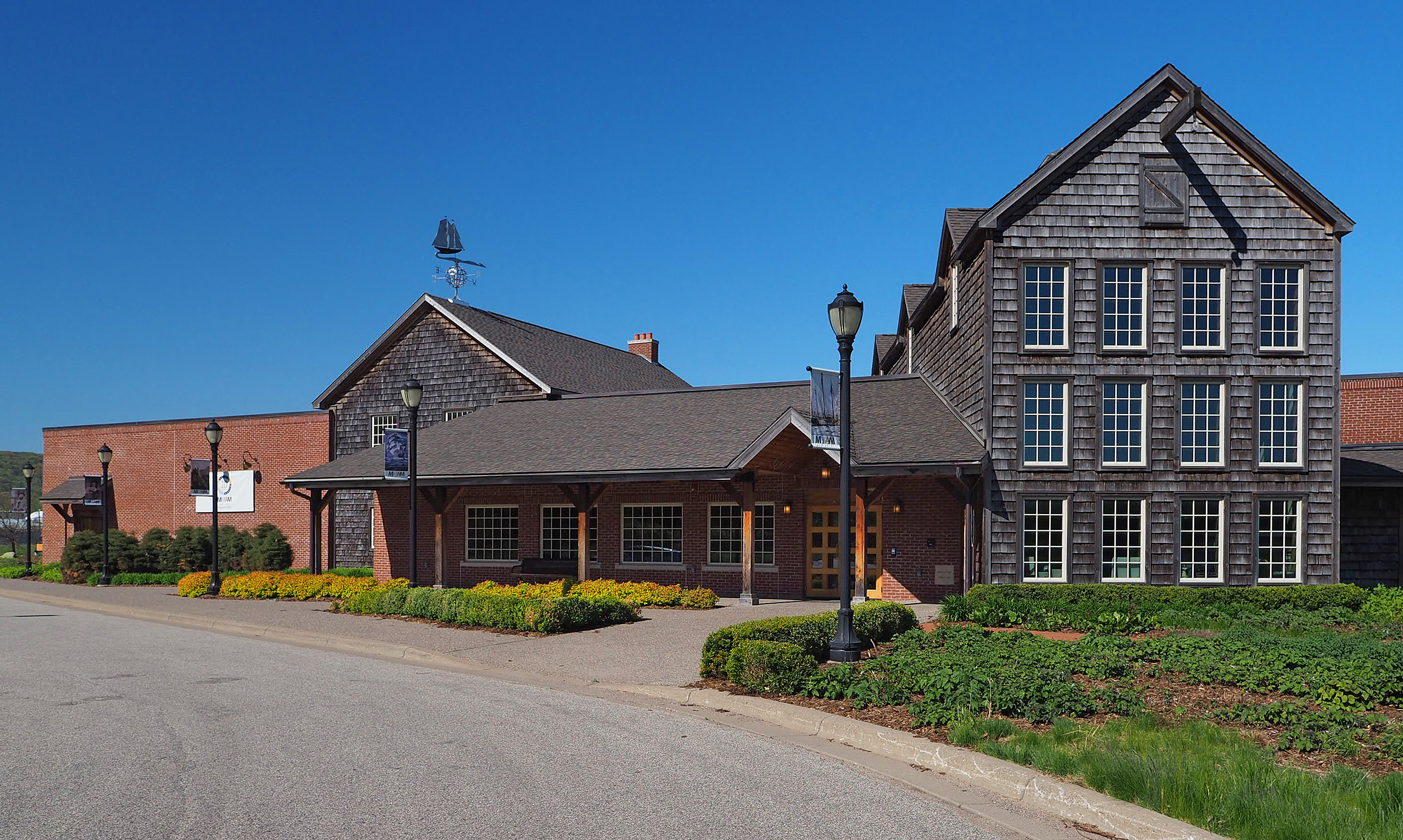
- The Minnesota Marine Art Museum from the east
- Established: July 27, 2006
- Location: 800 Riverview Drive; Winona, Minnesota
- Coordinates: 44°03′32″N 91°39′25″W
- Type: Art museum
- Website: www.mmam.org

The Minnesota Marine Art Museum (MMAM) is an art museum in Winona, Minnesota, United States, specializing in great art inspired by water. MMAM is a nonprofit art museum that engages visitors in meaningful visual art experiences through education and exhibitions that explore the ongoing and historic human relationship with water. The purpose-built museum is located on the banks of the Mississippi River and boasts six galleries, an educational and events space, and a destination retail shop on its seven acre riverside campus.

== History ==
The Minnesota Marine Art Museum opened on July 27, 2006, with an initial collection on loan from Winona couple Mary Burrichter and Bob Kierlin, founder of Fastenal. Expansions to the museum were completed in 2009, 2013, and 2014.

== Collection ==
The Minnesota Marine Art Museum presents exhibitions that span from contemporary to historic, across a variety of mediums. It is through this surprising diversity that MMAM is not only describing what marine art is, but pushing the boundaries of what marine art can be.

In 2023, MMAM will present a year-long suite of integrated exhibitions and programs that explore the human relationship to the flora and fauna of our mysterious and brilliant world. A trajectory of three artists, three mediums, and three masterful surface explorations of the botanical wonders of our world. Historic Japanese prints from Imao Keinen, contemporary porcelain vessels by Hitomi Hosono, and printed fabrics and original prints from Ian Hanesworth.

One of two surviving versions of Washington Crossing the Delaware by Emanuel Leutze was loaned by private collectors in 2014 to MMAM. This version of the painting, the third and final version created by Leutze, is a smaller scale version which most recently was on display at the White House prior to its acquisition by the MMAM. This painting is no longer on display at MMAM as of April 2022.
