= Washington Crossing Historic Park =

- U.S. National Register of Historic Places
- U.S. National Historic Landmark
- Pennsylvania state historical marker
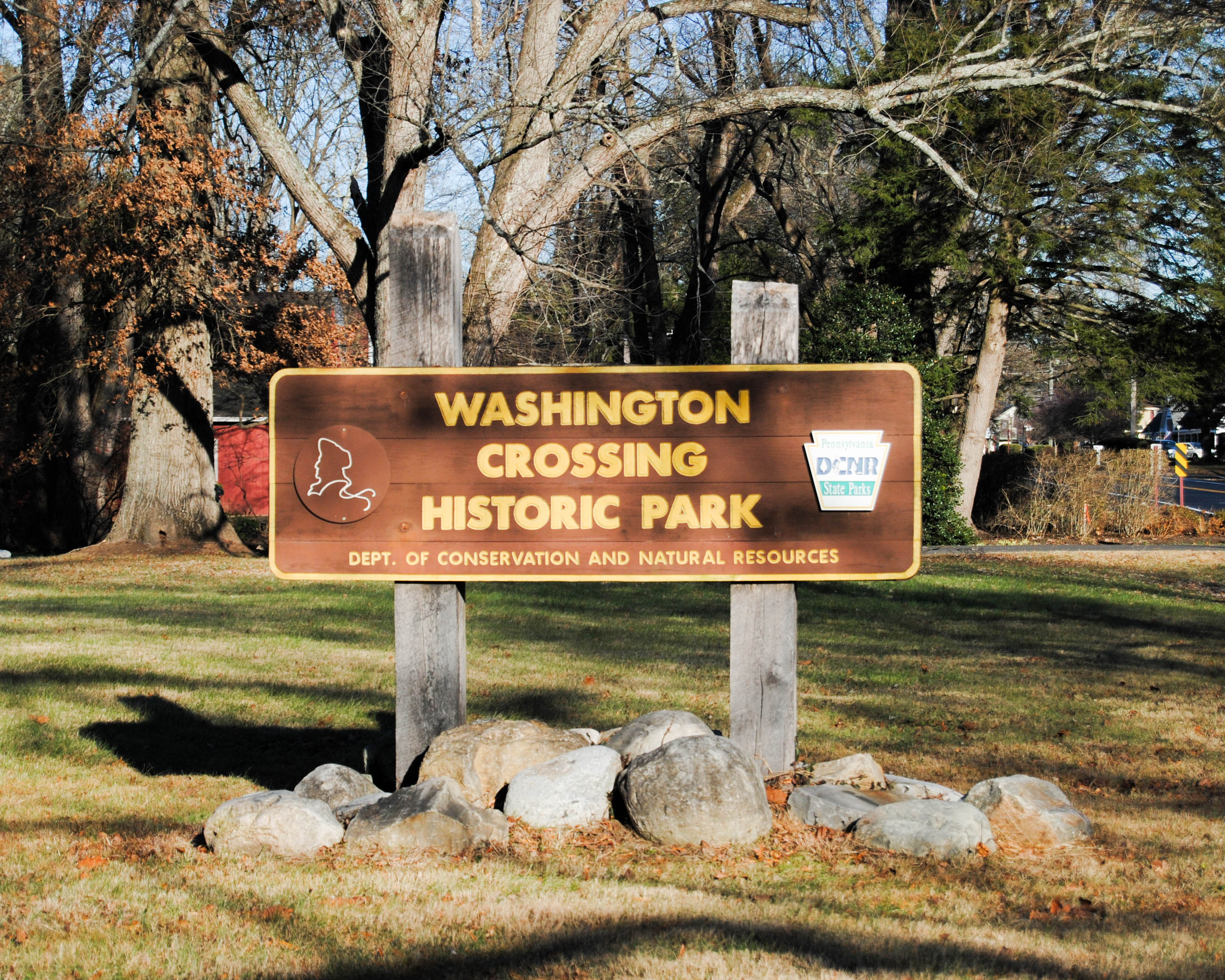
- Roadside sign near the entrance of Washington Crossing Historic Park

- Location within Pennsylvania Location within the United States
- Location: Between Yardley and New Hope, on the Delaware River, Yardley, Pennsylvania
- Coordinates: 40°17′51″N 74°52′35″W
- Area: 500 acres (200 ha)
- Built: 1776
- NRHP reference No.: 66000650

Significant dates
- Added to NRHP: October 15, 1966
- Designated NHL: January 20, 1961
- Designated PHMC: November 17, 1947

Washington Crossing Historic Park is a 500-acre (2 km^{2}) state park in Washington Crossing, Pennsylvania and Solebury Township, Pennsylvania.

The park's two locations represent its two sections. One section of the park, the "lower park," is headquartered in the village of Washington Crossing located in Upper Makefield Township in Bucks County, Pennsylvania. It marks the location of George Washington's crossing of the Delaware River during the American Revolutionary War. The park is operated by the Pennsylvania Department of Conservation and Natural Resources in partnership with the Friends of Washington Crossing Park.

The lower park includes 13 historic buildings including McConkey's Ferry Inn, where General George Washington and his aides ate dinner and made plans prior to the crossing. Among the historic buildings is a 20th-century barn that houses 5 replica Durham boats, which were large, open boats that were used to transport pig iron along the Delaware River at the time of the American Revolutionary War. These boats, along with the ferries and others, were used to transport soldiers, horses, and equipment across the river on the night of December 25–26, 1776. The replica boats are used each year when the nighttime crossing is reenacted in the park.

Located 4.5 miles away in Solebury Township, is the park's northern section, the "upper park." In its 100-acre area it contains (0.4 km^{2}) Bowman's Hill Tower and the Thompson-Neely House, which was used as a military hospital during Washington's encampment in the area, and the graves of an estimated 40 to 60 soldiers who died there. The exact location of the graves is unknown, though they were partially unearthed during the construction of the nearby Delaware Canal in the early 19th century and during other nearby construction projects. Presently there are 23 memorial headstones as a reminder that the area is a gravesite.

The lower park contains a visitor center, which was renovated from July 2011 to March 2013. The newly renovated visitor center was opened March 10, 2013. It features a small exhibition with some Revolutionary war artifacts, and an original letter written by George Washington while in the McConkey's Ferry Inn. The park also has obtained a full size digital copy of Emanuel Leutze's 1851 painting, Washington Crossing the Delaware, from the Metropolitan Museum of Art, that is hanging in the auditorium.

== History and mission of the park ==
The park was created in 1917 and the Washington Crossing Park Commission was established in 1919 to administer and develop the park.

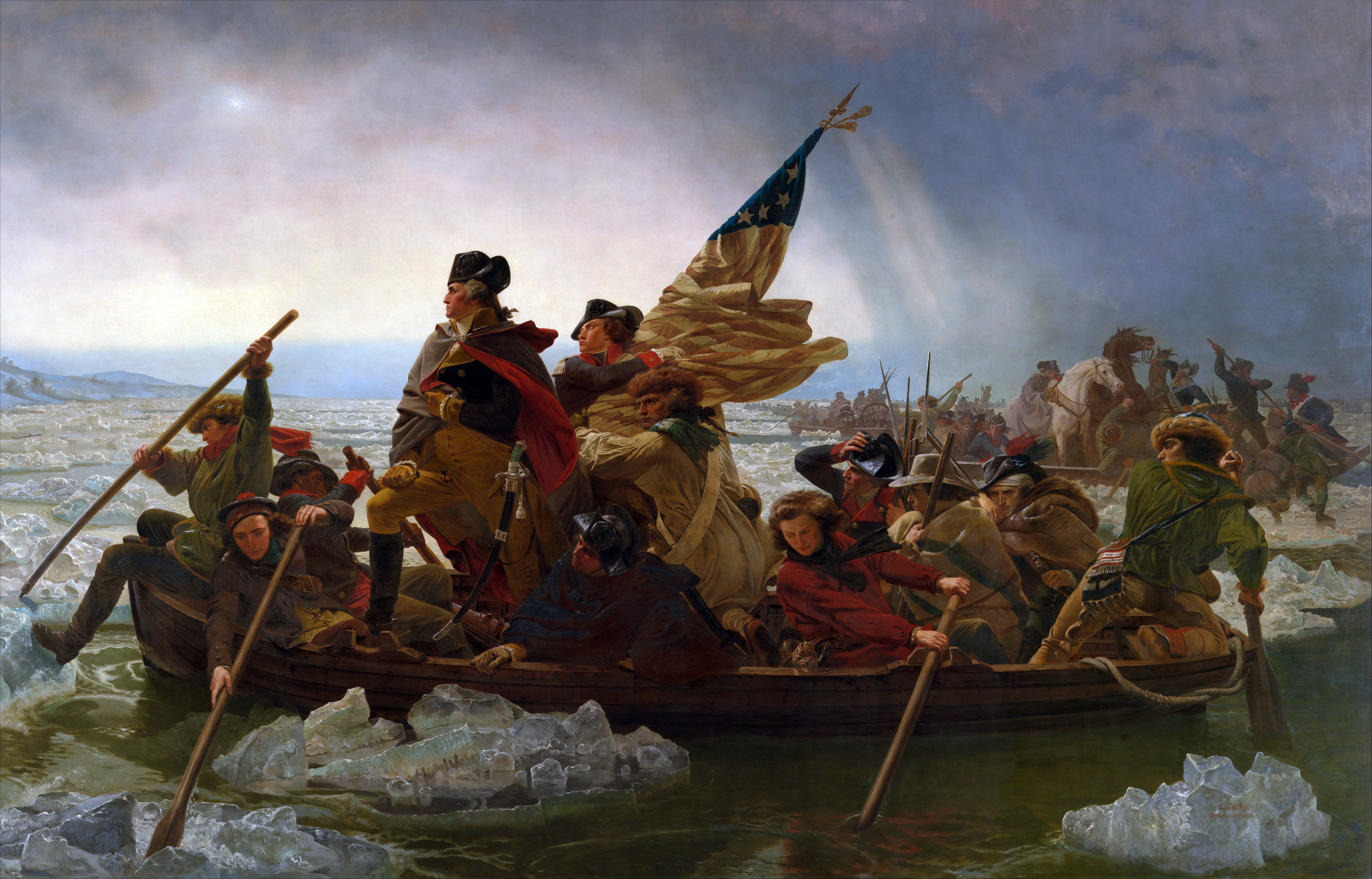
Washington Crossing the Delaware by Emanuel Leutze, 1851

The park was formed to commemorate the famous Crossing as the "Turning point of the American Revolution." The commission's first objective was to develop the site as a historical shrine and its second objective was to preserve its natural beauty and develop its areas for recreational use. Bowman's Hill Tower was built to commemorate what may have been a lookout point for General George Washington's troops to watch the banks of the Delaware River for enemy activity. The park also contains the Bowman's Hill Wildflower Preserve and the surrounding area is the natural habitat for many native plants, trees, animals and birds. Today the park serves to preserve and interpret the site of the Washington's Crossing of the Delaware.

The park is administered by the Department of Conservation and Natural Resources (DCNR). Cuts in funding from the Commonwealth of Pennsylvania forced the PHMC to reduce park staffing, which resulted in closing the park to the public in late November, 2009. In 2013, the Pennsylvania state budget and fiscal code mandated that the park transfer from PHMC to DCNR. The switch was finalized in early 2016. The Friends of Washington Crossing Park, a 501(c)(3) private, non-profit corporation, was incorporated in January 2010 to support the PHMC in operating Washington Crossing Historic Park, and the park re-opened to the public in the spring of that same year. The Friends of Washington Crossing Park re-opened the park's gift shop in December 2010. Current full-time, on-site staffing consists of 2 museum professionals and 2 maintenance personnel provided by the PHMC, who work in conjunction with the part-time staff of historical interpreters provided by the Friends of Washington Crossing Park. Washington Crossing Historic Park is open for guided tours Monday through Sundays from 10am – 4pm, April 1 – December 31. The recreational areas of the park, including the picnic pavilions, are open to the public from dawn to dusk all year. The park holds a reenactment of General Washington's nighttime crossing every year, plus other public programs on related themes throughout the year.

The park was included in the Washington's Crossing National Historic Landmark designation in 1961, and was added to the National Register of Historic Places in 1966.

== McConkey's Ferry ==
On the night of December 25–26, 1776, General George Washington and a small army of 2,400 men crossed the Delaware River at McConkey's Ferry, on their way to attack a Hessian garrison of 1,500 in Trenton, New Jersey. The crossing, made during a time when morale was at its lowest point during the American Revolution, renewed hope among the Continental Army, Congress and the general population. On the morning of December 26, at the Battle of Trenton, they were able to force the Hessian soldiers to surrender, without any American casualties.

The ferry was first established by Henry Baker in 1684. His grandson, Samuel Baker Jr., sold it to Samuel McConkey (also spelled McKonkey) on December 5, 1774. McConkey sold it to Benjamin Taylor on March 21, 1777. The corresponding ferry on the New Jersey side of the Delaware River was known as Johnson's Ferry.

== Gallery ==
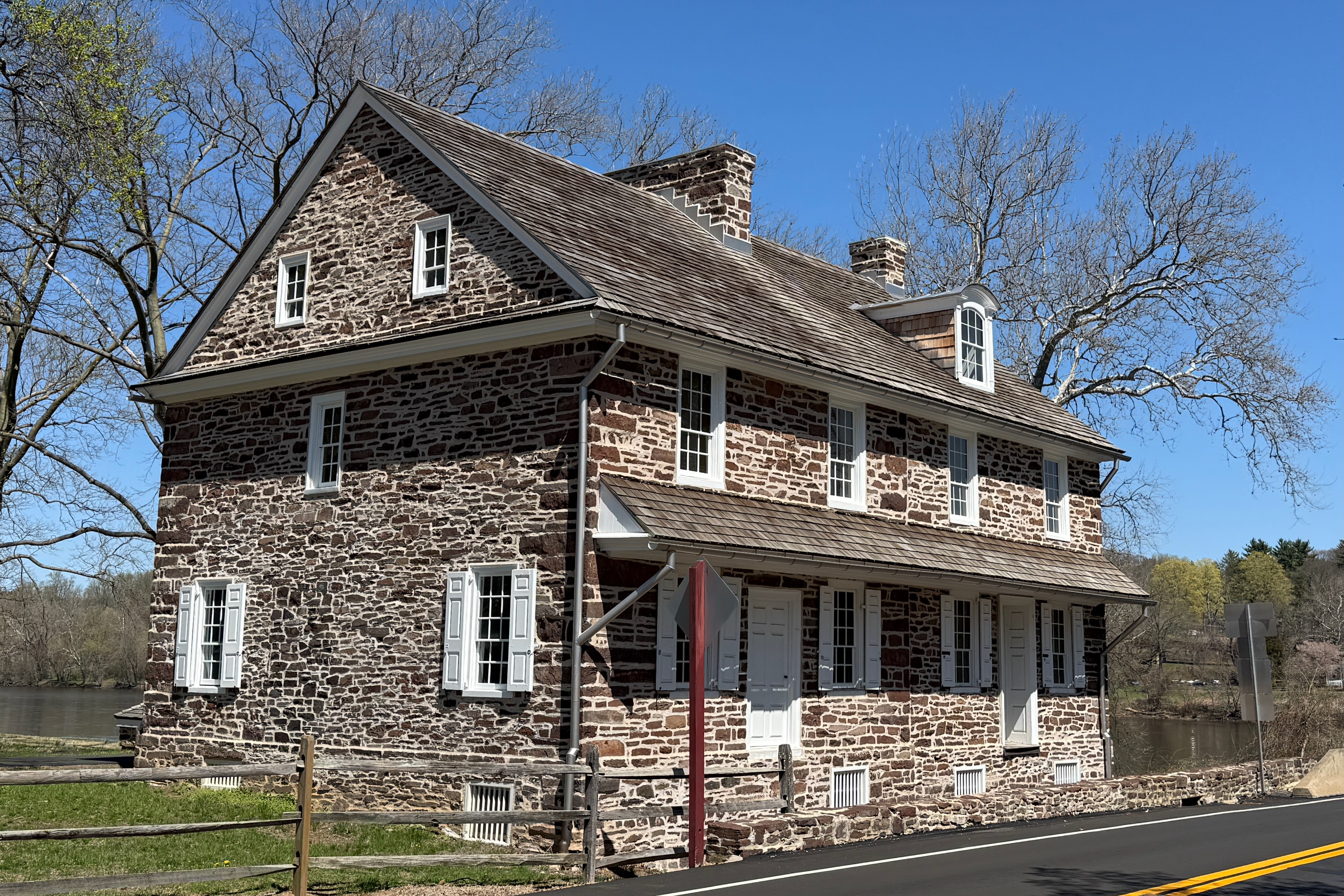
McConkey's Ferry Inn

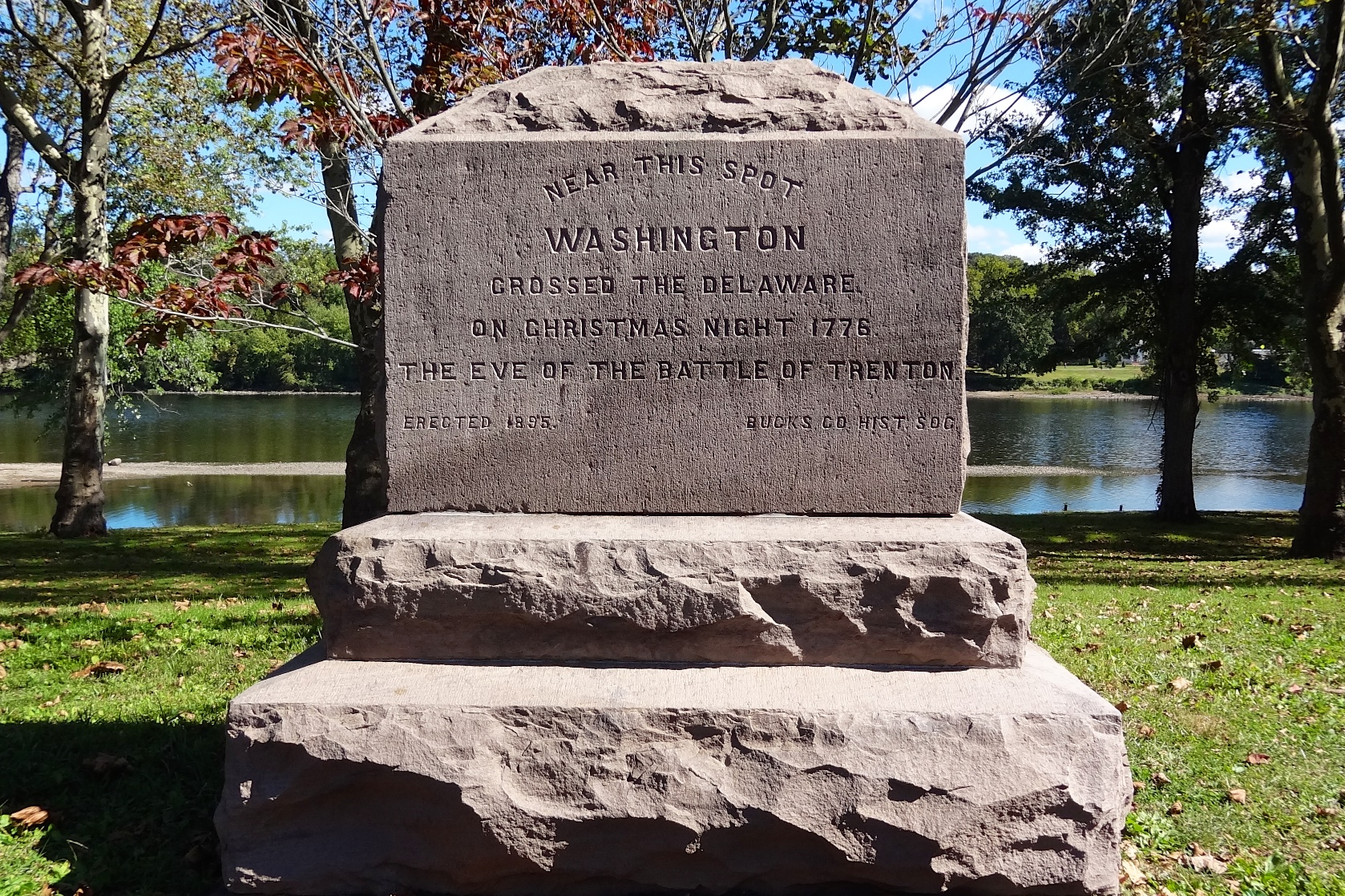
Monument near the crossing site

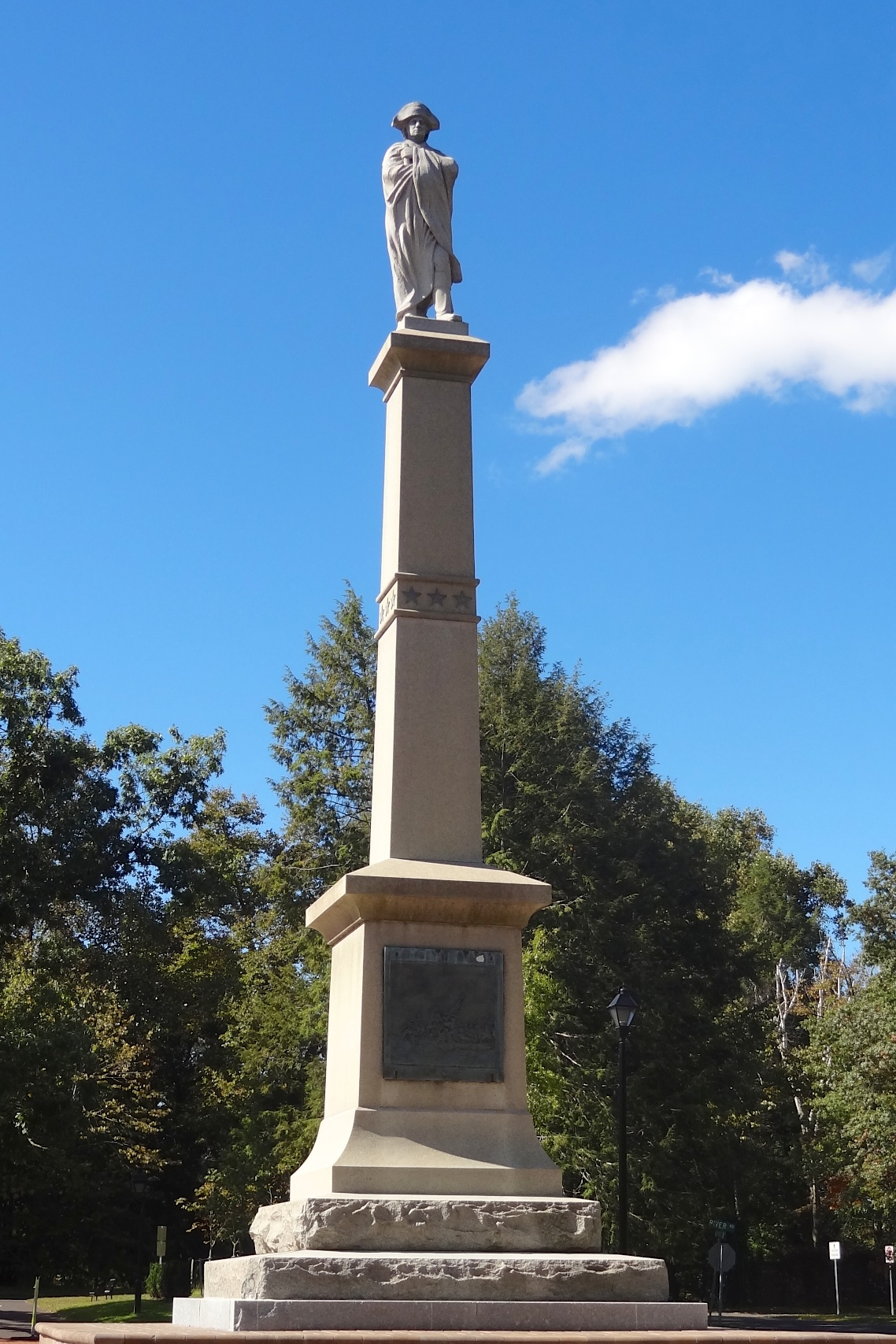
Washington Crossing Monument

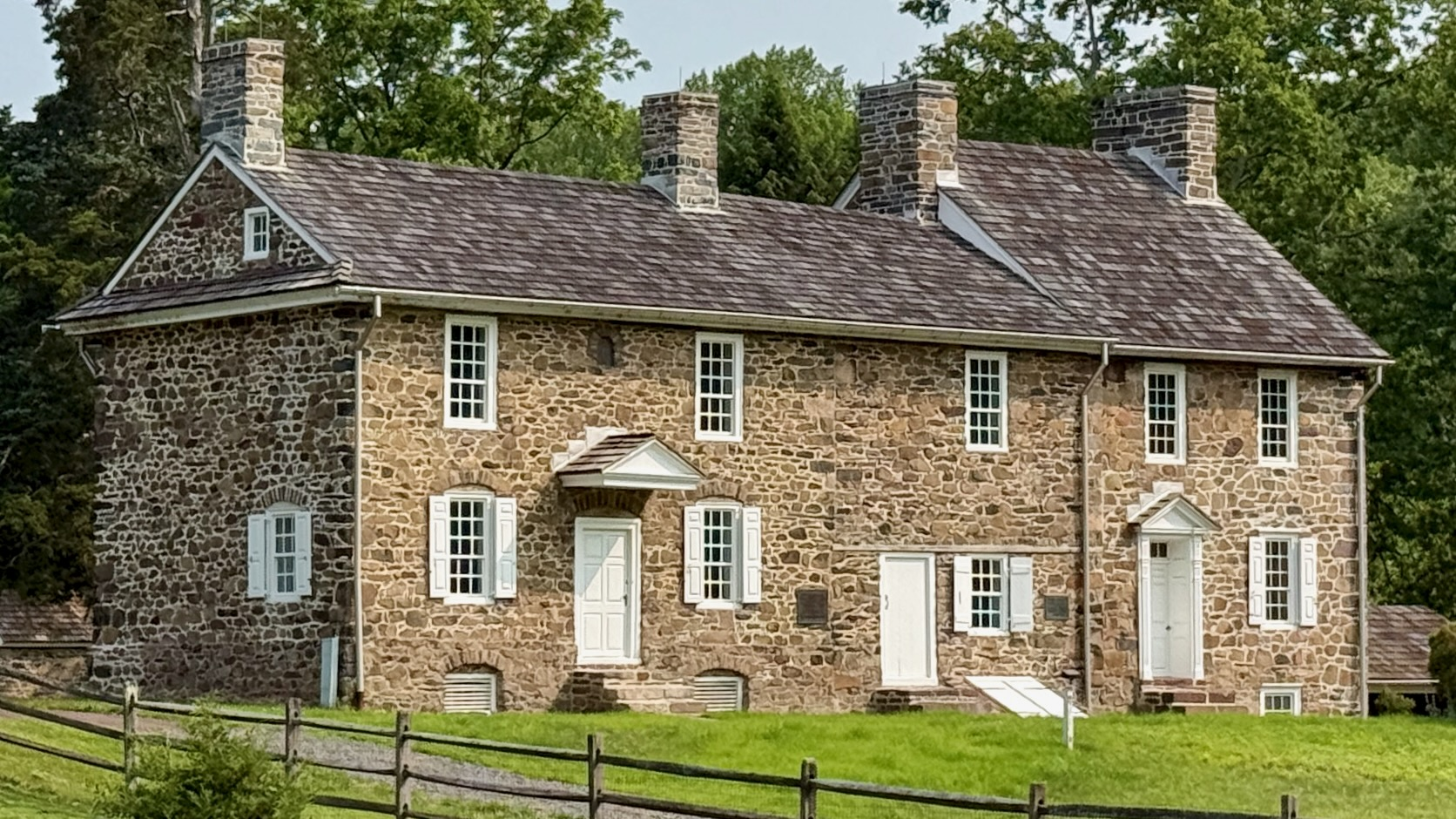
Thompson-Neely House

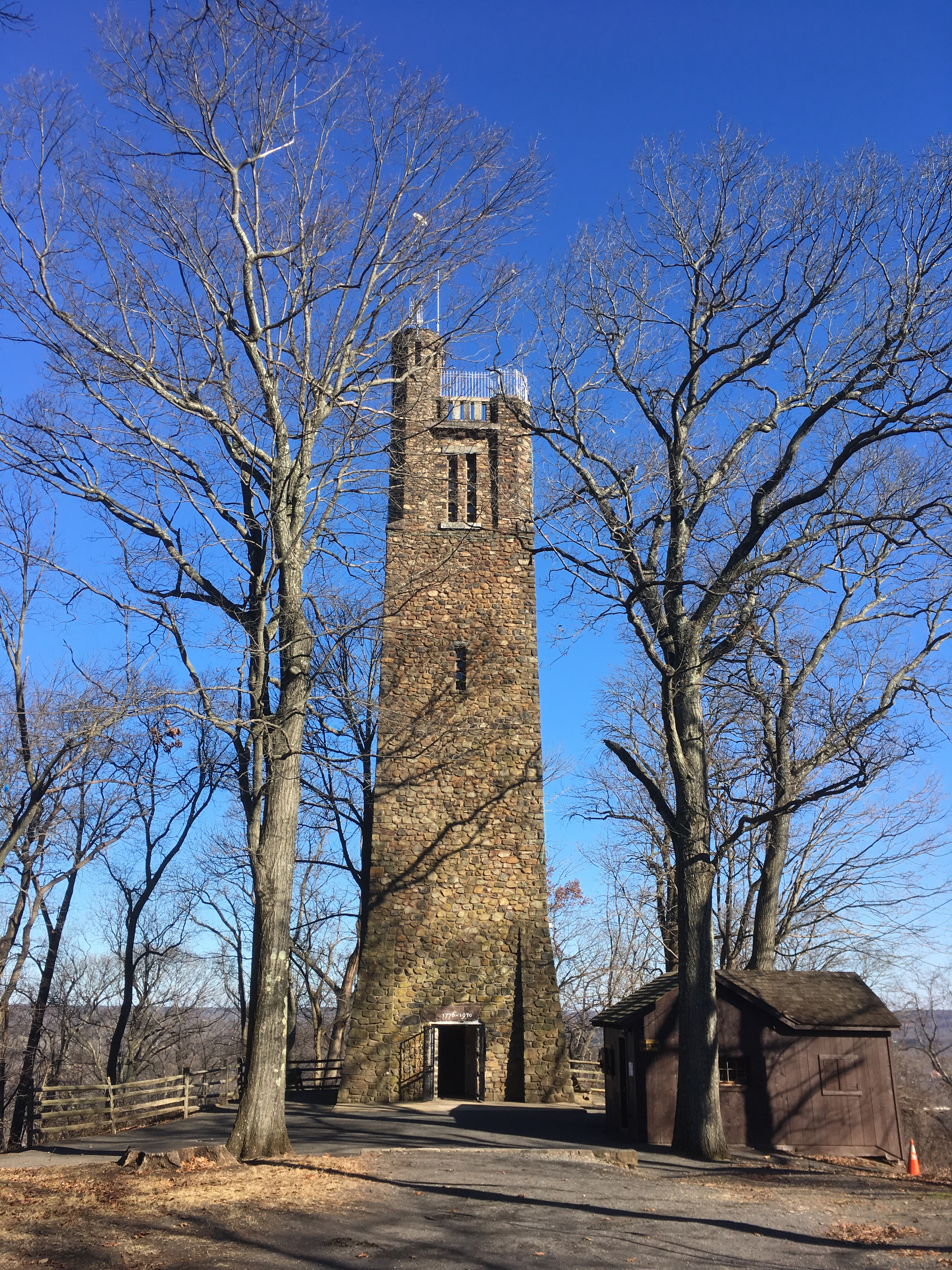
Bowman's Hill Tower

== See also ==
- List of Pennsylvania state parks
- National Register of Historic Places listings in Bucks County, Pennsylvania
- Bowman's Tower, within the park
- Bowman's Hill Wildflower Preserve, within the park
