= Washington's Crossing =

- U.S. National Register of Historic Places
- U.S. National Historic Landmark
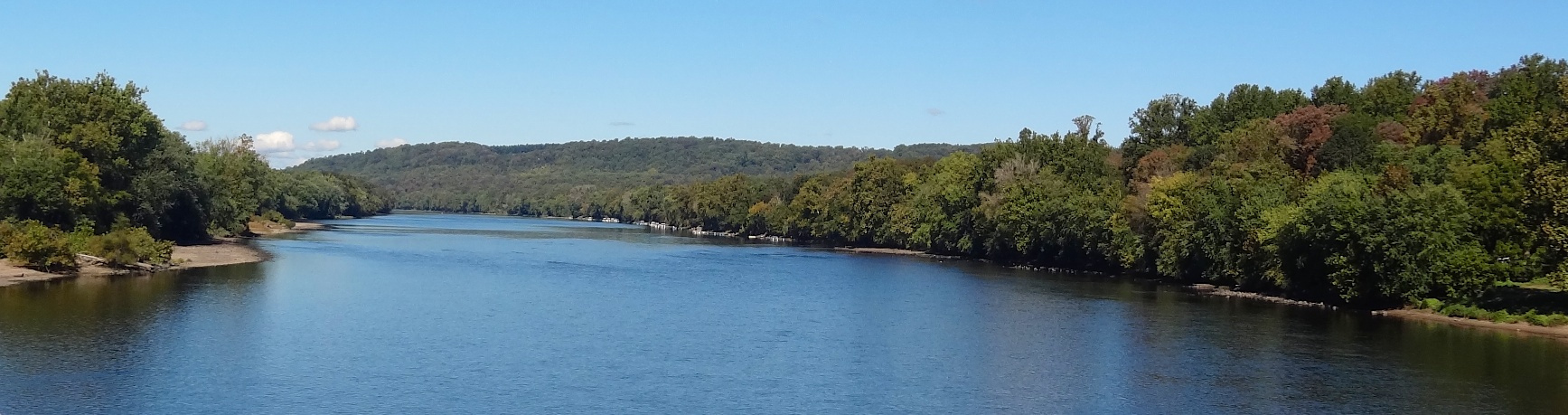
- View of the ferry crossing site in 2013

- Location within Mercer County, New Jersey Location within New Jersey Location within Pennsylvania Location within the United States
- Nearest city: Titusville, New Jersey, and Yardley, Pennsylvania
- Coordinates: 40°17′47″N 74°52′10″W
- Area: 872 acres (353 ha)
- Built: 1776
- NRHP reference No.: 66000650

Significant dates
- Added to NRHP: October 15, 1966
- Designated NHL: January 20, 1961

Washington's Crossing is the location of George Washington's crossing of the Delaware River on the night of December 25–26, 1776 in the American Revolutionary War. This maneuver led to victory in the Battle of Trenton. The site, a National Historic Landmark, is composed of U.S. state parks in Washington Crossing, New Jersey, and Washington Crossing, Pennsylvania, north of Trenton, New Jersey.

== Description and history ==
The Washington's Crossing site is located north of Yardley, Pennsylvania and Trenton, New Jersey. The main commemorative sites are located north of the Washington Crossing Bridge spanning the river. A reenactment of the crossing is performed every December.

=== Pennsylvania side ===
Washington Crossing Historic Park encapsulates the crossing site on the Pennsylvania side. Covering about 500 acres (200 ha), it includes the actual embarkation site for the main crossing, and a 19th-century inn set on the foundation of an 18th-century inn that was present at the time of the crossing. A memorial marker indicates the site of the crossing. The park also includes a detached unit 4 miles (6.4 km) north of the crossing site, where Bowman's Hill Tower, the Thompson-Neely House, and a grist mill that served the army are located.

=== New Jersey side ===
Washington Crossing State Park includes the New Jersey side of the crossing site. It is at over 3,500 acres (1,400 ha), much larger than the Pennsylvania park. It includes a broader array of recreational amenities, including a visitors center, nature center, astronomical observatory, campground, and open-air theater. Elements specifically relating to the crossing including the Johnson Ferry House and a stretch of the original roadway traversed by the army.

== See also ==
- List of National Historic Landmarks in New Jersey
- List of National Historic Landmarks in Pennsylvania
