= Bowman's Hill Tower =

Place in Pennsylvania, United States

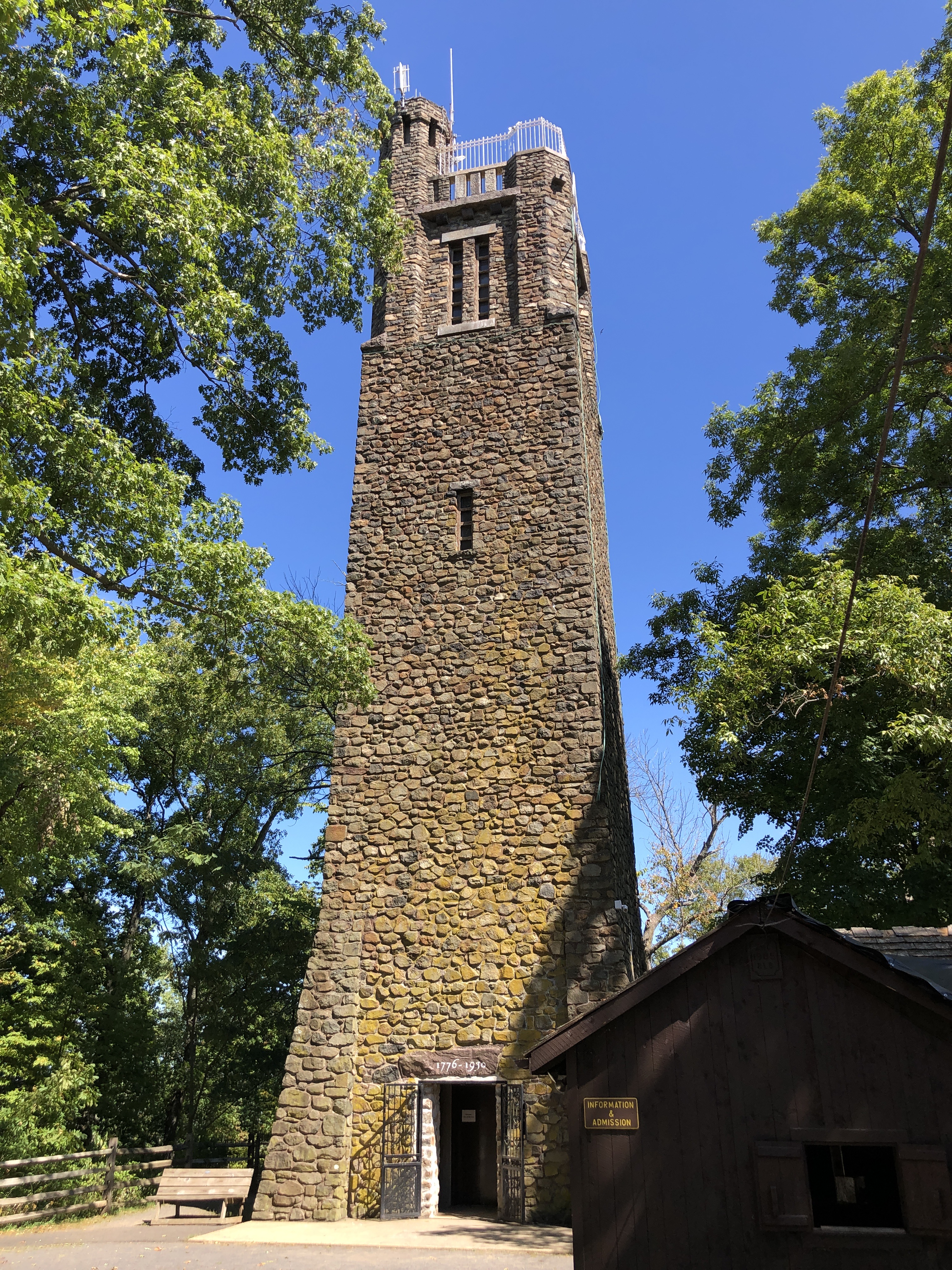
- Bowman's Hill Tower
- Interactive map of Bowman's Hill Tower
- Coordinates: 40.32613°N 74.93808°W
- State: Pennsylvania
- County: Bucks
- Municipality: Upper Makefield Township

Bowman's Hill Tower, (also known as Bowman's Tower), is a 125-foot-tall (38 m) stone tower located within Washington Crossing Historic Park in Upper Makefield Township, Bucks County, Pennsylvania. It is administered by the Pennsylvania Department of Conservation and Natural Resources. The tower was built just northeast of the summit of Bowman's Hill. The tower was erected in the 1930s as a memorial.

== Tower ==
Construction on Bowman's Hill Tower began in 1929 and was completed in 1931. It stands 125 feet tall and its base measures 24 feet on each side. The tower was constructed from native stone quarried from Bowman's Hill and nearby stone fences. Quarries in Lumberville, Pennsylvania and Lawrenceville, New Jersey provided cut stone to be used for the sills and balustrades. Over 2,400 short tons (2,200,000 kg) of materials were used in its construction, including; 1,200 perch of stone, 517 short tons (469,000 kg) of sand and 225 short tons (204,000 kg) tons of cement. In order to provide a solid foundation for the tower, the base was excavated 15 feet (4.6 m). The labor for the construction was provided by employees of the Washington Crossing Park Commission. Including labor, the tower cost $100,000 to build.

By 1934 the Tower was struck many times by lightning which resulted in the installation of a lightning protection system by the National Lightning Protection Company of St. Louis, Missouri. During the 1930s the Civil Works Administration and the Works Progress Administration planted over 28,300 seedlings in an effort to reforest the area. A large number of erosion control measures were taken to include the setting of large numbers of rocks and boulders. Additionally, they created two vistas from the tower to the Delaware River, one on the north side of the hill and the other on the southeast side.

In the 1980s the tower was extensively restored and an elevator was installed. Previously visitors climbed an open stone spiral staircase to the observation point at the top of the tower. An elevator now goes three-quarters of the way to the top and lets out onto a stone landing. Visitors must then climb a small and narrow 23-step stone spiral staircase to the tower roof. Additionally, there is a parapet over the final stairs that gives the tower its distinctive look.

== Park ==
The Commonwealth of Pennsylvania created the Washington Crossing Historic Park in 1917, and then established the Washington Crossing Park Commission to administer and develop the park in 1919. The park also contains the Thompson-Neely House, a historic house (possibly built in 1702)and farmstead in Solebury Township, Bucks County, Pennsylvania.

== Name ==
There is no definitive source for the name Bowman, however there are several theories:

1. The original name was Beau Mont which was paired with Belle Mont, a similar hill in New Jersey. There was a John Beaumont who owned the original land in 1783. His tract of land can be seen in the Upper Makefield township building.
2. The hill was named for Thomas Bowman, an English merchant who conducted trade up and down the Delaware River in the 17th century.
3. The hill was named for a John Bowman, a friend of Jonathan Pidcock, the first European settler in the area. Pidcock's farm was located in the northeast end of the hill, from which Revolutionary War soldiers encamped on the farm, then owned by a Robert Thompson.
4. Refers to a Doctor John Bowman (possibly the same John Bowman as above), allegedly ship's surgeon to Captain Kidd. Dr Bowman was thought to have retired to eastern Pennsylvania after his time at sea and is said to be buried somewhere on the hill. The legend goes on in claiming that pirate treasure may be buried on the hill.

Note: a Burial placard on the hill commemorates a John Pidcock, early settler of the area, and not Dr. Bowman.

== Mine ==
In 1854, an accident led to the discovery of a mine on the west side of Bowman's hill. It was later excavated in search of copper. The supervising engineer was of the opinion that the mine was originally created by Germans.

== Vistas ==
- To the east, a large American Flag can be seen over an American Revolutionary War cemetery containing the graves of 23 Continental Army soldiers, 22 of them are unknown.
- Also to the east, the large, now closed quarry on the west side of Baldpate Mountain.
- The Thompson-Neely House, an 18th-century stone farmhouse with a gristmill, located down the hill and across the street (River Road) to the east.
- To the northwest, the New Hope-Lambertville Bridge connecting New Hope, Pennsylvania and Lambertville, New Jersey, and the U.S. Route 202 bridge.
- To the south east, Trenton, New Jersey and Morrisville, Pennsylvania.
- To the south, Tullytown landfill operated by Waste Management, Inc.
