= Washington Crossing the Delaware (1953 painting) =

1953 painting by Larry Rivers

- Artist: Larry Rivers
- Year: 1953
- Location: Museum of Modern Art
- Accession: 25.1955

Washington Crossing the Delaware is a 1953 painting by the New York painter Larry Rivers. Made of charcoal, oil paint, and linen, it is painted on linen and is in the collection of the Museum of Modern Art in New York City. In 1958, it was damaged by fire. In his autobiography, Rivers claimed it was not a variation on the 1851 painting with the same name by Emanuel Leutze but an Americanized reflection on Leo Tolstoy's War and Peace and a subversion of the abstract Expressionism of the time. However, some sources disagree with this, calling it a "variation of the famous 1851 painting."

== See also ==
- List of paintings of George Washington
