= David Shulman =

American lexicographer and cryptographer

David Shulman (November 12, 1912 – October 30, 2004) was an American lexicographer and cryptographer.

Shulman contributed many early usages to the Oxford English Dictionary and is listed among "Readers and contributors from collections" for the 1989 second edition of the OED. He said that he felt most at home in the New York Public Library, undertaking his lexicographic research there and donating many valuable items to it. Shulman described himself as "the Sherlock Holmes of Americanisms".

Shulman was a member of the American Cryptogram Association from 1933, and was a champion Scrabble player. At the age of 23 he wrote "Washington Crossing the Delaware," a 14-line sonnet in which every line is an anagram of the title.

== Works ==
- Shulman, David. An Annotated Bibliography of Cryptography. New York, London: Garland Publishing Co., 1976.
- Shulman, David. Supplement to An Annotated Bibliography of Cryptography. 1985.
- "Scientists Baffled: George Washington Spotted on Venus!!!" in Chapter 14: "On the Untranslatable" in Le Ton beau de Marot: In Praise of the Music of Language, by Douglas R. Hofstadter. pp. 438–439

== See also ==
- Anagrammatic poem
