= Magnetic Poetry =

Creative writing aid

- Invented by: Dave Kapell
- Company: Magnetic Poetry
- Country: United States
- Materials: magnets
- Official website

Magnetic Poetry is a toy and creative writing aid consisting of individual words—often related to a particular theme or topic—printed on small magnets which can be creatively arranged into poetry on a refrigerator or other metal surface. The informality and spontaneity of Magnetic Poetry has endeared it to educators in creative writing.

== History ==
Magnetic Poetry was invented in 1993 by Dave Kapell, who was then a songwriter. While suffering writer's block, he wrote words on pieces of paper and rearranged them, hoping to use it as a starting point for lyrics. To keep the arrangements of words from being accidentally disturbed, he thought to glue the paper to magnets. After placing the magnets on his refrigerator, visitors to his home would also rearrange the words, creating their own impromptu compositions.

Kapell then designed versions of the magnets for sale at Calhoun Square, Minneapolis, USA. His initial run of 100 boxes sold out in three hours. He has since published a number of books describing the use of the kit and anthologizing poems produced with it.

== See also ==
- Vocabularyclept poetry
- Cut-up technique
