= Thompson-Neely House =

- U.S. Historic district – Contributing property
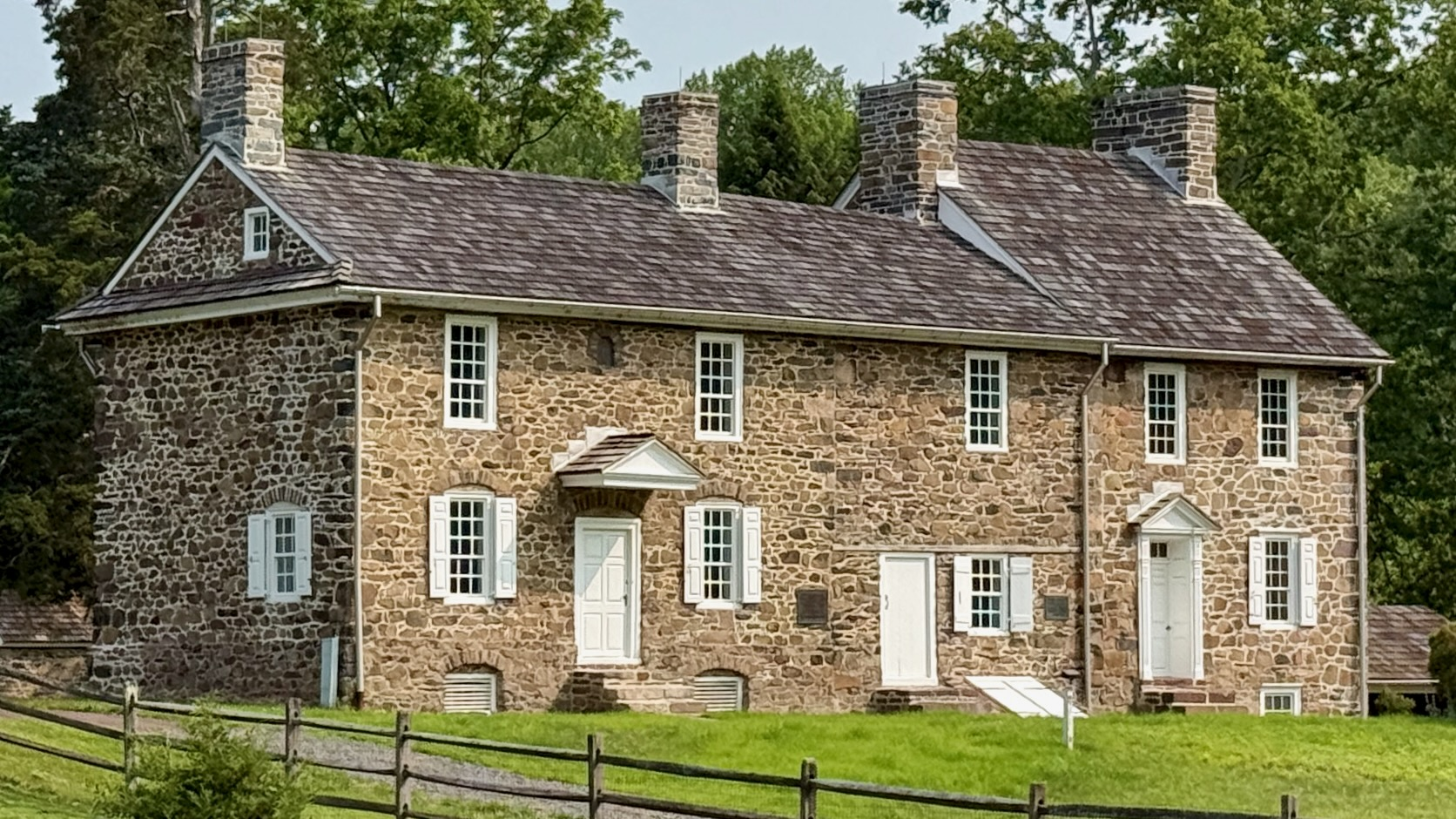
- Thompson-Neely House in 2025

- Location within Pennsylvania
- Location: River Road, Solebury Township, Pennsylvania
- Coordinates: 40°19′51″N 74°56′16″W
- Built: c. 1702
- Part of: Washington's Crossing (ID66000650)
- Designated CP: October 15, 1966

The Thompson-Neely house is a historic house and farmstead in Solebury Township, Bucks County, Pennsylvania. It is part of Washington Crossing Historic Park, headquartered in nearby Washington Crossing. The oldest part of the house was built in 1702, according to the John Pidcock plaque. It was a temporary military hospital during the American Revolutionary War.

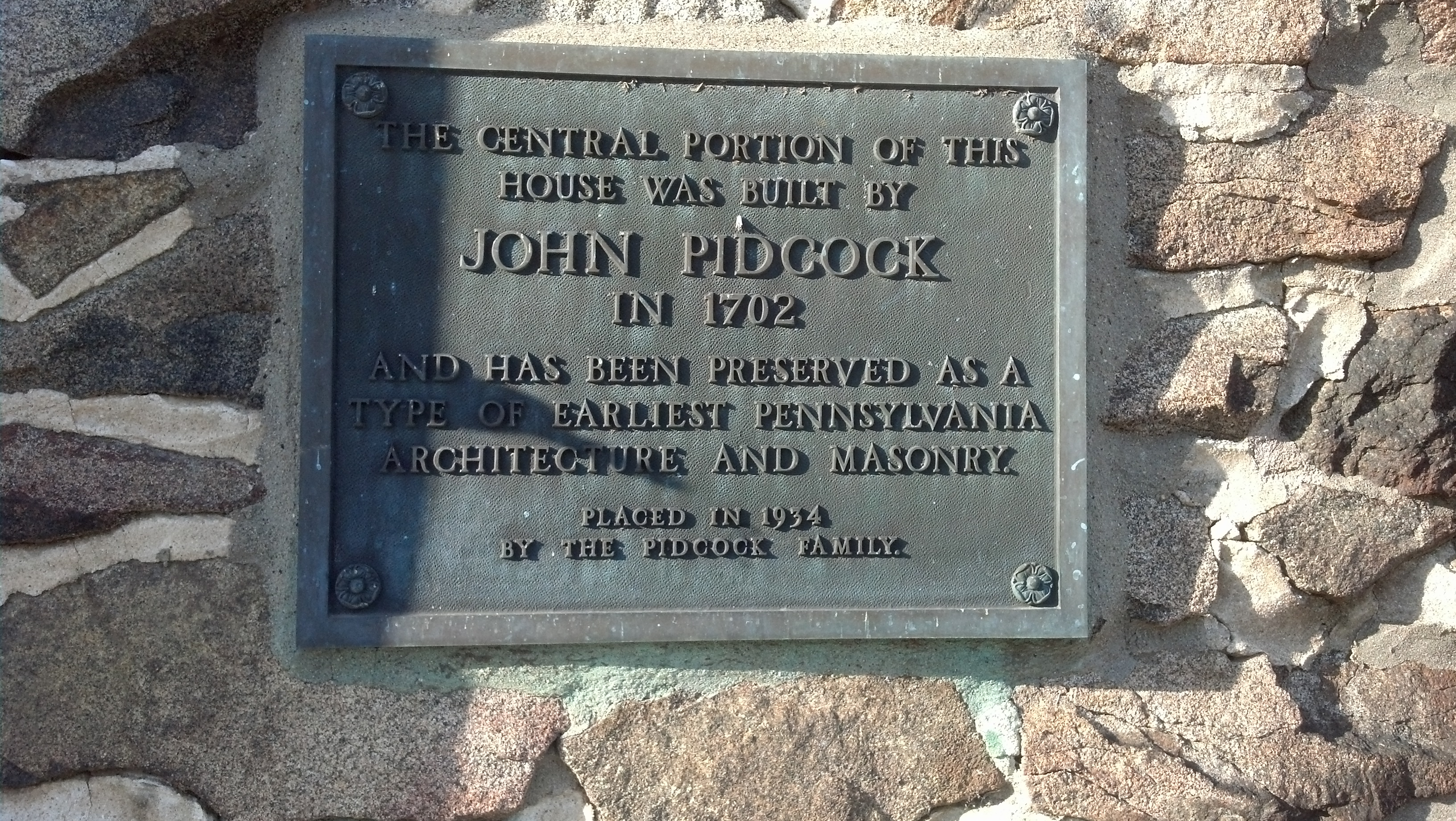
Description of John Pidcock's Contribution

== See also ==
- List of Washington's Headquarters during the Revolutionary War
