= Washington Crossing the Delaware (sonnet) =

1936 poem

"Washington Crossing the Delaware" is a sonnet that was written in 1936 by David Shulman. The title and subject of the poem refer to the scene in the 1851 painting Washington Crossing the Delaware by Emanuel Gottlieb Leutze. The poem is noted for being an anagrammatic poem – in this case, a 14-line rhyming sonnet in which every line is an anagram of the title.

== Text ==
A hard, howling, tossing water scene.
Strong tide was washing hero clean.
"How cold!" Weather stings as in anger.
O Silent night shows war ace danger!

The cold waters swashing on in rage.
Redcoats warn slow his hint engage.
When star general's action wish'd "Go!"
He saw his ragged continentals row.

Ah, he stands – sailor crew went going.
And so this general watches rowing.
He hastens – winter again grows cold.
A wet crew gain Hessian stronghold.

George can't lose war with's hands in;
He's astern – so go alight, crew, and win!

== See also ==
- George Washington's crossing of the Delaware River
