= Washington Crossing the Delaware (1851 paintings) =

1851 painting by Emanuel Leutze

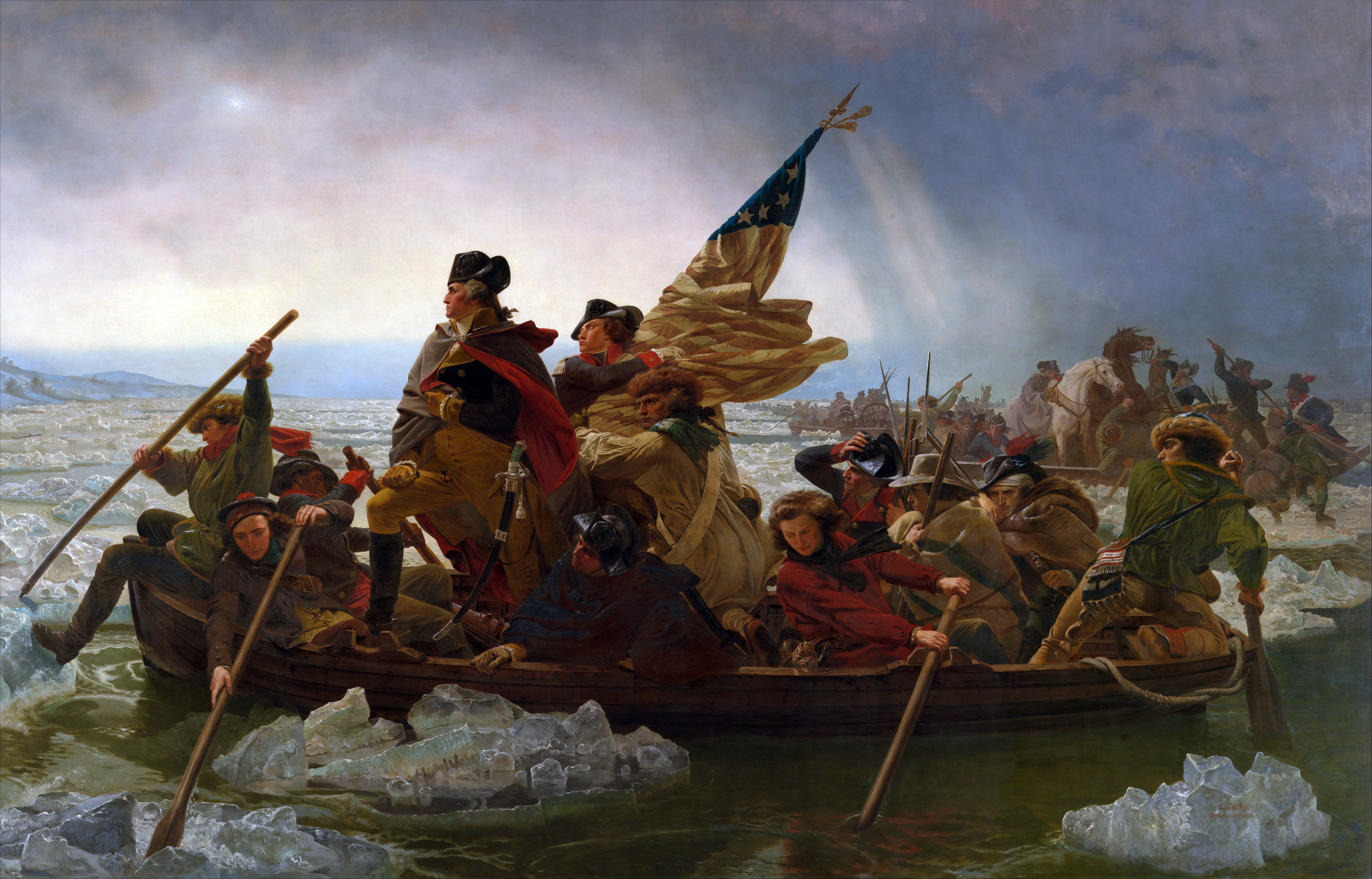
- Artist: Emanuel Leutze
- Year: 1851
- Medium: Oil on canvas
- Dimensions: 378.5 cm × 647.7 cm (149 in × 255 in)
- Location: Metropolitan Museum of Art in New York City and Minnesota Marine Art Museum in Winona, Minnesota, U.S.

Washington Crossing the Delaware is the title of three 1851 oil-on-canvas paintings by the German-American artist Emanuel Leutze depicting General George Washington's crossing of the Delaware River with the Continental Army on the night of December 25–26, 1776, during the American Revolutionary War. Washington's covert crossing of the Delaware River that night was the first of several moves, leading to a surprise attack and victory against Hessian forces at the Battle of Trenton in New Jersey on the morning of December 26.

The original was part of the collection at the Kunsthalle in Bremen, Germany, and was destroyed in a British bombing raid in 1942, during World War II. One of Leutze's other two versions is now in the Metropolitan Museum of Art in New York City. The other was in the West Wing reception area of the White House in Washington, D.C., but in March 2015, was purchased and put on display at the Minnesota Marine Art Museum in Winona, Minnesota. In April 2022 Christie's announced that the smaller painting would be sold at auction the following month, for a pre-sale estimate of $15 million to $20 million. It sold for $45 million.

== History ==
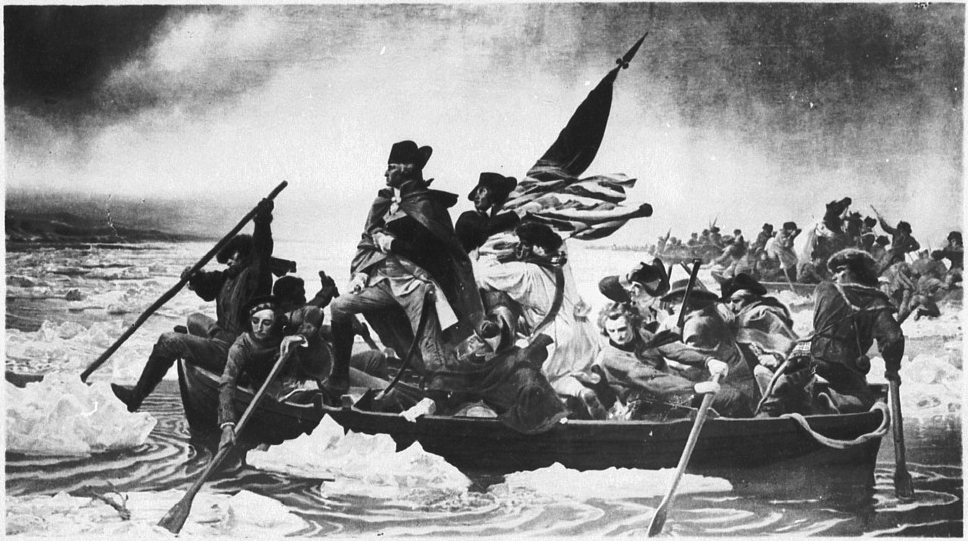
Washington Crossing the Delaware (1849–1850), the first painting by Emanuel Leutze

Emanuel Leutze grew up in America, then returned to Germany as an adult, where he conceived the idea for this painting during the Revolutions of 1848. Hoping to encourage Europe's liberal reformers through the example of the American Revolution, and using American tourists and art students as models and assistants, among them Worthington Whittredge and Andreas Achenbach, Leutze finished the first painting in 1850. Just after it was completed, the first version was damaged by fire in his studio, subsequently restored, and acquired by the Kunsthalle Bremen. On September 5, 1942, during World War II, it was destroyed in a bombing raid by the British Royal Air Force.

The second painting, a full-sized replica of the first, was begun in 1850 and placed on exhibition in New York in October 1851. More than 50,000 people viewed it. The painting was originally bought by Marshall O. Roberts for $10,000—an enormous sum at the time, equivalent to approximately $350,000 in 2021. After changing ownership several times, it was finally donated to the Metropolitan Museum of Art by John Stewart Kennedy in 1897. Washington Rallying the Troops at Monmouth, Leutze's companion piece to Washington Crossing the Delaware, is displayed in the Heyns (East) Reading Room of Doe Library at the University of California, Berkeley.

The painting was lent at least twice in its history. In the early 1950s, it was part of an exhibition in Dallas, Texas. Then, beginning in 1952, it was exhibited for several years at the United Methodist Church in Washington Crossing, Pennsylvania, not far from the scene of the painting. Today, it is on exhibition at the Metropolitan Museum of Art.

In January 2002, the painting was defaced when a former Metropolitan Museum of Art guard glued a picture of the September 11 attacks to it. No major damage was caused to the painting.

The simple frame that had been with the painting for over 90 years turned out not to be the original frame that Leutze designed. A photograph taken by Mathew Brady in 1864 was found in the New-York Historical Society in 2007 showing the painting in a spectacular eagle crested frame. The 12 ft x 21 ft carved replica frame was created using this photo by Eli Wilner & Company in New York City. The carved eagle-topped crest alone is 14 ft wide.

The third version of the painting, a smaller-scale version of the original, hung in the White House receiving room from 1979 to 2014. The painting was acquired by Mary Burrichter and Bob Kierlin, who contributed to the founding of the Minnesota Marine Art Museum in Winona, Minnesota, and put on display as the centerpiece of the museum's American collection.

In May 2022, the third version of the painting was auctioned by Christie's and sold for $45 million.

== Composition ==
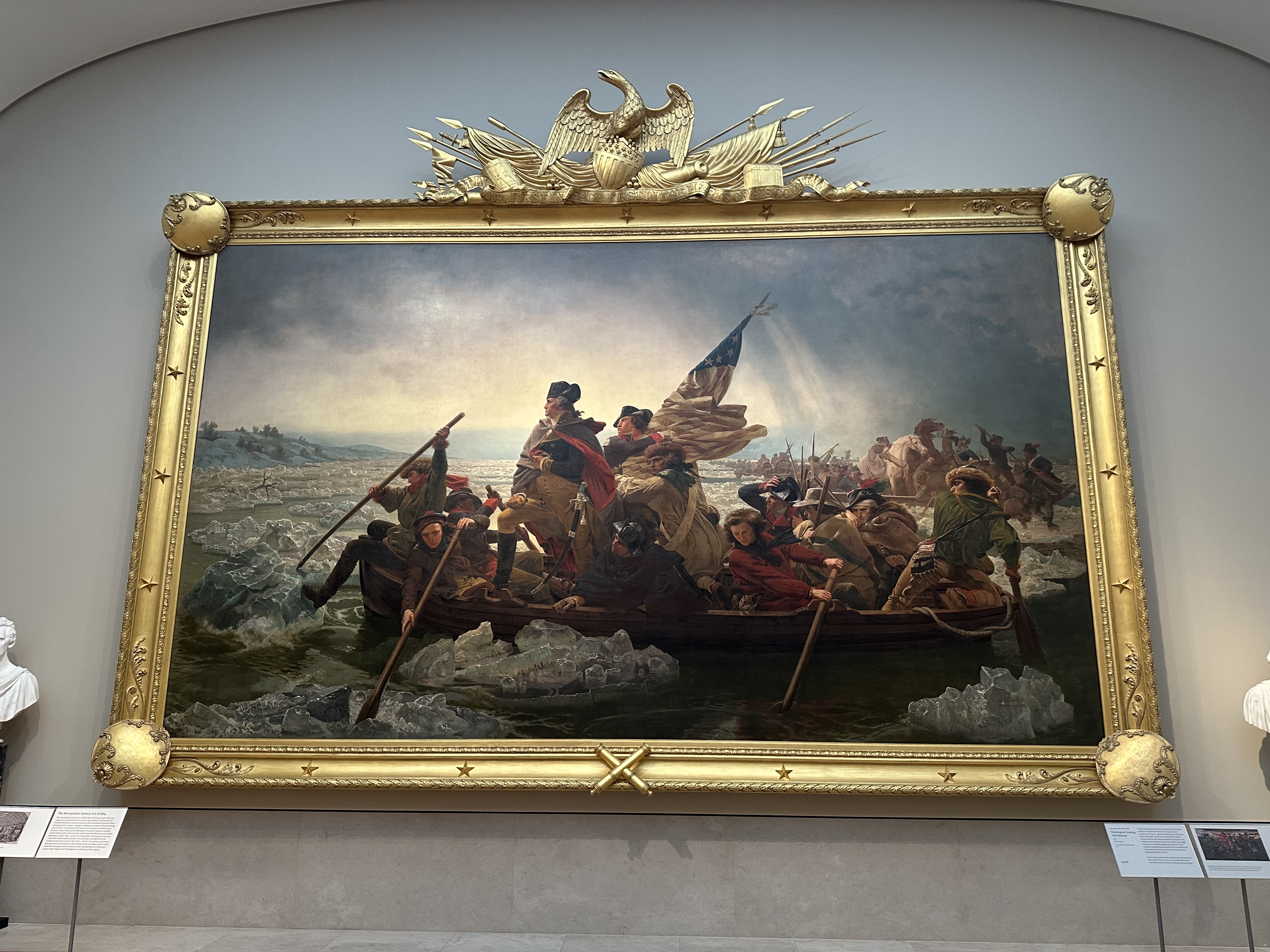
Washington Crossing The Delaware on display at The Metropolitan Museum of Art in New York City in May 2025

The painting is notable for its artistic composition. General Washington is emphasized by an unnaturally bright sky, while his face catches the upcoming sunlight. The colors consist of mostly dark tones, expected at dawn, and there are red highlights repeated throughout the painting. A foreshortening perspective and the distant boats all lend depth to the painting and emphasize the boat carrying Washington. As the painting was done in Düsseldorf, the model of the river in the background is not the Delaware, but the Rhine.

The men in the boat represent a cross-section of the American colonies, including one in a Scottish bonnet and another of African descent facing backward next to each other in the front. A western rifleman is at the bow, two farmers in broad-brimmed hats are near the back (one with a bandaged head), and one at the stern wearing what appears to be Native American clothing to symbolize that all people in the new United States of America were represented.

According to the 1853 exhibition catalogue, the man standing next to Washington and holding the flag is Lieutenant James Monroe, future president of the United States, and the man leaning over the side is General Nathanael Greene. General Edward Hand is shown seated and holding his hat within the vessel.

== Historical inaccuracies ==
The flag depicted is an early version of the flag of the United States (the "Stars and Stripes"), the design of which did not exist at the time of Washington's crossing. The flag's design was first specified in the June 14, 1777, Flag Resolution of the Second Continental Congress, and flew for the first time on September 3, 1777—well after Washington's crossing in 1776. A more historically accurate flag would have been the Continental Union Flag, hoisted by Washington on January 1, 1776, at Somerville, Massachusetts, as the standard of the Continental Army and the first national flag.

Washington's stance, intended to depict him in a heroic fashion, would have been very hard to maintain in the choppy conditions of the crossing. Considering that he is standing in a rowboat, such a stance would have risked capsizing the boat. However, historian David Hackett Fischer has argued that everyone would have been standing up to avoid the icy water in the bottom of the boat, as the actual Durham boats used were much larger, had a flat bottom, higher sides, a broad beam (width) of some eight feet and a draft of 24–30 inches. Washington's boats were actually substantially larger than the boat in the painting. Washington and his men sailed on a cargo ship that ranged anywhere between 40 and 60 feet long (12 to 18 m). Also on the ships were heavy artillery and horses, which would not have fit in the boat Leutze painted.

== Influence ==
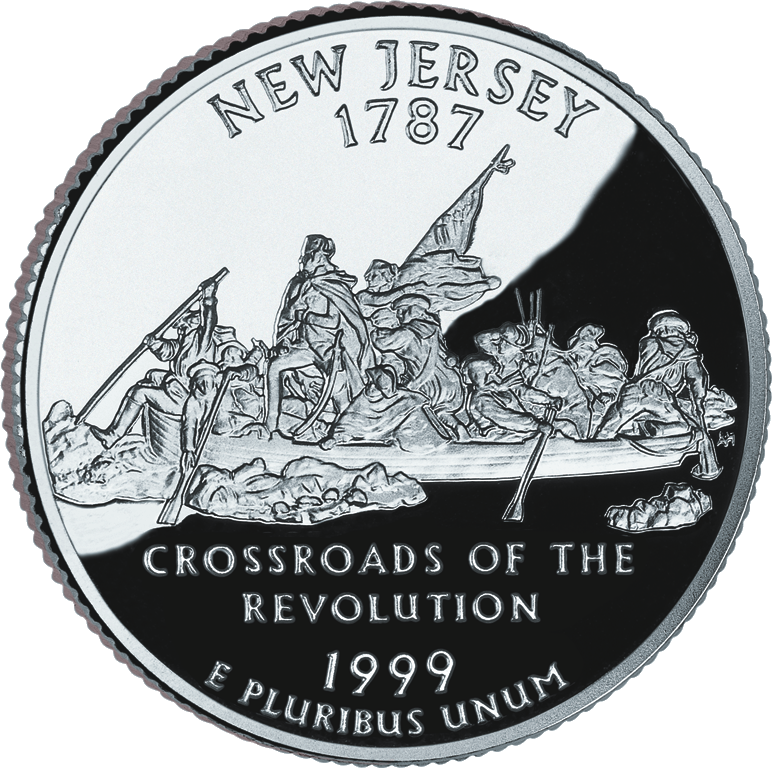
The painting depicted on the 1999 New Jersey state quarter

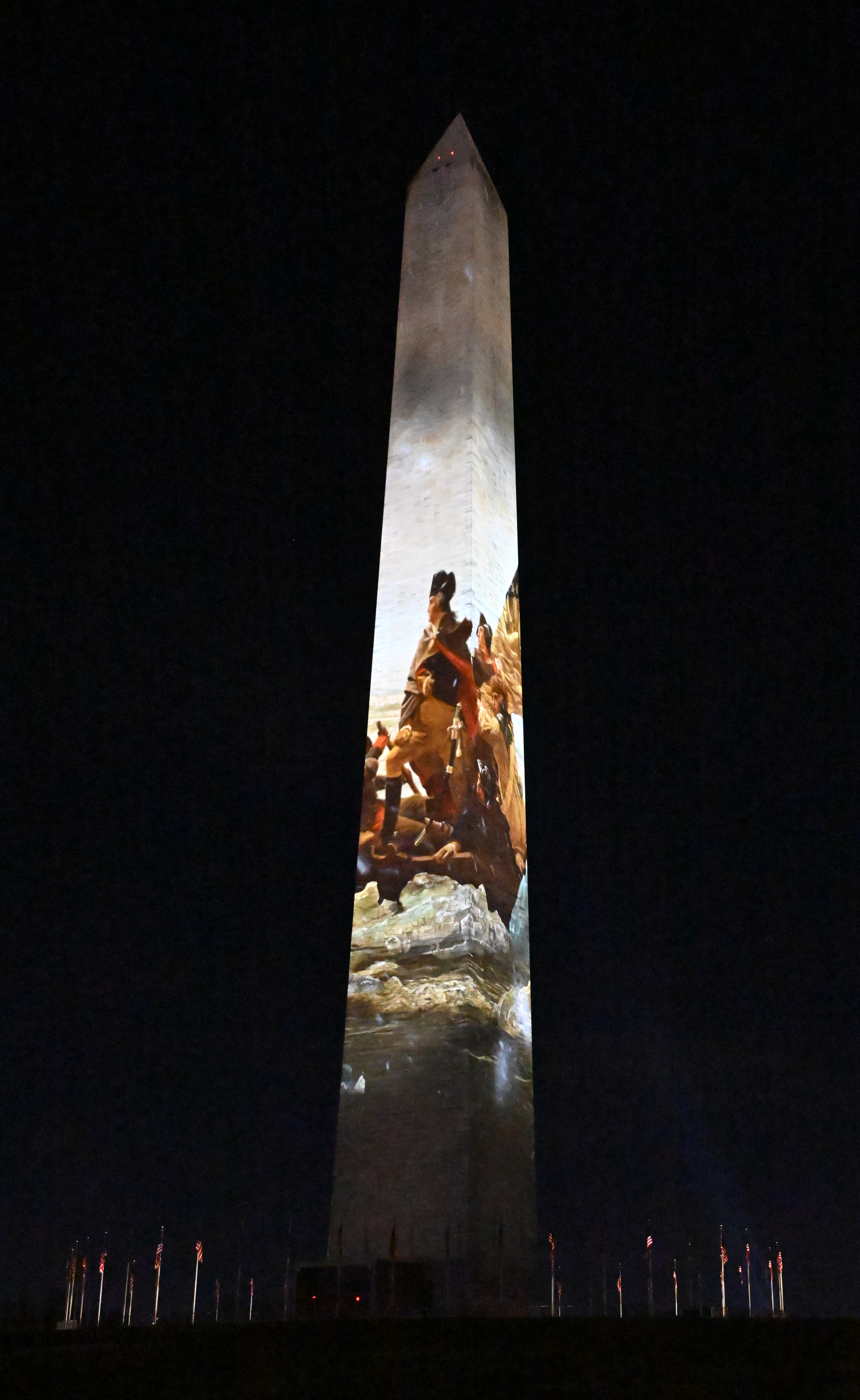
Washington Crossing the Delaware was projected on the Washington Monument in January 2026 during the United States Semiquincentennial celebrations.

"Washington Crossing the Delaware" is a 1936 sonnet by David Shulman. It refers to the scene in the painting, and is a 14-line rhyming sonnet of which every line is an anagram of the title.

In 1953, the American pop artist Larry Rivers painted Washington Crossing the Delaware, which is in the collection of The Museum of Modern Art in New York City. The painting has also inspired copies by Roy Lichtenstein (an abstract expressionist variant painted c. 1951) and Robert Colescott (a parody titled George Washington Carver Crossing the Delaware painted in 1975). Grant Wood makes direct use of Leutze's painting in his own Daughters of Revolution. The painting is a direct jab at the Daughters of the American Revolution, scrutinizing what Wood interpreted as their unfounded elitism.

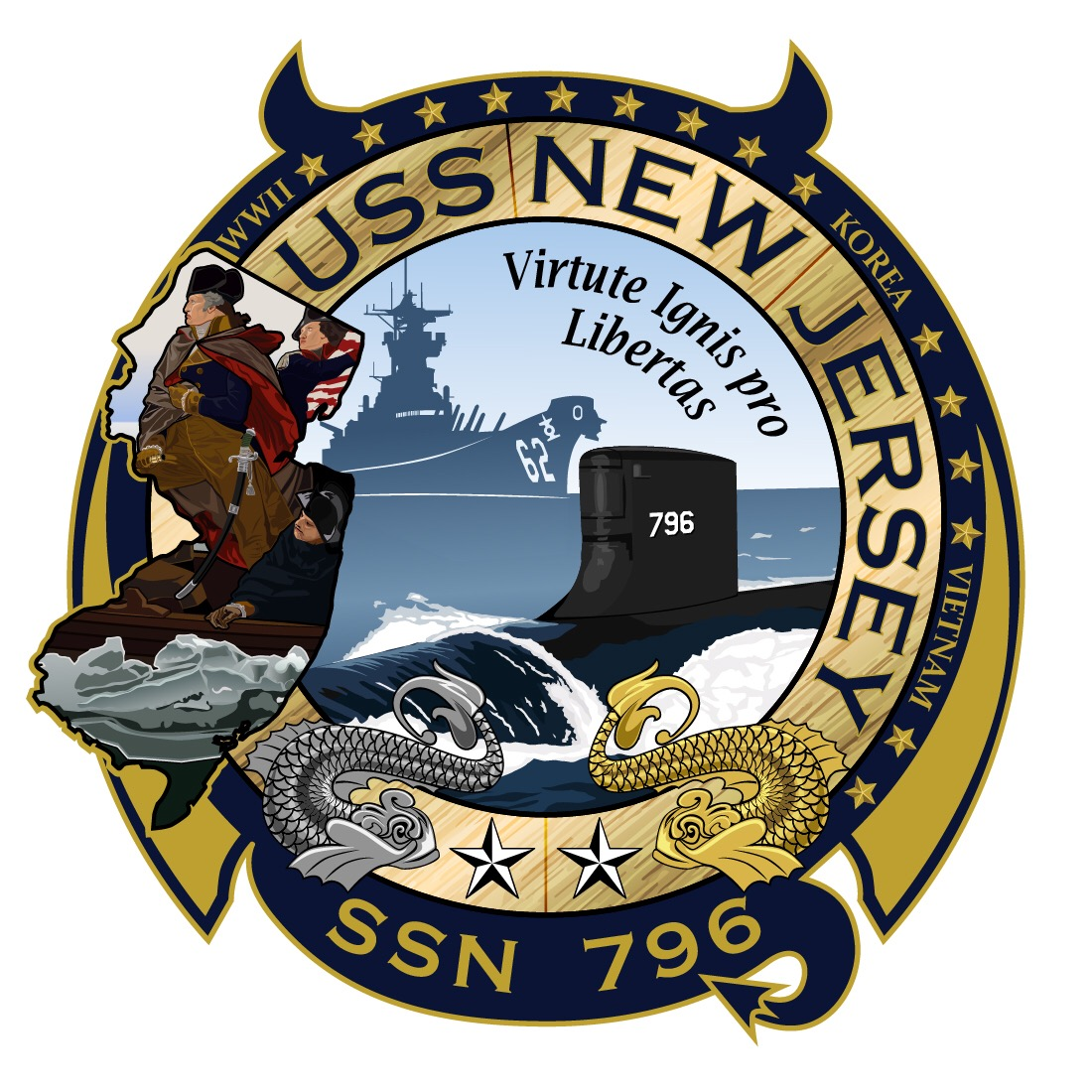
A portion of the painting is depicted on the badge of USS New Jersey (SSN-796)

William H. Powell produced a painting that owes an artistic debt to Leutze's work, depicting Oliver Perry transferring command from one ship to another during the Battle of Lake Erie during the War of 1812. The original painting now hangs in the Ohio Statehouse, and Powell later created a larger, more light-toned rendering of the same subject which hangs in the U.S. Capitol in Washington, D.C. In both of Powell's works, Perry is shown standing in a small boat rowed by several men in uniform. The Washington painting shows the direction of travel from right to left, and the Perry image shows a reverse direction of motion, but the two compositions are otherwise similar. Both paintings feature one occupant of the boat with a bandaged head.

Liverpool born pop artist, Dirty Hans's painting "British Invasion" showing various rock and pop cultural icons from the 1960s, 70s and 80s in a boat crossing the Hudson River in New York and depicting David Bowie as a proxy for George Washington, appears to have drawn heavy influence from this painting

== In popular culture ==
Professional wrestler LA Knight parodied this painting in his merchandise during his reign as United States Champion.

The Far Side comic for October 15, 1986, parodied the painting as "Washington crossing the street".

== See also ==
- The Passage of the Delaware, 1819 painting by Thomas Sully
- Art in the White House
- List of paintings of George Washington

== Sources ==
- Anne Hawkes Hutton, Portrait of Patriotism: Washington Crossing the Delaware. Chilton Book Company, 1975. ISBN 0-8019-6418-0. A detailed history of the painting, the actual crossing of the Delaware by American forces, and the life of Emanuel Gottlieb Leutze.
- Fischer, David Hackett (2004). Washington's Crossing. Oxford, England; New York: Oxford University Press. ISBN 0-19-517034-2.
- Barratt, Carrie Rebora (Fall 2011). "Washington Crossing the Delaware and the Metropolitan Museum". The Metropolitan Museum of Art Bulletin: 5–19.
- Howat, John K. (March 1968). "Washington Crossing the Delaware" (PDF). The Metropolitan Museum of Art Bulletin. 26 (7): 289–299. doi:10.2307/3258337. JSTOR 3258337.
- "Winona museum gets Washington Crossing Delaware painting". Twin Cities.com. Digital First Media. March 24, 2015.
