= Princeton, New Jersey =

- Borough
- The Municipality of Princeton
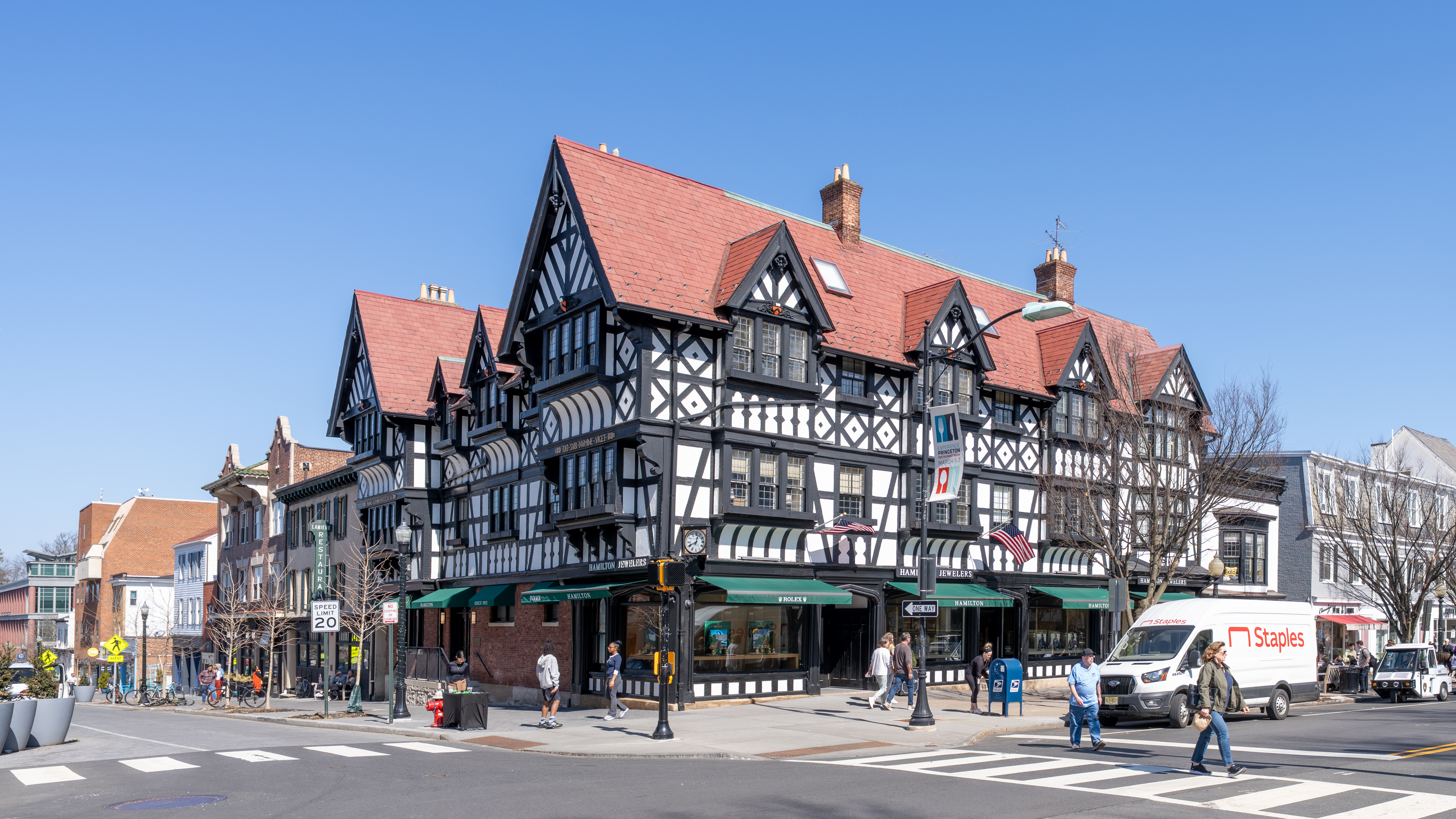
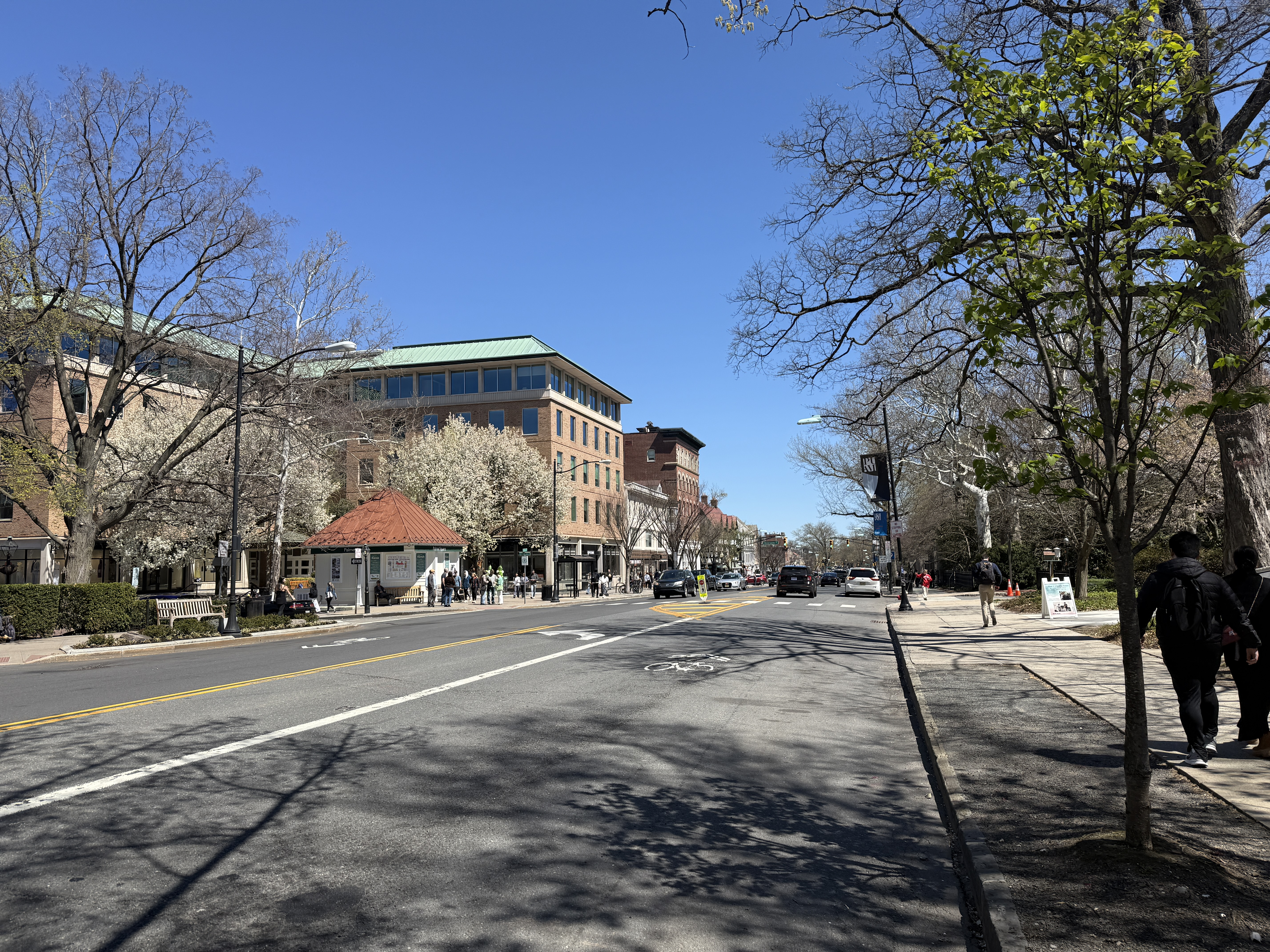
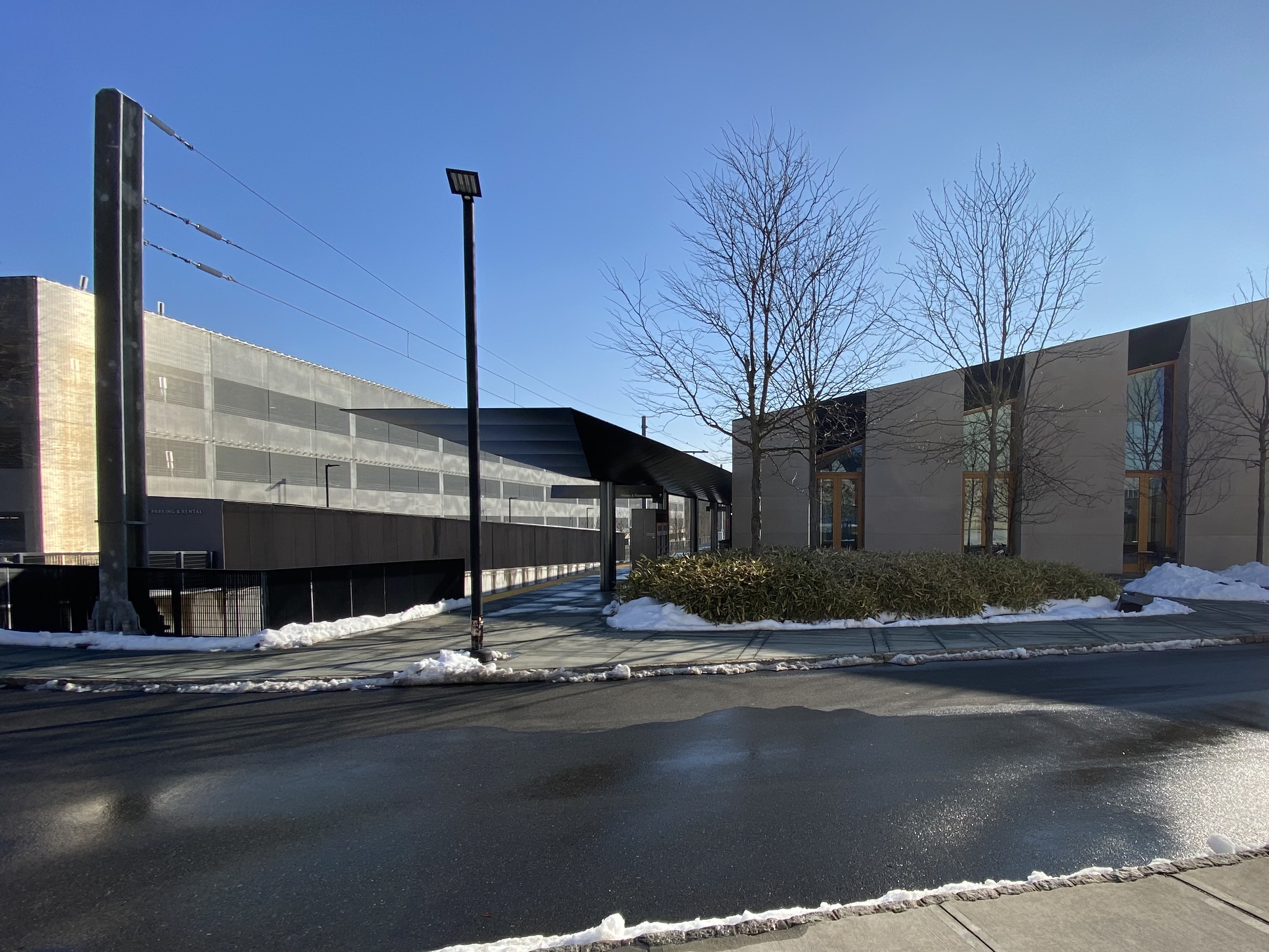
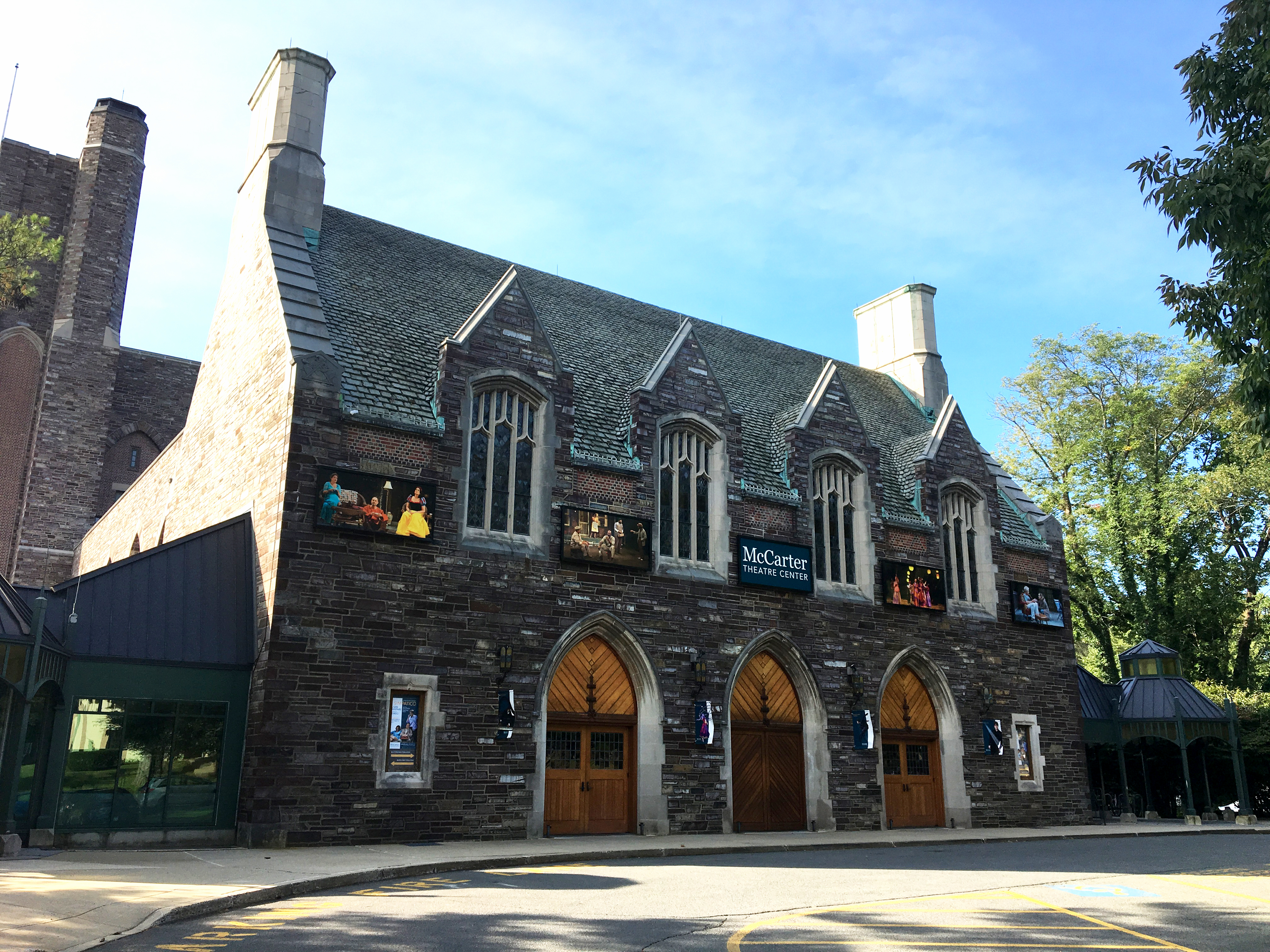
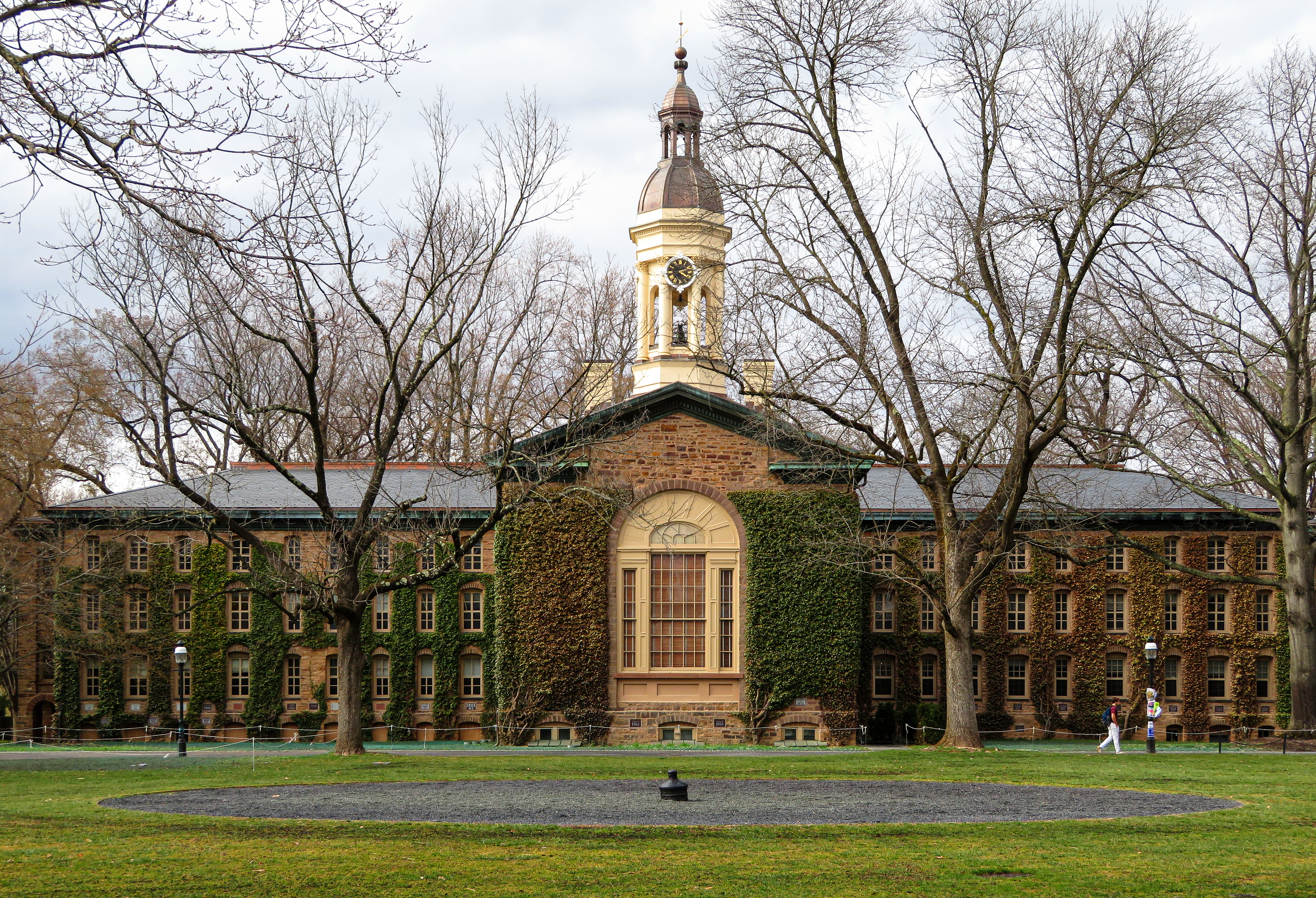
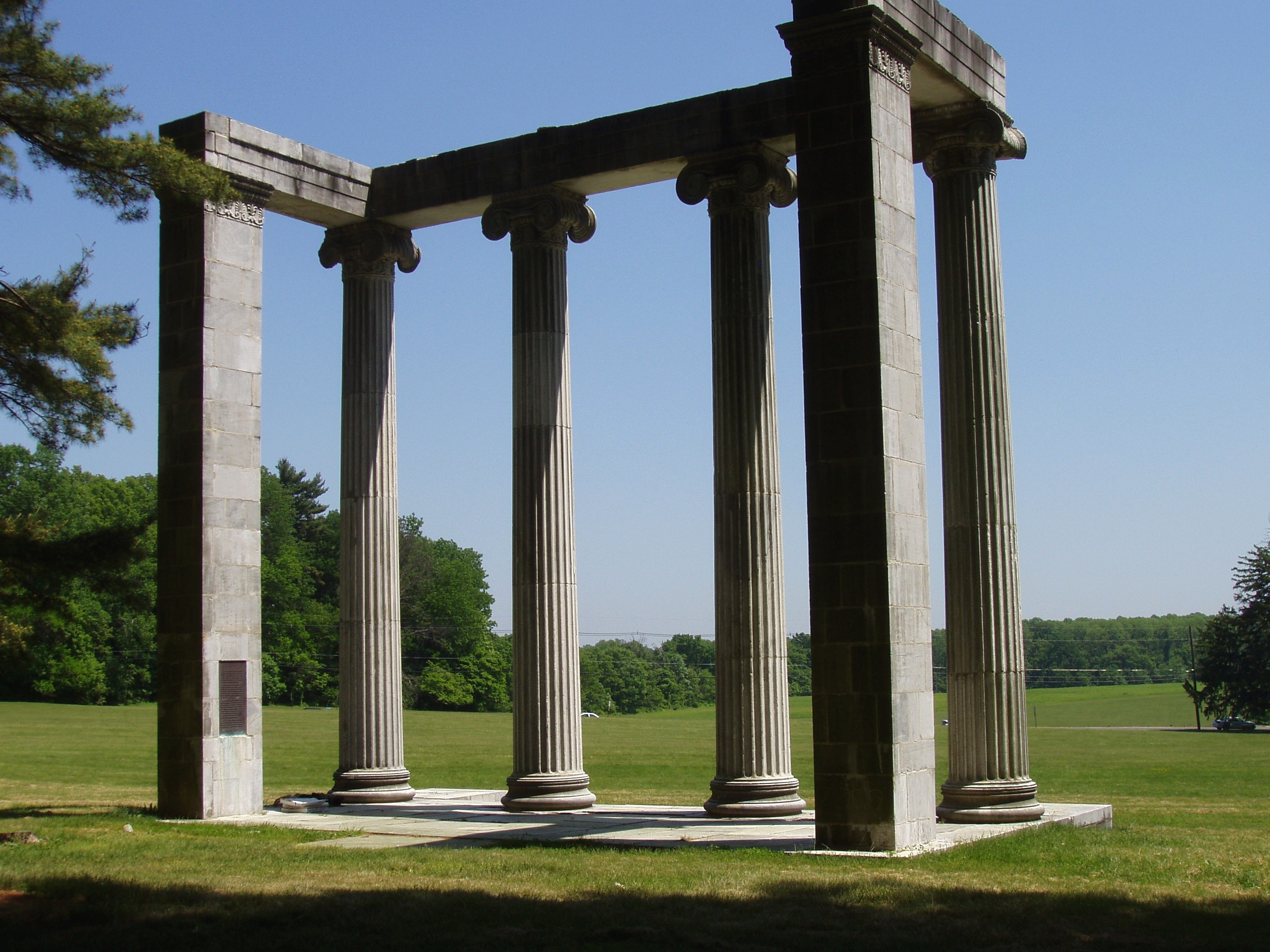
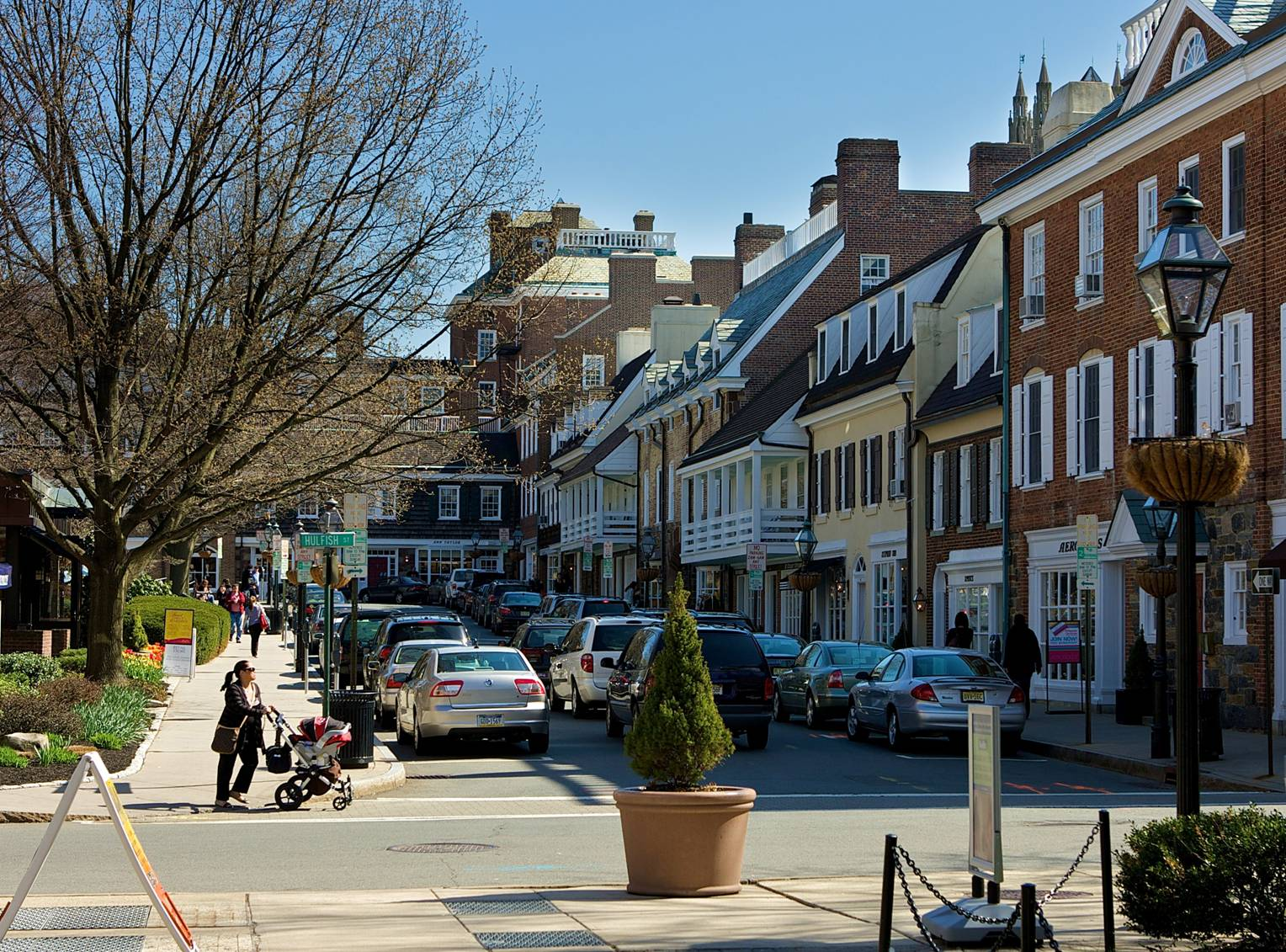
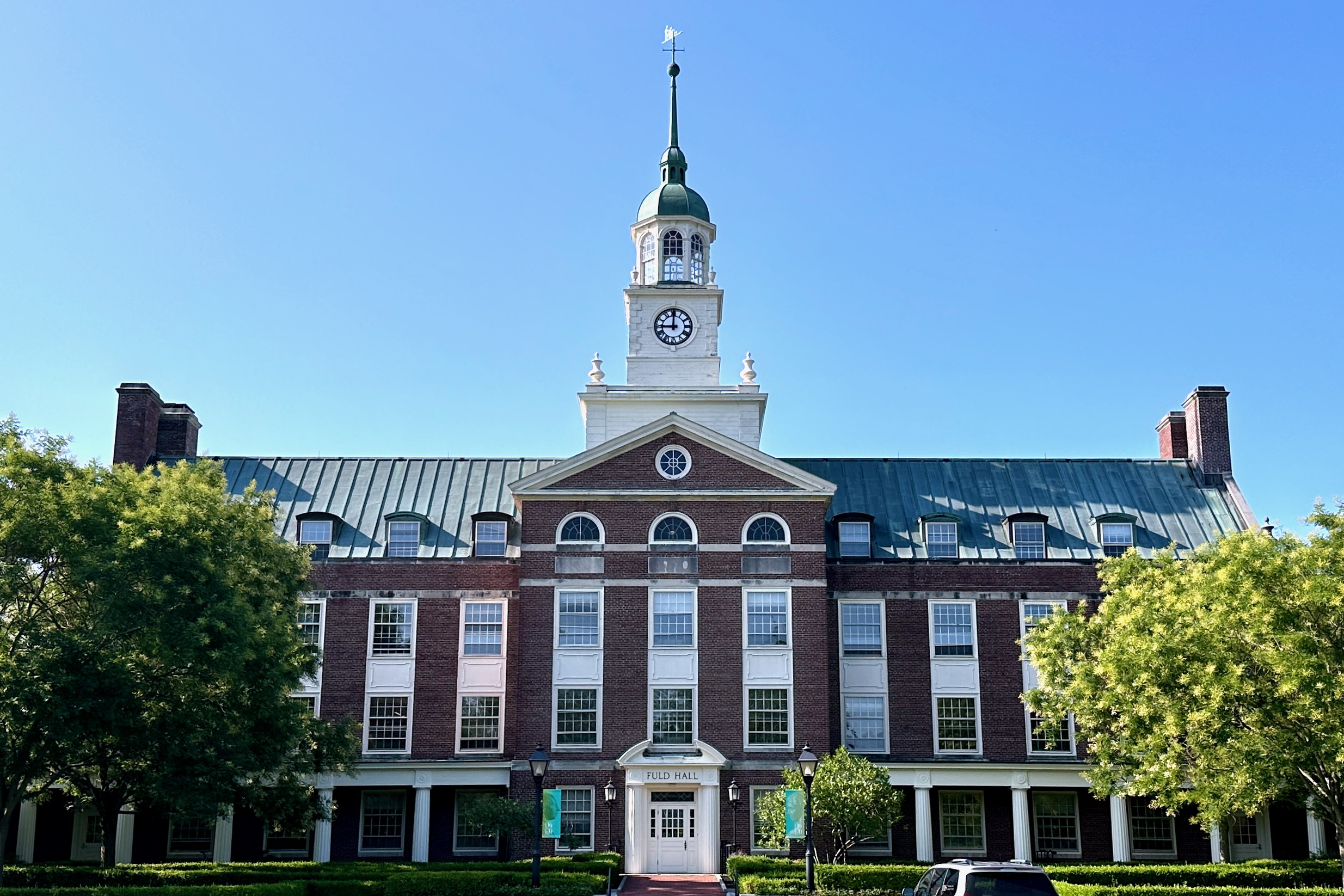
- Lower Pyne building on the corner of Nassau Street and Witherspoon Street, 2026 Nassau Street northbound in Downtown Princeton, 2026 Princeton station, 2020 McCarter Theatre, 2018 Nassau Hall on the campus of Princeton University, 2019 Princeton Battlefield, 2007 Palmer Square, 2013 Institute for Advanced Study, 2023

- Seal

- Location of Princeton in Mercer County and in New Jersey

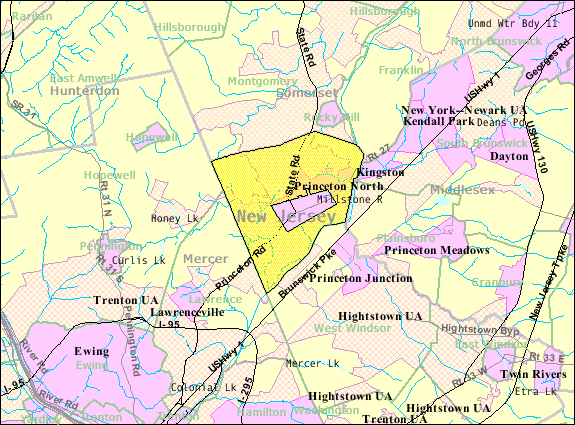
- Census Bureau map of the former Princeton Township (and enclaved Borough in pink), New Jersey
- Interactive map of Princeton, New Jersey
- Location in Mercer County Location in New Jersey Location in the United States
- Coordinates: 40.358244°N 74.666728°W
- Country: United States
- State: New Jersey
- County: Mercer
- Incorporated: January 1, 2013

Government
  - Type: Borough
  - Mayor: Mark Freda (D, term ends December 31, 2028)
  - Administrator: Bernard Hvozdovic Jr.
  - Municipal clerk: Dawn Mount

Area
  - Total: 18.41 sq mi (47.69 km^{2})
  - Land: 17.95 sq mi (46.48 km^{2})
  - Water: 0.47 sq mi (1.21 km^{2}) 2.53%
  - Rank: 154th of 565 in state 6th of 12 in county

Population (2020)
  - Total: 30,681
  - Estimate (2023): 30,289
  - Rank: 78th of 565 in state 5th of 12 in county
  - Density: 1,709.6/sq mi (660.1/km^{2})
  - Rank: 319th of 565 in state 8th of 12 in county
- Time zone: UTC−05:00 (Eastern (EST))
  - Summer (DST): UTC−04:00 (Eastern (EDT))
- ZIP Codes: 08540–08544
- Area code: 609
- FIPS code: 3402160900
- Website: www.princetonnj.gov

The Municipality of Princeton is a borough in Mercer County, in the U.S. state of New Jersey. It was established on January 1, 2013, through the consolidation of the Borough of Princeton and Princeton Township, both of which are now defunct. As of the 2020 United States census, the borough's population was 30,681, an increase of 2,109 (+7.4%) from the 2010 census combined count of 28,572. In the 2000 census, the two communities had a total population of 30,230, with 14,204 residents in the borough and 16,027 in the township.

Princeton was founded before the American Revolutionary War. The borough is the home of Princeton University, one of the world's most acclaimed research universities, which bears its name and moved to the community in 1756 from the educational institution's previous location in Newark. Although its association with the university is primarily what makes Princeton a college town, other important institutions in the area include the Institute for Advanced Study, Princeton Plasma Physics Laboratory, Princeton Theological Seminary, Opinion Research Corporation, Bristol-Myers Squibb, Siemens Corporate Research, SRI International, FMC Corporation, Educational Testing Service, the Robert Wood Johnson Foundation, Amrep, Church and Dwight, Berlitz International, and Dow Jones & Company.

Princeton is roughly equidistant from New York City and Philadelphia. It is close to many major highways that serve both cities (e.g., Interstate 95 and U.S. Route 1), and receives major television and radio broadcasts from each. It is also close to Trenton, New Jersey's capital city, New Brunswick and Edison.

The New Jersey governor's official residence has been in Princeton since 1945, when Morven (in what was then Princeton Borough) became the first governor's mansion. In 1982, it was replaced by the larger Drumthwacket, a colonial mansion located in the former township, but not all have actually lived in these houses. Morven became a museum and garden, owned and operated by the New Jersey Historical Society.

Throughout much of its history, the community was split into two separate municipalities: a township and borough. The central borough was completely surrounded by the township. The borough seceded from the township in 1894 in a dispute over school taxes; the two municipalities later formed Princeton Public Schools, and some other public services were conducted together before they were reunited into a single Princeton in January 2013. Princeton Borough contained Nassau Street, the main commercial street, most of the university campus, and incorporated most of the urban area until the postwar suburbanization. The borough and township had roughly equal populations. Other major streets include Harrison, Witherspoon, Bayard, Washington, and Stockton.

== History ==
=== Early history ===
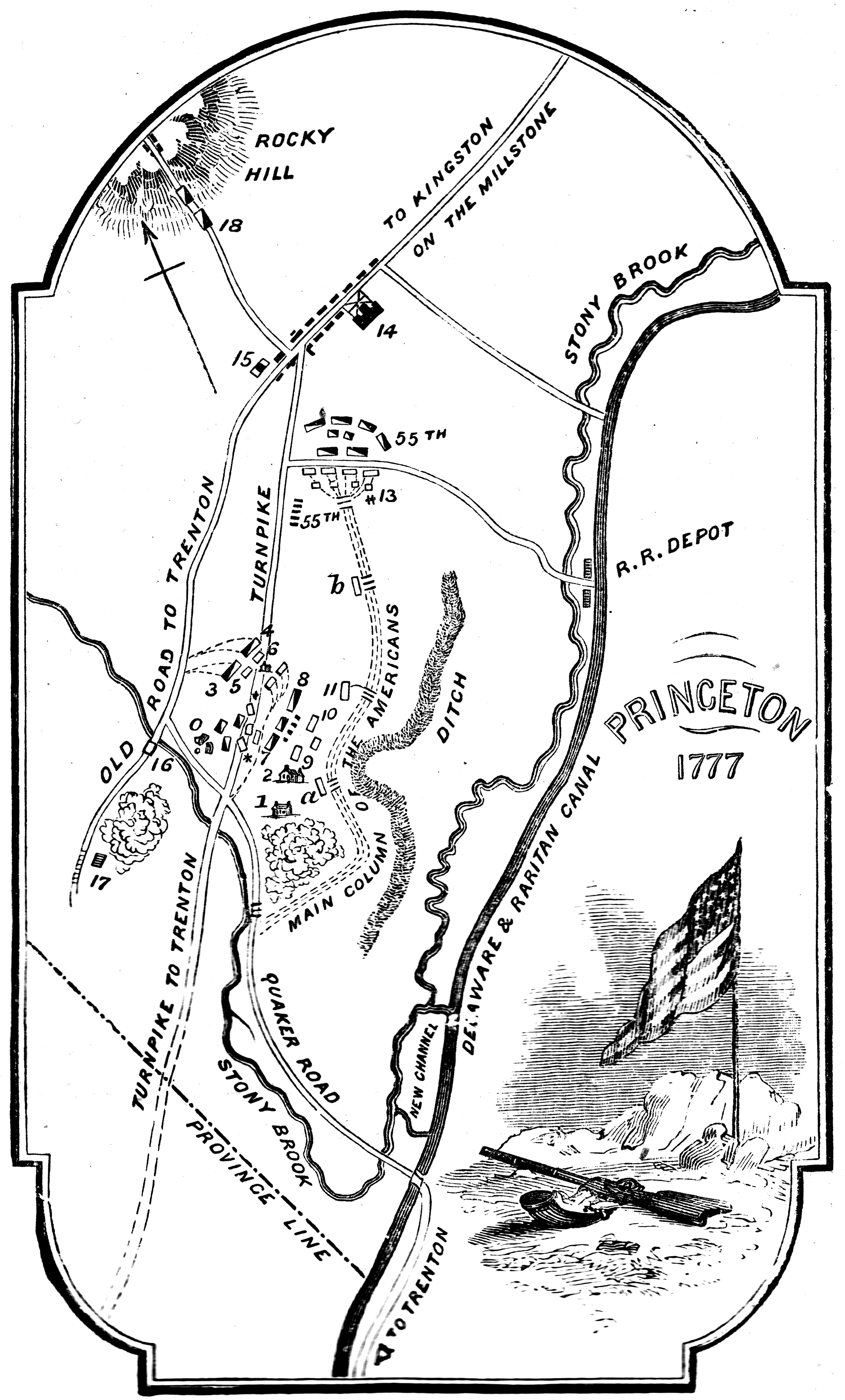
A battlefield map for the Battle of Princeton, 1777

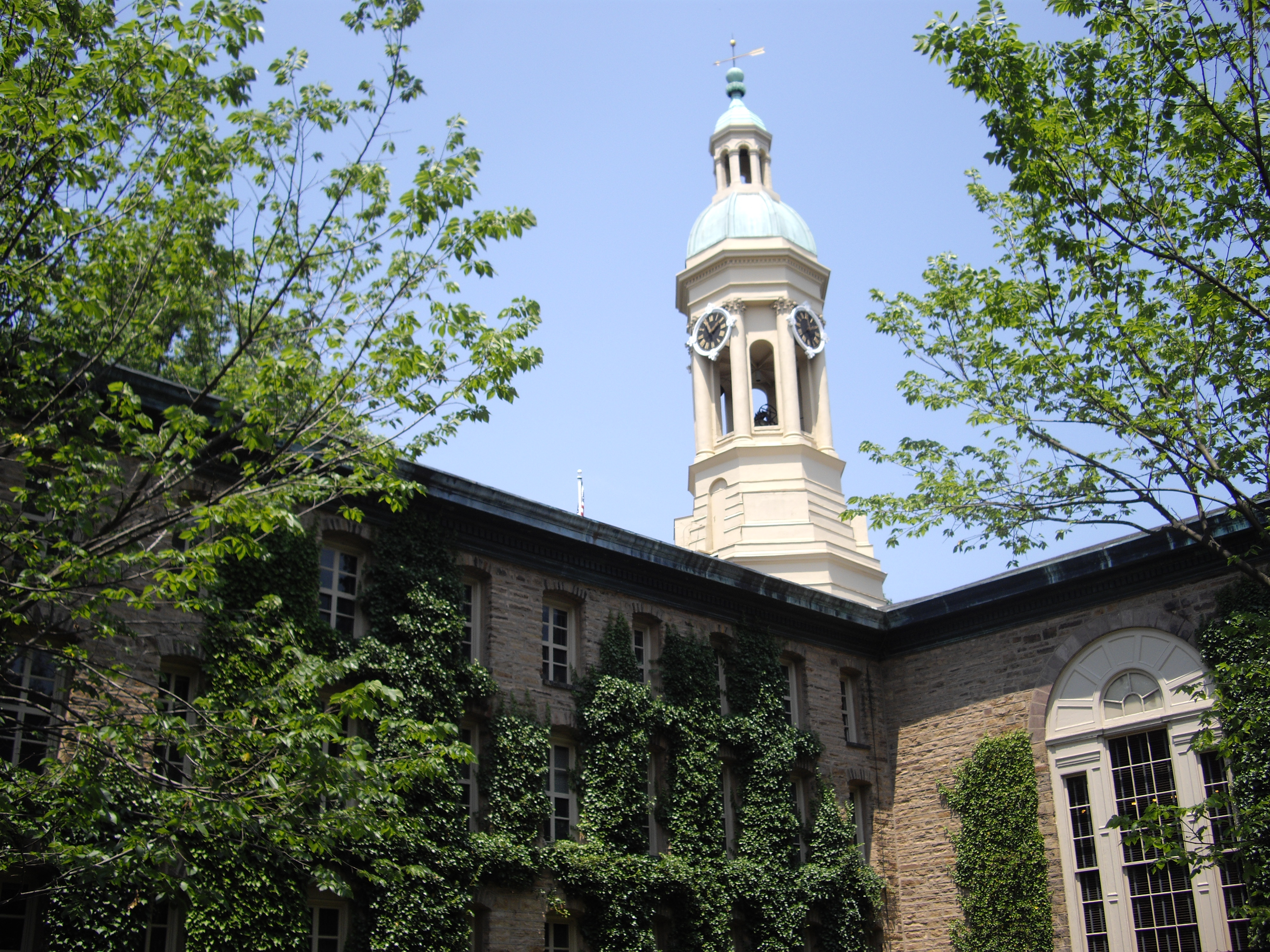
Nassau Hall, which briefly served as the U.S. capitol in 1783

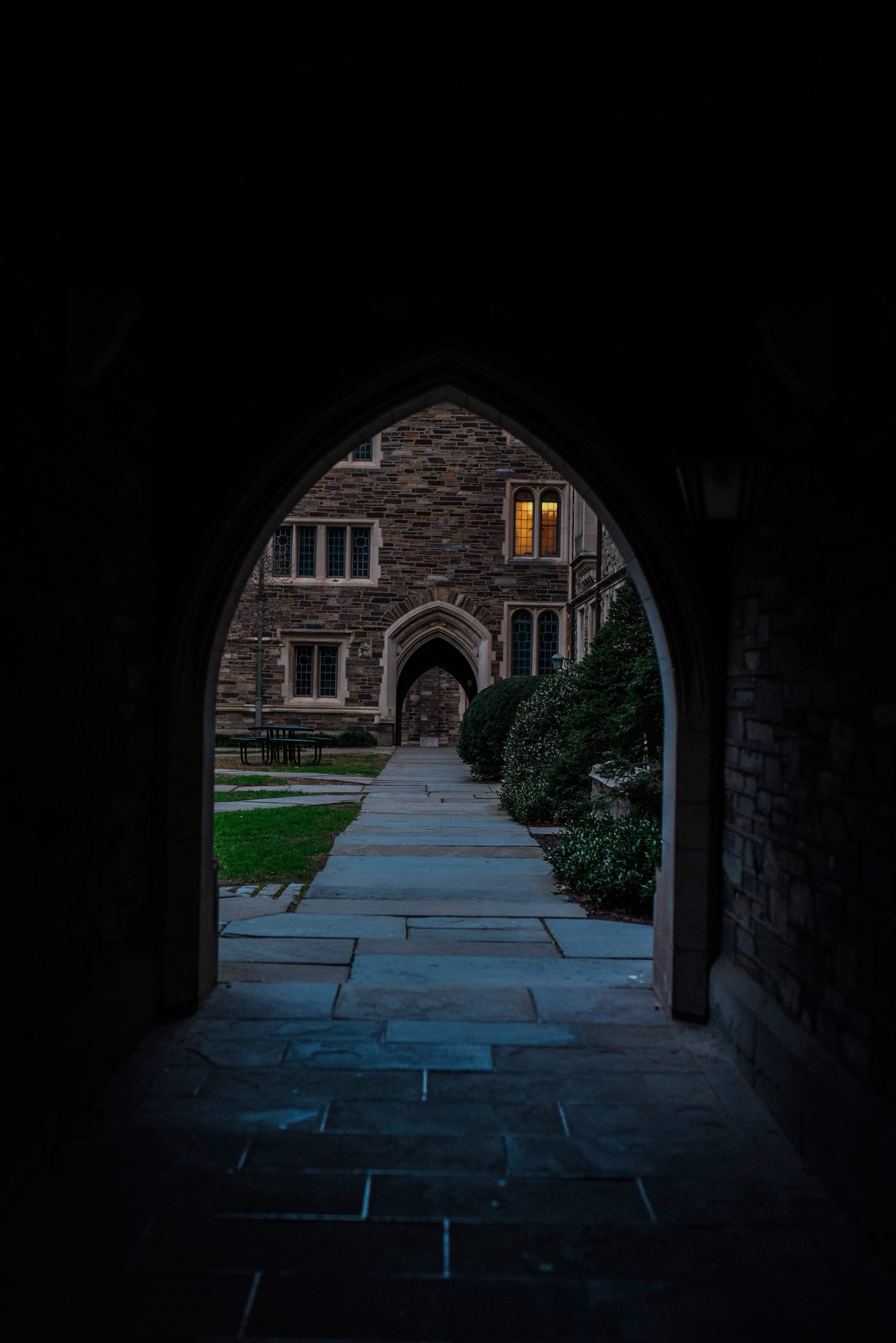
Princeton University's campus, December 2016

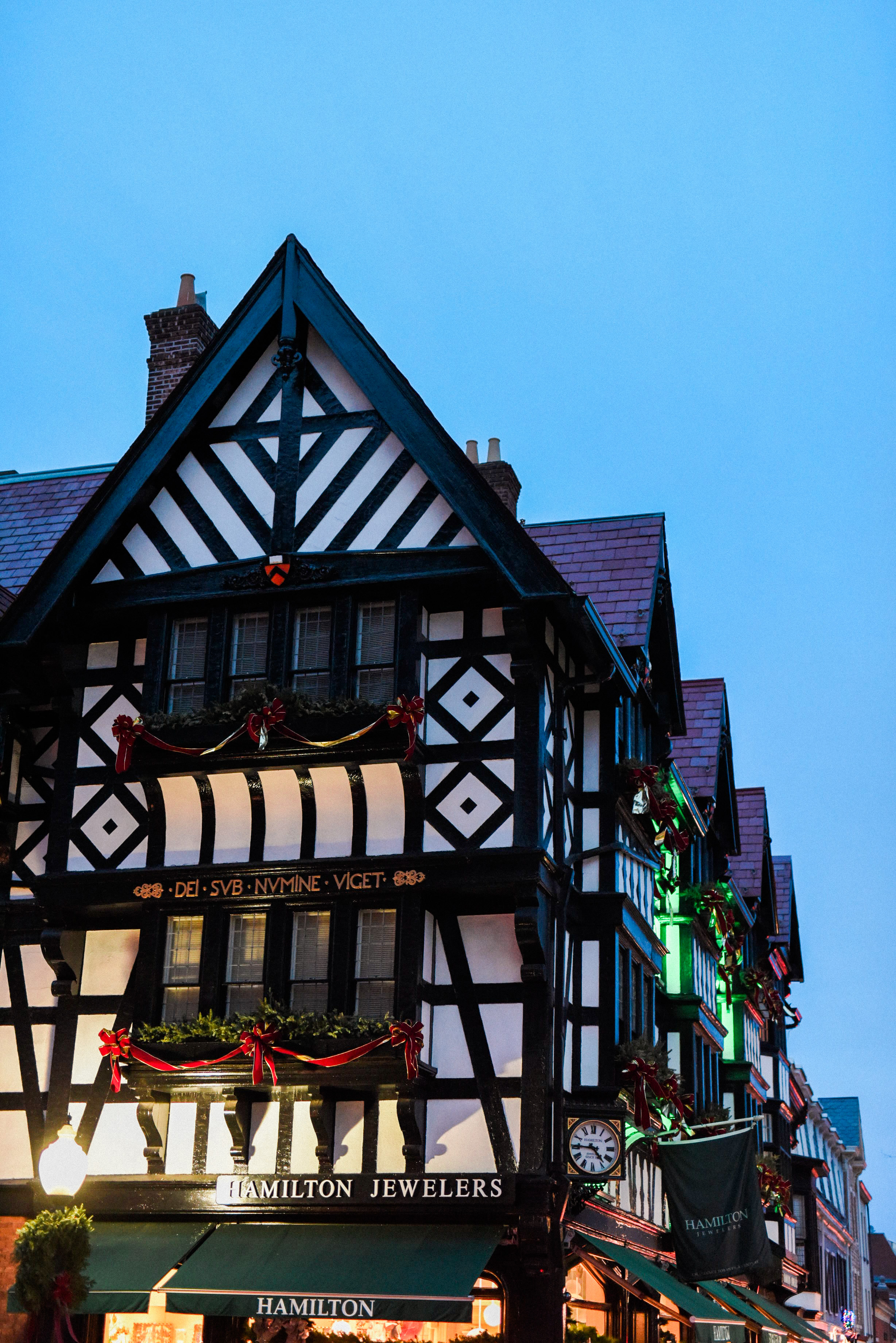
Nassau Street at night, 2016

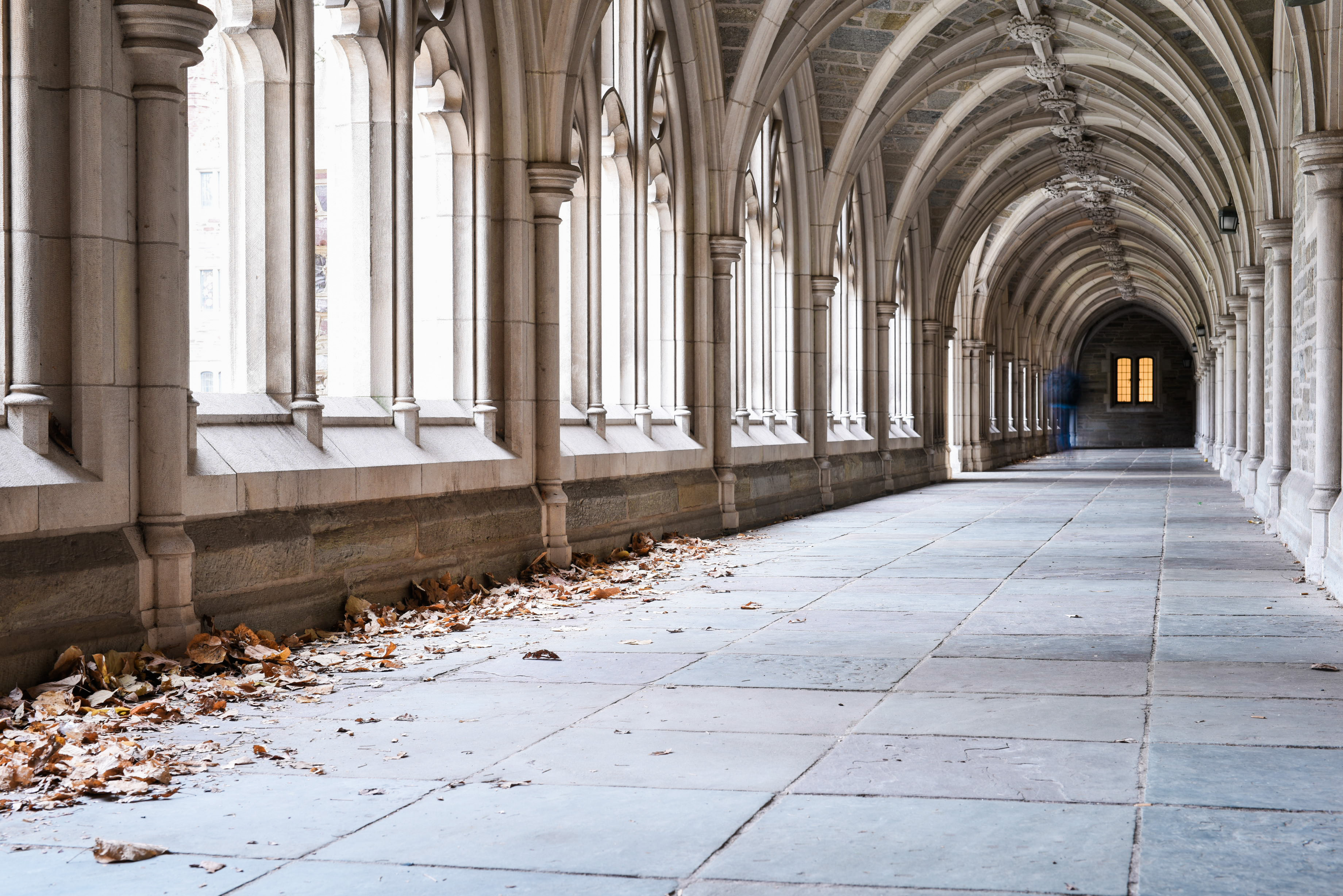
Princeton University's campus was used as one of the sets for the 2004 film Harold & Kumar Go to White Castle.

The Lenape Native Americans were the earliest identifiable inhabitants of the Princeton area.

Europeans settled into the area in the late part of the 17th century, arriving from Delaware to settle West Jersey, and from New York to settle East Jersey, with the site destined to become Princeton being amid the wilderness between these two boroughs. The first European to find his home in the boundaries of the future municipality was Henry Greenland. He built his house in 1683 along with a tavern, where representatives of West and East Jersey met to set the boundaries between the two provinces. Greenland's son-in-law Daniel Brimson inhabited the area by 1690, and left property in a will dated 1696.

Then, Princeton was known only as part of nearby Stony Brook. Nathaniel Fitz Randolph, a native of the town, attested in his private journal on December 28, 1758, that Princeton was named in 1724 upon the making/construction of the first house in the area by James Leonard, who first referred to the community as Princetown when describing the location of his large estate in his diary. The community was later known by a variety of names, including: Princetown, Prince's Town and finally Princeton. The name Princeton was first used in 1724 and became common within the subsequent decade. Although there is no official documentary backing, the municipality is said to be named after Prince William of Orange. Another theory suggests that the name came from a large land-owner named Henry Prince, the son-in-law of a well-known English merchant, but no evidence backs this contention. A royal prince seems a more likely eponym for the settlement, as three nearby towns had names for royalty: Kingston, Queenstown (in the vicinity of the intersection of Nassau and Harrison Streets) and Princessville (Lawrence Township).

Princeton was described by William Edward Schenck in 1850 as having attained "no very considerable size" until the establishment of the College of New Jersey in the town. When Richard Stockton, one of the founders of the township, died in 1709 he left his estate to his sons, who helped to expand property and the population. Based on the 1880 United States census, the population of Princeton comprised 3,209 persons (not including students). Local population has expanded from the nineteenth century. According to the 2010 census, Princeton Borough had 12,307 inhabitants, while Princeton Township had 16,265. The numbers have become stagnant; since the arrival of the College of New Jersey, now Princeton University, in 1756, the town's population spikes every year during the fall and winter, and drops significantly over the course of the summer.

=== Revolution ===
In the pivotal Battle of Princeton in January 1777, George Washington forced the British to evacuate southern New Jersey. After the victory, Princeton hosted the first Legislature under the State Constitution to decide the State's seal, governor and organization of its government. In addition, two of the original signers of the Declaration of Independence—Richard Stockton and John Witherspoon—lived in Princeton. Princetonians honored their citizens' legacy by naming two streets in the downtown area after them.

Note: The ghosts of Hessian soldiers are occasionally said to haunt the Princeton battlefield. These sightings are most common near the Mass Grave, a stone patio located directly behind the park's Ionic Colonnade. This site serves as the common grave for 21 British and 15 American soldiers killed during the battle

Princeton is located in Mercer County, named after General Hugh Mercer—a close friend and confidant of George Washington. Mercer was mortally wounded during the Battle of Princeton on January 3, 1777. The tree he rested under after the battle became known as the Mercer Oak; it stood on the battlefield for over two centuries until it finally collapsed in 2000

On January 10, 1938, Henry Ewing Hale called for a group of citizens to establish a "Historical Society of Princeton". Later the Bainbridge House, constructed in 1766 by Job Stockton, would be dedicated for this purpose. Previously the house was used once for a meeting of Continental Congress in 1783, a general office, and as the Princeton Public Library. The House is owned by Princeton University and is leased to the Princeton Historical Society for one dollar per year. The house has kept its original staircase, flooring and paneled walls. Around 70% of the house has been unaltered. Aside from safety features such as wheelchair access and electrical work, the house has been restored to its original appearance and character.

=== Government history ===
During the most stirring events in its history, Princeton was a wide spot in the road; the boundary between Somerset County and Middlesex County ran right through Princeton, along the high road between New York and Philadelphia, now Nassau Street. When Mercer County was formed in 1838, part of West Windsor was added to the portion of Montgomery Township which was included in the new county, and made into Princeton Township; the area between the southern boundary of the former Borough and the Delaware and Raritan Canal was added to Princeton Township in 1853. Princeton Borough became a separate municipality in 1894.

In the early nineteenth century, New Jersey boroughs had been quasi-independent subdivisions chartered within existing townships that did not have full autonomy. Princeton Borough received such a charter in 1813, as part of Montgomery and West Windsor Townships; it continued to be part of Princeton Township until the Borough Act of 1894, which required each township to form a single school district; rather than do so, Princeton Borough petitioned to be separated. (The two Princetons combined their public school systems in the decades before municipal consolidation.) Two minor boundary changes united the then site of the Princeton Hospital and of the Princeton Regional High School inside the Borough, in 1928 and 1951 respectively. See the section on "Merger of borough and township" for more details about the 2011 merger of borough and the 2013 incorporation as a municipality.

== Geography ==
Aerial view of downtown Princeton along Nassau Street (right) and the Princeton University campus (left), looking southwest, December 2025

Princeton is located just south of a long, curving ridge known as Princeton Ridge. As Princeton is in a low-lying area, there have been issues with cell phone signals. According to the U.S. Census Bureau, Princeton had a total area of 18.41 square miles (47.69 km^{2}), including 17.95 square miles (46.48 km^{2}) of land and 0.47 square miles (1.21 km^{2}) of water (2.53%).

Cedar Grove, Port Mercer, Princeton Basin, and Jugtown are unincorporated communities that have been absorbed into Greater Princeton over the years, but still maintain their own community identities.

Princeton borders the municipalities of Hopewell Township, Lawrence Township, and West Windsor in Mercer County, Plainsboro Township and South Brunswick Township in Middlesex County, and Franklin Township and Montgomery Township in Somerset County.

ZIP codes for Princeton include 08540, 08541 (Educational Testing Service), 08542 (largely the old Borough), 08543 (PO boxes), and 08544 (the University).

== Demographics ==
Historical population
| Census | Pop. | Note | %± |
|---|---|---|---|
| 2010 | 28,572 | | — |
| 2020 | 30,681 | | 7.4% |
| 2023 (est.) | 30,289 | | −1.3% |
Population sources: 2010-2020

=== 2020 census ===
According to the website Data USA, Princeton has a population of 30,168 people, of which 85% are U.S. citizens. The ethnic composition of the population is 20,393 White residents (67.6%), 4,636 Asian residents (15.4%), 2,533 Hispanic residents (8.4%), 1,819 Black residents (6.03%), and 618 residents of two or more races (2.05%).

The most common foreign languages are Chinese (1,800 speakers), Spanish (1,429 speakers), and French (618 speakers), but compared to other places, Princeton has a relatively high number of speakers of Scandinavian languages (425 speakers), Italian (465 speakers), and German (1,000 speakers). https://datausa.io/profile/geo/mercer-county-north-princeton-borough-puma-nj

According to the 2020 census, Princeton had a median household price just over $860,000.

=== 2010 census ===
As of the 2010 United States census, the borough and township had a combined population of 28,572.

== Government ==
=== Local government ===
Princeton is governed under the borough form of New Jersey municipal government, which is used in 218 municipalities (of the 564) statewide, making it the most common form of government in New Jersey. The governing body is comprised of the mayor and the borough council, with all positions elected at-large on a partisan basis as part of the November general election. The mayor is elected directly by the voters to a four-year term of office. The borough council includes six members elected to serve three-year terms on a staggered basis, with two seats coming up for election each year in a three-year cycle. The borough form of government used by Princeton is a "weak mayor / strong council" government in which council members act as the legislative body with the mayor presiding at meetings and voting only in the event of a tie. The mayor can veto ordinances subject to an override by a two-thirds majority vote of the council. The mayor makes committee and liaison assignments for council members, and most appointments are made by the mayor with the advice and consent of the council.

The mayor is elected directly by the voters to a four-year term of office, serves as Princeton's chief executive officer and nominates appointees to various boards and commissions subject to approval of the council. The mayor presides at council meetings and votes in the case of a tie or a few other specific cases. The council consists of six members elected to serve three-year terms on a staggered basis, with two seats coming up for election each year in a three-year cycle. The council has administrative powers and is the policy-making body for Princeton. The council approves appointments made by the mayor. Council members serve on various boards and committees and act as liaisons to certain departments, committees or boards.

As of 2025, the mayor of Princeton is Democrat Mark Freda, who is serving a four-year term expiring on December 31, 2028. Members of the Princeton Council are Council President Mia Sacks (D, 2026), David F. Cohen (D, 2027), Leticia Fraga (D, 2027), Michelle Pirone Lambros (D, 2026), Leighton Newlin (D, 2027) and Brian McDonald (D, 2027).

In 2018, Princeton had an average property tax bill of $19,388, the highest in the county, compared to an average bill of $8,767 statewide.

==== Merger of borough and township ====
People in the township tried unsuccessfully to merge borough and township in a struggle that lasted nearly fifty years. The first failed attempt to consolidate borough and township was made in 1953, with 63% of township voters in favor of a merger and 57% of borough voters opposed. Subsequent attempts were voted down by borough residents, in large part due to different zoning needs of the densely populated borough versus the more widely spaced properties of the township (surrounding the borough). An attempt to consolidate in 1979 passed with 70% support in the township but failed in the borough by 33 votes, a result that was upheld after a recount. Although township voters again supported a 1996 merger referendum by an almost 3–1 margin, about 57% of borough voters rejected the consolidation proposal, marking the sixth such failure.

The residents of both the Borough of Princeton and the Township of Princeton voted on November 8, 2011, to merge the two municipalities into one. This was the first referendum when university student voters were encouraged and allowed to register to vote locally, and that likely contributed strongly to the measure passing, as the students were not home owners concerned with zoning matters, and they all counted as part of the borough and not the township. In Princeton Borough, 1,385 voted for, and 902 voted against, while in Princeton Township, 3,542 voted for, and 604 voted against. Proponents of the merger asserted that when the merger is completed the new Municipality of Princeton would save $3.2 million as a result of some scaled down services including layoffs of 15 government workers including 9 police officers (however the measure itself does not mandate such layoffs). Opponents of the measure challenged the findings of a report citing cost savings as unsubstantiated, expressed concerns about differing zoning needs between the borough and township, and noted that voter representation would be reduced in a smaller government structure. The merger was the first in the state since 1997, when Pahaquarry Township voted to consolidate with Hardwick Township. The consolidation took effect on January 1, 2013.

Former mayor Chad Goerner, wrote a book (A Tale of Two Tigers: Princeton’s Historic Consolidation) discussing the policy, process and political complexities of getting the borough and the township finally merged

As of 2025 the town is finally looking into a complete zoning overhaul. The town government is looking into allowing reduced parking requirements, and more "grandmother" apartments, among other changes.

=== Federal, state and county representation ===
Princeton is located in the 12th Congressional District and is part of New Jersey's 16th state legislative district.

For the 119th United States Congress, New Jersey's 12th congressional district is represented by Bonnie Watson Coleman (D, Ewing Township). New Jersey is represented in the United States Senate by Democrats Cory Booker (Newark, term ends 2027) and Andy Kim (Moorestown, term ends 2031).

For the 2026–2027 session, the 16th legislative district of the New Jersey Legislature is represented in the New Jersey Senate by Andrew Zwicker (D, South Brunswick) and in the General Assembly by Mitchelle Drulis (D, East Amwell Township) and Roy Freiman (D, Hillsborough Township).

Mercer County is governed by a County Executive who oversees the day-to-day operations of the county and by a seven-member Board of County Commissioners that acts in a legislative capacity, setting policy. All officials are chosen at-large in partisan elections, with the executive serving a four-year term of office while the commissioners serve three-year terms of office on a staggered basis, with either two or three seats up for election each year as part of the November general election. As of 2025, the County Executive is Daniel R. Benson (D, Hamilton Township) whose term of office ends December 31, 2027. Mercer County's Commissioners are:

Lucylle R. S. Walter (D, Ewing Township, 2026), Chair John A. Cimino (D, Hamilton Township, 2026), Samuel T. Frisby Sr. (D, Trenton, 2027), Cathleen M. Lewis (D, Lawrence Township, 2025), Vice Chair Kristin L. McLaughlin (D, Hopewell Township, 2027), Nina D. Melker (D, Hamilton Township, 2025) and Terrance Stokes (D, Ewing Township, 2027).

Mercer County's constitutional officers are: Clerk Paula Sollami-Covello (D, Lawrence Township, 2025), Sheriff John A. Kemler (D, Hamilton Township, 2026) and Surrogate Diane Gerofsky (D, Lawrence Township, 2026).

=== Politics ===
As of March 2011, there were a total of 18,049 registered voters in Princeton (a sum of the former borough and township's voters), of which 9,184 (50.9%) were registered as Democrats, 2,140 (11.9%) were registered as Republicans and 6,703 (37.1%) were registered as unaffiliated. There were 22 voters registered as Libertarians or Greens.

United States presidential election results for Princeton
| Year | Republican | | Democratic | | Third party(ies) | |
| Year | No. | % | No. | % | No. | % |
|---|---|---|---|---|---|---|
| 2024 | 2,029 | 15.98% | 10,292 | 81.08% | 373 | 2.94% |
| 2020 | 1,981 | 14.08% | 11,858 | 84.25% | 235 | 1.67% |
| 2016 | 1,817 | 14.09% | 10,548 | 81.82% | 527 | 4.09% |
| 2012 | 2,882 | 22.97% | 9,461 | 75.40% | 205 | 1.63% |

In the 2016, 2020, and 2024 presidential elections, the Democratic nominee received over 80% of the vote. Since at least 2012, that year's and the 2024 presidential election were the only elections in which the Republican nominee earned over 15% of the vote in the borough. In the 2012 presidential election, Democrat Barack Obama received 75.4% of the vote (9,461 cast), ahead of Republican Mitt Romney with 23.0% (2,882 votes), and other candidates with 1.6% (205 votes), among the 14,752 ballots cast by the municipality's 20,328 registered voters (2,204 ballots were spoiled), for a turnout of 72.6%.

Gubernatorial election results for Princeton
| Year | Republican | | Democratic | | Third party(ies) | |
| Year | No. | % | No. | % | No. | % |
|---|---|---|---|---|---|---|
| 2025 | 1,784 | 16.98% | 8,673 | 82.55% | 49 | 0.47% |
| 2021 | 1,553 | 18.59% | 6,721 | 80.46% | 79 | 0.95% |
| 2017 | 1,491 | 17.95% | 6,648 | 80.02% | 169 | 2.03% |
| 2013 | 2,780 | 39.17% | 4,172 | 58.79% | 145 | 2.04% |

In the 2013 gubernatorial election, Democrat Barbara Buono received 58.8% of the vote (4,172 cast), ahead of Republican Chris Christie with 39.2% (2,780 votes), and other candidates with 2.0% (145 votes), among the 7,279 ballots cast by the municipality's 18,374 registered voters (182 ballots were spoiled), for a turnout of 39.6%.

United States Senate election results for Princeton1
| Year | Republican | | Democratic | | Third party(ies) | |
| Year | No. | % | No. | % | No. | % |
|---|---|---|---|---|---|---|
| 2024 | 2,155 | 17.22% | 10,100 | 80.72% | 258 | 2.06% |
| 2018 | 1,795 | 20.50% | 6,721 | 76.77% | 239 | 2.73% |
| 2012 | 2,856 | 23.70% | 8,940 | 74.18% | 256 | 2.12% |

United States Senate election results for Princeton2
| Year | Republican | | Democratic | | Third party(ies) | |
| Year | No. | % | No. | % | No. | % |
|---|---|---|---|---|---|---|
| 2020 | 2,447 | 17.54% | 11,325 | 81.17% | 180 | 1.29% |
| 2014 | 1,400 | 19.61% | 5,635 | 78.93% | 104 | 1.46% |
| 2013 | 1,020 | 17.57% | 4,744 | 81.74% | 40 | 0.69% |

== Education ==
=== Colleges and universities ===
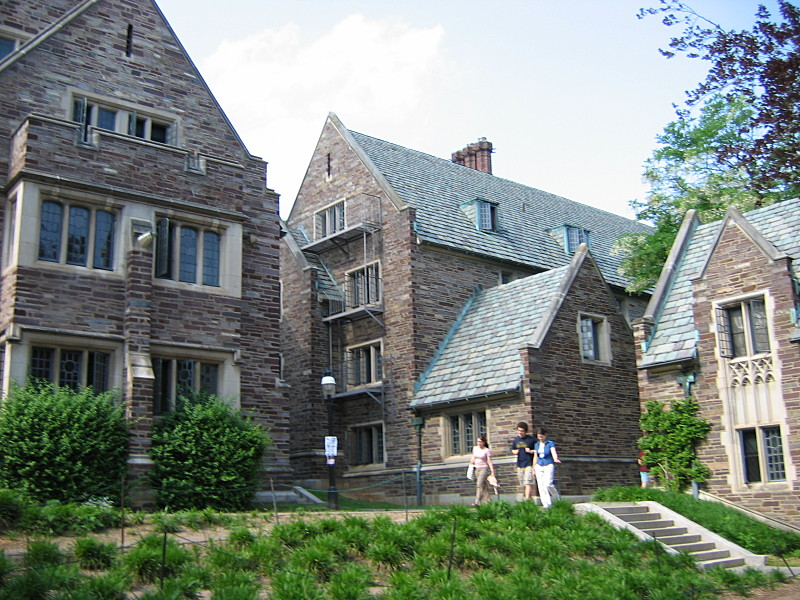
Princeton University's Cuyler and Walker Halls are dormitories with Collegiate Gothic architecture.

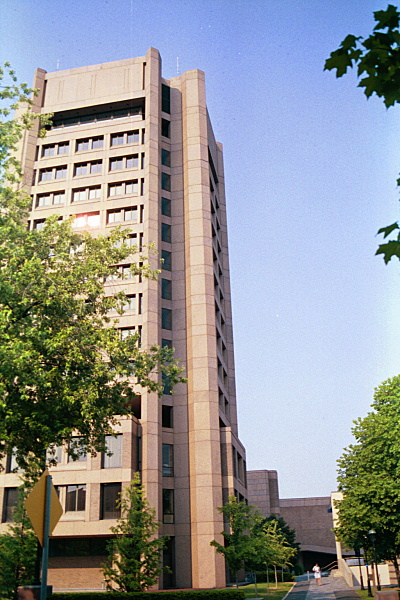
Princeton University's Fine Hall, home of its Department of Mathematics

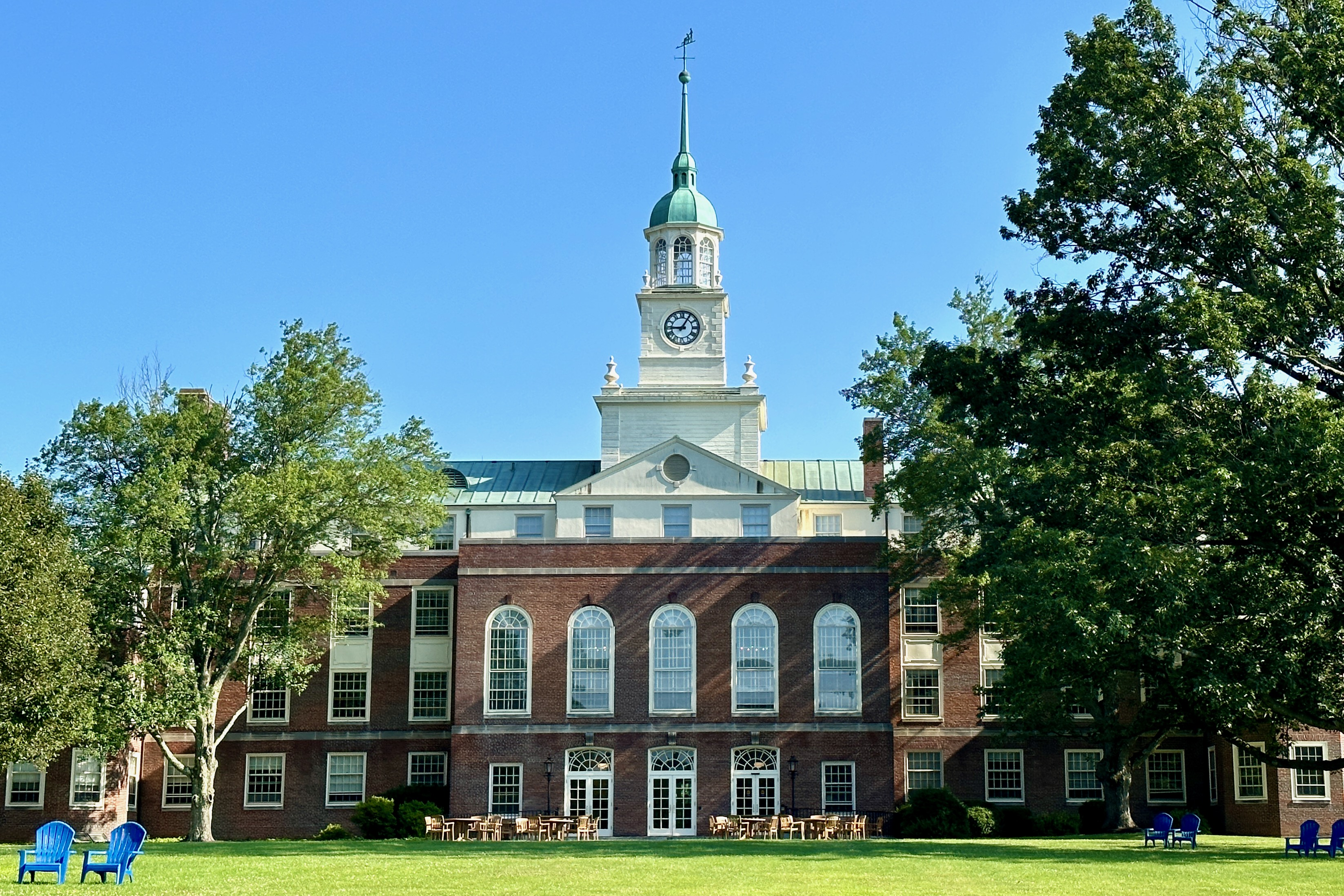
Fuld Hall, home of the Institute for Advanced Study

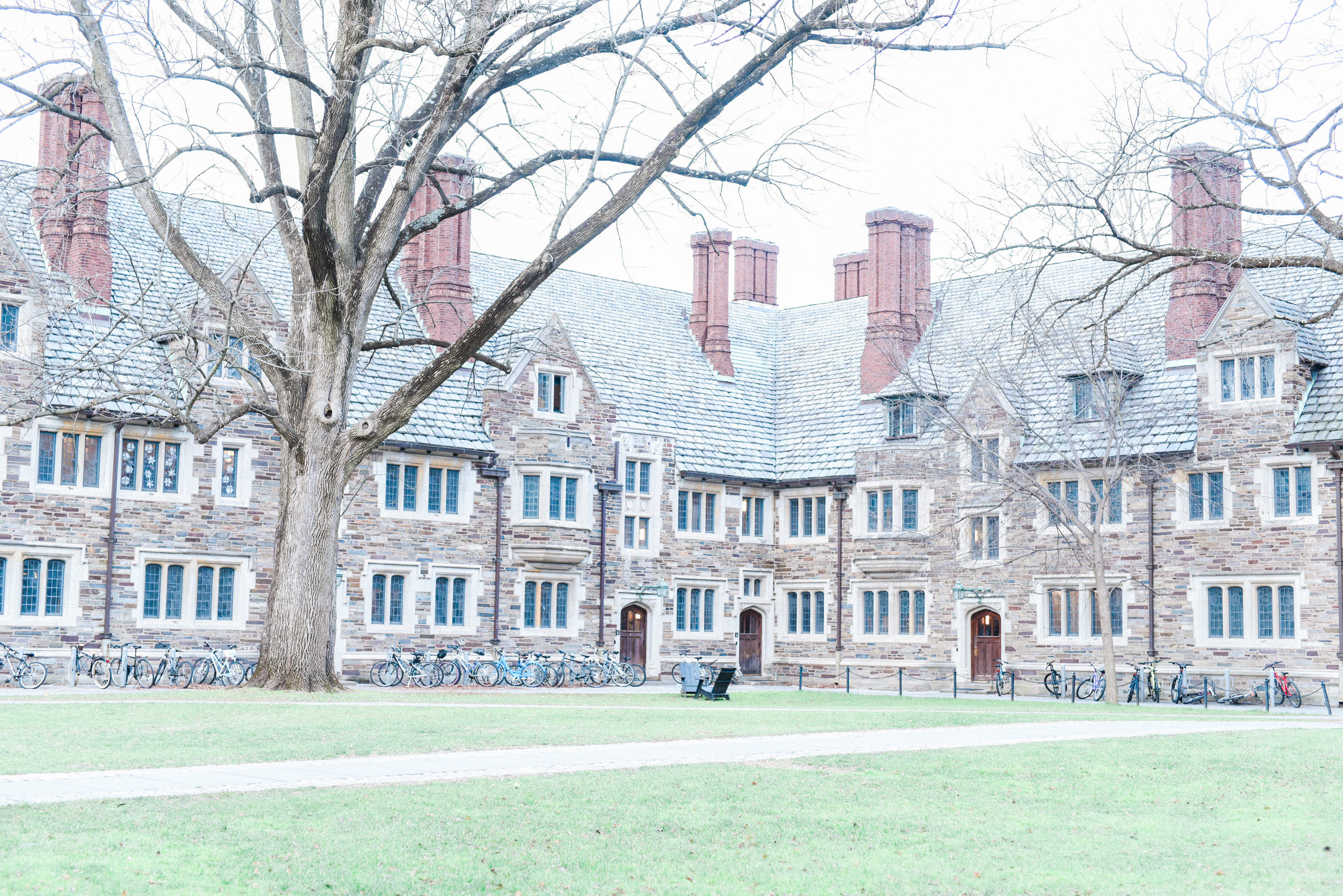
Princeton University's campus. The university is one of eight Ivy League universities and once had Albert Einstein as a lecturer.

Princeton University, one of the world's most prominent research universities, is a dominant feature of the community. Established in 1746 as the College of New Jersey and relocated to Princeton ten years later, Princeton University's main campus has its historic center on Nassau Street and stretches south from there. Its James Forrestal satellite campus is located in Plainsboro Township, and some playing fields lie within adjacent West Windsor. Princeton University was featured at the top of U.S. News & World Report's national university rankings for the ninth consecutive year in 2024, as well as topping comparable lists by Forbes and The Wall Street Journal.

Princeton Theological Seminary, the first and oldest seminary in America of the Presbyterian Church (USA), has its main academic campus in Princeton, with residential housing located just outside of Princeton in West Windsor Township.

The Institute for Advanced Study maintains extensive land holdings (the "Institute Woods") there covering 800 acres (320 ha).

Mercer County Community College, not actually in Princeton, but in nearby West Windsor, is a two-year public college serving Princeton residents and all those from Mercer County.

Westminster Choir College, a school of music owned by Rider University since 1992, was established on a large campus in Princeton in 1932. Before relocating to Princeton, the school resided in Dayton, Ohio, and then briefly in Ithaca, New York. In 2012, Rider proposed a parking lot expansion on the Princeton campus that required cutting old-growth trees and was strenuously opposed by neighbors. In 2019, Rider (which is located in Lawrence Township) attempted to sell the choir college campus in Princeton to a Chinese company, resulting in a public outcry and the prevention of that sale. In 2020, Rider moved all activities of Westminster Choir College from Princeton to its Lawrenceville campus; the Princeton campus is now largely unused while legal wrangling continues about the future of the campus and its academic programs. As of 2023, Princeton is paying Rider $1,000 per month to lease overflow parking at the Choir College; the town then sells the parking rights for $30 per month to businesses, residents and non-residents. The Choir College parking is a few blocks' walk from downtown.

=== Primary and secondary schools ===
==== Public schools ====
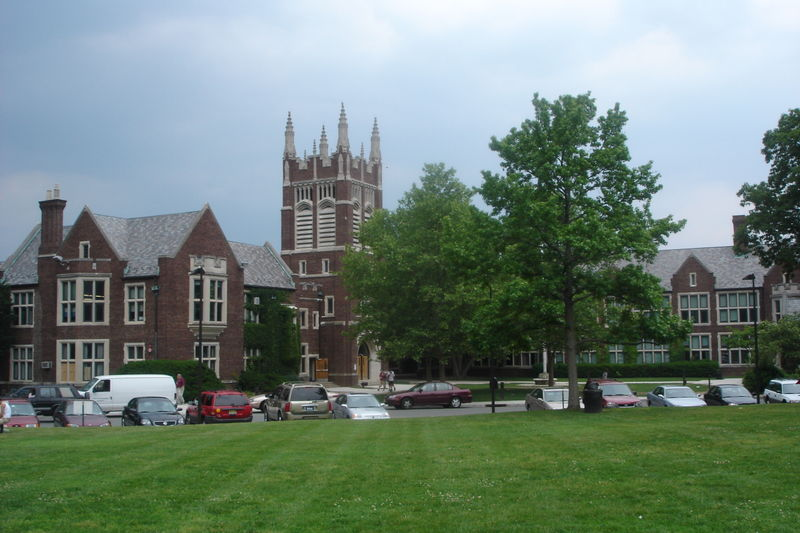
Princeton High School

The Princeton Public Schools serve students in pre-kindergarten through twelfth grade. Students from Cranbury Township attend the district's high school as part of a sending/receiving relationship. As of the 2020–21 school year, the district, comprised of six schools, had an enrollment of 3,740 students and 341.0 classroom teachers (on an FTE basis), for a student–teacher ratio of 11.0:1. Schools in the district (with 2020–21 enrollment data from the National Center for Education Statistics) are Community Park School with 332 students in grades K-5, Johnson Park School with 329 students in grades PreK-5, Littlebrook School with 342 students in grades K-5, Riverside School with 289 students in grades PreK-5, Princeton Middle School,(Which was orignianlly called John Witherspoon Middle School). with 803 students in grades 6-8 and Princeton High School with 1,555 students in grades 9–12.

Like many public school districts across New Jersey, Princeton Public Schools has faced ongoing budget deficits driven by state funding constraints, rising transportation expenses, and escalating healthcare and insurance costs. Local Board of Education member Adam Bierman has discussed these challenges in the context of the district's finances, emphasizing the need for careful spending and difficult decisions about which programs and expenditures should be prioritized.

New Jersey Monthly magazine ranked Princeton High School as the 20th best high school in New Jersey in its 2018 rankings of the "Top Public High Schools" in New Jersey. The school was also ranked as the 33rd best school in New Jersey by U.S. News & World Report in 2024. Niche ranked Princeton High School as the 147th best public high school in America in its "2025 Best Public High Schools in America" rankings.

In the early 1990s, redistricting occurred between the Community Park and Johnson Park School districts, as the population within both districts had increased due to residential development. Concerns were also raised about the largely white, wealthy student population attending Johnson Park (JP) and the more racially and economically diverse population at Community Park (CP). As a result of the redistricting, portions of the affluent Western Section neighborhood were redistricted to CP, and portions of the racially and economically diverse John Witherspoon neighborhood were redistricted to JP.

The Princeton Charter School (grades K–8) operates under a charter granted by the commissioner of the New Jersey Department of Education. The school is a public school that operates independently of the Princeton Regional Schools, and is funded on a per student basis by locally raised tax revenues.

Eighth grade students from all of Mercer County are eligible to apply to attend the high school programs offered by the Mercer County Technical Schools, a county-wide vocational school district that offers full-time career and technical education at its Health Sciences Academy, STEM Academy and Academy of Culinary Arts, with no tuition charged to students for attendance.

==== Private schools ====
Private schools located in Princeton include The Lewis School of Princeton, Princeton Day School, Princeton Friends School, Hun School of Princeton, and Princeton International School of Mathematics and Science (PRISMS).

St. Paul's Catholic School (pre-school to 8th grade) founded in 1878, is the oldest and only coeducational Catholic school, joining Princeton Academy of the Sacred Heart (K–8, all male) and Stuart Country Day School of the Sacred Heart (coed for Pre-K, and all-female K–12), which operate under the supervision of the Roman Catholic Diocese of Trenton.

Schools that are outside of Princeton but have Princeton addresses include the Wilberforce School, Chapin School in Lawrence Township, Princeton Junior School in Lawrence Township, the French-American School of Princeton, the Laurel School of Princeton, the Waldorf School of Princeton, YingHua International School, Princeton Latin Academy in Hopewell, Princeton Montessori School in Montgomery Township, Eden Institute in West Windsor, and the now-defunct American Boychoir School in Plainsboro Township.

=== Public libraries ===
The Princeton Public Library's current facility on Witherspoon Street was opened in April 2004 as part of the ongoing downtown redevelopment project and replaced a building dating from 1966. The library itself was founded in 1909.

=== Miscellaneous education ===
The Princeton Community Japanese Language School teaches weekend Japanese classes for Japanese citizen children abroad to the standard of the Ministry of Education, Culture, Sports, Science and Technology (MEXT), and it also has classes for people with Japanese as a second language. The main office of the school is in Princeton although the office used on Sundays is in Memorial Hall at Rider University in Lawrence Township in Mercer County. Courses are taught at Memorial Hall at Rider University.

The Princeton Learning Cooperative provides support for student-directed learning as "a hybrid of homeschooling and school" for teens.

== Infrastructure ==
=== Transportation ===
==== Roads and highways ====
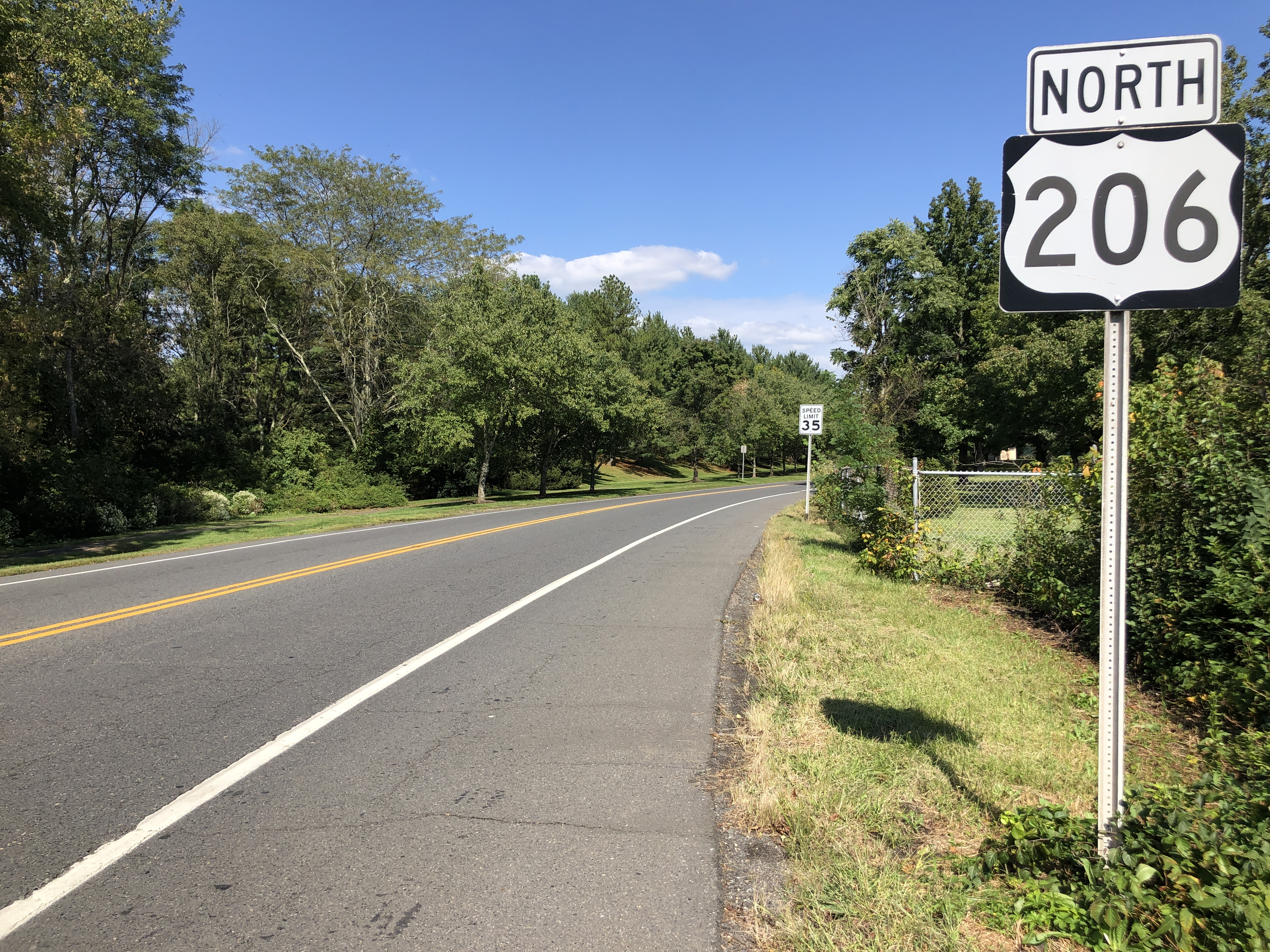
U.S. Route 206 in Princeton

As of May 2010, the borough had a total of 126.95 miles (204.31 km) of roadways, of which 118.36 miles (190.48 km) were maintained by the municipality, 3.93 miles (6.32 km) by Mercer County, and 8.66 miles (13.94 km) by the New Jersey Department of Transportation.

Several major roads pass through Princeton. U.S. Route 206 and Route 27 pass through, along with County Routes 583, 526/571 (commonly known as Washington Road) and 533.

Other major roads that are accessible outside the municipality include U.S. Route 1 (in Lawrence Township, West Windsor and South Brunswick), Interstate 287 (in Franklin Township), Interstate 295 (in Lawrence Township), and the New Jersey Turnpike/Interstate 95 (in South Brunswick). The closest Turnpike exits are Interchange 8A in Monroe Township, Interchange 8 in East Windsor, and Interchange 7A in Robbinsville Township.

A number of proposed highways around Princeton have been canceled. The Somerset Freeway (Interstate 95) was to pass just outside the municipality before ending in Hopewell (to the south) and Franklin (to the north). This project was canceled in 1980. Route 92 was supposed to remedy the lack of limited-access highways to the greater Princeton area. The road would have started at Route 1 near Ridge Road in South Brunswick and ended at Exit 8A of the Turnpike. However, that project was cancelled in 2006.

==== Public transportation ====
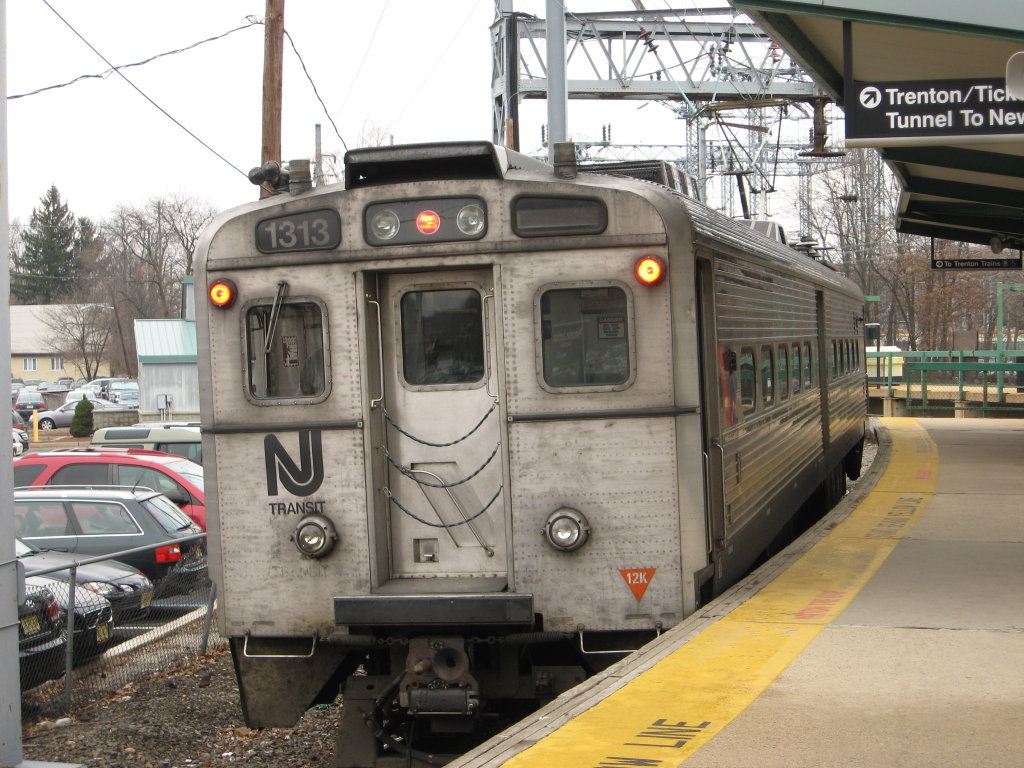
The "Dinky" at the Princeton Branch platform at Princeton Junction

Princeton is roughly equidistant from New York City and Philadelphia. Since the 19th century, Princeton has been connected by rail to both of these cities at the Princeton train station. Service is provided on the Princeton Branch rail line, which runs 2.7 miles (4.3 km) to the nearby Princeton Junction station on Amtrak's Northeast Corridor. The station was moved from under Blair Hall to a more southerly location on University Place in 1918, and was moved further southeast in 2013. Commuting to New York from Princeton became commonplace after the Second World War. While the Amtrak ride time is similar to New York and to Philadelphia, the commuter-train ride to New York—via NJ Transit's Northeast Corridor Line—is generally much faster than the equivalent train ride to Philadelphia, which involves a transfer to SEPTA trains in Trenton. NJ Transit provides shuttle service between the Princeton and Princeton Junction stations synchronized with trains operating on the Northeast Corridor; the train is called the "Dinky", and has also been known as the "PJ&B" (for "Princeton Junction and Back"). Two train cars, or sometimes just one, are used.

NJ Transit provides bus service to Trenton on the 606 route and local service on route 605.

Coach USA Suburban Transit operates frequent daily service to midtown NYC on the 100 route, and weekday rush-hour service to downtown NYC on the 600 route.

Princeton and Princeton University provide the FreeB and Tiger Transit local bus services.

==== Air ====
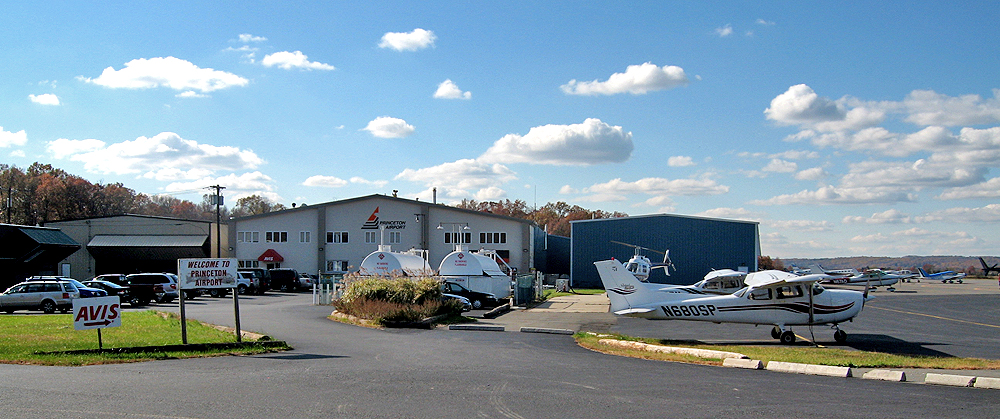
Princeton Airport

Princeton Airport is a public airport located 3 miles (4.8 km) north of Downtown Princeton in Montgomery Township. The private Forrestal Airport was located on Princeton University property, 2 miles (3.2 km) east of the main campus, from the early 1950s through the early 1990s.

The closest commercial airport is Trenton-Mercer Airport in Ewing Township, about 15 miles (24 km) from the center of Princeton, which is served by Frontier Airlines nonstop to and from 17 cities. Other nearby major airports are Newark Liberty International Airport and Philadelphia International Airport, located 39 miles (63 km) and 52 miles (84 km) away, respectively.

=== Healthcare ===
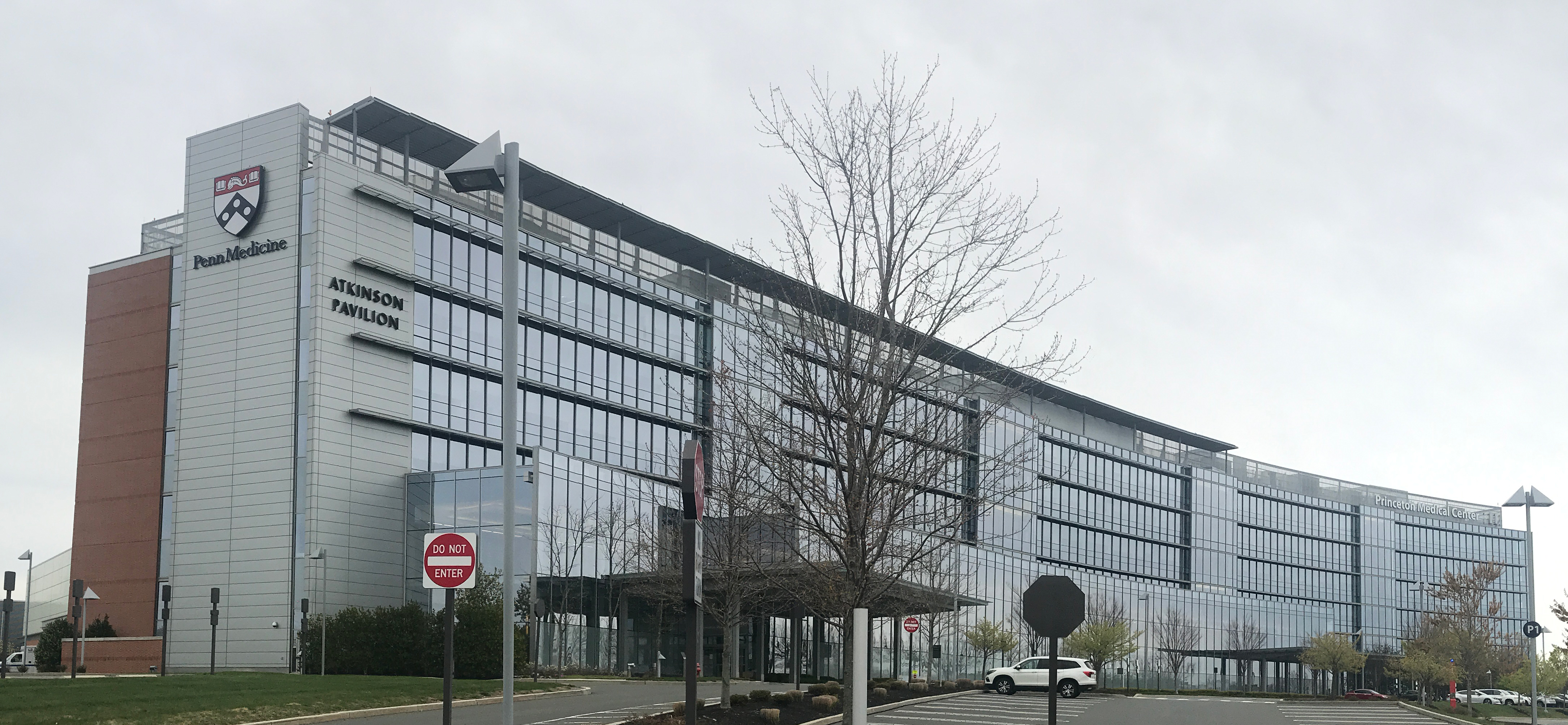
Penn Medicine Princeton Medical Center

Penn Medicine Princeton Medical Center (commonly abbreviated as "PMC") is a regional hospital and healthcare network located in neighboring Plainsboro Township. The hospital serves the greater Princeton region in Central Jersey. It is owned by the Penn Medicine Health System and is the only hospital of such in the state of New Jersey. PMC is a 355-bed non-profit, tertiary, and academic medical center. It is a major university hospital of the Robert Wood Johnson Medical School of Rutgers University and has a helipad to handle transport critical patients from and to other hospitals via PennStar. The hospital was previously located in Princeton on Witherspoon Street until May 2012, when the new location opened off U.S. Route 1 in Plainsboro. The new hospital was designed by a joint venture between HOK and RMJM Hiller.

Other nearby regional hospitals and healthcare networks that are accessible to Princeton include the Hamilton Township division and the New Brunswick division of Robert Wood Johnson University Hospital (RWJUH), along with Saint Peter's University Hospital, also in New Brunswick. Princeton University's Frist Campus Center^{[a]} was used for the aerial views of the fictional Princeton‑Plainsboro Teaching Hospital, as seen in the television series House.

== Climate ==
According to the Köppen climate classification system, Princeton Borough has a Hot-summer Humid continental climate (Dfa).

Climate data for Princeton Borough (40.3562, -74.6693), 1991-2020 normals, extremes 1981-2024
| Month | Jan | Feb | Mar | Apr | May | Jun | Jul | Aug | Sep | Oct | Nov | Dec | Year |
|---|---|---|---|---|---|---|---|---|---|---|---|---|---|
| Record high °F (°C) | 71.1 (21.7) | 77.7 (25.4) | 87.6 (30.9) | 94.9 (34.9) | 95.4 (35.2) | 97.2 (36.2) | 102.6 (39.2) | 100.3 (37.9) | 97.4 (36.3) | 93.1 (33.9) | 80.3 (26.8) | 75.2 (24.0) | 102.6 (39.2) |
| Mean daily maximum °F (°C) | 39.8 (4.3) | 42.3 (5.7) | 50.2 (10.1) | 62.6 (17.0) | 72.3 (22.4) | 81.4 (27.4) | 86.1 (30.1) | 84.2 (29.0) | 77.8 (25.4) | 65.8 (18.8) | 55.0 (12.8) | 44.8 (7.1) | 63.6 (17.6) |
| Daily mean °F (°C) | 31.3 (−0.4) | 33.2 (0.7) | 40.7 (4.8) | 51.8 (11.0) | 61.5 (16.4) | 70.6 (21.4) | 75.6 (24.2) | 73.8 (23.2) | 67.0 (19.4) | 55.2 (12.9) | 44.9 (7.2) | 36.3 (2.4) | 53.6 (12.0) |
| Mean daily minimum °F (°C) | 22.7 (−5.2) | 24.1 (−4.4) | 31.1 (−0.5) | 41.0 (5.0) | 50.7 (10.4) | 59.9 (15.5) | 65.1 (18.4) | 63.3 (17.4) | 56.2 (13.4) | 44.6 (7.0) | 34.9 (1.6) | 27.9 (−2.3) | 43.6 (6.4) |
| Record low °F (°C) | −11.8 (−24.3) | −3.3 (−19.6) | 3.3 (−15.9) | 17.5 (−8.1) | 31.4 (−0.3) | 40.4 (4.7) | 46.5 (8.1) | 40.9 (4.9) | 35.0 (1.7) | 23.9 (−4.5) | 9.5 (−12.5) | −0.5 (−18.1) | −11.8 (−24.3) |
| Average precipitation inches (mm) | 3.59 (91) | 2.82 (72) | 4.26 (108) | 3.77 (96) | 4.09 (104) | 4.57 (116) | 5.00 (127) | 4.48 (114) | 4.24 (108) | 4.17 (106) | 3.37 (86) | 4.41 (112) | 48.78 (1,239) |
| Average snowfall inches (cm) | 7.7 (20) | 8.4 (21) | 3.8 (9.7) | 0.1 (0.25) | 0.0 (0.0) | 0.0 (0.0) | 0.0 (0.0) | 0.0 (0.0) | 0.0 (0.0) | 0.2 (0.51) | 0.7 (1.8) | 3.6 (9.1) | 24.5 (62) |
| Average dew point °F (°C) | 21.2 (−6.0) | 21.7 (−5.7) | 27.2 (−2.7) | 36.8 (2.7) | 48.8 (9.3) | 59.2 (15.1) | 64.0 (17.8) | 63.4 (17.4) | 57.3 (14.1) | 45.8 (7.7) | 34.5 (1.4) | 26.9 (−2.8) | 42.3 (5.7) |
Source 1: PRISM
Source 2: NOHRSC (Snow, 2008/2009 - 2024/2025 normals)

== Sister cities ==
- Colmar, France
- Pettoranello del Molise, Italy

== Notable people ==
People who were born in, residents of, or otherwise closely associated with Princeton include: Note: this list does not include people whose only time in Princeton was as a student. Only selected faculty are shown, whose notability extends beyond their field into popular culture. See Faculty and Alumni lists above.

- Matthew Abelson, hammered dulcimer player
- Robert Adrain (1775–1843), Irish-born mathematician known for his formulation of the method of least squares
- George Akerlof (born 1940), economist who shared the 2001 Nobel Memorial Prize in Economic Sciences
- Archibald Alexander (1772–1851), Presbyterian theologian and first professor at the Princeton Theological Seminary
- James Waddel Alexander (1804–1859), Presbyterian minister and theologian
- Joseph Addison Alexander (1809–1860), biblical scholar
- William Cowper Alexander (1806–1874), lawyer, politician and insurance executive, who served as President of the New Jersey Senate and as President of the Equitable Life Assurance Society
- Svetlana Alliluyeva (1926–2011), daughter of Joseph Stalin, defected to United States and lived in Princeton
- Lylah M. Alphonse (born 1972), journalist
- Saul Amarel (1928–2002), professor of computer science at Rutgers University, best known for his pioneering work in artificial intelligence
- Trey Anastasio (born 1964), of the band Phish, lived in Princeton with his family and attended Princeton Day School
- Rose Allen (1885–1977), actress
- William H. Angoff (c. 1920–1993), research scientist who worked for the Educational Testing Service, where he helped improve the SAT
- James Isbell Armstrong (1919–2013), academic who was President of Middlebury College from 1963 to 1975
- Milton Babbitt (1916–2011), composer and Princeton University professor
- William Bainbridge (1774–1833), Commodore in the United States Navy
- Molly Bang (born 1943), children's book illustrator
- George Barna (born 1954), founder of The Barna Group, a market research firm specializing in studying the religious beliefs and behavior of Americans
- Chris Barron (born 1968), lead singer of the Spin Doctors
- Leonard E. Baum (1931–2017), mathematician and cryptographer
- Charles Clinton Beatty (1800–1880), Presbyterian minister, seminary founder and academic philanthropist
- Saul Bellow (1915–2005), author and Princeton University professor
- Paul Benacerraf (1930–2025), philosopher and Princeton University professor
- Peter Benchley (1940–2006), author and screenwriter, Jaws, The Island, lived and died in Princeton
- Wendy Benchley (born 1941), marine and environmental conservation advocate and former Princeton Borough councilwoman who was the wife of author Peter Benchley
- Ed Berger (1949–2017), librarian, discographer, author, editor, historian, photographer, educator, jazz producer and record label owner
- Stanley S. Bergen Jr. (1929–2019), physician, university president, and professor, who was President of the University of Medicine and Dentistry of New Jersey from 1971 to 1998
- Laurie Berkner (born 1969), musician best known for her work as a children's musical artist
- Geoffrey Berman (born 1959), lawyer currently serving as the Interim United States Attorney for the Southern District of New York
- Garrett Birkhoff (1911–1996), mathematician best known for his work in lattice theory
- Cyril Edwin Black (1915–1989), professor of history and international affairs, specializing in the modern history of Eastern Europe and, in particular, Russian history since 1700
- William E. Bonini (1926–2016), geologist and geophysicist
- Michael Bradley (born 1987), soccer player
- Avery Brooks (born 1948), actor, singer and educator
- George Harold Brown (1908–1987), research engineer at RCA, lived in Princeton
- Cameron Brink (born 2001), WNBA player for the Los Angeles Sparks
- Aaron Burr (1756–1836), third Vice President of the United States (under Thomas Jefferson); killed Alexander Hamilton in a duel, grew up in Princeton and is buried there
- Aaron Burr Sr. (1715–1757), co-founder of Princeton University and its second president
- Lesley Bush (born 1947), diver who represented the United States at the 1964 Summer Olympics in Tokyo, where she received a gold medal in the 10 meter platform
- Sim Cain (born 1963), drummer for Rollins Band, grew up in Princeton
- Marsha Campbell (born 1946), politician who served in the Missouri House of Representatives
- Melisa Can (born 1984 as Michelle Marie Campbell), professional basketball player at the power forward position who plays for Adana ASKİ
- Mary Chapin Carpenter (born 1958), country/folk singer, born and grew up in Princeton
- William Ashburner Cattell (1863–1920), civil engineer and railroad company president; born in Princeton
- Damien Chazelle (born 1985), film director, producer, and writer. Youngest winner of the Academy Award for Best Director
- Blair Clark (1917–2000), journalist and political activist who was general manager / vice president of CBS News and Senator Eugene McCarthy's national campaign manager for the 1968 presidential nomination
- Patrick Clark (1955–1998), chef
- Frances Folsom Cleveland (1864–1947), First Lady, died in and is buried in Princeton
- Grover Cleveland (1837–1908), 22nd and 24th President of the United States, retired to, died in, and buried in Princeton
- Ruth Cleveland (1891–1904), daughter of Grover and Frances Cleveland born between Cleveland's two terms in office, died at age 12 and is buried at Princeton Cemetery
- Chris Conley (born 1980), lead singer of Saves the Day, born and grew up in Princeton
- Archibald Crossley (1896–1985), pollster, statistician and pioneer in public opinion research
- John Crowley (born 1967), biotechnology executive and entrepreneur and the chairman and CEO of Amicus Therapeutics
- Kelly Curtis (born 1989), skeleton racer who competed at the 2022 Winter Olympics and 2026 Winter Olympics
- Whitney Darrow Jr. (1909–1999), cartoonist at The New Yorker
- Frederic Lansing Day (1890–1981), playwright
- Jon Drezner, architect and designer
- Howard Duffield (1854–1941), Presbyterian minister
- Freeman Dyson (1923–2020), theoretical physicist and fellow at the Institute for Advanced Study
- Jonathan Edwards (1703–1758), Congregationalist Church theologian, Princeton University's third president
- Albert Einstein (1879–1955), physicist, fellow at the Institute for Advanced Study
- Maria (Maja) Einstein (1881–1951), German Romanist and the younger sister of Albert Einstein
- Kate Elderkin (1897–1962), art historian and archaeologist
- T. S. Eliot (1888–1965), author
- Elmer William Engstrom (1901–1984), President and CEO of RCA
- Daniel Errico, children's book author and children's media content creator who is the creator and executive producer of Hulu's kids TV series The Bravest Knight
- Katherine Ettl (c. 1912–1993), sculptor best known for her monumental bronzes
- Charles Evered (born 1964), playwright, screenwriter and director, resident of Princeton
- Henry B. Eyring (born 1933), Second Counselor in the First Presidency of the Church of Jesus Christ of Latter-day Saints and president of Ricks College, born in Princeton
- Robert Fagles (1933–2008), professor, poet, and academic, best known for his many translations of ancient Greek and Roman classics, especially his translations of the epic poems of Homer
- Mervin Field (1921–2015), public opinion pollster whose career in polling began with a poll of Princeton High School students in a class election
- Abner S. Flagg (1851–1923), businessman and politicians, served in the Wisconsin State Assembly and as Mayor of Edgerton, Wisconsin
- Richard Ford (born 1944), writer, taught at Princeton University, wrote several books set in a fictionalized Haddam, New Jersey, based in part on Princeton
- Colette Fu, photographer, book artist and paper engineer
- N. Howell Furman (1892–1965), professor of analytical chemistry who helped develop the electrochemical uranium separation process as part of the Manhattan Project
- George Gallup (1901–1984), statistician and creator of the Gallup poll, lived and is buried in Princeton
- George Gallup Jr. (1930–2011), pollster and author
- Evan Gershkovich (born 1991), journalist for The Wall Street Journal who was detained by Russia as a spy
- Donald Gips (born 1960), Chief Domestic Policy Advisor to Vice President Al Gore who was appointed United States Ambassador to South Africa by Barack Obama
- Kurt Gödel (1906–1978), Austrian-American logician, mathematician and philosopher, fellow at the Institute for Advanced Study
- Rona Goffen (1944–2004), art historian who specialized in Italian Renaissance art
- Caroline Gordon (1895–1981), novelist, lived in Princeton from 1956 to 1975
- Michael Graves (1934–2015), architect, lived and worked in Princeton
- Fred Greenstein (1930–2018), political scientist
- Ariela Gross (born 1965), historian who is the John B. and Alice R. Sharp Professor of Law and History at the University of Southern California Gould School of Law
- Chris Harford, self-taught singer, songwriter, guitarist and painter
- Ethan Hawke (born 1970), actor
- Sarah Hay (born 1987), actress and ballet dancer with the Semperoper in Dresden
- Seth Herzog (born 1970), comedian
- Joseph Hewes (1730–1779), signer of the United States Declaration of Independence, born in Princeton
- James Hillier (1915–2007), scientist and inventor who designed and built the first successful high-resolution electron microscope in North America
- James Robert Hillier (born 1937), architect, developer and educator
- Charles Hodge (1797–1878), theologian and Principal of Princeton Theological Seminary
- Herbert Huffman (1905–1968), musician and choir director, founder of the American Boychoir School
- Harold L. Humes (1926–1992), novelist who was the originator of The Paris Review literary magazine
- Guy Hutchinson (born 1974), author, broadcaster, theme park historian and comedian
- Micky James (born 1993), singer, songwriter and musician
- Barbara Piasecka Johnson (1937–2013), Polish-born American humanitarian, philanthropist, art connoisseur and collector
- Hallett Johnson (1888–1968), career diplomat who served as the United States Ambassador to Costa Rica
- Robert Wood Johnson II (1893–1968), Chairman of Johnson & Johnson lived in Morven
- John Katzenbach (born 1950), author of popular fiction
- Nick Kovalakides (born 1939/1940), javelin thrower
- George F. Kennan (1904–2005), diplomat, historian, fellow at the Institute for Advanced Study
- Bernard Kilgore (1908–1967). managing editor of The Wall Street Journal and president and chairman of Dow Jones & Company
- Gina Kolata (born 1948), reporter for The New York Times
- Barbara Krauthamer (born 1967), historian and author
- Paul Krugman (born 1953), Nobel Prize winner, economist, professor of economics and international affairs at Princeton University
- Matt Lalli (born 1986), professional lacrosse player for the Boston Cannons of Major League Lacrosse
- Chang-Rae Lee (born 1965), writer, Princeton University professor
- Frank Lewin (1925–2008), composer of concert music, film and television scores, and opera
- Arthur Lithgow (1915–2004), actor, director, educator, and managing director of Princeton's McCarter Theatre
- John Lithgow (born 1945), actor, lived in Princeton in his late teens
- Emily Mann (born 1952), artistic director of Princeton's McCarter Theatre
- Thomas Mann (1875–1955), author
- Jumana Manna (born 1987), Palestinian visual artist
- Henry Martin (1925–2020), cartoonist at The New Yorker, who lived and worked in Princeton
- Alpheus T. Mason (1899–1989), legal scholar and biographer
- John McPhee (born 1931), writer, lives in Princeton
- Brad Mays (born 1955), screenwriter, award-winning stage and film director
- Rachel Lambert Mellon (1910–2014), horticulturalist, gardener, philanthropist and art collector
- Lyle and Erik Menendez (born 1968 and born 1970), two brothers convicted of murdering their parents in 1989
- Steve "Buddy" Miller (born 1952), Nashville session musician, grew up in Princeton and attended Princeton High School
- E. Spencer Miller (1817–1879), Dean of the University of Pennsylvania Law School
- Jeannette Mirsky (1903–1987), author who was awarded a Guggenheim Fellowship in 1947 for her biographical writings on the history of exploration
- Toni Morrison (1931–2019), author, Nobel Laureate, Princeton University professor
- Paul Muldoon (born 1951), Irish poet
- Jeanette Mundt (born 1982), painter, best known for her works in the 2019 Whitney Biennial
- James Murray (born 1976), improvisational comedian, author and actor who has starred on Impractical Jokers
- John Forbes Nash Jr. (1928–2015), mathematician, Nobel Prize winner, subject of A Beautiful Mind, Princeton University professor
- Charles Neider (1915–2001), author, Twain scholar; resided on Southern Way
- John von Neumann (1903−1957), Hungarian-American mathematician at Princeton University and Institute for Advanced Study
- Bebe Neuwirth (born 1958), actress, grew up in Princeton
- Joyce Carol Oates (born 1938), writer, Princeton University professor
- John O'Hara (1905–1970), author, lived in and is buried in Princeton
- Charles Smith Olden (1799–1876), Governor of New Jersey during the American Civil War
- A. Dayton Oliphant (1887–1963), Associate Justice of the New Jersey Supreme Court from 1945 to 1946, and from 1948 to 1957
- Gregory Olsen (born 1945), entrepreneur, engineer and scientist who, in October 2005, became the third private citizen to make a self-funded trip to the International Space Station
- J. Robert Oppenheimer (1904–1967), theoretical physicist, director of the Institute for Advanced Study
- Alicia Ostriker (born 1937), poet and scholar who writes Jewish feminist poetry
- Jeremiah P. Ostriker (1937–2025), astronomer
- Unity Phelan (born 1994 or 1995), ballet dancer who joined the New York City Ballet in 2013 and was promoted to soloist in 2017
- John Popper (born 1967), lead singer of the band Blues Traveler
- Andy Potts (born 1976), triathlete who represented the United States in triathlon at the 2004 Summer Olympics
- Pete Raymond (born 1947), former rower who competed in the 1968 Summer Olympics and in the 1972 Summer Olympics
- Christopher Reeve (1952–2004), actor, grew up in Princeton, attended Princeton Day School
- Paul Robeson (1898–1976), singer, actor, athlete, civil rights activist, born and raised in Princeton
- Henry A. Rosso (1917–1999), leader in the formal development of the fundraising profession in the United States
- Arnold Roth (born 1929), cartoonist, longtime Princeton resident
- William E. Schluter (1927–2018), politician who served in the New Jersey General Assembly and the New Jersey Senate
- Ralph Schoenstein (1933–2006), writer, lived in Princeton up to his death
- John Schneider (born 1980), professional baseball coach for the Toronto Blue Jays
- Bill Schroeder (born 1958), Major League Baseball player for the Milwaukee Brewers and California Angels, Brewers commentator for Fox Sports Wisconsin
- Roger Sessions (1896–1985), composer, Princeton University professor
- Tsutomu Shimomura (born 1964), Japanese-American scientist and computer security expert
- Andrew Shue (born 1967), actor and professional soccer player, grew up in northern New Jersey with sister, actress Elisabeth Shue, lives in Princeton
- Michael Showalter (born 1970), comedian, actor, writer, and director, born in Princeton, attended Princeton High School
- Barbara Boggs Sigmund (1939–1990), mayor of Princeton
- Peter Singer (born 1946), moral philosopher, bioethicist and Princeton University professor
- Shelley Smith (1952–2023), actress
- Tom Snow (born 1947), musician
- Gennady Spirin (born 1948), artist
- Doreen Canaday Spitzer (1914–2010), archaeologist
- Betsey Stockton (c. 1798–1865), educator and missionary, manumitted from slavery and later retired to and died in Princeton
- John P. Stockton (1826–1900), U.S. senator from New Jersey, lived in Princeton
- Richard Stockton (1730–1781), signer of the United States Declaration of Independence, lived in and is buried in Princeton
- Richard Stockton (1764–1828), U.S. senator from New Jersey, lived in Princeton
- Robert F. Stockton (1795–1866), United States Navy commodore, U.S. Military Governor of California, lived in Princeton
- Janet Sorg Stoltzfus, (1931–2004), educator, who established the Ta'iz Cooperative School, the first non-religious school in north Yemen
- Robert Stone (born 1958, class of 1976), director and documentary filmmaker
- Jon Tenney (born 1961), actor, born and raised in Princeton
- Paul Tulane (1801–1887), benefactor and namesake of Tulane University
- Shawn Tully (born 1948). business journalist at Fortune magazine
- Immanuel Velikovsky (1895–1979), controversial theorist and acquaintance of Albert Einstein
- Brandon Wagner (born 1995), professional baseball player
- Susie Ione Brown Waxwood (1902–2006), clubwoman and YWCA official in Princeton
- Andrew Wiles (born 1953), mathematician who proved Fermat's Last Theorem, Princeton University professor
- Woodrow Wilson (1856–1924), 28th President of the United States, 13th president of Princeton University, Governor of New Jersey
- John Witherspoon (1723–1794), signer of the United States Declaration of Independence, president of Princeton University
- Edward Witten (born 1951), mathematician and physicist, fellow at the Institute for Advanced Study
- Richard L. Wright (born 1943), political leader who held a number of positions at both the state and national level
- Sarah Zelenka (born 1987), rower at the 2012 Summer Olympics
- Vladimir K. Zworykin (1888–1982), Russian-American engineer, inventor and television pioneer

== In popular culture ==
=== Film ===
Princeton was the setting of the Academy Award-winning A Beautiful Mind about the schizophrenic mathematician John Nash. It was largely filmed in central New Jersey, including some Princeton locations. However, many scenes of "Princeton" were actually filmed at Fordham University's Rose Hill campus in the Bronx.

The 1994 film I.Q., featuring Meg Ryan, Tim Robbins, and Walter Matthau as Albert Einstein, was also set in Princeton and was filmed in the area. It includes some geographic stretches, including Matthau looking through a telescope from the roof of "Princeton Hospital" to see Ryan and Robbins' characters kissing on the Princeton Battlefield.

Historical films which used Princeton as a setting but were not filmed there include Wilson, a 1944 biographical film about Woodrow Wilson.

In his 1989 independent feature film Stage Fright, independent filmmaker Brad Mays shot a drama class scene in the Princeton High School auditorium, using PHS students as extras. On October 18, 2013, Mays' feature documentary I Grew Up in Princeton had its premiere showing at Princeton High School. The film, described in one Princeton newspaper as a "deeply personal 'coming-of-age story' that yields perspective on the role of perception in a town that was split racially, economically and sociologically", is a portrayal of life in the venerable university town during the tumultuous period of the late sixties through the early seventies.

Scenes from the beginning of Across the Universe (2007) were filmed on the Princeton University campus.

Parts of Transformers: Revenge of the Fallen were filmed in Princeton. Megan Fox and Shia LaBeouf were filming on Princeton University campus for two days during the summer of 2008.

Scenes from the 2008 movie The Happening were filmed in Princeton.

The play and the 1986 movie Extremities, takes place in a remote farm house. Which is located someplace between Princeton and Trenton, NJ

In 1974, Captain Kirk (William Shatner) himself did a commercial in Palmer Square. He extolled the benefits of Promise Margarine!

Paul Rudd was the star of the movie "Admission" A comedy/drama about admission process/ the tumultuous journey, some students take, to get into an elite school Scenes were shot on the Princeton University campus.

Extremities, which was first a play, then a movie starring Farrah Fawcett. The story is centered in a seculded farmhouse inbetween Princeton and Trenton, NJ.

=== TV and radio ===
The 1938 Orson Welles radio broadcast of The War of the Worlds, is set partly in nearby Grover's Mill, and includes a fictional professor from Princeton University as a main character, but the action never moves directly into Princeton.

The 1980 television miniseries Oppenheimer is partly set in Princeton.

George Lucas's Young Indiana Jones television series, a spin-off of the Indiana Jones film franchise, showcases Princeton in three episodes. Princeton is the hometown of the main character, archaeologist and adventurer Indiana Jones, whose father, Henry Jones, Sr. is a university professor. Princeton features prominently in the episodes "Spring Break Adventure" and "Winds of Change," though the Princeton scenes were actually filmed in Wilmington and Durham, North Carolina.

The TV show House was set in Princeton, at the fictional Princeton-Plainsboro Teaching Hospital, and establishing shots for the hospital display the Frist Campus Center of Princeton University. The actual University Medical Center of Princeton at Plainsboro opened on May 22, 2012, exactly one day after the finale of House aired.

=== Literature ===
F. Scott Fitzgerald's literary debut, This Side of Paradise, is a loosely autobiographical story of his years at Princeton University.

Princeton University's Creative Writing program includes several nationally and internationally prominent writers, making the community a hub of contemporary literature.

Many of Richard Ford's novels are set in Haddam, New Jersey, a fictionalized Princeton.

Joyce Carol Oates' 2004 novel Take Me, Take Me With You (written pseudonymously as Lauren Kelly) is set in Princeton.

New Jersey author Judy Blume set her novel Superfudge in Princeton.

=== Music ===
All of the members of Blues Traveler, as well as Chris Barron, lead singer of the Spin Doctors, are from Princeton and were high school friends.

== Points of interest ==
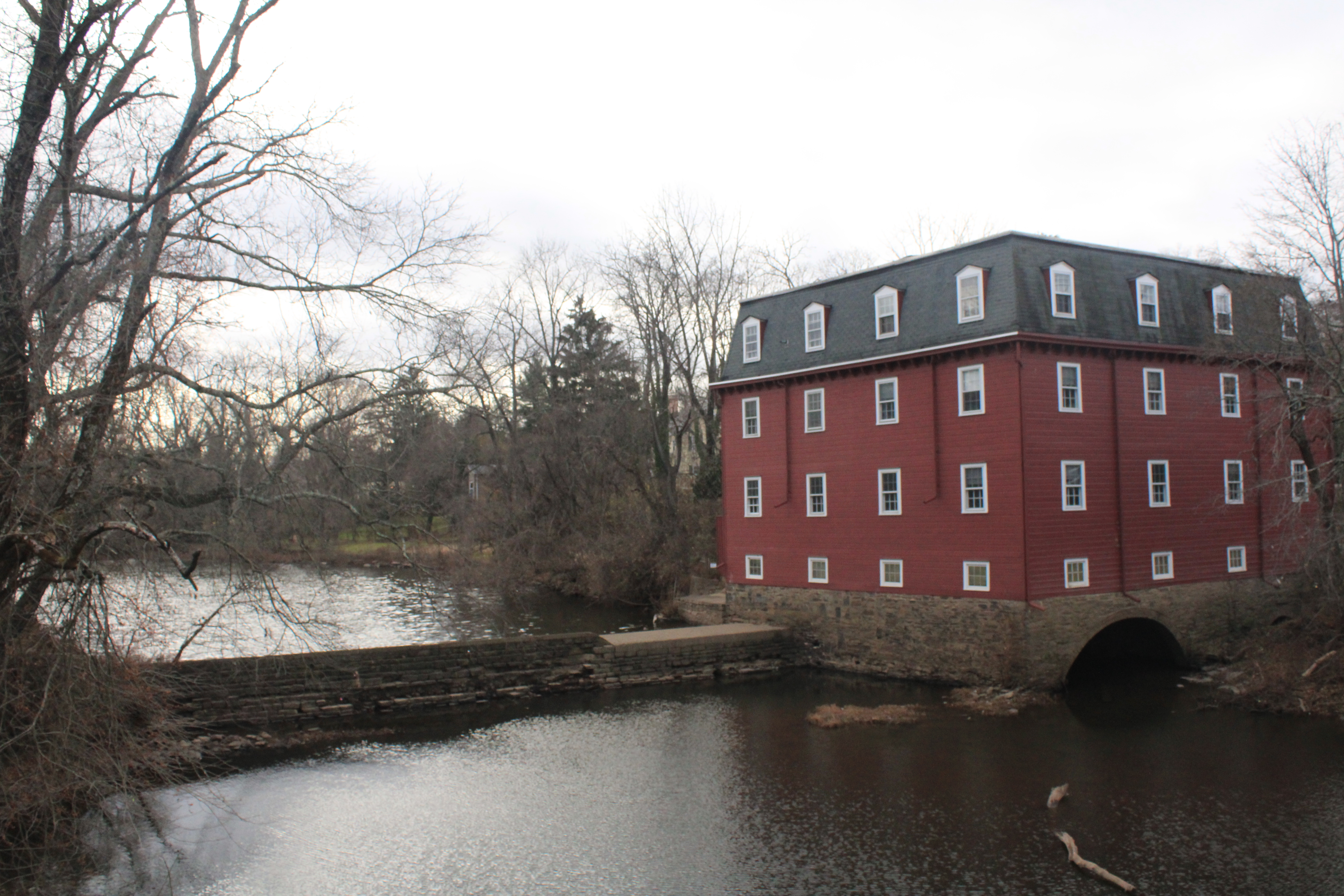
Kingston Mill Historic District on the Millstone River

=== Churches ===
- Nassau Christian Center
- Nassau Presbyterian Church
- Princeton United Methodist Church
- Princeton University Chapel
- St Paul's Roman Catholic Church
- Stone Hill Church of Princeton
- Stony Brook Meeting House and Cemetery
- Trinity Church, Princeton
- Princeton Seventh-Day Adventist Church

=== Educational institutions ===
- Institute for Advanced Study and Institute Woods
- Princeton Theological Seminary
- Princeton University

=== Museums ===
- Morven
- Princeton University Art Museum

=== Historic sites ===
- Albert Einstein House, located at 112 Mercer Street, was the home of Albert Einstein from 1936 until his death in 1955.
- Drumthwacket, the official residence of the governor of New Jersey, is one of only four official governor's residences in the country that is not located within its state capital.
- Jasna Polana
- Jugtown Historic District is a cluster of historic buildings around the intersection of Harrison and Nassau Street that dates to colonial times.
- King's Highway Historic District
- Kingston Mill Historic District
- Maybury Hill is the boyhood home of Joseph Hewes, who later moved to North Carolina and was a signer of the United States Declaration of Independence for that state.
- Mountain Avenue Historic District
- Nassau Club
- Nassau Hall
- Nassau Inn
- Princeton Battlefield State Park
- Princeton Battle Monument
- Princeton Cemetery
- Princeton Historic District
- Princeton Ice Company
- Tusculum
- Updike Farmstead
- The Washington Oak
- Westland Mansion
- Witherspoon Street School for Colored Children

=== Parks ===
- The Delaware and Raritan Canal State Park including the 9-acre (3.6 ha) Turning Basin Park and miles of level biking/hiking trails along its towpath
- Herrontown Woods Arboretum
- Lake Carnegie
- Marquand Park
- Mountain Lakes Preserve
- Palmer Square
- Princeton Battlefield State Park
- Woodfield Reservation
- Small "pocket parks" in the downtown area:
  - Barbara Boggs Sigmund Garden - Hamilton Avenue at Chestnut Street
  - David Bradford Park - 53 Pine Street
  - Harrison Street Park - at Nassau and Harrison Street
  - Mary Moss Park - John Street
  - Potts Park - 1 Erdman Avenue

=== Restaurants ===
- Elements
- Peacock Inn
- Whole Earth Center (vegetarian)

== Local media ==
- Princeton Packet
- Princeton Town Topics
- Planet Princeton

== See also ==
- USS Princeton, 6 ships

== Sources ==
- Clark, Ronald W. (1971). Einstein: The Life and Times. ISBN 0-380-44123-3.
- Gambee, Robert (1987). Princeton. ISBN 0-393-30433-7.

| Preceded by Philadelphia, Pennsylvania | Capital of the United States of America; 1783 | Succeeded by Annapolis, Maryland |
