= David Bradford Park =

Public park in Princeton, New Jersey

Coordinates: 40°21′14″N 74°39′05″W

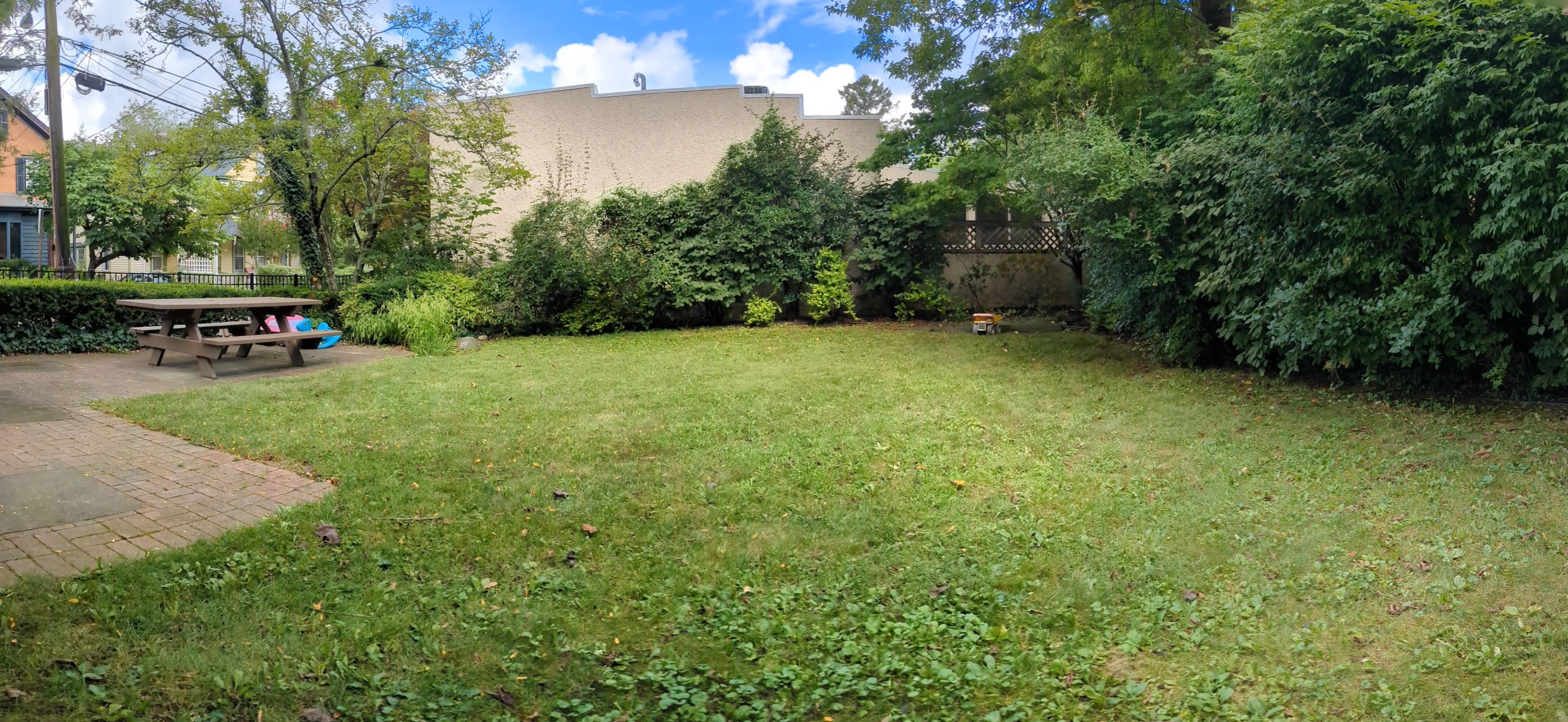
A panorama of the David Bradford mini-park, taken in 2023

The David Bradford Park is a small public park located at 53 Pine Street in Princeton, New Jersey. Containing only a bench, a picnic table, and a few toys for toddlers, this mini-park is half a block away from Princeton’s central business district on Nassau Street.

== Renaming ==
Formerly known as Pine Street Park, it was renamed in 2005 for David Bradford, an economics professor at Princeton University who had lived on Pine Street until his accidental death, after his family made a grant for the park's improvement.

== Pocket park ==
The park is one of several "mini-parks" in the former Princeton Borough that are maintained by the Princeton Recreation Department. These small parks are also sometimes called "pocket parks".
