= St. Paul's School (New Jersey) =

St. Paul Catholic School

Location
- 218 Nassau Street, Princeton, New Jersey; United States; 40°21′06.7″N 74°39′12.2″W

Information
- Type: Private, Coeducational
- Motto: Spiritus Gladius (The Sword of the Spirit)
- Religious affiliation: Roman Catholic
- Established: 1880
- Oversight: Diocese of Trenton
- Principal: Kim Clauss
- Chaplain: Monsignor Joseph Rosie
- Faculty: 30
- Grades: K-8
- Enrollment: 400
- Campus size: 3.5 acres (1.4 ha)
- Campus type: suburban
- Colors: Blue; Gold
- Tuition: $4,830 (St. Paul Parish), $6,035 (Other Parish), $7,650 (Non-Parish) (2015)
- Website: www.spsprinceton.org

St. Paul School of Princeton is a Catholic K-8 parochial school attached to St. Paul's Catholic Church in Princeton, New Jersey. It traces its origins to the founding of the parish in 1850, when classes began in the church basement. The Sisters of Mercy took responsibility for the school in 1878 and a dedicated building was opened at 218 Nassau Street in 1880. The current structure dates to 1930 and the school is home to around 400 students and 30 faculty.

== Gallery ==
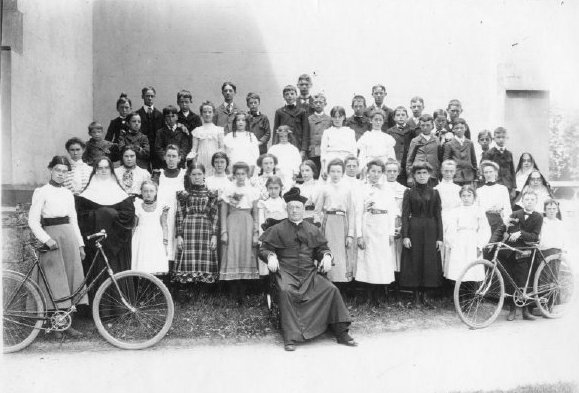
Students and staff of the school in 1910

== Notable Former Pupils ==
- Margaret Ellen Fox - A 14-year-old American girl who vanished under suspicious circumstances in Burlington, New Jersey, in 1974.
