= Whole Earth Center =

Grocery store in Princeton, New Jersey

Coordinates: 40°21′16″N 74°38′41″W

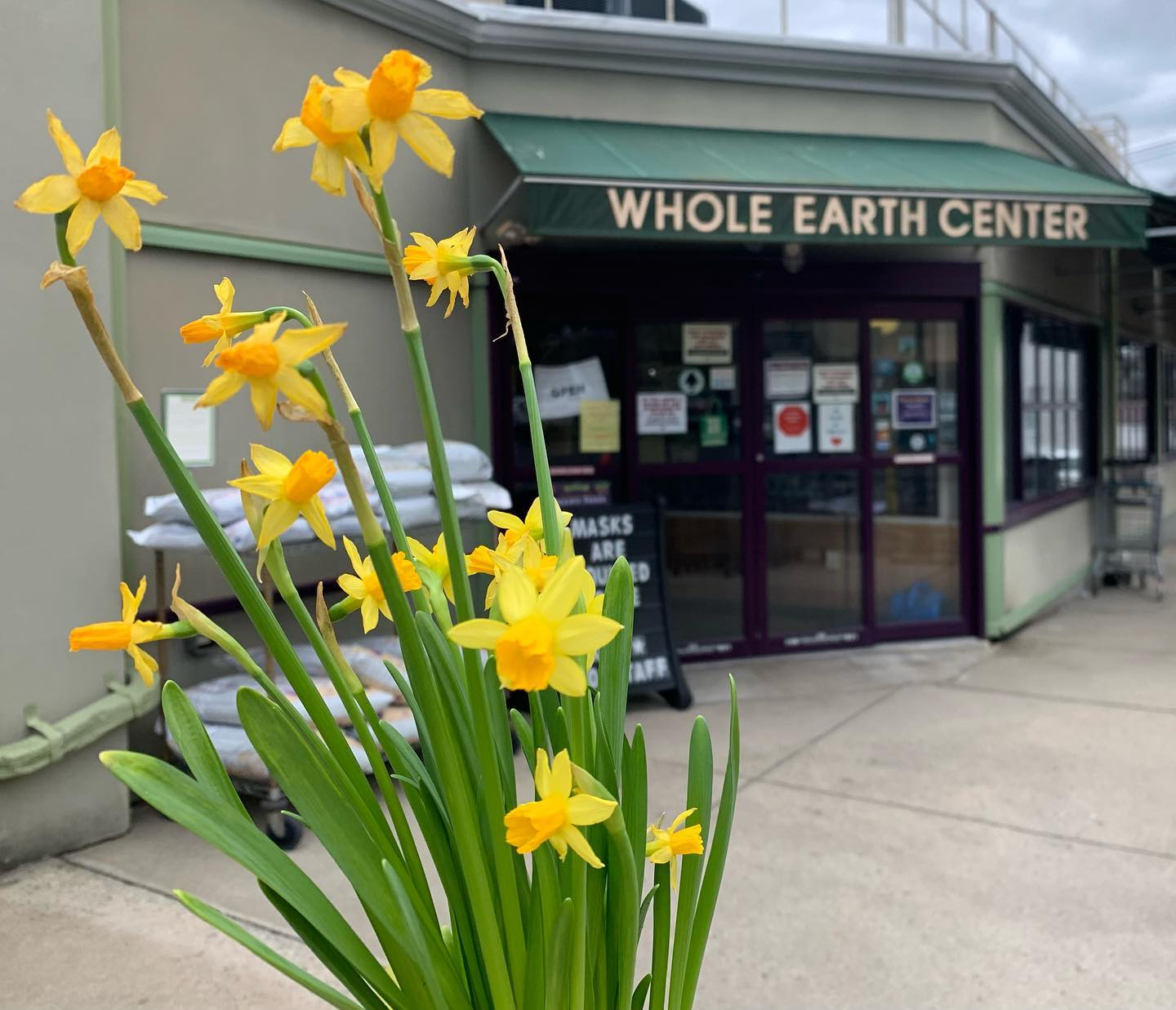
Entryway of Whole Earth Center in Princeton, NJ, in March 2022.

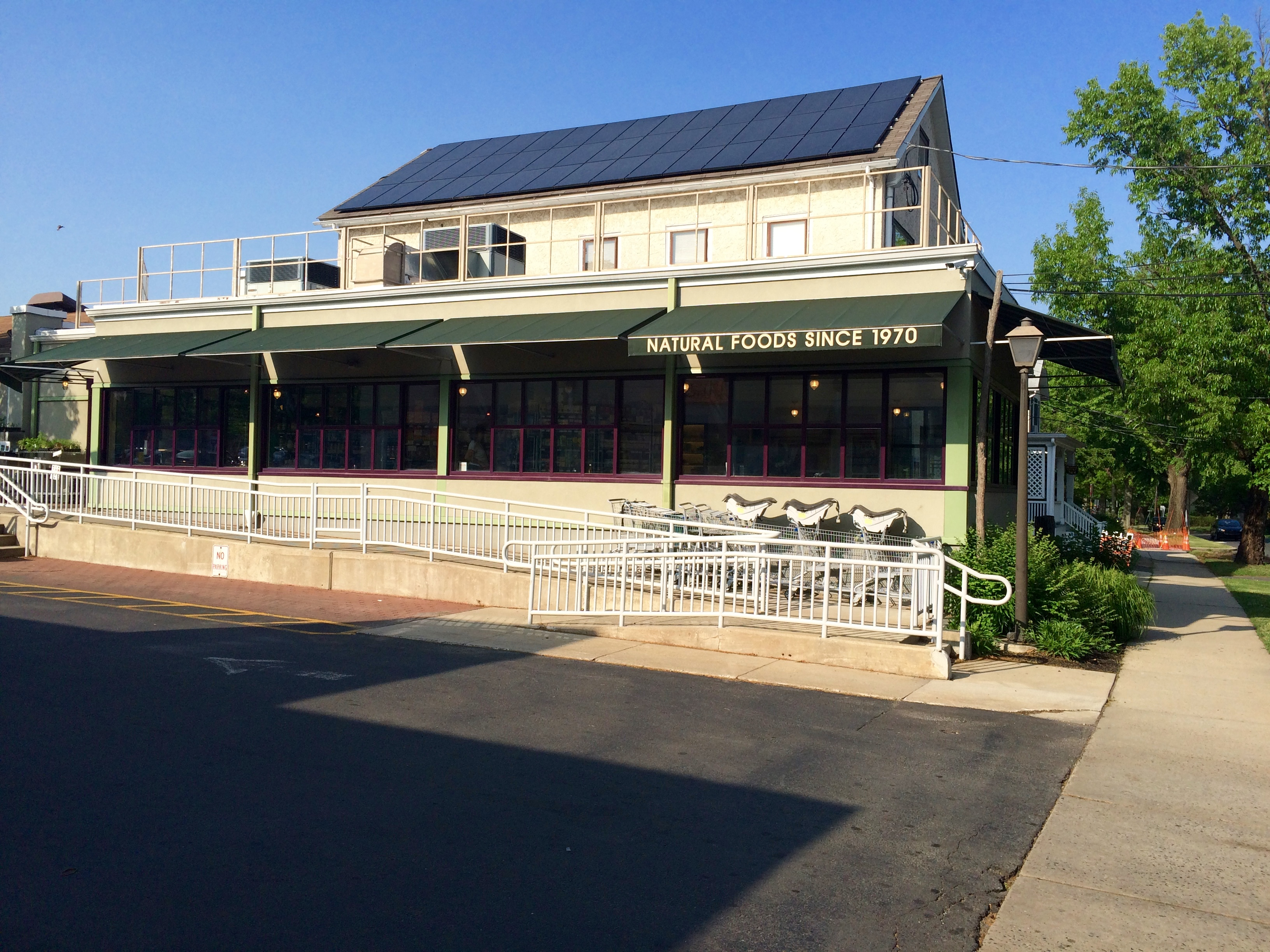
The Whole Earth Center building, as viewed from Nassau St. facing northeast.

The Whole Earth Center is a non-profit organic food grocery store and vegetarian eatery at 360 Nassau Street in Princeton, New Jersey that specializes in bulk items. Mid-year, tables and benches outside the store provide expansion seating for diners. Governed by a non-profit board, the store earns money from sales and pays taxes. However, they spend all of their earnings on programs for healthy living such as Bike to Work Week, the annual Princeton Environmental Film Festival, Princeton School Gardens Cooperative, the Suppers Program (now rebranded as "Eating for your Health"), The Town Topics newspaper, the Trenton Area Soup Kitchen the D&R Greenway and Friends of Herrontown Woods.

== History ==
The Whole Earth Center was founded in April 1970, the same year as the first Earth Day, to provide healthy, sustainable food choices and to raise funds to reduce harmful impacts on the environment. The founders were five women: Barbara Parmet, Florence Falk, Margot Sutherland, Hella McVay and Susy Waterman, who raised $4,500 in a door-to-door, child-in-tow, funding campaign that enabled them to purchase the center's initial stock of bulk foods. The store's original location was a 10-square-foot space at the intersection of Pine and Nassau Streets. The store moved to its current location near the intersection of N. Harrison St and Nassau St six months after its founding. In 1994, it increased its footprint by expanding into the neighboring store's space, and in 2008, it conducted a LEED-certified renovation of the entire building that added solar panels to its roof.

== Location ==
The Whole Earth Center's parking lot can be accessed and exited on Nassau Street and North Harrison Street.

== See also ==
- Bulk foods
- Organic food culture
