= Notman =

Notman may refer to:

== People ==
- Alex Notman (born 1979), Scottish football player
- John Notman (1810–1865), Scottish-born American architect
- William Notman (disambiguation), multiple people, including:
  - William Notman (1826–1891), Canadian photographer and businessman
  - William Notman (politician) Q.C. (1805–1865), lawyer and political figure in Canada West
  - William Notman (architect) (1809–1893), Scottish architect

== Other uses ==
- Notman Bridge, historic concrete arch bridge over the Ausable River at Keene Valley in Essex County, New York
- Notman House, historic building in Montreal, Quebec
- Notman Photographic Archives, archive of photographic images originally collected by photographer William Notman
- Not Man, a mascot sometimes used by the American heavy metal band Anthrax

== See also ==
- Harold Nottman (1917–2008), New Zealand cricketer
- Kevin Noteman (born 1969), English footballer
