= Walter Lowrie House (Princeton, New Jersey) =

- U.S. Historic district – Contributing property
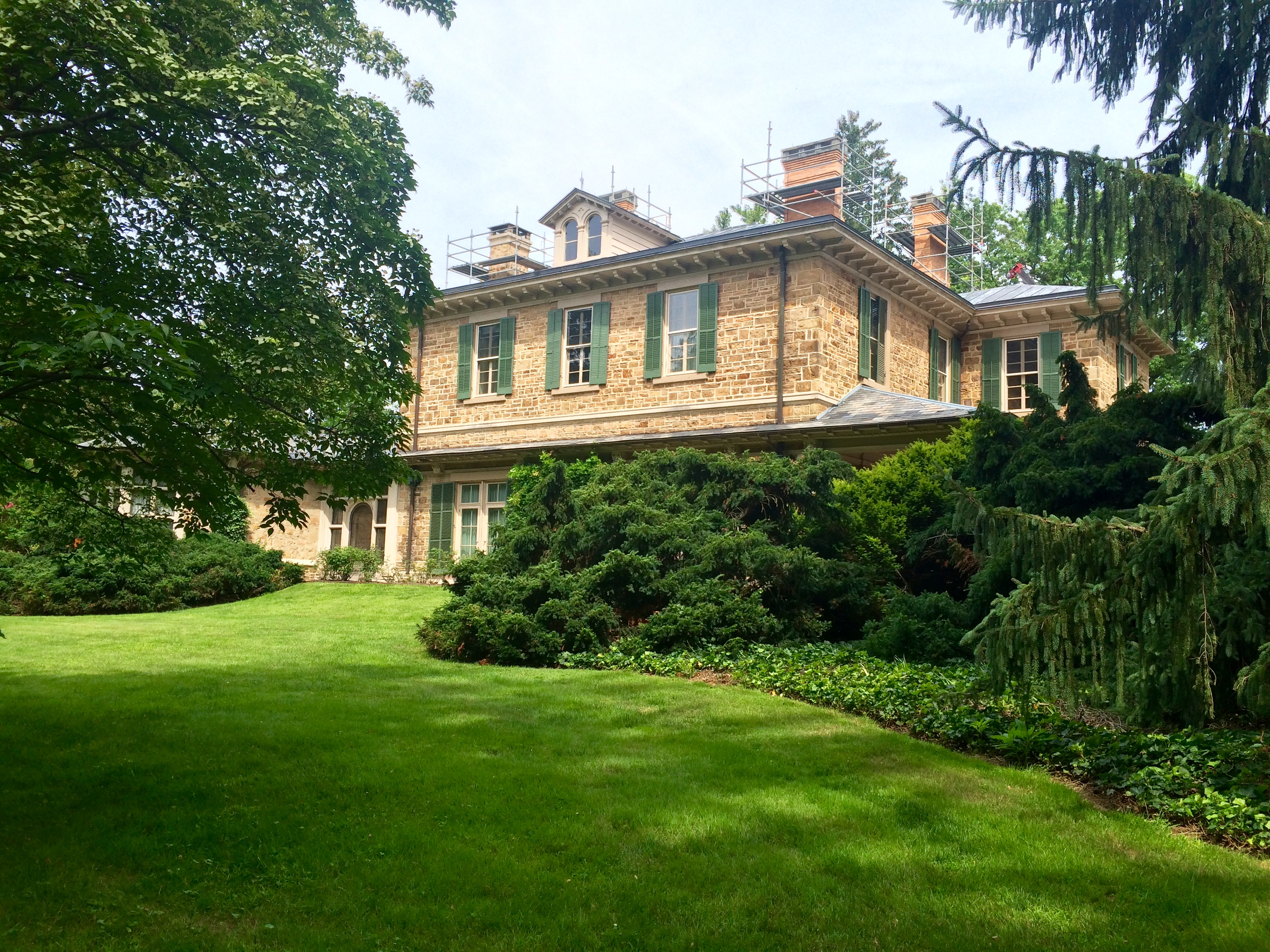

- Location within Mercer County, New Jersey Location within New Jersey Location within the United States
- Location: 83 Stockton Street, Princeton, New Jersey, United States
- Coordinates: 40°20′46.9″N 74°40′09.3″W
- Built: 1845
- Architect: John Notman
- Architectural style: Italianate
- Part of: Princeton Historic District (ID75001143)
- Added to NRHP: 27 June 1975

The Walter Lowrie House is located at 83 Stockton Street in Princeton, New Jersey, United States, and is the official residence of the president of Princeton University. The mansion was built in 1845 by Commodore Robert F. Stockton for his son John P. Stockton, both senators from New Jersey. Prior to being a senator the younger Stockton had served as the Attorney General of New Jersey and later as ambassador to Italy. Commodore Stockton was the son of Richard Stockton, another New Jersey Senator, and grandson of Richard Stockton, a signer of the Declaration of Independence. The latter Richard Stockton built Morven in the 18th century, which sits a short distance up Stockton Street. His grandfather's home, known as the "Barracks" is found at 32 Edgehill Street, the street which fronts the gate to the Walter Lowrie House property. It was built in the 17th century and gained its name from having served as a barracks in either the French and Indian War or the American Revolution.

The Walter Lowrie House was the work of architect John Notman, who designed a number of mansions for the Stockton family including nearby Guernsey Hall and Prospect House. Notman popularized the Italianate revival architecture in the United States and his Princeton homes are prime examples of that style.

The home was purchased from John P Stockton by Paul Tulane, best known for endowing Tulane University in New Orleans. In 1895 it was acquired by George Allison Armour, whose daughter Barbara would take up the residence in 1930 along with her husband, Walter Lowrie. Walter Lowrie had served for many years as the Episcopal rector of St Paul's Within the Walls, sometimes known as the American Church in Rome. Lowrie was a noted Kierkegaardian theologian and translator, spending his retirement in Princeton publishing academic works, including twelve volumes of Kierkegaard translations. After his death in 1959, his wife donated the home to Princeton University in memory of her husband, who had been a member of the Princeton class of 1890. It was used as a guest house by the university from 1960 to 1968 and subsequently became the official residence of the president of the university. The official residence had originally been Maclean House, built 1756. From 1878-1968, it had been Prospect House but was moved to Walter Lowrie House, which is off campus grounds. Prospect House then became the site of a faculty club.
