= List of National Historic Landmarks in New Jersey =

This is a List of National Historic Landmarks in New Jersey and other landmarks of equivalent landmark status in the state. The United States National Historic Landmark (NHL) program is operated under the auspices of the National Park Service, and recognizes structures, districts, objects, and similar resources according to a list of criteria of national significance. There are 58 NHLs in New Jersey.

== Key ==
	National Historic Landmark
^{†}	National Historic Landmark District
^{#}	National Historic Site, National Historical Park, National Memorial, or National Monument
^{*}	Delisted Landmark

== Current NHLs in New Jersey ==
There are NHLs in seventeen of the twenty-one counties in the state. Mercer County has fourteen NHLs, in and around Princeton, New Jersey.

	Landmark name	Image	Date designated	Location	County	Description
1^{†}	Abbott Farm Historic District	Abbott Farm Historic District	December 8, 1976 (#76001158)	Hamilton Township, Bordentown Township, and Bordentown; 40°11′10″N 74°43′37″W	Mercer and Burlington	Largest known Indian Woodland village archaeological site inhabited from 500 BC to 500 AD; Encompasses John A. Roebling Park, Hamilton-Trenton-Bordentown Marsh, and other nearby properties.
2	All Saints' Memorial Church Complex	All Saints' Memorial Church Complex	December 23, 1987 (#74001179)	Navesink; 40°23′54″N 74°01′15″W	Monmouth	A stone Gothic church designed by Richard Upjohn
3	Atlantic City Convention Hall	Atlantic City Convention Hall	February 27, 1987 (#87000814)	Atlantic City; 39°21′18″N 74°26′19″W	Atlantic	The famous convention hall on Boardwalk used for everything from the Miss America pageant to WrestleMania
4	John Ballantine House	John Ballantine House	February 4, 1985 (#73001093)	Newark; 40°44′35″N 74°10′17″W	Essex	Home of John Ballantine, of the Ballantine brewing family. Now part of the Newark Museum
5^{†}	Baltusrol Golf Club	Baltusrol Golf Club	August 25, 2014 (#05000374)	Springfield; 40°42′18″N 74°19′41″W	Union	The courses designed 1918–26 brought architect A. W. Tillinghast into prominence within American golfing.
6	Pietro and Maria Botto House	Pietro and Maria Botto House	December 17, 1982 (#74001188)	Haledon; 40°56′06″N 74°11′18″W	Passaic	Rallying point of the Paterson Silk Strike of 1913, now home to the American Labor Museum
7	Boxwood Hall	Boxwood Hall	November 28, 1972 (#70000397)	Elizabeth; 40°39′49″N 74°12′37″W	Union	Home of Elias Boudinot, president of the Continental Congress, site of George Washington's luncheon before his inauguration, home of Jonathan Dayton, signer of the Declaration of Independence
8	Burlington County Prison	Burlington County Prison	June 24, 1986 (#86003558)	Mt Holly; 39°59′48″N 74°47′21″W	Burlington	Oldest operating United States prison when it closed in 1965
9^{†}	Camp Evans	Camp Evans	October 16, 2012 (#02000274)	Wall Township; 40°11′06″N 74°03′28″W	Monmouth	A former military base.
10^{†}	Cape May Historic District	Cape May Historic District	May 11, 1976 (#70000383)	Cape May; 38°56′13″N 74°54′40″W	Cape May	The country's oldest seaside resort at the southernmost point in New Jersey
11^{†}	Clark Thread Company Historic District	Clark Thread Company Historic District	June 2, 1978 (#78001764)	East Newark; 40°45′07″N 74°09′43″W	Hudson	A large cotton thread mill complex which helped lead to textile industrialization.
12	Grover Cleveland Home	Grover Cleveland Home	June 23, 1965 (#66000463)	Princeton; 40°21′05″N 74°40′04″W	Mercer	Home of Grover Cleveland after he left the White House
13	Craftsman Farms	Craftsman Farms	December 14, 1990 (#85003730)	Parsippany-Troy Hills; 40°51′27″N 74°28′48″W	Morris	A farm and school for the Arts and Crafts movement, founded by Gustav Stickley
14	Albert Einstein House	Albert Einstein House	January 7, 1976 (#76002297)	Princeton; 40°20′40″N 74°40′01″W	Mercer	The home of Albert Einstein after his flight from Germany until his death.
15^{†}	Fort Hancock and the Sandy Hook Proving Ground Historic District	Fort Hancock and the Sandy Hook Proving Ground Historic District	December 17, 1982 (#80002505)	Sandy Hook; 40°27′50″N 74°00′10″W	Monmouth	This coastal artillery base played an important part in the defense of New York Harbor
16	T. Thomas Fortune House	T. Thomas Fortune House	December 8, 1976 (#76001171)	Red Bank; 40°20′29″N 74°04′26″W	Monmouth	Home of Timothy Thomas Fortune, a slave who became a leading Afro-American journalist and civil rights advocate
17^{†}	Georgian Court	Georgian Court	February 4, 1985 (#78001788)	Lakewood; 40°05′56″N 74°13′44″W	Ocean	The former winter estate of millionaire George Jay Gould, now a university. It has a real tennis court, one of only forty five in the world
18	Grace Church	Grace Church	December 23, 1987 (#72000776)	Newark; 40°43′51″N 74°10′28″W	Essex	Historic Episcopal Church. Grace Church's organist Samuel A. Ward composed the tune for "America the Beautiful." Designed by Richard Upjohn, this Gothic church was a major influence to other American Gothic revival architects.
19	Great Atlantic and Pacific Tea Company Warehouse	Great Atlantic and Pacific Tea Company Warehouse	June 2, 1978 (#78001766)	Jersey City; 40°43′16″N 74°02′24″W	Hudson	Part of A&P's distribution network, this 9 story concrete building is now an artist live/work space.
20^{†}	Great Falls of the Passaic/Society for Establishing Useful Manufacturers H.D.	Great Falls of the Passaic/Society for Establishing Useful Manufacturers H.D.	May 11, 1976 (#70000391)	Paterson; 40°54′58″N 74°10′54″W	Passaic	A powerful and dramatic waterfall which also was heavy used during the Industrial Revolution
21	Hadrosaurus Foulkii Leidy Site	Hadrosaurus Foulkii Leidy Site	October 12, 1994 (#94001648)	Haddonfield; 39°54′37″N 75°01′38″W	Camden	Where the first relatively complete set of dinosaur bones in the world were discovered in 1858 by William Parker Foulke, a member of the Philadelphia Academy of Natural Sciences, and subsequently removed, preserved, and named (Hadrosaurus foulkii) by Joseph Leidy, also of the Academy..
22	Hangar No. 1, Lakehurst Naval Air Station	Hangar No. 1, Lakehurst Naval Air Station	May 23, 1968 (#68000031)	Lakehurst; 40°01′44″N 74°19′00″W	Ocean	Site of the Hindenburg disaster on May 6, 1937
23	Joseph Henry House	Joseph Henry House	January 12, 1965 (#66000464)	Princeton; 40°20′58″N 74°39′32″W	Mercer	Home of Joseph Henry, whose scientific research on electromagnetic self-inductance led to the electrical telegraph. He was also the first Secretary of the Smithsonian Institution
24	Hermitage	Hermitage	May 22, 1970 (#70000379)	Ho-Ho-Kus; 41°00′24″N 74°07′10″W	Bergen	A stone house where George Washington stayed during the American Revolutionary War, it was later the site of the wedding of Aaron Burr and Theodosia Prevost. Now a museum.
25	Hinchliffe Stadium	Hinchliffe Stadium	February 25, 2013 (#04000223)	Paterson; 40°55′06″N 74°10′52″W	Passaic	A 1930s-era baseball stadium used to play Negro league baseball during the Jim Crow era.
26	Holland Tunnel	Holland Tunnel	November 4, 1993 (#93001619)	Jersey City and New York, NY; 40°43′47″N 74°02′18″W	Hudson, NJ and New York, NY	One of the earliest examples of a ventilated design, the Holland Tunnel crosses under the Hudson River connecting New Jersey and Manhattan
27	Francis Hopkinson House	Francis Hopkinson House	July 17, 1971 (#71000496)	Bordentown; 40°08′54″N 74°42′50″W	Burlington	The home of Francis Hopkinson, a signer of the United States Declaration of Independence
28	Horn Antenna	Horn Antenna	December 20, 1989 (#89002457)	Holmdel; 40°23′27″N 74°11′05″W	Monmouth	Arno Penzias and Robert Wilson discovered the microwave background radiation that permeates the universe using this antenna. This work earned them the 1978 Nobel Prize for Physics and contributed to the confirmation of the Big Bang theory.
29^{†}	Lawrenceville School	Lawrenceville School	February 24, 1986 (#86000158)	Lawrenceville; 40°17′38″N 74°43′49″W	Mercer	A boarding school typically associated with Princeton University
30	William Livingston House	William Livingston House	November 28, 1972 (#72000807)	Union; 40°40′43″N 74°13′43″W	Union	Home of William Livingston, member of the first and second Continental Congress, signer of the United States Constitution, and first elected Governor of New Jersey. Now part of the Kean University
31	Lucy the Margate Elephant	Lucy the Margate Elephant	May 11, 1976 (#71000493)	Margate City; 39°19′14″N 74°30′43″W	Atlantic	Built in 1882, this six-story elephant-shaped architectural folly is the oldest example of zoomorphic architecture
32	Maybury Hill	Maybury Hill	November 11, 1971 (#71000502)	Princeton; 40°22′03″N 74°38′29″W	Mercer	Boyhood home of Joseph Hewes, a signer of the United States Declaration of Independence
33	Minisink Archeological Site	Minisink Archeological Site	April 19, 1993 (#93000608)	Delaware Water Gap NRA; 41°05′36″N 74°59′32″W	Sussex, NJ and Pike, PA	This archeological site was one of the most important Munsee Native American communities during the initial contact with the American colonials
34^{†}	Monmouth Battlefield	Monmouth Battlefield	January 20, 1961 (#66000467)	Freehold Township / Manalapan Township; 40°16′23″N 74°18′50″W	Monmouth	Site of the Battle of Monmouth on June 28, 1778, during the American Revolutionary War
35	Morven	Morven	July 17, 1971 (#71000503)	Princeton; 40°20′51″N 74°40′01″W	Mercer	Built in 1754 by Richard Stockton (1730-1781), a signer of the Declaration of Independence. It served as the New Jersey Governors mansion from 1945 until 1982 and is now a museum.
36	Nassau Hall	Nassau Hall	October 9, 1960 (#66000465)	Princeton; 40°20′55″N 74°39′34″W	Mercer	The oldest building at Princeton University and the largest in New Jersey when it was built in 1754. It served as the home of the American government from June to November 1783.
37	Thomas Nast Home	Thomas Nast Home	January 29, 1964 (#66000470)	Morristown; 40°47′30″N 74°28′50″W	Morris	One of the first editorial cartoonists, Thomas Nast, helped bring down Tammany Hall and created iconic images of Santa Claus, the Democratic Donkey, and the Republican Elephant
38	Navesink Light Station	Navesink Light Station	February 17, 2006 (#06000237)	Highlands; 40°23′47″N 73°59′09″W	Monmouth	A twin light station that guided ships into New York Harbor and was the first use of Fresnel lenses in the United States.
39	New St. Mary's Episcopal Church	New St. Mary's Episcopal Church	June 24, 1986 (#72000770)	Burlington; 40°04′37″N 74°51′42″W	Burlington	This Gothic Revival style church was designed by Richard Upjohn and modeled after St. John's Church in Shottesbrooke, England
40	Abel and Mary Nicholson House	Abel and Mary Nicholson House	February 16, 2000 (#96001548)	Elsinboro Township; 39°31′10″N 75°29′11″W	Salem	A rare pristine example of a Delaware Valley patterned brick building
41	Old Barracks	Old Barracks	November 28, 1972 (#71000506)	Trenton; 40°13′12″N 74°46′07″W	Mercer	Only remaining colonial barracks, Hessian troops were captured here after George Washington crossed the Delaware River in December 1776.
42	Old Queens, Rutgers University	Old Queens, Rutgers University	May 11, 1976 (#76001164)	New Brunswick; 40°29′56″N 74°26′47″W	Middlesex	Oldest building at Rutgers University, fine example of Federal architecture on a college campus
43	Palisades Interstate Park	Palisades Interstate Park	January 12, 1965 (#66000890)	West bank of Hudson River; 41°00′11″N 73°54′58″W	Bergen, NJ, Rockland, NY, and Orange, NY	A joint New York and New Jersey organization, it includes 24 parks and eight historic sites, covering over 100,000 acres (405 km^{2}) along more than 20 miles (32 km) of Hudson River shoreline. It also operates the Palisades Interstate Parkway, which travels through the park, along the Hudson River
44	Paulsdale	Paulsdale	December 4, 1991 (#89000774)	Mt Laurel; 39°57′24″N 74°55′50″W	Burlington	Birthplace and home of Alice Paul, a leader in the Women's suffrage movement
45	President's House	President's House	July 17, 1971 (#71000504)	Princeton; 40°20′57″N 74°39′37″W	Mercer	John Witherspoon lived in this home for the President of the College of New Jersey (later Princeton University) between 1768 through 1779. During this time he also served as a delegate to the Continental Congress and signed the Declaration of Independence
46	Princeton Battlefield	Princeton Battlefield	January 20, 1961 (#66000466)	Princeton; 40°19′54″N 74°40′32″W	Mercer	After the Battle of the Assunpink Creek, the Continental Army, led by General George Washington, engaged the British here, leading to the British surrender on January 3, 1777
47	Prospect	Prospect	February 4, 1985 (#85002434)	Princeton; 40°20′50″N 74°39′24″W	Mercer	A fine example of John Notman's architecture. It formerly served as the official home of the President of Princeton University, and is now the faculty club. Woodrow Wilson lived from 1902 to 1910, prior to entering politics.
48^{†}	Radburn	Radburn	April 5, 2005 (#75001118)	Fair Lawn; 40°56′33″N 74°06′59″W	Bergen	An early planned community which aimed to separate traffic by transportation mode. It introduced the residential superblock.
49	Red Bank Battlefield	Red Bank Battlefield	November 28, 1972 (#72000796)	National Park; 39°52′17″N 75°11′22″W	Gloucester	Site of the Battle of Red Bank on October 22, 1777
50^{†}	Ringwood Manor	Ringwood Manor	November 13, 1966 (#66000471)	Ringwood; 41°08′20″N 74°15′19″W	Passaic	Manor of ironmaster Robert Erskine, who served George Washington here.
51	Sandy Hook Light	Sandy Hook Light	January 29, 1964 (#66000468)	Sandy Hook; 40°27′42″N 74°00′07″W	Monmouth	The oldest working lighthouse in the United States
52	Seabright Lawn Tennis and Cricket Club	Seabright Lawn Tennis and Cricket Club	October 5, 1992 (#91000883)	Rumson; 40°21′59″N 73°59′01″W	Monmouth	One of the oldest active tennis clubs in the United States
53	Shadow Lawn	Shadow Lawn	February 4, 1985 (#78001780)	West Long Branch; 40°16′46″N 74°00′19″W	Monmouth	Palatial home built for the president of the F.W. Woolworth Company. Now Woodrow Wilson Hall, part of Monmouth University.
54	The Speedwell Village Factory	The Speedwell Village Factory	May 30, 1974 (#74001186)	Morristown; 40°47′50″N 74°28′51″W	Morris	Birthplace of the electric telegraph.
55	Elizabeth Cady Stanton House	Elizabeth Cady Stanton House	May 15, 1975 (#75001122)	Tenafly; 40°55′33″N 73°57′16″W	Bergen	Home of Elizabeth Cady Stanton from 1868 to 1887.
56	William Trent House	William Trent House	April 15, 1970 (#70000388)	Trenton; 40°12′46″N 74°45′58″W	Mercer	Home of William Trent, founder of Trenton, New Jersey, and also home to several Governors of New Jersey
57	Washington's Crossing	Washington's Crossing	January 20, 1961 (#66000650)	Titusville, NJ and Yardley, PA; 40°19′52″N 74°51′49″W	Mercer, NJ and Bucks, PA	New Jersey location of George Washington's crossing of the Delaware River leading up to the Battle of Trenton on December 26, 1776, includes Washington Crossing Historic Park in Pennsylvania
58	Walt Whitman House	Walt Whitman House	December 29, 1962 (#66000461)	Camden; 39°56′33″N 75°07′26″W	Camden	The final residence of poet Walt Whitman

== Historic areas in the United States National Park System ==
National Historic Sites, National Historic Parks, National Memorials, and certain other areas listed in the National Park system are historic landmarks of national importance that are highly protected already, often before the inauguration of the NHL program in 1960, and are often not also named NHLs per se. There are four of these in New Jersey. The National Park Service lists these three together with the NHLs in the state, These are:

	Landmark name	Image	Date established	Location	County	Description
1	Paterson Great Falls		November 7, 2011	Paterson	Passaic	A National Natural Landmark and site of mills and mill races originally developed by the Society of Useful Manufacture in late 1700s that are a Civil Engineering Landmark
2	Ellis Island (part of Statue of Liberty National Monument)		May 11, 1965	Jersey City	Hudson	Immigration processing depot from 1892 to 1954. A portion of Ellis Island is in New York.
3	Thomas Edison National Historical Park		September 5, 1962	West Orange	Essex	Inventor Thomas Alva Edison's laboratory and residence, Glenmont
4	Morristown National Historical Park	Home of Theodosia Ford in Morristown that served as the revolutionary military headquarters for George Washington during the winter of 1779-1780	March 2, 1933	Morristown	Morris	American Revolutionary War sites: Ford Mansion, Jockey Hollow, Fort Nonsense, and New Jersey Brigade Encampment Site

== See also ==
- List of National Historic Landmarks by state
- National Register of Historic Places listings in New Jersey
- List of National Natural Landmarks in New Jersey
