= William Notman (disambiguation) =

William Notman (1826–1891) was a Scottish-Canadian photographer and businessman.

William Notman may also refer to:

- William Notman (politician) (1805–1865), Canadian politician
- William Notman (architect) (1809–1893), Scottish architect
