= Church of the Messiah =

Church of the Messiah, or variants thereof, may refer to: (sorted by state, then city/town)

- Church of the Messiah, Birmingham, United Kingdom
- Church of the Messiah (Louisville, Kentucky), listed on the National Register of Historic Places (NRHP) in Jefferson County
- Episcopal Parish of the Messiah (Auburndale, Massachusetts)
- Church of the Messiah (St. Louis, Missouri), listed on the NRHP
- Church of the Messiah (Glens Falls, New York), an Episcopal church designed by John W. Summers, built between 1854 and 1865
- Church of the Messiah (New York City), New York, a demolished Unitarian church
- Church of the Messiah (Philadelphia, Pennsylvania), a demolished Episcopal church
- Church of the Messiah (Pulaski, Tennessee), listed on the NRHP in Giles County
- Church of the Messiah (Toronto)
- Church of the Messiah (Osun, Ile-Ife), Nigeria
- Church of the Messiah, a Latter Day Saint sect organized by George J. Adams (1811–1880)
- Sanuel J. May was pastor of the Unitarian Church of the Messiah of Syracuse, New York from 1845 until 1868
