= Maclean House =

Maclean House may refer to

== Academic Facilities ==
- the John Maclean House, formerly the President's House at Princeton University
- A dorm at the University of Chicago
