= Abel and Mary Nicholson House =

- U.S. National Register of Historic Places
- U.S. National Historic Landmark
- New Jersey Register of Historic Places
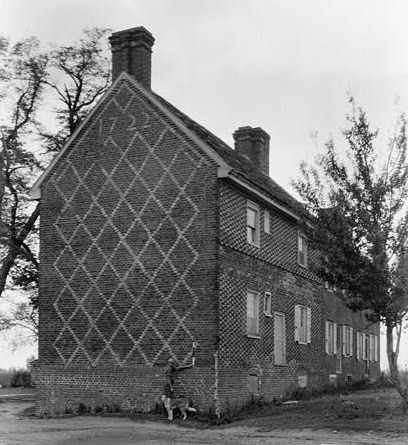
- The Able House, c.1936

- Location within Salem County, New Jersey Location within New Jersey Location within the United States
- Location: 127 Fort Elfsborg-Hancocks Bridge Road, Elsinboro Township
- Coordinates: 39°31′10″N 75°29′11″W
- Built: 1722
- Built by: William Petty; John Mason
- Architectural style: Georgian
- NRHP reference No.: 96001548
- NJRHP No.: 3437

Significant dates
- Added to NRHP: January 16, 1997
- Designated NHL: February 16, 2000
- Designated NJRHP: April 10, 1996

The Abel and Mary Nicholson House is brick house built in 1722 in Elsinboro Township, New Jersey, United States. It is an excellent example of a Delaware Valley patterned brick building. The vitrified bricks form geometric designs and highlight the year of construction. The building has not been significantly altered since it was built and has been receiving grants to help preserve it. It was designated a National Historic Landmark for its architecture in 2000

== History ==
Built by Abel Nicholson, a prosperous farmer, whose father had been among the earliest Quaker settlers along Lower Alloways Creek in the late 17th century. When completed, it was at a scale and with a level of detail that made it a mansion in relation to other dwellings of the period in the area. It's believed that the new home was built to replace a smaller wood-framed home built just after his father arrived in the later 1690s or early 1700s near the Alloway Creek, a tributary of the Delaware River.

The original building is a three bay, two-and-a-half story brick house, positioned on a high brick foundation with a gable roof, pierced by a brick chimney at both the east and west ends. Three walls of the structure are decorated above the basement level with a checkerboard pattern using vitrified brick, laid in Flemish bond. The fourth, east wall, displays English bond and the date 1722 in the gable. The 1722 date, centered in the gable above the diamond pattern, is made of vitrified headers and is seven courses high. Originally, the east wall was penetrated by two small windows on the southern side of the elevation, now closed up with brick, one on the second floor and one at the attic level.

The house remained in the family after Abel died in 1752, when the house and property were inherited by his son, John. In 1852 the farm was inherited by William Nelson from his father Davis Nelson. It is William who is believed to have constructed the brick addition and placed the date stone marked "1859" in the west end gable. The 1859 addition was two floors and included two bedrooms on the second floor and an enlarged kitchen, a large bricked fireplace, and a storage cellar.

A recent study of the house revealed clues about the original one-story wooden structure that previously abutted, and may have pre-dated, the 1722 dwelling, giving rise to speculation that the house was a three-room plan on the ground floor at the time of construction, implying that the hall, with its elaborate fireplace surround and other attributes, took on a more social or ceremonial function. Also found in the parlor is a writing closet, the strong evidence for which (a desk-like surface, bookshelves, windows to admit light, and ventilation grill) has been found in only two other examples in the Delaware Valley. Graeme Park near Horsham, PA, and the Pusey House near Avondale, PA, whose evidence is not as clearly defined as in the Nicholson example.

== See also ==
- National Register of Historic Places listings in Salem County, New Jersey
- List of National Historic Landmarks in New Jersey
