= Huguenot Springs, Virginia =

Unincorporated community in Virginia, US

Coordinates: 37°33′32″N 77°42′07″W

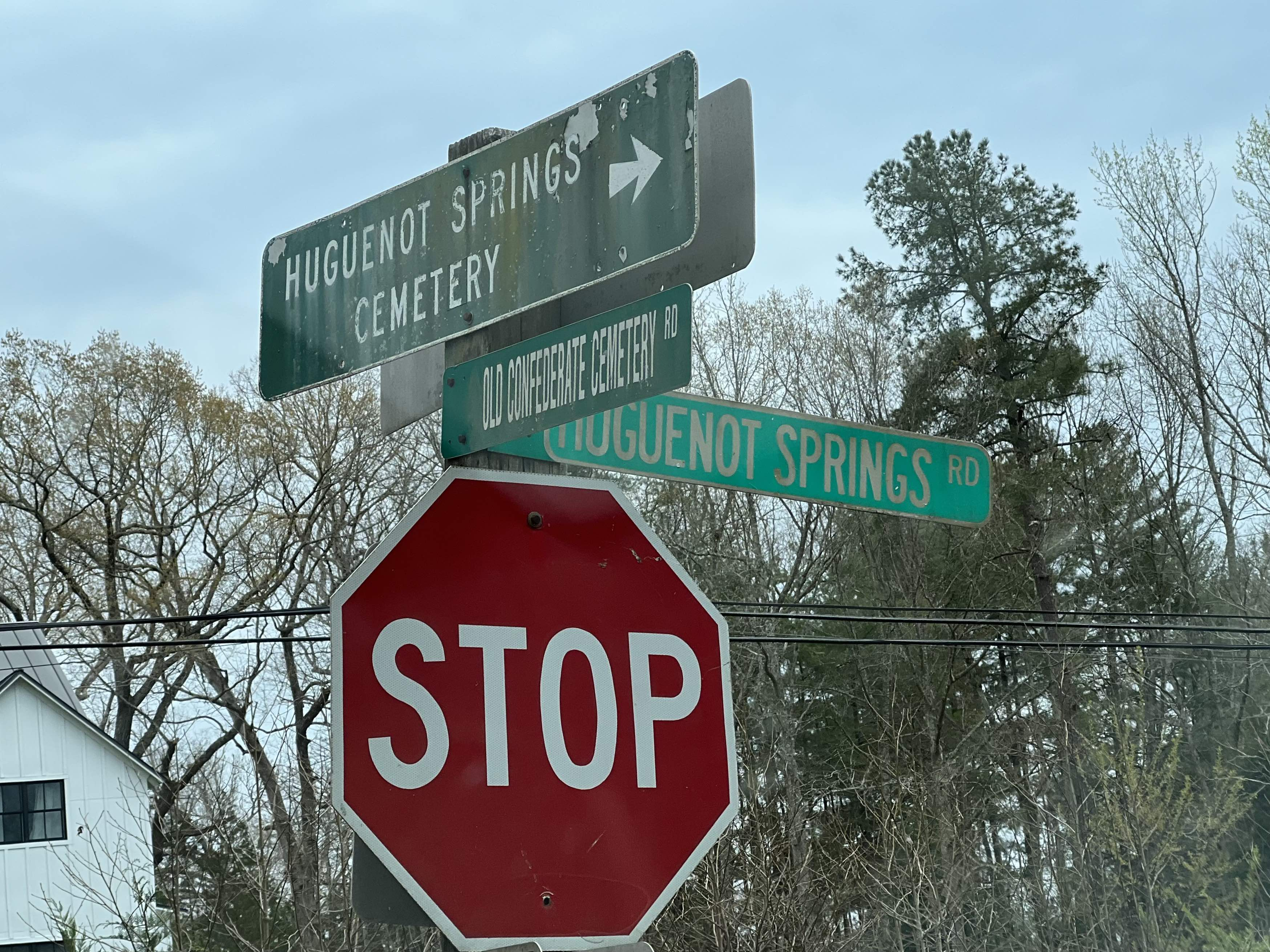
The intersection of Huguenot Springs Road and Old Confederate Cemetery Road.

Huguenot Springs is an unincorporated community in Powhatan County, in the U.S. state of Virginia. This community is bordered by Chesterfield County. People live on SR 607 (Huguenot Springs Road) and on other subdivision roads.

The Huguenot Springs community takes its name from the former Huguenot Springs Hotel Resort and Spa. It was initially planned by the two brothers Abraham S. and Archibald L. Wooldridge. They also owned the prosperous Midlothian Coal Mining Company, located five miles distant in Chesterfield County. A large three-story hotel was designed by architect John Notman. In addition to the hotel, multiple cottages were built to accommodate guests. Opened on July 1, 1847, the resort became very popular with the eastern Virginia planters and businessman, as before 1847, the nearest springs with a resort were located at least one hundred miles away in the western parts of the state. Huguenot Springs was only 17 miles away.

When the Civil War broke out, the hotel building was converted to a convalescent hospital for Confederate soldiers. Approximately 250 soldiers are buried in unmarked graves in the cemetery there. In 1890, the hotel burned down. Today, the only remains of the resort are the foundation of the hotel and the old cemetery. Visitors can visit the cemetery, accessible by Old Confederate Cemetery Road (SR 640).
