= Thomas Nast Home =

Historic house in New Jersey, United States

- U.S. National Register of Historic Places
- U.S. National Historic Landmark
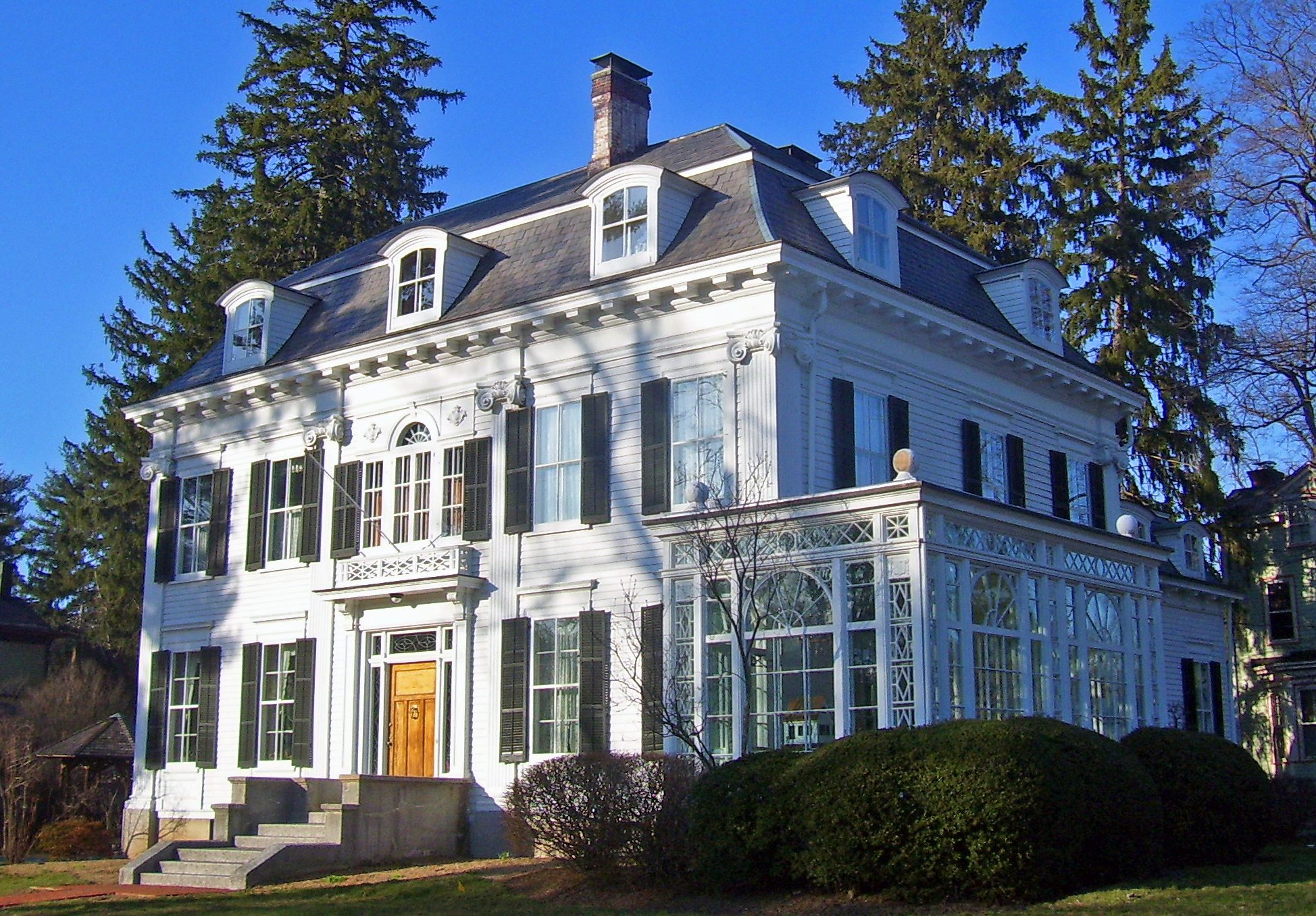
- Front elevation and east profile, 2008

- Location within Morris County, New Jersey Location within New Jersey Location within the United States
- Location: Morristown, NJ
- Coordinates: 40°47′30″N 74°28′52″W
- Area: less than one acre
- Built: 1860
- Architectural style: Second Empire
- NRHP reference No.: 66000470

Significant dates
- Added to NRHP: October 15, 1966
- Designated NHL: January 29, 1964

The Thomas Nast Home, also known as Villa Fontana, is a historic house on MacCulloch Avenue in Morristown, Morris County, New Jersey, United States. Built in 1860–1861, it was the home of political cartoonist Thomas Nast (1840–1902) from 1871 until shortly before his death. Nast is best known for his caricatures, published in Harpers Weekly, in which he created or popularized now-iconic images, including typical American depictions of Santa Claus, the Democratic Donkey, and the Republican Elephant. The house was named a National Historic Landmark in 1964 and placed on the National Register of Historic Places in 1966.

== Description and history ==
The Thomas Nast House stands in a mainly residential area south of downtown Morristown, at the northern corner of MacCulloch Avenue and Miller Street. It is a 2 1/2-story wood-frame structure, with a mansard roof and clapboarded exterior. It is a fine example of Second Empire architecture, with pilastered corners, bracketed cornice, and curved-roof dormers in the attic level. The interior of the house retains many features dating to the period of Thomas Nast's occupation.

Thomas Nast was born in Landau, Germany, and emigrated to the United States with his parents in the late 1840s. By the age of fifteen he was employed as an artist by magazines, and he began producing drawings for Harpers Weekly in 1862. It was during his tenure there that he produced many of his most iconic caricatures and depictions, including the Republican elephant, the Democratic donkey, and the many representations of Boss Tweed and Tammany Hall, whose downfall his work contributed to. Nast did much of his work in one of the upstairs bedrooms of this house. Due to declining interest in his work, he took a diplomatic post in Ecuador in 1902, dying not long after arrival there. Nast's work is not without historical controversy, due to his negative depictions of immigrants (particularly the Irish).

== See also ==
- List of National Historic Landmarks in New Jersey
- National Register of Historic Places listings in Morris County, New Jersey
