= Episcopal Parish of the Messiah =

Anglo-Catholic Episcopal parish in Auburndale, Newton, founded 1871

Coordinates: 42°20′41.67″N 71°14′27.59″W

The Episcopal Parish of the Messiah is a family-sized, Anglo-Catholic parish located in the village of Auburndale in Newton, Massachusetts, in the United States. Messiah is in the Charles River Deanery of the Episcopal Diocese of Massachusetts and the Episcopal Church in the United States of America. The parish was founded in 1871, and is located at the corner of Commonwealth Avenue and Auburn Street. The Rev. Devin McLachlan was the 12th rector of the parish. The Rev. James R. La Macchia is the current rector.

== History ==
The Church of the Messiah of West Newton and Auburndale ("parish" was informally adopted only in the 1980s) was officially organized in 1871 in West Newton although even back in 1856 unattached clergy led services from time to time for a small group of neighbors in West Newton. The parish ‘constitution’ adopted was November 6, 1871. The congregation purchased property in Auburndale in 1877, and built a chapel (now the parish hall) in 1881. The move to Auburndale was not without controversy; parish by-laws at one point stated that Messiah would always be in West Newton, but as with many small mission churches of the era, property prices were tantamount in choosing a location.

After 10 years of supply and rectors who left within 6 to 18 months, Messiah called the Rev. H.A. Metcalf in 1882. He served for 9 years and the parish bloomed for a time, but a debate over who was qualified to vote at annual meetings led to conflict. Metcalf resigned in 1891, two years after the fateful annual meeting.

Messiah went through a period of healing and new growth under their new rector, the Rev. John Matteson, and congregation begins the process of designing and building a sanctuary. The Rt. Rev. Phillips Brooks laid the cornerstone of the new church on October 3, 1892. American composer Horatio Parker, baptised at Messiah, composed the hymn tune "Auburndale" in celebration of the laying of the cornerstone of the new church building. His father, Charles Parker, had been the architect for the original chapel. Services begin the next year, and in 1907 the chapel is moved and attached to the church (now serving as a parish hall). After paying off the mortgage, Messiah was consecrated in 1909 by Bishop William Lawrence. The Rev. Harry Beal (later Missionary Bishop of the Panama Canal Zone) served as rector during World War I.

The Rev. Percival Matson Wood served as rector from 1917 to 1934. Wood was very active in youth leadership, organizing one of the first Young Peoples Fellowship groups in the Episcopal church. Commonwealth Avenue was extended by 1920, running right past the parish hall. Until that time, Auburn St. was the main street for the neighborhood and is the street Messiah's buildings are oriented to.

Messiah was destroyed by a fire on November 15, 1943. The cause is unknown, and the sanctuary burnt to the ground. A very few items, including the parish bell (given by Grace Church, Newton, in 1882) survived the fire, and donations come to the parish from around the nation. The Rev. Richard McClintock, rector from 1938 to 1951, led the parish through the challenge of rebuilding the church during wartime; he builds the current high altar himself just before the first Eucharist, out of wood that survive the fire. The rectory next door (sold in the late 1980s) is purchased a month before the fire (and is mortgaged to pay for the pipe organ). Messiah was rededicated by Bishop Sherrill on September 13, 1945.

The Rev. Frederick W. Rapp, formerly an assistant at St. Paul’s Cathedral (and a Baptist minister before then), served at Messiah during the post-war boom. A large parish hall (now rented as a daycare center) was built in 1952 with room for the basketball team, a stage, etc., and a Youth Director is hired. The Rev. Bob Golledge (later the vicar of Old North) served as rector from 1960 (at the age of 27) to 1971. It is in this period that Anglo-catholic liturgy begins to be more prevalent at Messiah. Once he left, a fair number of parishioners followed him to Old North.

The Rev. William C. Lowe was called as rector in 1971, at Messiah’s centennial, and served at Messiah through 2000. During Lowe’s tenure Messiah at first continued to thrive, but slowly entered a period of decreasing membership, particularly during the last 15 years. Yet, a fair number of the parishioners have joined since 2000. Lowe did a great deal of community outreach and organizing, and was well known for riding his motorcycle through town.

The rectory was sold in 1988, and Brookline Infant Toddler Center (BITC) began to rent the parish hall in 1998. Beginning in 1991, a local Alcoholics Anonymous Group began using the parish hall during the week for their meetings. In 2003, Paul West, a parishioner and former UCC minister, along with several others, began “Parishes in Partnership" and several local small churches joined PIP. Among them was Church of the Good Shepherd (Episcopal) in Watertown, Massachusetts, the church which sponsored Rev. McLachlan for ordination. Joint Lenten services took place on occasion with United Parish in Auburndale (UCC-UMC). Beginning around 2005 with the music ministry of Night Prayer, Cappella Clausura, a local early music ensemble, began using the church for rehearsing and holding their concerts. By 2011, the Parish of the Messiah began participating more and more in Charles River Deanery Events, such as the Lenten meditation series and joint Lenten services with other Episcopal parishes in Newton: Trinity Newton Center, Grace Newton Corner, St. Paul's Newton Highlands and St. John's Newtonville. At a Charles River Deanery Assembly held in September 2012, the Parish of Messiah was awarded a House of Mercy diocesan grant in support of its outreach ministry "Women and Children in Need," also known as "WIN," whose goal is to organize fundraising and outreach during key seasons in the liturgical and calendar year: Easter, Thanksgiving and Christmas.

After Lowe resigned in 2000, the parish relied upon supply priests, until the Rev. John Clarke was appointed priest-in-charge from 2001–2003, guiding Messiah through its transition and healing time, including the composition of a parish profile and the start of a search process. The Rev. Gareth Evans, followed by the Rev. Dr. Richard McCall, served as interims until the Rev. Devin McLachlan was called as rector in July, 2005. He served until his resignation in early 2011. A celebration of his ministry took place on March 6, his last day at Messiah. The Rev. Suzanne Colburn began serving as interim priest directly afterwards; her last day was Pentecost Sunday, May 27, 2012.

The parish celebrated its 140th anniversary on November 20, 2011, Christ the King Sunday, with a special Eucharist and singing of the hymn "Auburndale." The children of the parish found the cornerstone laid in 1944 by Henry Knox Sherrill, Bishop of the Diocese of Massachusetts, and Rev. Suzanne Colburn read from the dedication service. Bernie Jones, the Parish Historian and Melissa Leahy, the Parish Clerk, prepared an interactive exhibit in the parish hall which displayed the parish's history and Bernie Jones gave a talk during the sermon: "The Parish of the Messiah, Auburndale, Mass.: 140 Years of Answering God's Call, 1871-2011." The anniversary celebration was covered in the November 23, 2011 issue of the Newton Tab.

On August 8, 2012, the senior and junior wardens announced a recommendation that the Rev. James R. La Macchia be called to serve as the next rector. La Macchia accepted the call and began by presiding at the Eucharist on September 9, 2012.

In November of 2015, the parish merged with Trinity Parish, Newton Center.

== See also ==
- Church of the Messiah (disambiguation)
