= St. Thomas Episcopal Church (Glassboro, New Jersey) =

Historic church in New Jersey, United States

- U.S. National Register of Historic Places
- New Jersey Register of Historic Places
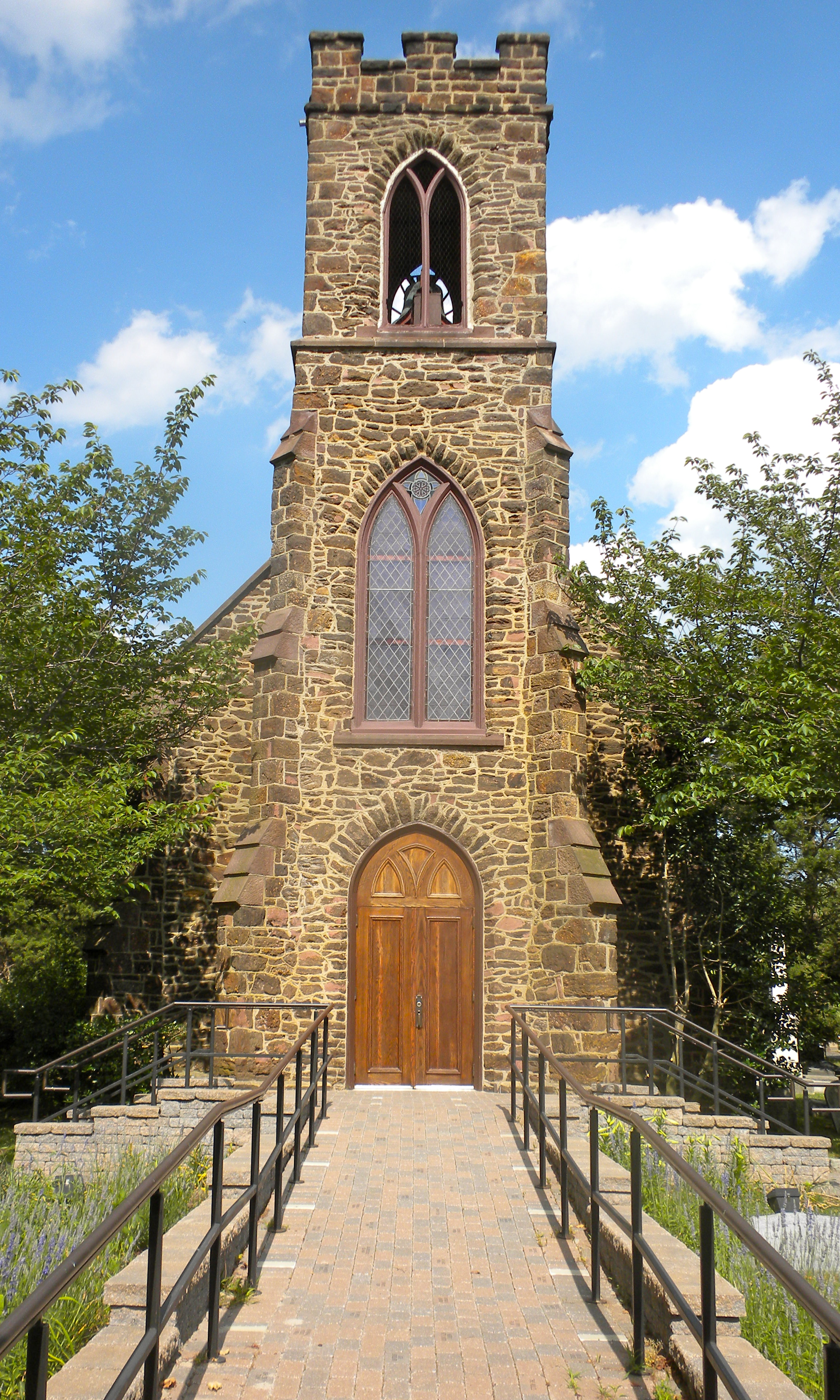
- St. Thomas Episcopal Church in Glassboro, New Jersey, June 2010

- Location within Gloucester County, New Jersey Location within New Jersey Location within the United States
- Location: Southeast corner of Main and Focer streets, Glassboro, New Jersey
- Coordinates: 39°42′28″N 75°6′38″W
- Area: 3 acres (1.2 ha)
- Built: 1846
- Architect: John Notman
- Architectural style: Gothic Revival
- NRHP reference No.: 75001137
- NJRHP No.: 1381

Significant dates
- Added to NRHP: March 3, 1975
- Designated NJRHP: January 14, 1972

St. Thomas Episcopal Church is a historic church located at the southeast corner of Main and Focer streets in the borough of Glassboro in Gloucester County, New Jersey. It was built in 1846 and documented by the Historic American Buildings Survey (HABS) in 1937, with an addendum in 1984. It added to the National Register of Historic Places on March 3, 1975, for its significance in architecture.

It is a parish of the Episcopal Diocese of New Jersey. The church reported 305 members in 2016 and 139 members in 2023; no membership statistics were reported nationally in 2024 parochial reports. Plate and pledge income reported for the congregation in 2024 was $215,638. Average Sunday attendance (ASA) in 2023 was 72 persons, down from a reported 115 in 2016.

== History and description ==
The church was built in 1846 featuring Gothic Revival architecture and designed by architect John Notman as one of his earliest projects. It was constructed using local ironstone and has an entry tower that is three stories high. The cornerstone was laid by Bishop George Washington Doane.

HABS photos from 1965

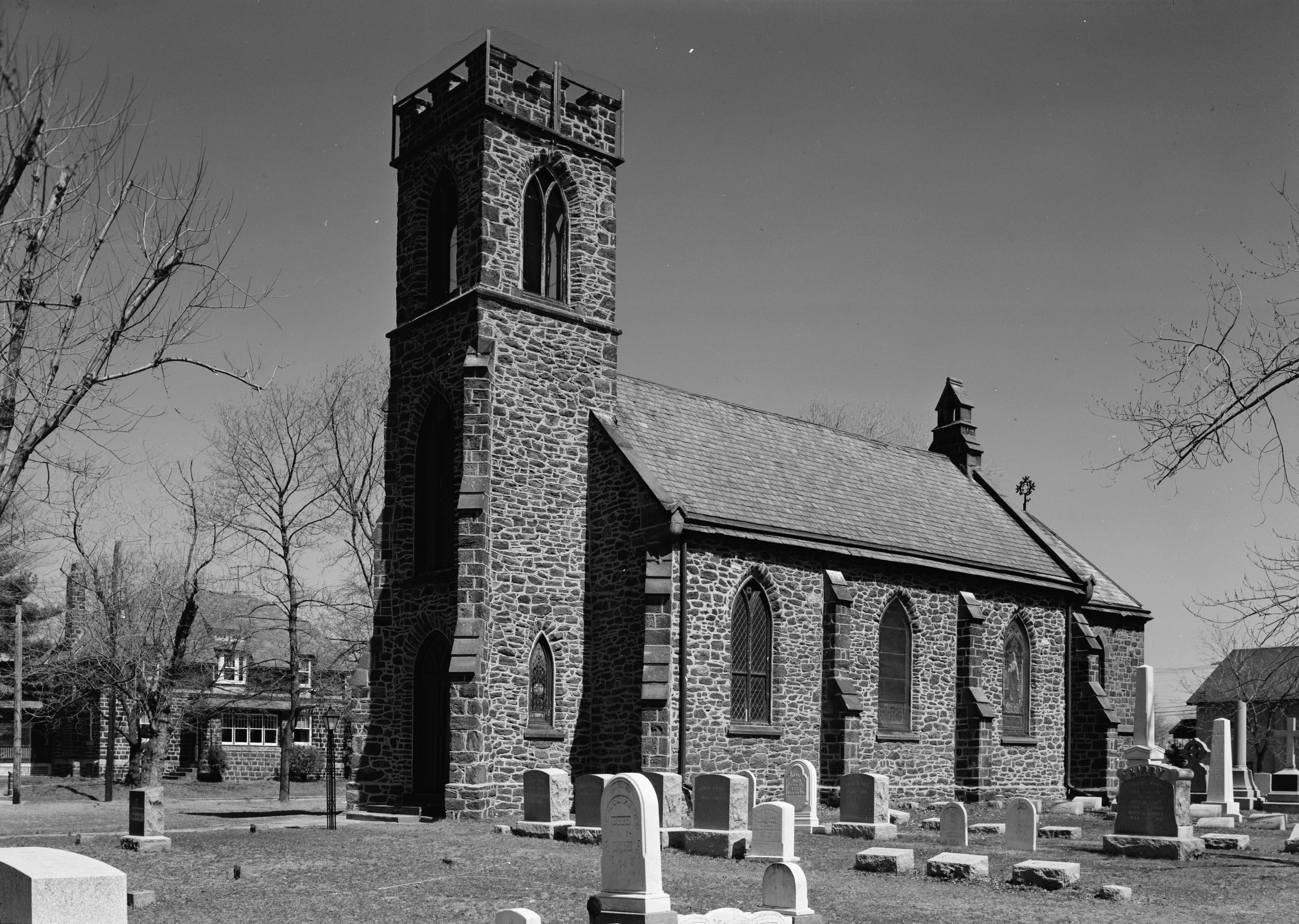
West front and south side

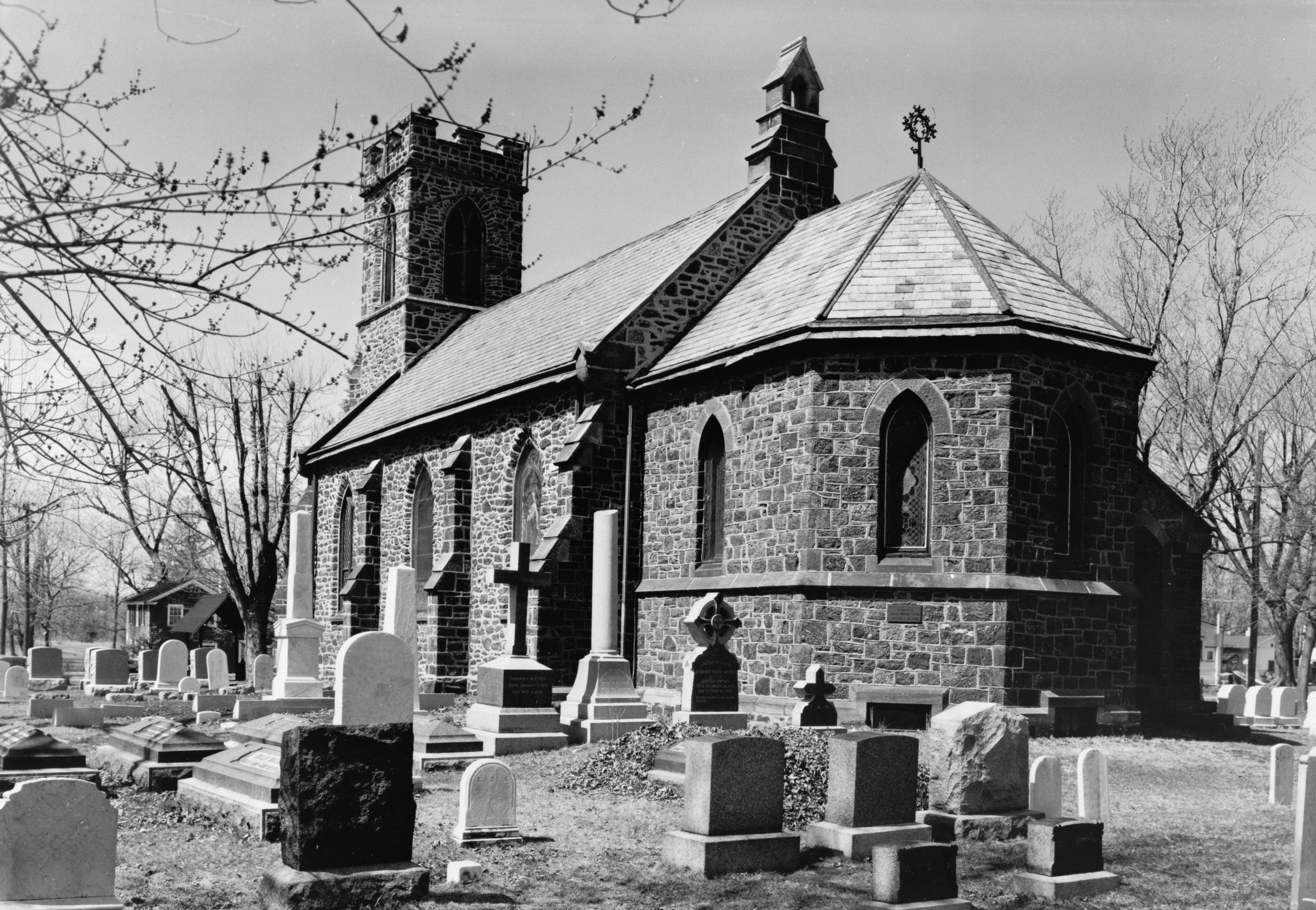
East rear and south side

== See also ==
- National Register of Historic Places listings in Gloucester County, New Jersey
