= Paul Tulane =

American philanthropist

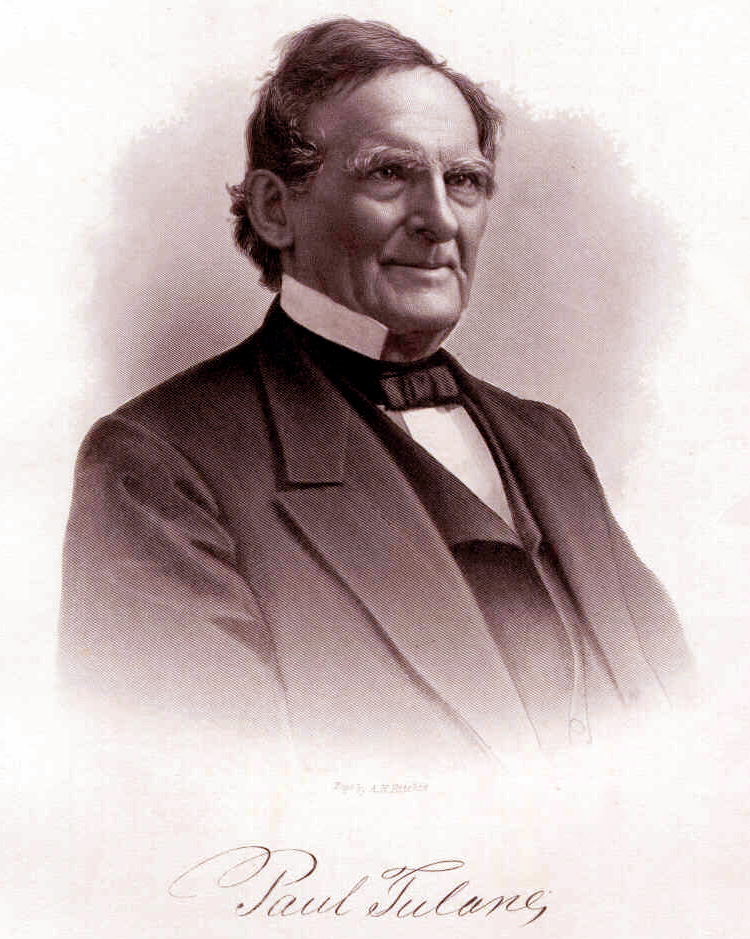
Paul Tulane

Paul Tulane (May 10, 1801 – March 27, 1887) was an American philanthropist and donor. Born in Cherry Valley, near Princeton, New Jersey, to a prominent French merchant family, Tulane made his fortune from a retail and dry goods company. Later, he became one of New Orleans' most prominent philanthropists supporting the Confederate States of America and the namesake of Tulane University, formerly known as the Medical College of Louisiana.

== Early life ==
Paul Tulane was the son of Louis Tulasne (deformed to "Tulane"), a French merchant based in the colony of Saint-Domingue who emigrated to the Cherry Valley, New Jersey following the Haitian Revolution. The Tulasne family occupied prominent legal and mercantile positions in France and its colonies before the French Revolution. Louis was baptized in Rillé by his uncle, Pierre Tulasne, and was a devout Catholic throughout his life.

Paul Tulane was educated in private schools, including Somerville Academy, in New Jersey, until the age of fifteen. He then worked briefly in a store in Princeton. From 1818, he spent three years traveling the Southern United States with his older brother Louis Stephen Tulane and his first cousin Paul Tulasne-Jaminière (1795, Rillé – 1830, Tours), a lawyer.

In 1840, Tulane and his father visited Rillé and the commercial ports of France. On observing the decadence of the foreign trade ports of Nantes and Bordeaux (his father had left Bordeaux in 1790) from slave revolts in the West Indies, he was convinced that a similar fate would befall New Orleans in the event of emancipation in the United States.

It was from his two tours that Tulane developed a keen interest in the economic, cultural, social, and educational development of New Orleans, and he ended up devoting his fortune to it, which was already $250,000 in 1840.

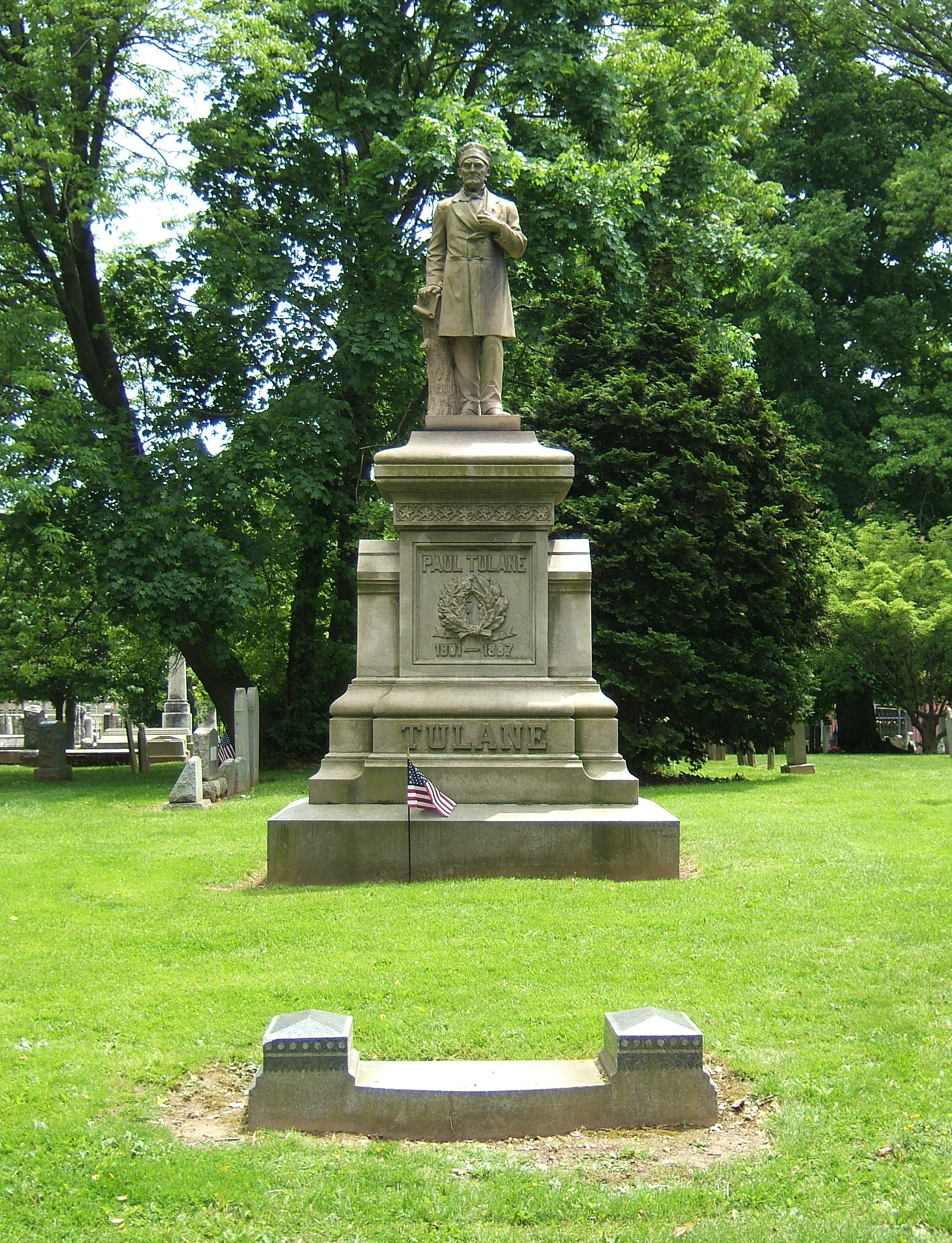
Tomb of Paul Tulane, Princeton Cemetery

== Career and philanthropy ==
In 1822, Tulane established Paul Tulane and Co. in New Orleans, a retail and wholesale dry goods and clothing business. Later, he invested in real estate in both New Orleans and New Jersey. By 1828, he had amassed a fortune of over $150,000. His business operated for nearly 40 years and retired with a large fortune in 1857.

Around that time, Tulane bought the John P. Stockton home in Princeton, now known as the Walter Lowrie House, where he subsequently resided. During the American Civil War, Tulane was the largest donor in New Orleans to the Confederate States of America, but the historian John D. Winters in Civil War in Louisiana (1963) does not provide the amount that Tulane contributed. He contributed $300 (1874 value) to erect a Confederate monument in Greenwood Cemetery. Tulane has been described as one of the most generous contributors to the Ladies' Benevolent Association of Louisiana, an institution dedicated to supporting widows and survivors of Civil War soldiers among other charitable goals.

For many years, Tulane gave liberally to the charitable institutions and Presbyterian churches of Princeton and New Orleans.

In 1882, he donated $363,000 (1882 value) to improve higher education in New Orleans. Tulane's Act of Donation ultimately resulted in the renaming of the University of Louisiana (founded as the Medical College of Louisiana) to the Tulane University of Louisiana in his honor and turned the once-public institution into a private one, the only such instance in United States history.

== Death ==
Tulane died near Princeton and is buried in the Princeton Cemetery on Witherspoon Street. In his honor, he has several streets named after him throughout the country, including Tulane Street in Princeton, and Tulane Avenue in New Orleans.

== Sources ==
- Depue, Opgden Mary (1915). Memorial Encyclopedia of New Jersey. Vol. 4.
- Dumas Malone (ed.). Dictionary of American Biography.
- John P. Dyer (1966). Tulane: The Biography of a University, 1834-1965.
- John Smith Kendall, "Paul Tulane," Louisiana Historical Quarterly, XX (1937).
- Hageman, John Frelinghuysen (1878). History of Princeton and its Institutions. Vol. 2. pp. 198–201.
- "Paul Tulane". A Dictionary of Louisiana Biography. Vol. 2. 1988. pp. 799–800.
- Collier's New Encyclopedia (1921).
- transcription of transfer documents - departmental archives of Indre et Loire, France.
