= Maybury Hill =

Historic house in New Jersey, United States

- U.S. National Register of Historic Places
- U.S. National Historic Landmark
- New Jersey Register of Historic Places
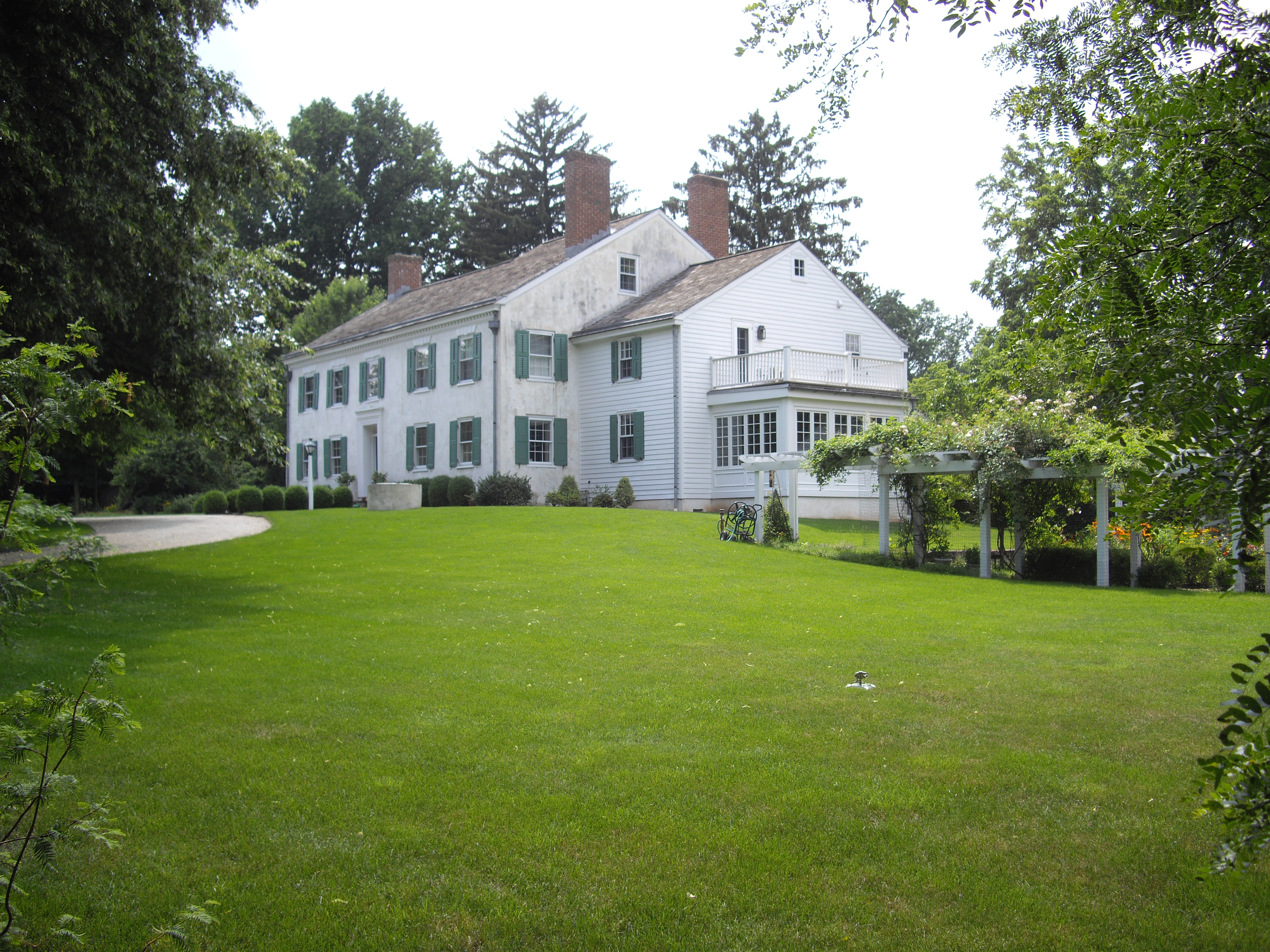

- Location within Mercer County, New Jersey Location within New Jersey Location within the United States
- Location: 346 Snowden Lane, Princeton, New Jersey
- Coordinates: 40°22′03″N 74°38′29″W
- Area: 9.6 acres (3.9 ha)
- Built: c. 1725
- Architectural style: Georgian
- NRHP reference No.: 71000502
- NJRHP No.: 1748

Significant dates
- Added to NRHP: November 11, 1971
- Designated NHL: November 11, 1971
- Designated NJRHP: November 11, 1971

Maybury Hill is a historic house at 346 Snowden Lane, in Princeton, Mercer County, New Jersey, United States. Built about 1725, it was the birthplace and boyhood home of Joseph Hewes (1730-1779), a signer of the United States Declaration of Independence. The house, an architecturally excellent example of Georgian domestic architecture, was designated a National Historic Landmark in 1971 for its association with Hewes. It is a private residence not open to the public.

== Description and history ==
Maybury Hill is located in a residential setting of northern Princeton, on the west side of Snowden Lane between Maybury Hill Road and Overbrook Drive. It is a 2 1/2-story masonry structure, with woodframe ells to the side and rear. It is built out of fieldstone which was finished in the 20th century in concrete, and is covered by a gabled roof. It has brick chimneys at each gable end. The interior follows a typical central hall plan, with a staircase rising in the main hall, a parlor to the left extending the full depth of the main block, and a dining room and kitchen to the right. Original features in these rooms include exposed beams and wooden paneling, and a tiled fireplace in the dining room.

The house was built about 1725, originally as a single block with a detached kitchen structure. Damaged by fire, it was reconstructed in 1735. In 1753 an ell was added, joining the main block to the kitchen and giving the house its overall L shape. It was leased by Arron Hewes between 1730 and 1755, and it is there where his son Joseph Hewes was born in 1730. Educated at Princeton, Hewes entered business and politics in Edenton, North Carolina, operating a mercantile business and serving in the North Carolina colonial legislature. During the American Revolution he served in the Continental Congress, and signed the United States Declaration of Independence. He died in Philadelphia in 1779 while serving in Congress.

== See also ==
- National Register of Historic Places listings in Mercer County, New Jersey
