= Prospect House (Princeton, New Jersey) =

- U.S. National Register of Historic Places
- U.S. National Historic Landmark
- U.S. Historic district – Contributing property
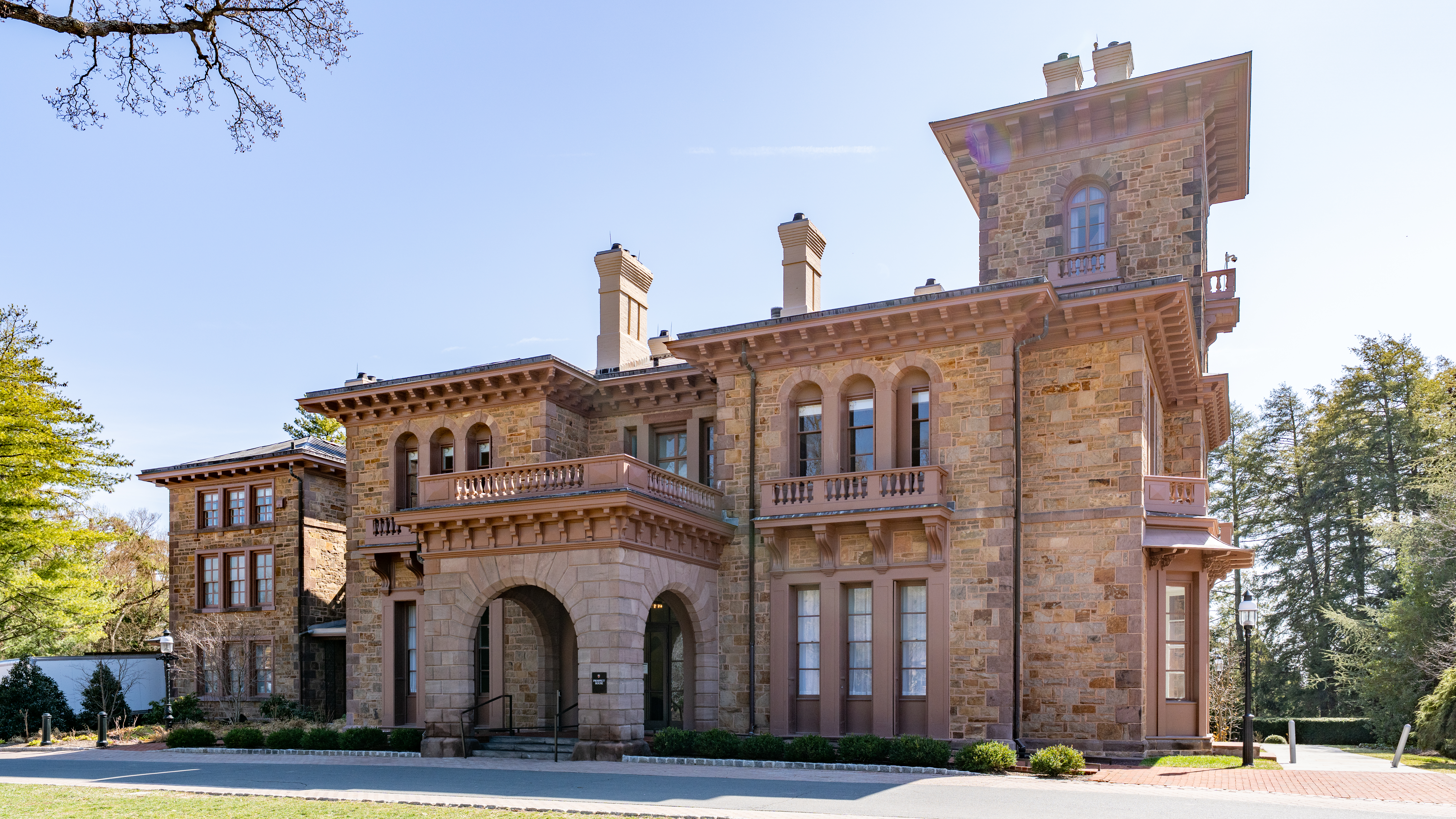

- Location within Mercer County, New Jersey Location within New Jersey Location within the United States
- Location: Princeton University campus, Princeton, New Jersey
- Coordinates: 40°20′48.95″N 74°39′24.37″W
- Area: 5 acres (2.0 ha)
- Built: 1851
- Architect: John Notman
- Architectural style: Italian Villa
- Part of: Princeton Historic District (ID75001143)
- NRHP reference No.: 85002434

Significant dates
- Added to NRHP: February 4, 1985
- Designated NHL: February 4, 1985
- Designated CP: June 27, 1975

Prospect House, known also as just Prospect, is a historic house on the Princeton University campus in Princeton, New Jersey, United States. Built in 1851, it is a fine example of the work of architect John Notman who helped popularize Italianate architecture in America. Notable residents include Woodrow Wilson during his tenure as president of the university. The building now serves as a faculty club. It was designated a National Historic Landmark in 1985 for its architecture and historic associations.

== Description and history ==
Prospect House stands on the Princeton University campus, between the Princeton University Art Museum and Washington Street. It stands on 5 acres (2.0 ha) of landscaped grounds that are a remnant of a once-larger estate. The house is a two-story stone structure, built out of rustically cut sandstone, with a three-story tower at one end, and a single-story service wing. The roofs are low-pitch hip roofs, with broad eaves decorated with brackets. The main facade has a central stone porte-cochere topped by a balustrade. Flanking this are slightly projecting bays, featuring matching second-story balconies. A modern dining room addition, designed by Warren Platner, extends to the rear.

Prospect House was built in 1851-52 for Thomas Fuller Potter. Prior to its construction, the site had been that of a farm whose house had hosted George Washington both during and after the American Revolutionary War. The new house was designed by John Notman, a Scottish architect based in Philadelphia who is credited with introducing the Italianate style of architecture to the United States.

In 1878, it was acquired by brothers Alexander and Robert Stuart, who gave it to the College of New Jersey, which became Princeton University and served as the house of the school president. Woodrow Wilson, the third Princeton president to live here, was resident from 1902 to 1911, when he became Governor of New Jersey en route to becoming President of the United States.

On February 10, 1913, Thomas J. Preston Jr., a professor of archeology at Princeton University, married Frances Folsom Cleveland, the widow of President Grover Cleveland at Prospect House.

In 1968, the president's official residence was moved to another house, and Prospect House was adapted for use as a private clubhouse for the university faculty.

It was designated a U.S. National Historic Landmark in 1985.

== Gallery ==
Sculpture

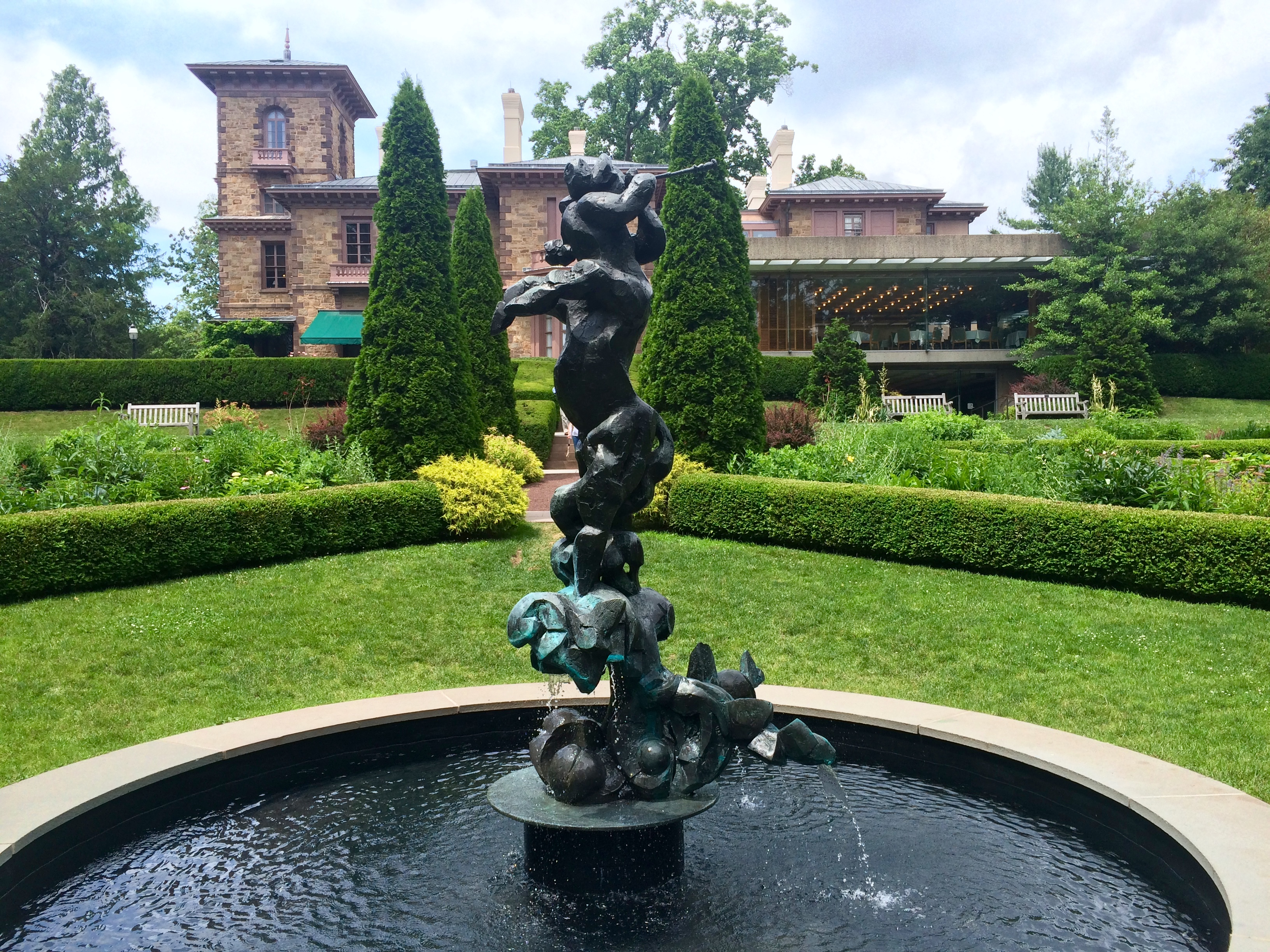
Centaur by Dimitri Hadzi (1954)

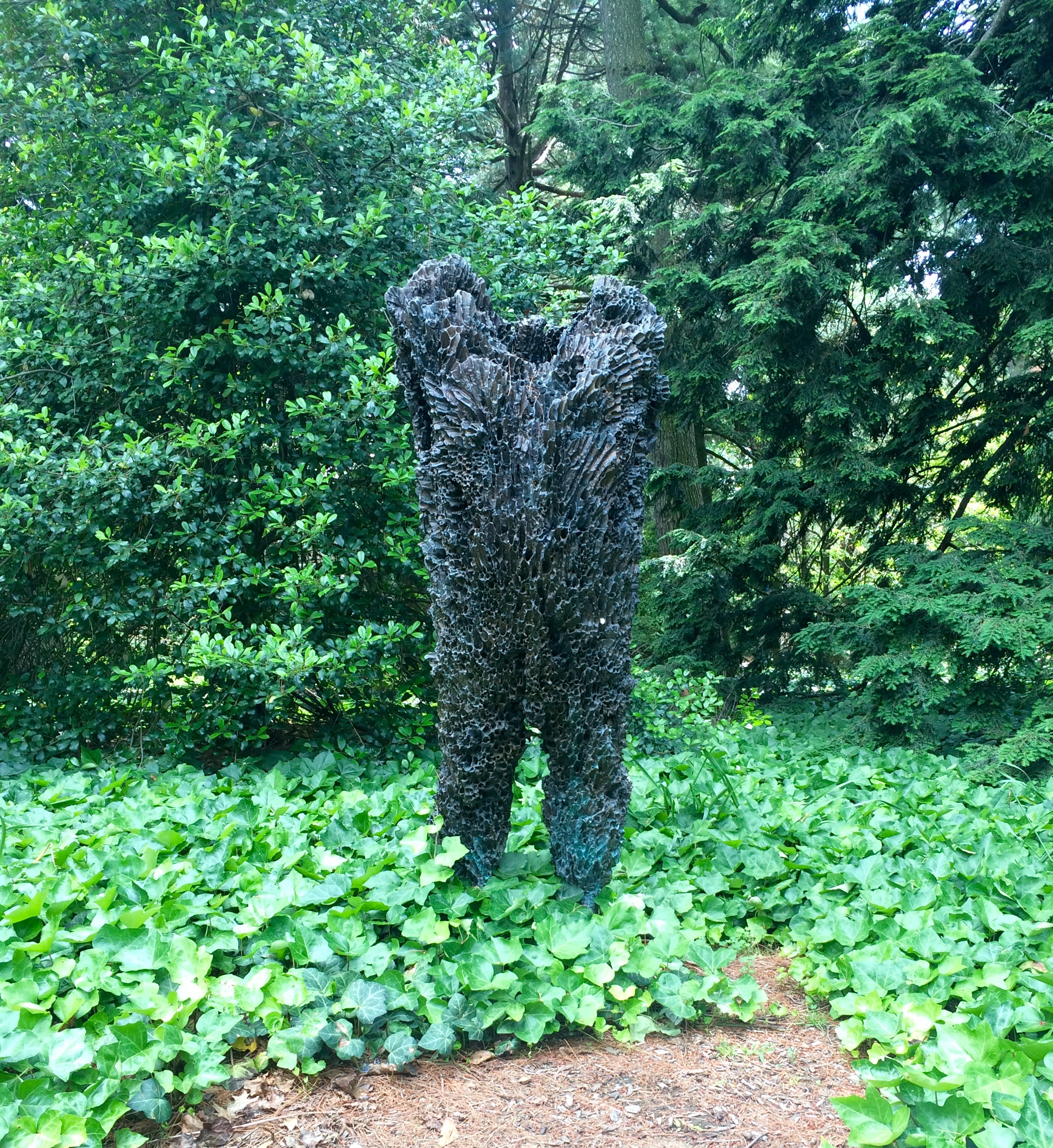
Titan by Michele Oka Doner (2004)
Garden

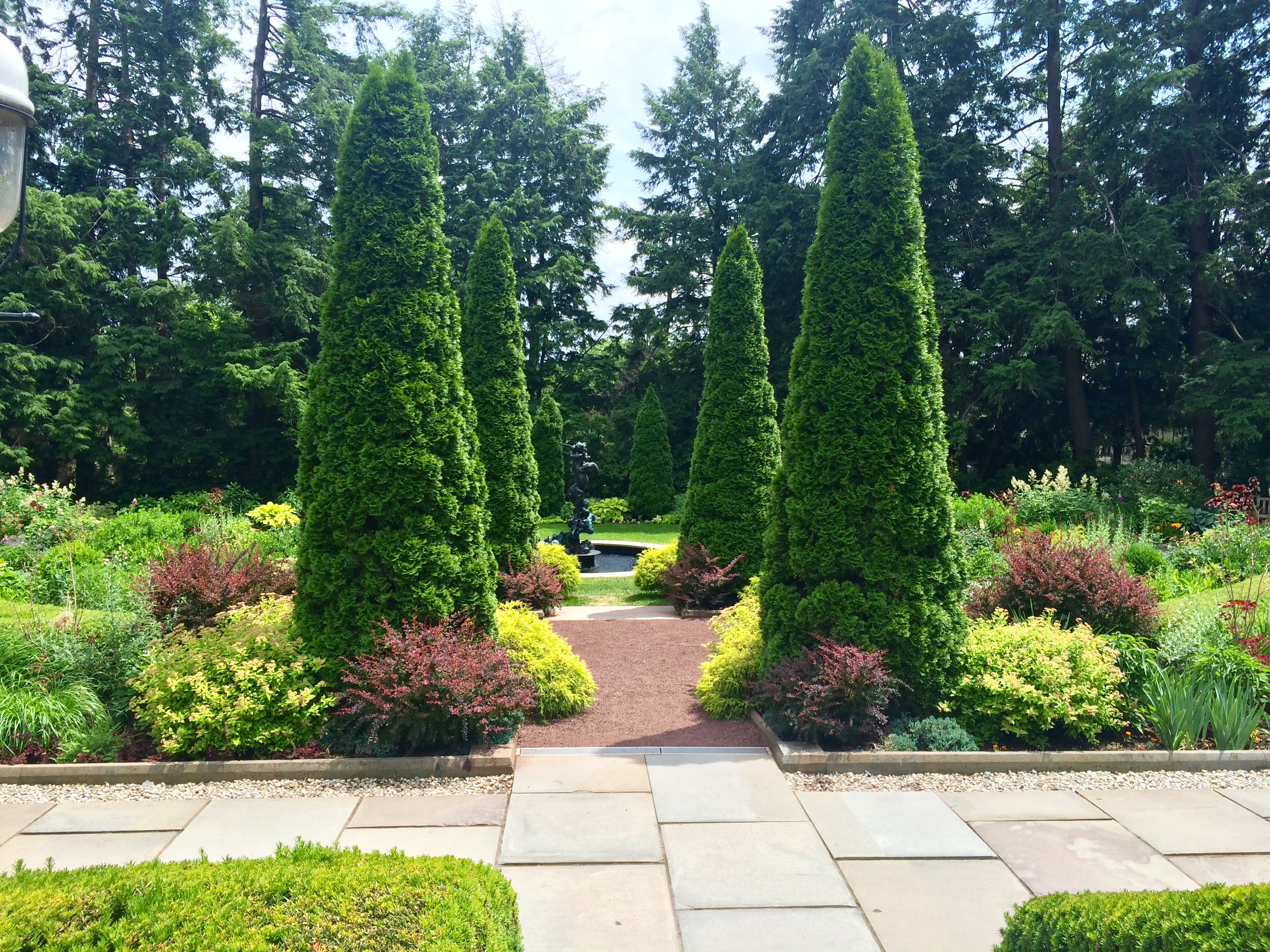
The garden from the house

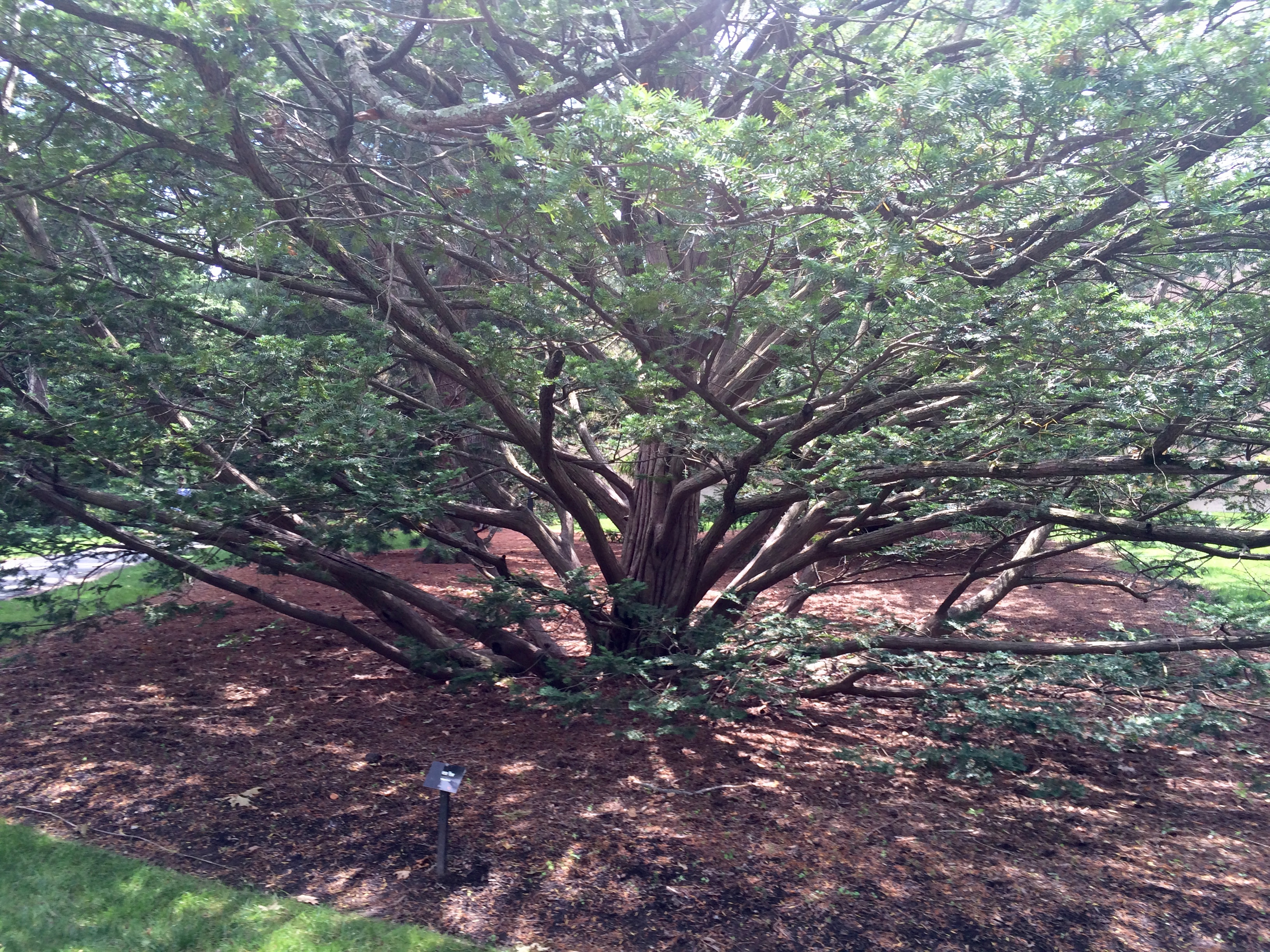
English yew tree

== See also ==
- List of National Historic Landmarks in New Jersey
- National Register of Historic Places listings in Mercer County, New Jersey
