= Church of the Messiah, Richmond =

Coordinates: 39.977133°N 75.117419°W

Church of the Messiah, Richmond (demolished)
- Church of the Messiah, Richmond (demolished)
- Location: Philadelphia, Pennsylvania
- Country: United States
- Denomination: Episcopal (former)

History
- Status: Demolished
- Founded: 1846
- Consecrated: April 23, 1848

Architecture
- Architect: John Notman
- Style: Gothic Revival
- Groundbreaking: June 28, 1847
- Construction cost: $6,200
- Demolished: 2016

Specifications
- Capacity: 605

Administration
- Diocese: Pennsylvania (1784)

The Church of the Messiah, Richmond, was an Episcopal congregation in the Port Richmond neighborhood of Philadelphia, Pennsylvania, in the United States. Founded in 1846, it merged with St. Matthew's Mission, Oxford Circle, 1929 to form Church of the Messiah, Oxford Circle. Its 1848 Gothic Revival building, designed by architect John Notman and located at 2640-2658 East Huntington Street, was demolished in 2016.

== History ==
The Church of the Messiah was organized on October 27, 1846, at the suggestion of the Rev. John Gordon Maxwell, a former rector of Emmanuel Church, Holmesburg. Rev. Maxwell had observed the lack of an Episcopal presence in the Richmond District of Philadelphia County. The parish was incorporated in 1847 and admitted to the convention of the Diocese of Pennsylvania on May 20, 1847. While awaiting the completion of its first house of worship, the congregation worshipped in a carpenter's shop owned by J. C. Richardson located at the northwest corner of York and Salmon Streets. The cornerstone of the congregation's building was laid June 28, 1847 at East Huntingdon and Thompson Streets. The property was donated by Dr. Benjamin S. and Mrs. Lynda O. Janney on April 14, 1847. The building, designed by architect John Notman, was consecrated on Easter Monday in 1848. The following day, the Gothic Revival style building was described in the Episcopal Recorder as an "early English order of Gothic architecture, which prevailed at the commencement of the 13th century; a style which well unites the elegant simplicity with economy... The church itself seats 605 persons, and can be made to accommodate more with ease; it is 60 feet high to the cap of the belfry, and the interior is 90 feet long along the chancel and nave and 64 feet along the transepts." The article identifies John Notman as the architect and Hiram Miller as the builder, and Notman's brother-in-law, John Gibson, is identified as the stained glass artisan. The building was erected at a total cost of $6,200 or $5,800 (not including the bell, furnace, and furnishings).

It was under the first rector,the Rev. Samuel Hazlehurst, the church came to serve an industrial landscape. Two blocks east of the church were the Reading Railroad Coal Wharves on the Delaware River and one block west was Aramingo Canal. Also in the immediate vicinity were John T. Lewis & Brothers Lead Works, Jefferson Flint Glass Works, Port Richmond Drain Pipe Works, and Philadelphia Foraging Works. And nearby was William Cramp & Sons Shipbuilding Company, the leading shipbuilder in the United States during the nineteenth century. The church grew through its early years. In 1870 the church expanded its property with the purchase of a lot on the northwest side from Bernard O'Rourke. In 1892, the church commissioned an addition by the firm of Hazlehurst & Huckel. The firm designed a three-story parish house immediately north of the church of brick with a brown freestone front. The same Trentonian brown freestone composes the older section and works well to blend the addition into the original church building. The cornerstone was laid on April 31, 1892. The building measuring twenty-nine feet by sixty-four feet included a gymnasium on the first floor, classrooms on the second floor, and an auditorium on the third floor. The building was erected at a total cost of $10,500. Also in 1892, $3,000 was spent to improve the property according to Hazlehurst & Huckel's plans. This included the installation of a new organ.

Four years later, the church celebrated its fiftieth anniversary. At that time, it was reported that the congregation had baptized 1,829 people and confirmed another 413. The Rev. C. L. Fulforth served the congregation for thirty-nine years, from 1890 until its closure in 1929. In 1929, Church of the Messiah merged with St. Matthew's Mission, Oxford Circle, which was organized by the Episcopal Diocese of Pennsylvania in September 1928. According to Church News, conditions which resulted in a dwindling congregation led to the decision to dispose of the Church of the Messiah property in Port Richmond. The neighborhood's ethnic makeup was in flux when the church was closed as Eastern European immigrants flooded Port Richmond. In fact, Church of the Messiah helped to incubate a Polish Episcopal congregation in 1917 by allowing the fledgling congregation to use its building. In 1932, the newly merged congregation, which was named Church of the Messiah, Oxford Circle, name, dedicated a new building at 6000 Large Street in the Lower Northeast. Fifteen memorial windows, chancel furniture (including the altar, pulpit, lectern, and font), and the organ from Church of the Messiah, Richmond were incorporated into this building. In March 1930, the rector, wardens, and vestrymen of Church of the Messiah transferred the property to The Church Foundation to facilitate the sale of the site. In June, the Foundation sold the site to the Austrian Seacoast Beneficial and Benevolent Society or Adriatic Club (Austrianskih Primorvec Društvo Zamjenite Pomoći I Dobročinstvo U Filadelfi) for $15,500.22. While the building was under consideration for historic designation, the building was hastily demolished in 2016.

== Leadership ==
=== Rectors ===
In the Episcopal Church in the United States of America, the rector is the priest elected to head a self-supporting parish.

- Rev. John Gordon Maxwell (1846-1847)
- The Rev. Samuel Hazlehurst (1847-1854)
- The Rev. Joel Rudderow (1854-1865)
- The Rev. Resse C. Evans (1866-1872)
- The Rev. Thomas Poole Hutchinson (1872-1873)
- The Rev. Jacob Miller (1873-1881)
- The Rev. Lucius N. Voight (1881-1883)
- The Rev. E. S. Widdemer (1883-1890)
- The Rev. C. L. Fulforth (1890-)
