= President's House (Princeton University) =

- U.S. National Register of Historic Places
- U.S. National Historic Landmark
- U.S. Historic district – Contributing property
- New Jersey Register of Historic Places
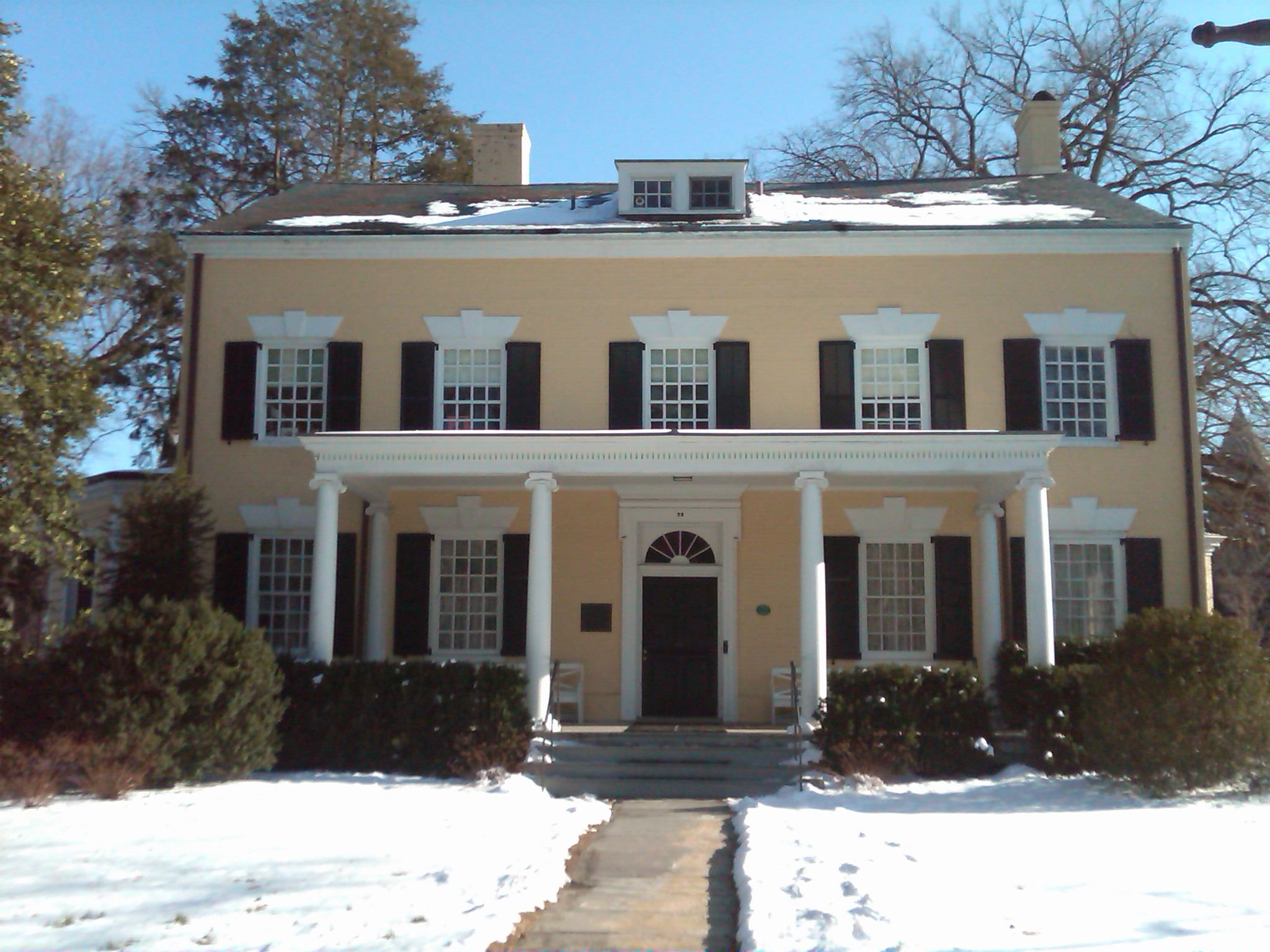

- Location within Mercer County, New Jersey Location within New Jersey Location within the United States
- Location: Princeton, New Jersey
- Coordinates: 40.34914372914301°N 74.66019829757528°W
- Built: 1756
- Architect: Robert Smith
- Architectural style: Georgian
- Part of: Princeton Historic District (ID75001143)
- NRHP reference No.: 71000504
- NJRHP No.: 1740

Significant dates
- Added to NRHP: July 17, 1971
- Designated NHL: July 17, 1971
- Designated CP: June 27, 1975
- Designated NJRHP: July 17, 1971

The President's House, also known as the John Maclean House, or simply the Maclean House, in Princeton, Mercer County, New Jersey, United States, was built to serve as the home of the President of the College of New Jersey, which later became Princeton University. It was completed in 1756, the same year as Nassau Hall. United States Founding Father John Witherspoon lived here from 1768 through 1779, during which time he served as a delegate to the Continental Congress and signed the Declaration of Independence. George Washington occupied Maclean House in January 1777, during the Battle of Princeton and in 1783 while Congress met in Nassau Hall.

It now serves as the home of the Alumni Association of Princeton University and houses over 20 staff, hosts many alumni functions and showcases Princeton memorabilia and a library of Princetoniana.

It was declared a National Historic Landmark in 1971.

== Slavery at the President's House ==
At least five Princeton presidents who occupied the President's House between 1756 and 1822 owned slaves who lived and worked in the house. These presidents included Aaron Burr Sr., Jonathan Edwards, Samuel Finley, Samuel Stanhope Smith, and Ashbel Green. Slaves lived in the quarters on the second floor of the detached "Kitchen House" to the rear of the main building.

After his death in 1766, Samuel Finley's personal property was auctioned off at the President's House. Advertisements for the estate sale described "two negro women, a negro man, and three Negro children" to be sold alongside livestock, furniture, and books.

In 2017, the Princeton University Art Museum, in collaboration with the Princeton & Slavery Project, commissioned American artist Titus Kaphar to create a public art piece in front of the President's House. His sculpture Impressions of Liberty, unveiled in November 2017, depicts the face of Samuel Finley in relief, along with the figures of enslaved people sold at the house after his death.

The President's House is the first stop on the Stories of African American Life at Princeton walking tour. The house also appears on the Princeton University Art Museum's mobile tour of Art and Slavery at Princeton.

== See also ==
- List of National Historic Landmarks in New Jersey
- National Register of Historic Places listings in Mercer County, New Jersey
