= William Notman (politician) =

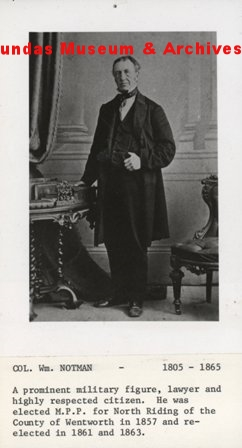
Col. William Notman

William Notman Q.C. (February 24, 1805 – September 19, 1865) was a lawyer and political figure in Canada West.

Notman was born in Scotland in 1805, studied at the University of Glasgow and came to Dundas in Upper Canada in 1821. He studied law with George Ridout in Toronto, was called to the bar in 1827 and set up practice in Ancaster. His first wife and family died of diphtheria in 1832. In 1835, he moved to Dundas, where he married Janet Wilson. Notman represented Middlesex in the Legislative Assembly of the Province of Canada from 1848 to 1851 and the North riding of Wentworth from 1858 to 1865. He also served as a lieutenant colonel in the local militia.
