= William Notman (architect) =

Scottish architect (1809-1893)

William Notman (1809-1893) was a 19th-century Scottish architect. Early work assisting Playfair focussed on country houses, but his later independent work was more commercial in nature.

== Life ==
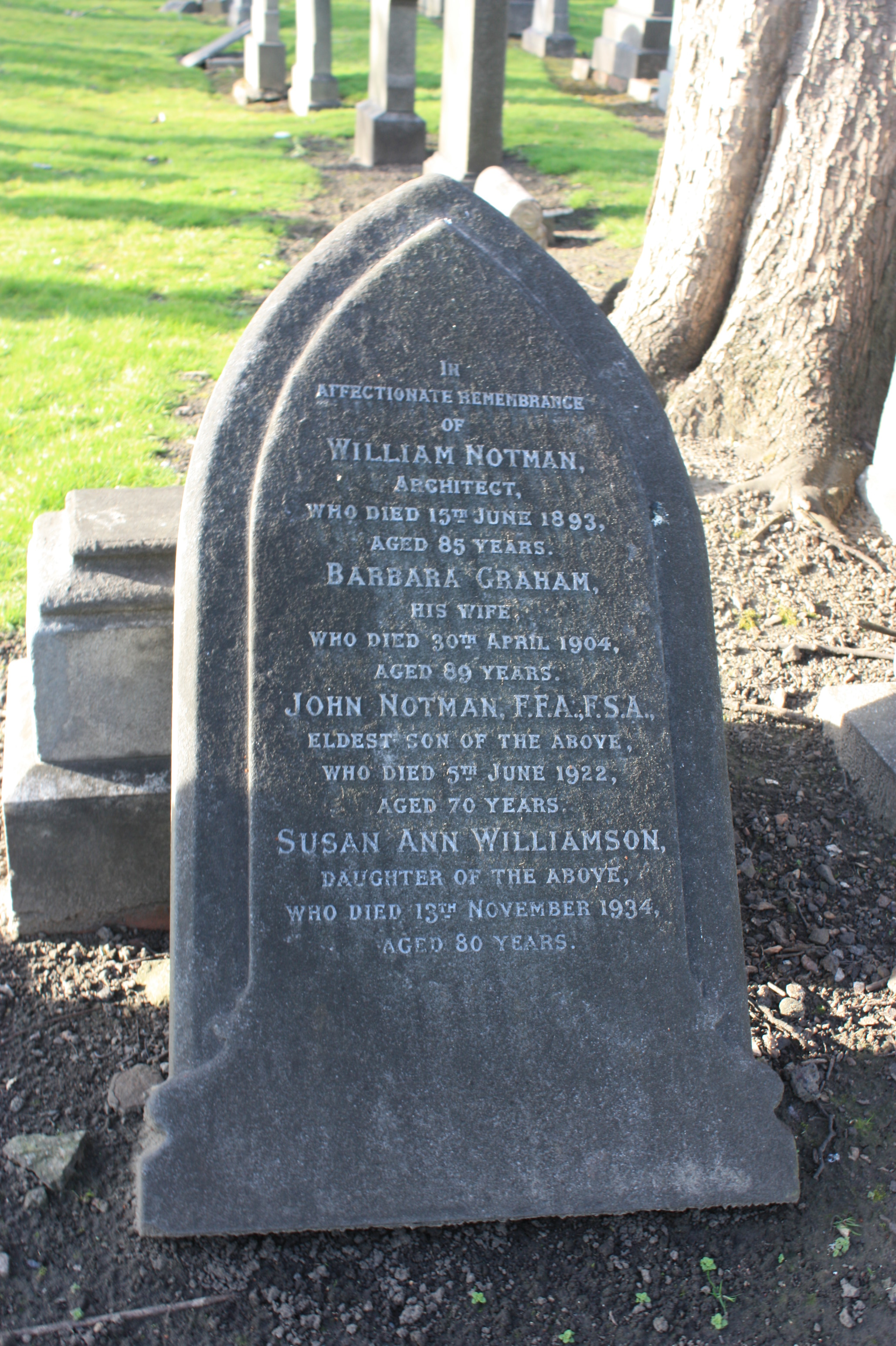
The grave of William Notman, Rosebank Cemetery, Edinburgh

He was born in the small village of Kirkurd in Peeblesshire in February 1809, the son of John Notman a clerk of works, and his wife Margaret Kemp. The family moved to Northfield Cottage on Newhaven Road west of Leith in the 1820s where he was articled to William Henry Playfair to train as an architect in 1823. His cousin, John Notman joined him a few years later (and emigrated to America). All Notman’s works until 1842 are under the umbrella of Playfair’s office.

Around 1850 he set up his own practice in Davidsons Mains on the western edge of Edinburgh.

He died in Northfield Cottage on 15 June 1893 and is buried in Rosebank Cemetery in north Edinburgh. The fallen stone lies near the centre of the graveyard on an infilled north-south path.

== Family ==
He was married to Barbara Graham (1814-1904). Their children included John Notman FFA FRA (1852-1922).

== Works ==
- Monument to Prof John Playfair on Calton Hill (1825)
- Minto Church and Manse (1827-1830)
- Drumbanagher House, County Armagh (1829), jointly with John Notman, demolished 1951 due to death duties
- Dalcrue Farmhouse, Perthshire (1832)
- Remodelling of the Royal Scottish Academy on Princes Street (1832)
- Sections of Lurgan House, County Armagh, Northern Ireland (1833)
- Remodelling the house of Andrew Rutherfurd, Lord Rutherfurd at 9 St Colme Street, Edinburgh (1835)
- Details at Spottiswoode House, Westruther (1834)
- Shop at 15 Princes Street, Edinburgh (1835) demolished
- Remodelling of Minto House and stables (1837)
- Details for Donaldson's Hospital (1842)
- Haymarket Mills in Edinburgh (1852)
- Caledonian Distillery, Edinburgh (1855)
- Wool Warehouse for W & F Wilson, Hawick (1856)
- Shopfront, 132 Princes Street, Edinburgh (1857)
- Villa (The Elms) in Greenhill, Edinburgh (1857)
- Tenement on India Place in Stockbridge, Edinburgh (1858) demolished
- Comiston Farmhouse (1859)
- Tenements on Barony Street (1859) taking over from the recently deceased Alexander Black
- Chemical Works for MacLean & Hope, Leith (1860)
- The “Star Inn” in Moffat (1860)
- Tenement on Montgomery Street off Leith Walk (1862)
- Tenement on Fort Street in Leith (1862)
- Alterations to Bernards Brewery in Edinburgh (1863)
- Corner block on Windsor Street/Montgomery Street (1863)
- Tenement on Maitland Street (1864)
- Villa (“Helen Grove”) on Park Road, Edinburgh for William Gifford (1872)
- Tenement on Grove Street (1877)
