= John Notman =

American architect (1810–1865)

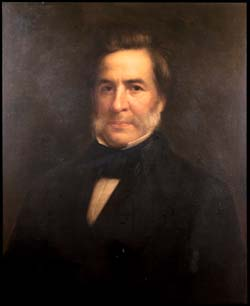
- An 1845 portrait of Notman by Samuel Waugh
- Born: July 22, 1803; Edinburgh, Scotland
- Died: March 3, 1865 (aged 61); Philadelphia, Pennsylvania, U.S.
- Resting place: Laurel Hill Cemetery, Philadelphia, Pennsylvania, U.S.
- Occupation: Architect

John Notman (July 22, 1803 – March 3, 1865) was a Scottish-born American architect and landscape architect based in Philadelphia. He designed buildings, cemeteries, churches and country estates in the Mid-Atlantic region of the United States and helped popularize Italianate architecture in the United States.

== Early life and education ==
Notman was born on July 22, 1810, in The Canongate district of Edinburgh, Scotland, to David and Mary (Christie) Notman. He spent much of his childhood in Lasswade, south of Edinburgh. He was educated at the Watt Institution in Edinburgh. He apprenticed for four years as a carpenter and built country houses in the Scottish highlands and Northern Ireland.

== Career ==
Sometime around 1824, Notman joined his older cousin, William Notman to train as an architect in the office of William Henry Playfair in Edinburgh prior to emigrating to the United States in 1831. He settled in Philadelphia and first appears in the city directory as a carpenter then as an architect. He returned to Scotland in 1833 to move his mother and siblings to America. He met John Jay Smith who helped him obtain a contract to construct a building for the Library Company of Philadelphia in 1835.

He was selected to design and build the Roman Doric gatehouse, landscaping, cottage and chapel at Laurel Hill Cemetery. Notman's design for Laurel Hill was selected over more experienced architects including William Strickland and Thomas Ustick Walter.

In the late 1830s, he was hired for landscape design at several country estates. His work at Nathan Dunn's estate, known as "The Cottage", in Mount Holly, New Jersey, drew acclaim from Andrew Jackson Downing. Other notable landscape design projects were completed for the estates of Richard Stockton Field, Joshua Francis Fisher, George Washington Doane and Jay Cooke.

He opened and operated a successful firm and was a founding member of the American Institute of Architects.

Notman is credited with introducing the Italianate style to America. His design for "Riverside," the house built in Burlington, New Jersey in 1839, for Bishop Doane, was the first Italianate villa built in the United States overlooking the Delaware River. The 1845 Athenaeum of Philadelphia was the first Italianate building in the city.

Many of his designs for churches were dictated by the ideas of the Cambridge Camden Society who suggested that Anglican churches of the Low church variety should be built in the Romanesque style, while those of the High church variety be built in the Gothic style. He was also briefly employed by the Roman Catholic Diocese of Philadelphia during construction of the Cathedral Basilica of Saints Peter and Paul until an argument over the terms of his contract resulted in his dismissal.

In 1845, Notman designed a three-stepped office wing addition to the north side of the New Jersey State House. Notman was also the architect of the highly influential New Jersey State Lunatic Asylum in Trenton, New Jersey of 1847. This building was the first example of the Kirkbride Plan in asylum design.

In 1848, Notman was selected to design the Hollywood Cemetery in Richmond, Virginia. The success of this project led to additional projects in Virginia including improvements to Richmond's Capitol Square.

In 1851, Notman designed the Prospect House and the Walter Lowrie House on the campus of Princeton University. He also designed and built Ivy Hall for Princeton University in 1847. In 1857, one of his last projects was the Italianate gatehouse at Mount Vernon Cemetery in Philadelphia, Pennsylvania.

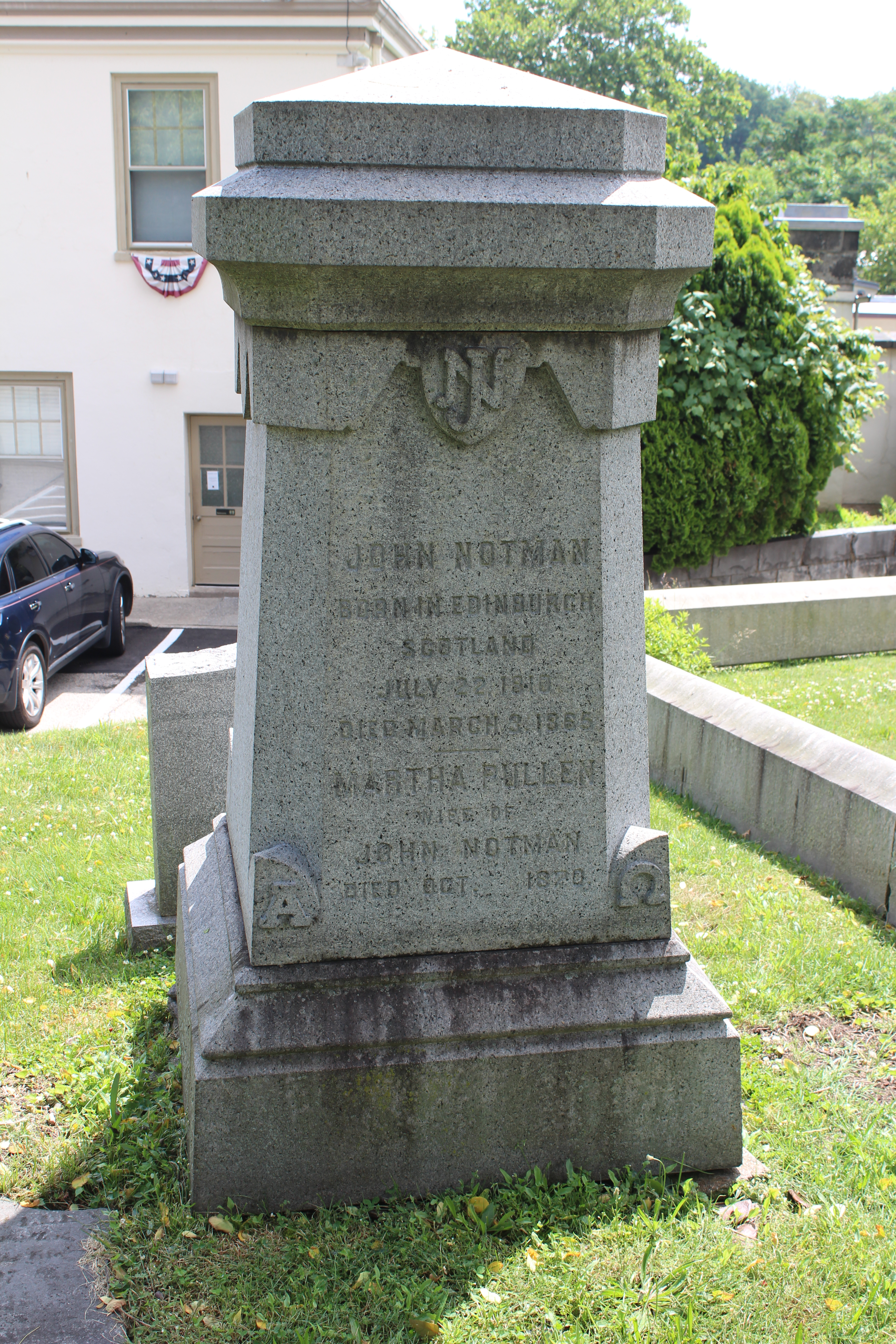
Notman's tombstone in Laurel Hill Cemetery

Notman died on October 3, 1865 and was interred at Laurel Hill Cemetery. His early death was reportedly accelerated by alcoholism. After his death, his architectural firm continued for several years under his protege George Hewitt. A plaque was added near his gravestone in 1998 when Laurel Hill was designated a National Historic Landmark. It reads:

"Laurel Hill stands as a landmark in American social and cultural history... an essay in the evolution of our nation's architecture, landscape design and funerary art."

== Personal life ==
He became a member of Saint Andrew's Society of Philadelphia in 1837. He was married to Martha (Pullen) Anners in 1841.

== Notable works ==
Buildings

- Athenaeum of Philadelphia, Philadelphia, Pennsylvania (1845)
- Office wing addition to the New Jersey State House, Trenton, New Jersey (1845)
- Huguenot Springs Hotel Resort and Spa, Huguenot Springs, Virginia (1847)
- Ivy Hall, Princeton, New Jersey (1847)
- New Jersey State Lunatic Asylum, Trenton, New Jersey (1847)
- Nassau Hall, Princeton, New Jersey (1855)

Cemeteries

- Laurel Hill Cemetery, Philadelphia, Pennsylvania (1836)
- Hollywood Cemetery, Richmond, Virginia (1849)
- Mount Vernon Cemetery gatehouse, Philadelphia, Pennsylvania (1858)

Churches

- St. Thomas Episcopal Church, Glassboro, New Jersey (1846)
- Church of the Messiah, Richmond, Philadelphia, Pennsylvania (1848)
- St. Mark's Church, Philadelphia, Pennsylvania (1849)
- Emmanuel Church, Cumberland, Maryland (1851)
- St. Peter's Church, Pittsburgh, Pennsylvania (1851)
- First Presbyterian Church of Chestnut Hill, Germantown Ave. and Rex Ave., Philadelphia, Pennsylvania (1852)
- The dome and facade of the Cathedral Basilica of Saints Peter and Paul, Philadelphia, Pennsylvania (1857)
- St. Clement's Church, Philadelphia, Pennsylvania (1855–59)
- Church of the Holy Trinity, Rittenhouse Square, Philadelphia, Pennsylvania (1856–59)

Houses

- Mansion House, Trenton, New Jersey (1848)
- Whitney Mansion, Glassboro, New Jersey (1849)
- Prospect House, Princeton, New Jersey (1851)
- Walter Lowrie House, Princeton, New Jersey (1851)

== Gallery ==
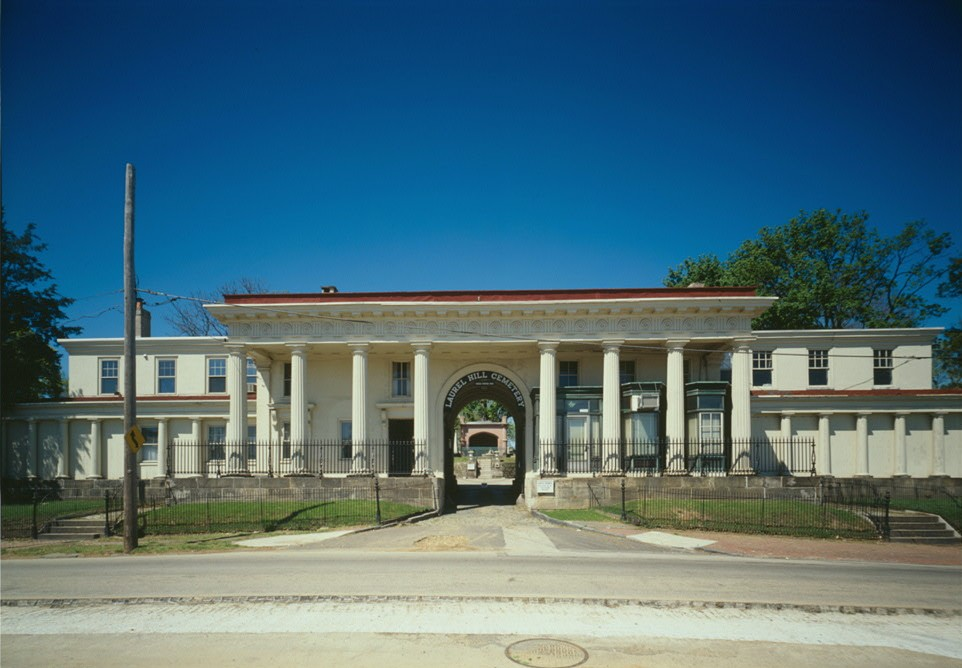
Laurel Hill Cemetery Gatehouse, 3822 Ridge Ave., Philadelphia (1835)

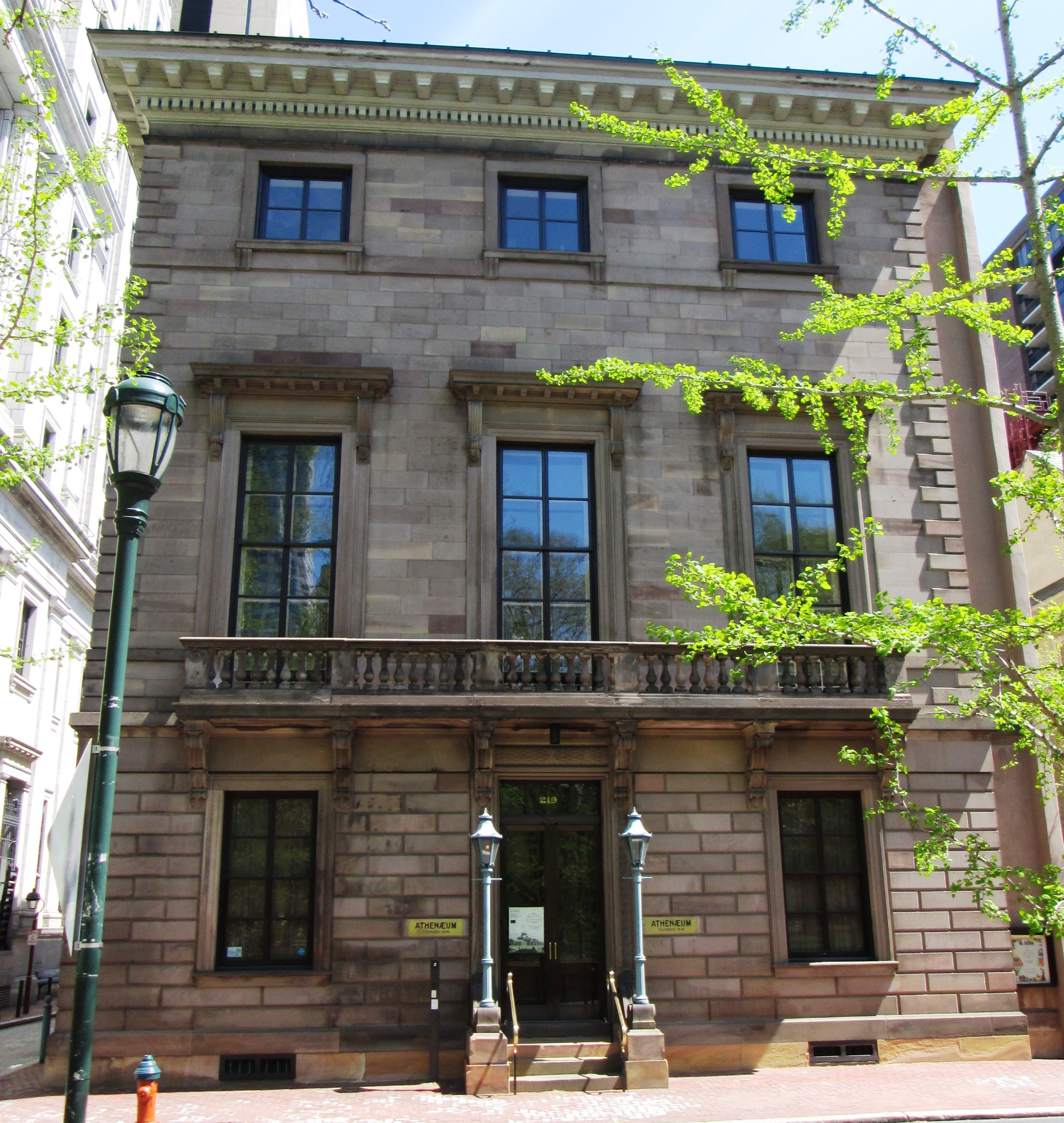
The Athenaeum of Philadelphia (1845) was the first Italianate Architecture style building built in Philadelphia

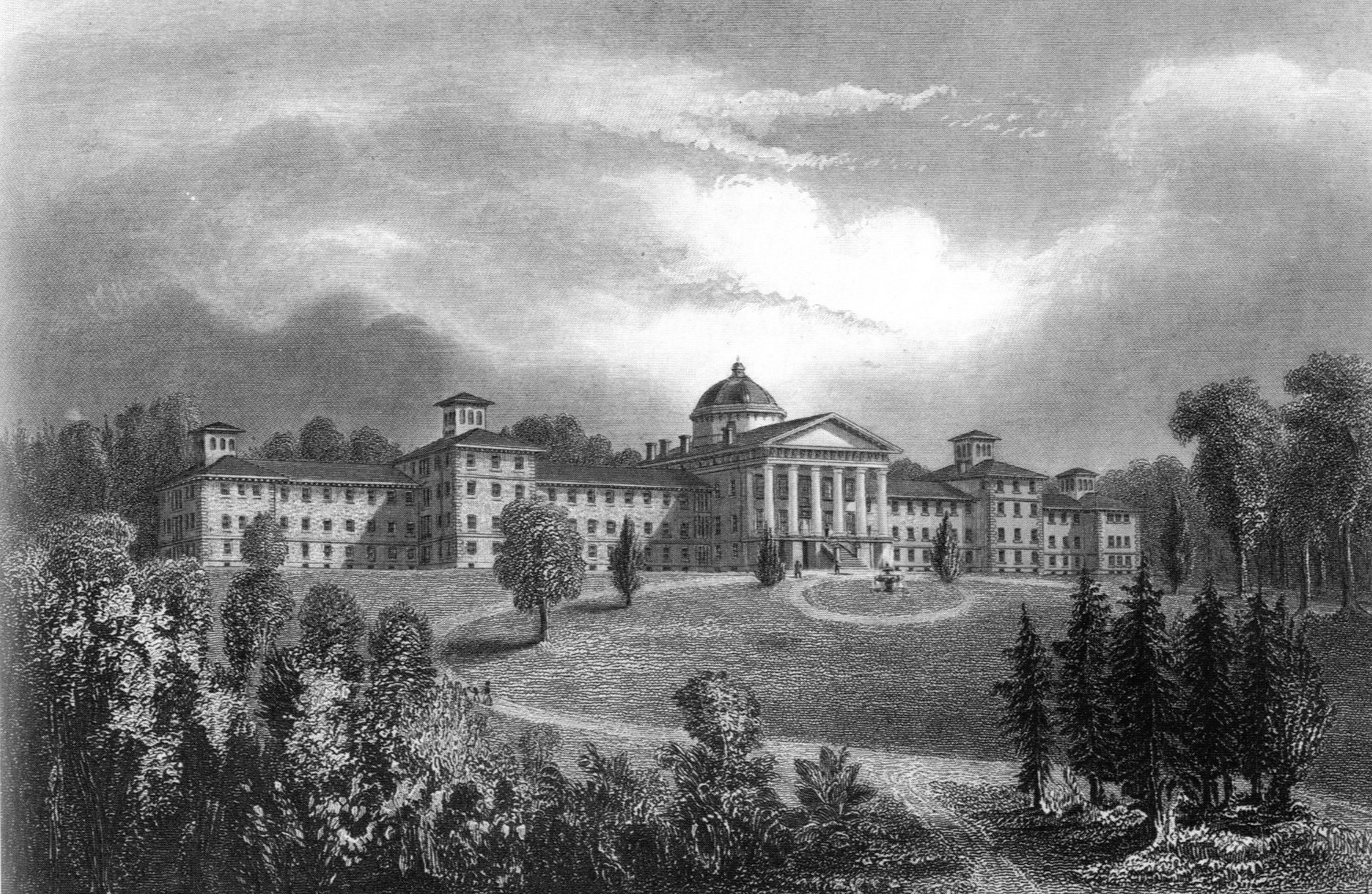
New Jersey State Lunatic Asylum, Trenton, New Jersey (1847)

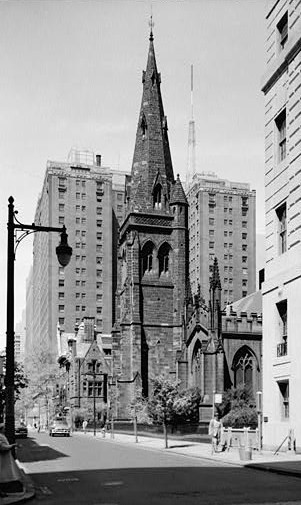
St. Mark's Church, 1625 Locust Street, Philadelphia (1849)

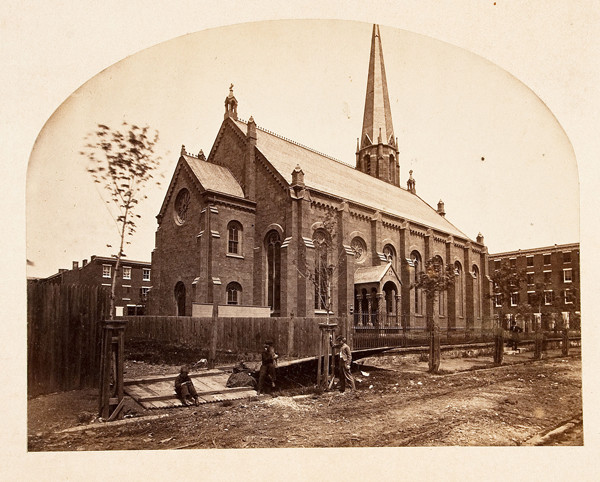
Saint Clement's Church in Philadelphia (1855–1859)

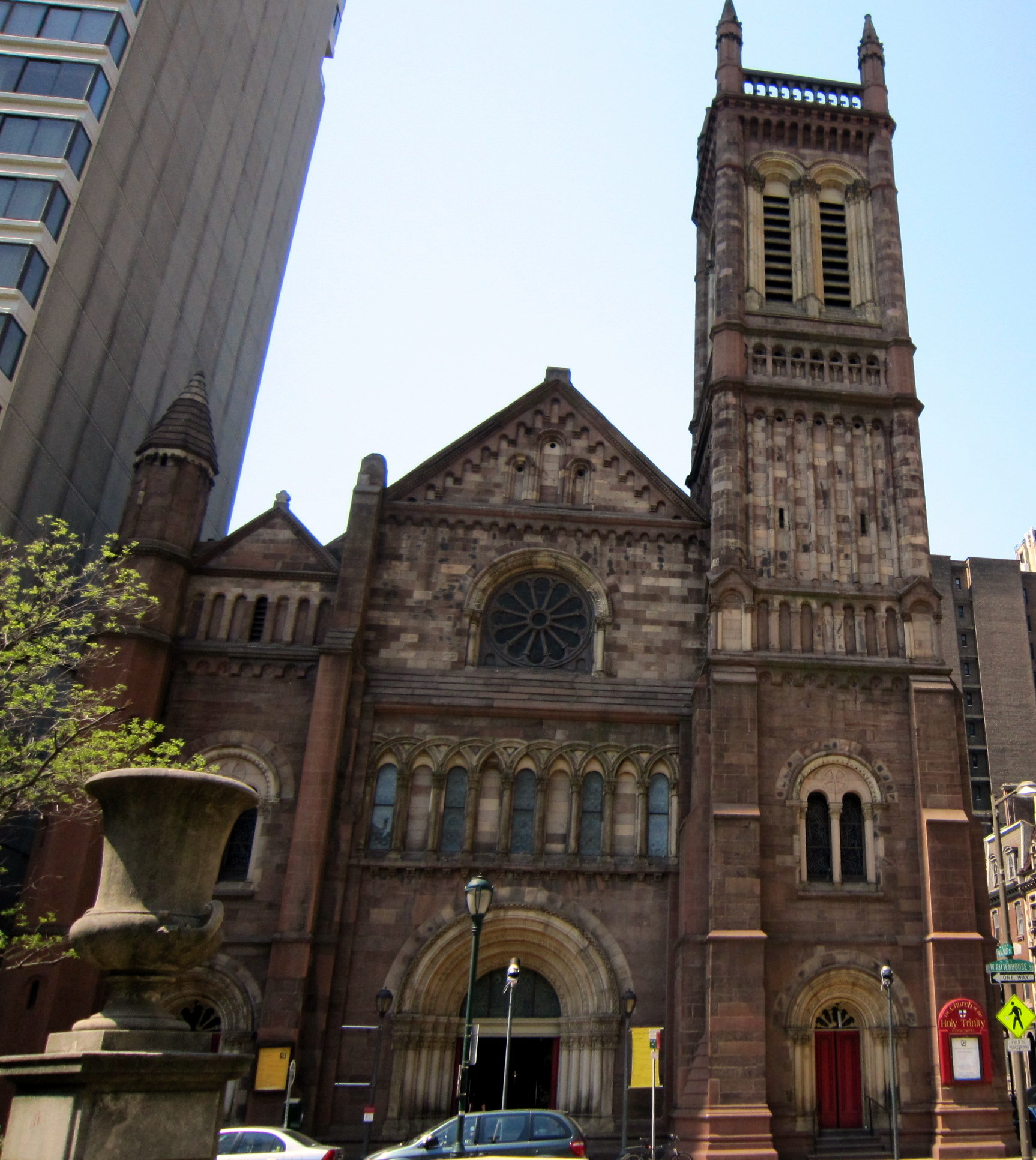
Church of the Holy Trinity, Rittenhouse Square, Philadelphia (1856–59).
