= Princeton Historic District (Princeton, New Jersey) =

Historic district in New Jersey, United States

- U.S. National Register of Historic Places
- U.S. Historic district
- New Jersey Register of Historic Places
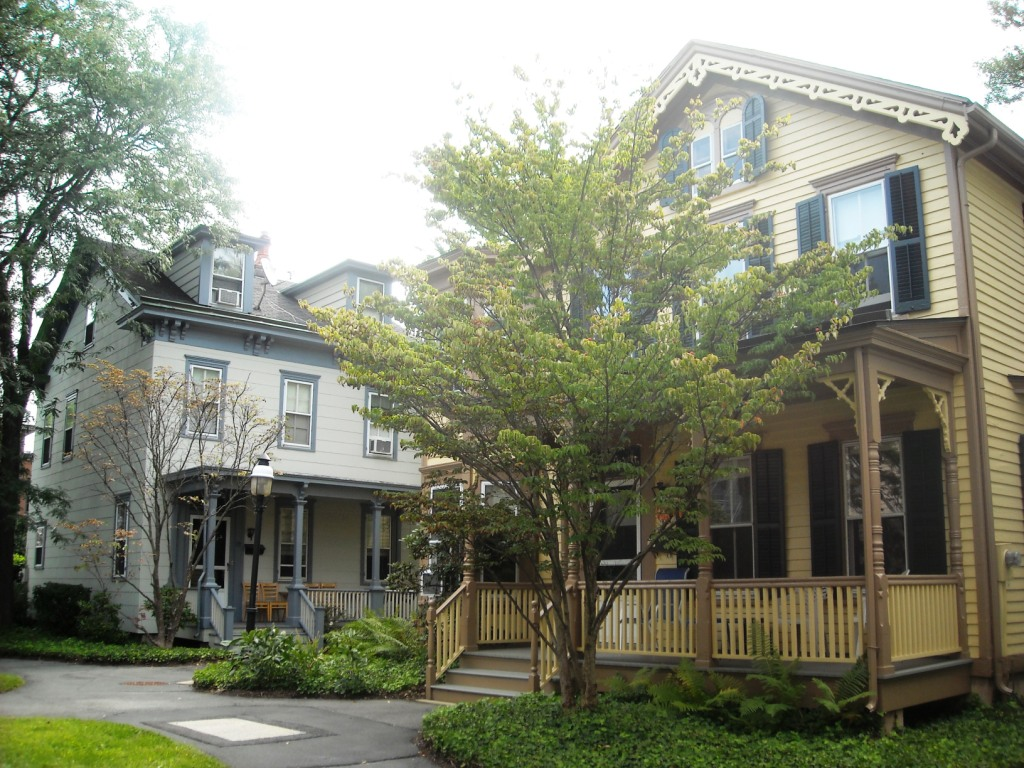
- Historic residential architecture in the district

- Location within Mercer County, New Jersey Location within New Jersey Location within the United States
- Location: Irregular pattern between Lytle St. and Haslet Ave. from Lovers Lane to Olden Sts., Princeton, New Jersey
- Coordinates: 40°20′55.4″N 74°39′33.6″W
- Area: 370 acres (150 ha)
- Built: 1756 (Nassau Hall)
- Architect: Multiple
- Architectural style: Mid-19th-Century Revival, Late Victorian, Colonial
- NRHP reference No.: 75001143
- NJRHP No.: 1741

Significant dates
- Added to NRHP: June 27, 1975
- Designated NJRHP: October 29, 1973

The Princeton Historic District is a 370-acre (150 ha) historic district located in Princeton, New Jersey that was listed on the U.S. National Register of Historic Places in 1975. It stretches from Marquand Park in the west to the Eating Clubs in the East, from the Princeton Cemetery in the north to the Graduate College in the south. The district encompasses the core parts of the campuses of the Princeton Theological Seminary and Princeton University. It also includes the business district centered on Nassau Street and many historic homes, both mansions in the western section and more humble dwellings in the Witherspoon/Jackson neighborhood. Notable churches within the district include Nassau Presbyterian Church, Trinity Episcopal, Nassau Christian Center, and the Princeton University Chapel. The district is home to seven of Princeton's nine, and New Jersey's fifty-eight, National Historic Landmarks, the largest concentration of such sites in the state.

== Significance ==
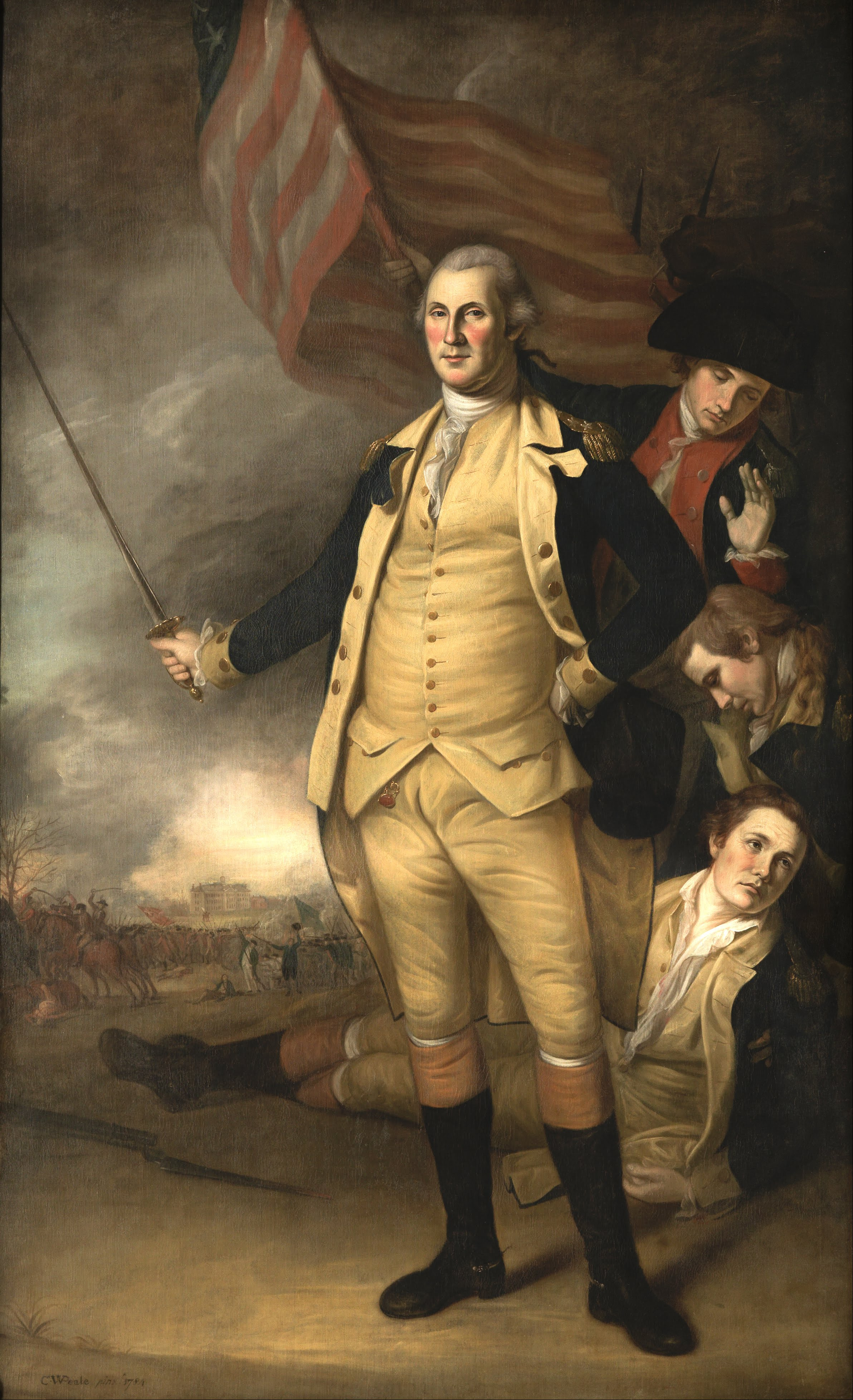
Charles Willson Peale, George Washington at the Battle of Princeton (1784), Princeton University Art Museum, showing Nassau Hall in the background

Princeton, and the University to which it is home, has played a significant role in 300 years of American history. Not only does the town have a strong architectural heritage, it has also made contributions to the world of politics, religion, science, and literature.

Princeton's first settlers came in the 1690s, with Quakers settling along the Stony Brook, and the Kingston Mill being built along the Millstone River. The town itself grew up in the early 18th century along an old Indian trail which became Nassau Street. The College of New Jersey, which became Princeton University in 1896, was founded in 1746 and moved to Princeton ten years later on the completion of Nassau Hall. The town sent two residents to sign the Declaration of Independence, Richard Stockton and John Witherspoon. A third former resident, Joseph Hewes, whose house, Maybury Hill, is a national historic landmark in Princeton that lies outside the historic district, also was a signer. The town was occupied by the British during the American Revolution, using Bainbridge House as their headquarters. After his famous crossing of the Delaware and victory at the Battle of Trenton, George Washington led the Continental Army to victory at the Battle of Princeton on January 3, 1777. Nassau Hall itself served as the capital of the United States in the summer of 1783 and George Washington received the nation's thanks there.

Princeton was home to four presidents, James Madison and Woodrow Wilson as students, the later also as university president, Grover Cleveland in the years after he left the White House, and John F. Kennedy during his freshman year, before his transfer to Harvard. Aaron Burr Jr. was a student here before being Vice-President of the United States and is buried in the Princeton Cemetery at the feet of his more highly esteemed father, Aaron Burr Sr., and theologian grandfather, Jonathan Edwards. Many architects from Benjamin Latrobe and Ralph Adams Cram to I. M. Pei and Frank Gehry have left their mark on the town. As home to the oldest Presbyterian Theological Seminary, Princeton has been host to many important theologians from Archibald Alexander and Samuel Miller to Charles Hodge and B. B. Warfield. Joseph Henry brought Princeton first to prominence as a center of science, a legacy that led Albert Einstein to make Princeton's Institute for Advanced Study his home after he fled Germany in 1933. Princeton has also been home to writers as varied as Thomas Mann, Upton Sinclair, F. Scott Fitzgerald, and Toni Morrison.

== Contributing properties ==
=== National Historic Landmarks ===
	Landmark name	Image	Date designated	Location	Built	Description
1	Nassau Hall	Nassau Hall	October 9, 1960 (Ref. # missing)	91 Nassau St; 40°20′55″N 74°39′34″W	1756	The oldest building at Princeton University and the largest in New Jersey when it was built in 1756. It served as the home of the American government from July to October 1783.
2	Morven	Morven	July 17, 1971 (Ref. # missing)	55 Stockton; 40°20′51″N 74°40′01″W	1750s	Built in 1754 by Richard Stockton (1730-1781), a signer of the Declaration of Independence. It served as the New Jersey Governors mansion from 1945 until 1982 and is now a museum.
3	Maclean House	Maclean House	July 17, 1971 (Ref. # missing)	73 Nassau St; 40°20′57″N 74°39′37″W	1756	John Witherspoon lived in this home for the president of the College of New Jersey (later Princeton University) between 1768 and 1779. During this time he also served as a delegate to the Continental Congress and signed the Declaration of Independence.
4	Joseph Henry House	Joseph Henry House	January 12, 1965 (Ref. # missing)	95 Nassau St; 40°20′58″N 74°39′32″W	1838	Home of Joseph Henry, whose scientific research on electromagnetic self-inductance led to the electrical telegraph. He was also the first Secretary of the Smithsonian Institution.
5	Prospect	Prospect	February 4, 1985 (Ref. # missing)	McCosh Walk; 40°20′50″N 74°39′24″W	1851	A fine example of John Notman's architecture. It formerly served as the official home of the president of Princeton University, and is now the faculty club. Woodrow Wilson lived here from 1902 to 1910, prior to entering politics.
6	Westland Mansion	Westland Mansion	June 23, 1965 (Ref. # missing)	15 Hodge Road; 40°21′05″N 74°40′04″W	mid-19th century	Mid-19th-century mansion built by Robert F. Stockton and later home of Grover Cleveland after he left the White House.
7	Albert Einstein House	Albert Einstein House	January 7, 1976 (Ref. # missing)	112 Mercer; 40°20′36″N 74°40′01″W	Before 1876	The home of Albert Einstein after his flight from Germany in 1933 until his death in 1955.

=== Independently listed on the National Register of Historic Places ===
	Name on the Register	Image	Date listed	Location	Built	Description
8	University Cottage Club	University Cottage Club	November 19, 1999 (Ref. # missing)	51 Prospect; 40°20′54″N 74°39′06″W	1906	One of Princeton's historic eating clubs, designed by McKim, Mead & White

=== Other significant contributing properties ===
	Name on the Register	Image	Date listed	Location	Built	Description
9	The Barracks	The Barracks	June 27, 1975 (Ref. # missing)	32 Edghill St; 40°20′42″N 74°40′05″W	ca. 1686	Built late 17th century, considered to be the oldest house still standing in Princeton. Built by the grandfather of Richard Stockton, a signer of the Declaration of Independence. The name derives from its presumed use as a barracks in the French and Indian War or American Revolution.
10	Princeton Cemetery	Princeton Cemetery	June 27, 1975 (Ref. # missing)	29 Greenview Av; 40°21′14″N 74°39′35″W	1757	Burial place of many prominent figures including Jonathan Edwards, Aaron Burr, Grover Cleveland, Paul Tulane, and Kurt Gödel among many others.
11	Bainbridge House	Bainbridge House	June 27, 1975 (Ref. # missing)	158 Nassau St; 40°21′02″N 74°39′27″W	1766	Built by Job Stockton of brickwork with wooden keystone lintels to a central hall plan, it retains much of its original woodwork and corner fireplaces. It was the birthplace of Commodore William Bainbridge and served as the headquarters of the British in 1776 before the Battle of Princeton. It has long served as the museum of the Princeton Historical Society.
12	Peacock Inn	Peacock Inn	June 27, 1975 (Ref. # missing)	20 Bayard Lane; 40°20′57″N 74°39′56″W	before 1779	18th-century home of Jonathan Deare, moved to Bayard Lane in 1875 by William Libbey. Since 1911 an inn and restaurant, one of the finest in the state.
13	Beatty House	Beatty House	June 27, 1975 (Ref. # missing)	19 Vandeventer; 40°21′06″N 74°39′27″W	ca. 1780	Built by Jacob Hyer, by whose name it is sometimes known, the house was purchased by Erkuries Beatty in 1816. The Marquis de Lafayette is known to have stayed here July 15, 1825. It was originally located on Nassau Street opposite Bainbridge House and was moved to its current location by James Vandeventer in 1875.
14	Stanhope Hall	Stanhope Hall	June 27, 1975 (Ref. # missing)	Elm Drive; 40°20′55″N 74°39′36″W	1803	The third building of Princeton University's campus, designed by Benjamin Henry Latrobe and originally home to the library, study halls, and literary societies. Later known as Geological Hall, in 1915 it was named in honor of Samuel Stanhope Smith, president of the university at the time of its construction.
15	Nassau Club	Nassau Club	June 27, 1975 (Ref. # missing)	6 Mercer St; 40°20′53″N 74°39′48″W	1813-14	Gentlemen's Club in Princeton, New Jersey founded in 1889 by Woodrow Wilson. The clubhouse was originally built in 1813-14 as the home of Samuel Miller, the second professor of the Princeton Theological Seminary, on land belonging to his father-in-law, Continental Congressman Jonathan Dickinson Sergeant.
16	Alexander Hall (Princeton Theological Seminary)	Alexander Hall (Princeton Theological Seminary)	June 27, 1975 (Ref. # missing)	64 Mercer St; 40°20′43″N 74°39′53″W	1814	The original building of the Princeton Theological Seminary, patterned after Nassau Hall, and designed by John McComb Jr.
17	Palmer House	Palmer House	June 27, 1975 (Ref. # missing)	1 Bayard Ln; 40°20′56″N 74°39′51″W	1823	Built by Charles Steadman for Robert F. Stockton. It is one of Steadman's earlier works and is noted for its elegant and restrained design. The building now serves as the guest house of Princeton University.
18	12 Morven Place	12 Morven Place	June 27, 1975 (Ref. # missing)	12 Morven Place; 40°20′59″N 74°40′04″W	c. 1830	Early Charles Steadman house with a center portico of Ionic columns.
19	20 Alexander Street	20 Alexander Street	June 27, 1975 (Ref. # missing)	20 Alexander; 40°20′47″N 74°39′48″W	1830s	Designed by Charles Steadman as part of Princeton's first housing development, with the houses marked by unity in variety.
20	Miller Chapel	Miller Chapel	June 27, 1975 (Ref. # missing)	64 Mercer St; 40°20′43″N 74°39′49″W	1834	The chapel of the Princeton Theological Seminary, designed by Charles Steadman in stuccoed brick with a simple Doric portico.
21	John Breckenridge House	John Breckenridge House	June 27, 1975 (Ref. # missing)	72 Library Place; 40°20′48″N 74°40′06″W	1836	Built by Charles Steadman the exterior details are especially fine and the facade well balanced. Named after longtime owner Professor John Breckenridge, uncle of John C. Breckinridge. It is thought to have originally had a small center porch, since replaced by stairs. Woodrow Wilson bought this house in 1889 and it is sometimes known by his name.
22	Nassau Presbyterian Church	Nassau Presbyterian Church	June 27, 1975 (Ref. # missing)	61 Nassau St; 40°20′56″N 74°39′39″W	1836	Built by Charles Steadman in Greek Revival style using stuccoed brick, and is a fine example of his use of the monumental, with a recessed porch flanked by pilasters.
23	40-42 Mercer Street	40-42 Mercer Street	June 27, 1975 (Ref. # missing)	40-42 Mercer; 40°20′48″N 74°39′52″W	1839	A double house indicating that Charles Steadman had begun to build houses for the working class.
24	Walter Lowrie House	Walter Lowrie House	June 27, 1975 (Ref. # missing)	83 Stockton St; 40°20′47″N 74°40′09″W	1845	Official residence of the president of Princeton University. Built by Robert F. Stockton for his son John P. Stockton, designed by John Notman. Later home to Paul Tulane, founder of Tulane University. From 1930-1959, it was home to Kierkegaardian scholar Walter Lowrie.
25	Ivy Hall	Ivy Hall	June 27, 1975 (Ref. # missing)	43 Mercer St; 40°20′48″N 74°39′53″W	1846	A small gothic building designed by John Notman as the home of the short-lived Princeton University law school. It gave its name to Ivy Club, the university's first eating club which was housed there from its founding in 1879 to 1883. Now the property of Trinity Church and home to its choir.
26	Springdale	Springdale	June 27, 1975 (Ref. # missing)	86 Mercer St; 40°20′39″N 74°39′55″W	1851	Designed by John Notman in 1851 for Richard Stockton, son of Commodore Robert F. Stockton. Now the official residence of the president of Princeton Theological Seminary.
27	Guernsey Hall	Guernsey Hall	June 27, 1975 (Ref. # missing)	63 Lovers Ln; 40°20′25″N 74°40′15″W	1850s	Designed by John Notman for the Stockton family. It is similar in design to Prospect House. It is noted for its central rotunda with a spiraling staircase with a circular skylight framed by octagonal panels.
28	Marquand Park	Marquand Park	June 27, 1975 (Ref. # missing)	50 Lovers Ln; 40°20′29″N 74°40′16″W	1855	The park was laid out by John Notman as a romantic landscape with many exotic plants and trees. It is named after former owner Allan Marquand whose descendants turned the property into a public park.
29	Nassau Christian Center	Nassau Christian Center	June 27, 1975 (Ref. # missing)	26 Nassau St; 40°20′57″N 74°39′44″W	1868	Built as Second Presbyterian Church of Princeton, the church was originally planned to have an exceedingly tall spire which was not added for cost reasons. It is now home to an Assemblies of God congregation.
30	Chancellor Green Library	Chancellor Green Library	June 27, 1975 (Ref. # missing)	95 Nassau St; 40°20′57″N 74°39′31″W	1870	A Venetian Gothic structure designed by William Appleton Potter as the first standalone library of Princeton University. It is noted for its multi-colored tile roof, detailed stone work, stained glass windows, and striking interior.
31	Trinity Episcopal Church	Trinity Episcopal Church	June 27, 1975 (Ref. # missing)	33 Mercer St; 40°20′50″N 74°39′53″W	1870	An historic Episcopalian congregation. The original 1833 Greek Revival building by Charles Steadman was replaced in 1870 by this Gothic design by Richard Upjohn. A major reconstruction was undertaken by Ralph Adams Cram in 1914.
32	Stuart Hall	Stuart Hall	June 27, 1975 (Ref. # missing)	45 Alexander; 40°20′43″N 74°39′47″W	1876	The main classroom building of the Princeton Theological Seminary, designed by William Appleton Potter in Venetian Gothic style.
33	Murray-Dodge Hall	Murray-Dodge Hall	June 27, 1975 (Ref. # missing)	McCosh Walk; 40°20′53″N 74°39′28″W	1879	Built for the Princeton University Evangelical Philadelphian Society in 1879 (Murray Hall) and 1900 (Dodge Hall) by Richard Morris Hunt. Murray Hall, known as Theater Intime, is now a theater and Dodge Hall, commonly called Murray-Dodge, is home to the Office of Religious Life.
34	32 Wiggins Street	32 Wiggins Street	June 27, 1975 (Ref. # missing)	32 Wiggins; 40°21′11″N 74°39′31″W	c. 1880	A fine example of "carpenters" Queen Anne architecture with lapped shingles and a hexagonal tower. It is typical of the spacious Victorian houses in the neighborhood.
35	William Berryman Scott House	William Berryman Scott House	June 27, 1975 (Ref. # missing)	56 Bayard Ln; 40°21′03″N 74°39′59″W	1888	Designed by A. Page Brown for William Berryman Scott, it is an interesting example of Shingle style architecture with ample proportions and skillful use of material.
36	Alexander Hall (Princeton University	Alexander Hall (Princeton University	June 27, 1975 (Ref. # missing)	68 Nassau St; 40°20′54″N 74°39′38″W	1892	A Richardsonian Romanesque concert hall designed by William Appleton Potter. The massive stone walls are punctuated by arches, with turrets at the four corners.
37	Tiger Inn	Tiger Inn	June 27, 1975 (Ref. # missing)	48 Prospect Ave; 40°20′56″N 74°39′08″W	1895	Third eating club at Princeton University, with reputation as the Animal House of Princeton.
38	Blair Tower	Blair Tower	June 27, 1975 (Ref. # missing)	26 University Pl; 40°20′51″N 74°39′39″W	1896	One of the early Collegiate Gothic buildings at Princeton University, designed by Cope and Stewardson to provide a monumental staircase and arch entrance from the Princeton train station (1865).
39	Lower Pyne	Lower Pyne	June 27, 1975 (Ref. # missing)	42 Nassau St; 40°21′00″N 74°39′35″W	1896	Designed by Raleigh C. Gildersleeve for Moses Taylor Pyne in Tudor Revival style. It originally housed dormitories above commercial space as a way to integrate the Princeton University campus with the town.
40	Old Princeton Bank and Trust	Old Princeton Bank and Trust	June 27, 1975 (Ref. # missing)	12 Nassau St; 40°20′56″N 74°39′47″W	1896	Designed by William E. Stone in Dutch Colonial style, the building demonstrates diversity of architectural styles within the architectural unity of the town.
41	Ivy Club	Ivy Club	June 27, 1975 (Ref. # missing)	43 Prospect Ave; 40°20′53″N 74°39′08″W	1897	Oldest and most prestigious eating club at Princeton University, first housed in Ivy Hall, from which it got its name.
42	Thanet Lodge	Thanet Lodge	June 27, 1975 (Ref. # missing)	53 Bayard Lane; 40°21′03″N 74°39′56″W	1902	The 1902 mansion of famed archaeologist and Olympic athlete William Libbey, now home to the Lewis School of Princeton
43	FitzRandolph Gate	FitzRandolph Gate	June 27, 1975 (Ref. # missing)	91 Nassau St; 40°20′59″N 74°39′35″W	1905	The main gate of Princeton University, designed by McKim, Mead & White using adapted Georgian ironwork. It is named after Nathaniel FitzRandolph, who donated the land on which Nassau Hall sits.
44	Colonial Club	Colonial Club	June 27, 1975 (Ref. # missing)	40 Prospect ave 40°20′56″N 74°39′10″W	1906	Fifth oldest eating club at Princeton University, referred to as "flamboyant Colonial" by F. Scott Fitzgerald in This Side of Paradise
45	Cap and Gown Club	Cap and Gown Club	June 27, 1975 (Ref. # missing)	61 Prospect ave 40°20′54″N 74°39′04″W	1908	The only eating club at Princeton University to stay at the same location since its founding. The current clubhouse is the third on site. Members perpetrated the Great Dinky Robbery of 1963.
46	Campus Club	Campus Club	June 27, 1975 (Ref. # missing)	5 Prospect ave 40°20′51″N 74°39′16″W	1909	Former eating club at Princeton University closed in 2005 and turned into a student lounge
47	Palmer Physical Laboratory	Palmer Physical Laboratory	June 27, 1975 (Ref. # missing)	Princeton University; 40°20′49″N 74°39′19″W	1909	The former Palmer Physical Laboratory, built 1910 to house the Princeton University Physics Department, home to lectures by Albert Einstein and work on the Manhattan Project, renovated and expanded in 2000 into the Frist Campus Center
48	Cannon Club	Cannon Club	June 27, 1975 (Ref. # missing)	21 Prospect ave 40°20′52″N 74°39′12″W	1910	One of the eating clubs at Princeton University, closed in the early 1970s following racially charged incidents, reopened 2011
49	Princeton United Methodist Church	Princeton United Methodist Church	June 27, 1975 (Ref. # missing)	7 Vandeventer; 40°21′03″N 74°39′25″W	1911	Founded in 1847, the present sanctuary was dedicated in 1911 on property donated by Moses Taylor Pyne.
50	Princeton University Press	Princeton University Press	June 27, 1975 (Ref. # missing)	41 William St; 40°21′00″N 74°39′13″W	1911	Founded by Whitney Darrow, with the financial support of Charles Scribner, as a printing press to serve the Princeton community in 1905, with a distinctive building designed by Ernest Flagg
51	Graduate College	Graduate College	June 27, 1975 (Ref. # missing)	1 College Road; 40°20′26″N 74°39′53″W	1913	Designed by Ralph Adams Cram and contains some of the most spectacular Collegiate Gothic architecture on Princeton's campus, including Cleveland Tower, Proctor Hall, and the Van Dyke Library.
52	Charter Club	Charter Club	June 27, 1975 (Ref. # missing)	79 Prospect ave 40°20′56″N 74°39′00″W	1914	Ninth eating club at Princeton University, party in 1988 sent 45 to the hospital
53	University Dining Halls	University Dining Halls	June 27, 1975 (Ref. # missing)	Madison Hall; 40°20′54″N 74°39′45″W	1916	Designed by Day and Klauder, a complex of five Gothic dining halls arranged around a central kitchen. The structure is named Madison Hall after alumnus James Madison. At present only two of the halls are used for dining.
54	Quadrangle Club	Quadrangle Club	June 27, 1975 (Ref. # missing)	33 Prospect ave 40°20′53″N 74°39′10″W	1916	One of the eating clubs at Princeton University, described by F. Scott Fitzgerald in This Side of Paradise as "Literary Quadrangle"
55	Tower Club	Tower Club	June 27, 1975 (Ref. # missing)	13 Prospect ave 40°20′52″N 74°39′14″W	1917	One of the eating clubs at Princeton University, formed 1902
56	Terrace Club	Terrace Club	June 27, 1975 (Ref. # missing)	13 Prospect ave 40°20′50″N 74°39′14″W	1920	One of the eating clubs at Princeton University. The clubhouse was reconstructed on the former home of John Grier Hibben.
57	Princeton Battle Monument	Princeton Battle Monument	June 27, 1975 (Ref. # missing)	1 Monument Dr; 40°20′52″N 74°39′57″W	1922	The monument was designed by the prominent Beaux Arts sculptor Frederick MacMonnies with the assistance of architect Thomas Hastings. It commemorates the January 3, 1777 Battle of Princeton, and depicts General George Washington leading his troops to victory as well as the death of General Hugh Mercer. It stands 50 feet (15 m) tall and was inspired by carvings on the Arc de Triomphe in Paris.
58	McCormick Hall	McCormick Hall	June 27, 1975 (Ref. # missing)	Princeton University campus 40°20′50″N 74°39′29″W	1923-2021	The oldest component of McCormick Hall, home to the Princeton University Art Museum, built 1923 and designed in Venetian Gothic by Ralph Adams Cram, demolished in 2021 to make way for a new art museum building.
59	Cloister Inn	Cloister Inn	June 27, 1975 (Ref. # missing)	65 Prospect ave 40°20′55″N 74°39′02″W	1924	The 16th eating club to be founded at Princeton University
60	Princeton University Chapel	Princeton University Chapel	June 27, 1975 (Ref. # missing)	Chapel Drive; 40°20′56″N 74°39′25″W	1928	Built at a cost of $2,000,000 after the previous Marquand Chapel was destroyed by fire in 1920. Seats nearly 2,000 and was the second largest university chapel in the world when built, after that of King's College, Cambridge.
61	Palmer Square Post Office	Palmer Square Post Office	June 27, 1975 (Ref. # missing)	20 Palmer Sq E 40°21′01″N 74°39′40″W	1937	Built during the New Deal, the post office is known for its mural, Columbia under the Palm, painted by Karl Free for the Section of Painting and Sculpture. The mural has come under criticism for its depiction of the triumph of European settlers over indigenous peoples.
62	Nassau Inn	Nassau Inn	June 27, 1975 (Ref. # missing)	10 Palmer Square; 40°21′02″N 74°39′40″W	1938	Princeton's only full-service hotel, dates to 1769, current building to 1938 as part of Palmer Square, Yankee Doodle Tap Room home to Norman Rockwell mural
63	Dillon Gymnasium	Dillon Gymnasium	June 27, 1975 (Ref. # missing)	Elm Drive; 40°20′44″N 74°39′32″W	1947	Replaced University Gymnasium, which burned to the ground in 1944. Houses a 1,500-seat gymnasium, squash courts and a pool. Designed by Aymar Embury and named for Herbert L. Dillon, class of 1907, a one-time football captain.
64	Firestone Library	Firestone Library	June 27, 1975 (Ref. # missing)	1 Washington Road; 40°20′58″N 74°39′27″W	1948	The main library system of Princeton University, named after tire magnate Harvey Firestone, with holdings of more than 7 million books, 6 million microforms, and 48,000 linear feet of manuscripts

== See also ==
- National Register of Historic Places listings in Mercer County, New Jersey
- List of National Historic Landmarks in New Jersey
