= Peacock Inn (Princeton, New Jersey) =

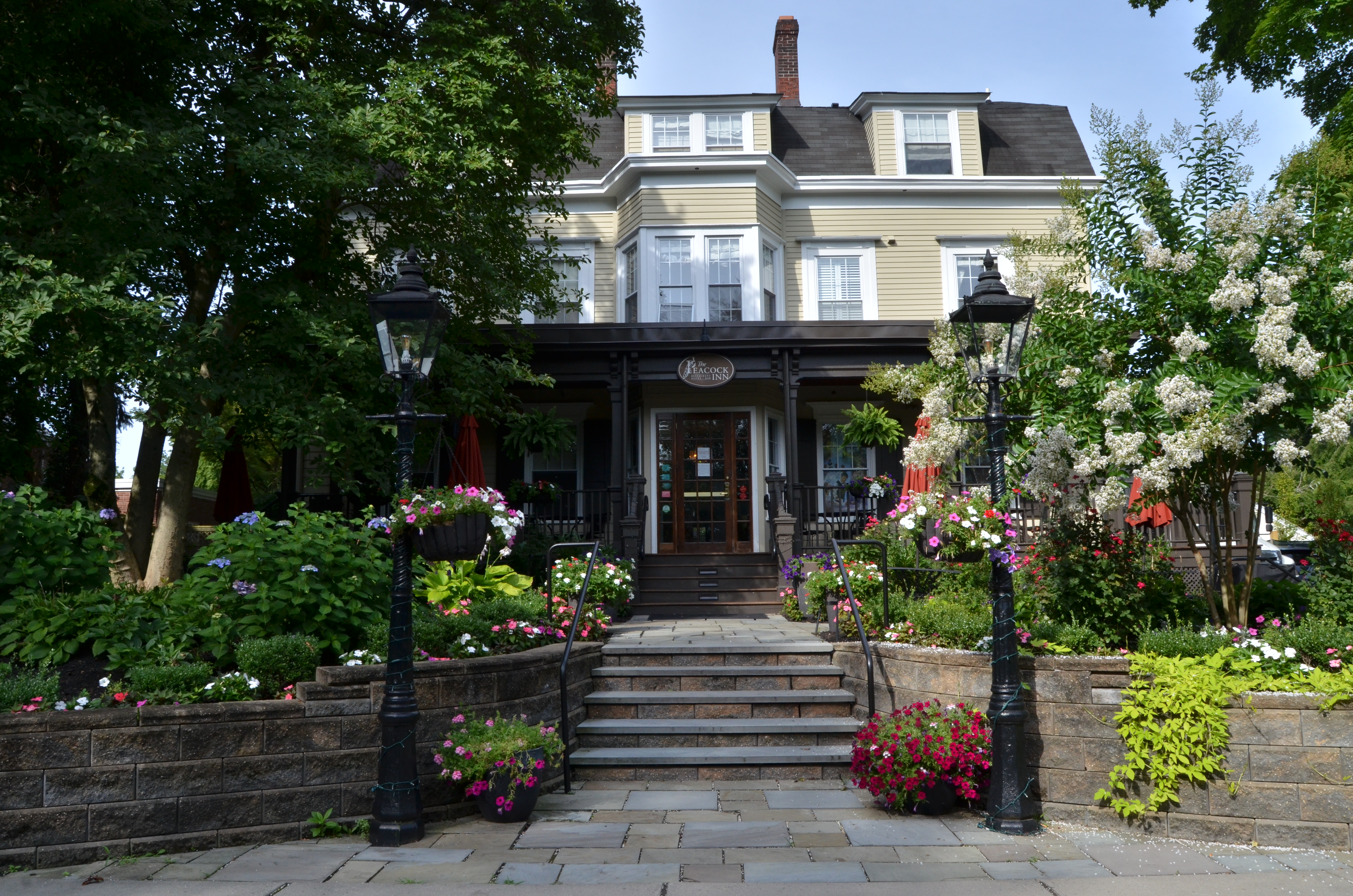
- Interactive map of Peacock Inn

Restaurant information
- Established: 1911
- Owner: Genesis Hospitality Group
- Previous owners: Barry and Elaine Sussman
- Food type: Seasonally Inspired
- Dress code: Smart casual
- Rating: 26.67 (Zagat); Top 25 Best Restaurants in New Jersey of 2014
- Website: peacockinn.com
- Peacock Inn
- U.S. Historic district – Contributing property
- Location within Mercer County, New Jersey
- Location: 20 Bayard Lane, Princeton, NJ
- Coordinates: 40.3491°N 74.6654°W
- Built: 18th century
- Part of: Princeton Historic District (ID75001143)
- Designated CP: 27 June 1975

The Peacock Inn is a historic restaurant and inn in Princeton, New Jersey. The building itself dates to the 18th century and was originally located at the corner of Nassau Street and University Place. During the American Revolution it was the home of Jonathan Deare, and played host to members of the Continental Congress when they met in nearby Nassau Hall. It was moved to its current location in 1875 by famed archaeologist and Olympic athlete William Libbey. Joseph and Helen O'Conner purchased the property in 1911 and opened the Peacock Inn, naming it after an inn in Derbyshire, England. The Inn has 16 guest rooms but is most known for its restaurant, consistently rated one of the finest in the state.

Combining historic charm with contemporary elegance, The Perch at Peacock Inn offers a refined and welcoming atmosphere. Committed to exceptional hospitality and culinary quality, the restaurant crafts its menus around locally sourced ingredients and seasonal flavors, highlighting the best of regional farms and fresh, thoughtful cuisine.
