= Princeton Law School =

19th-century department of the US university

- Ivy Hall
- U.S. Historic district – Contributing property
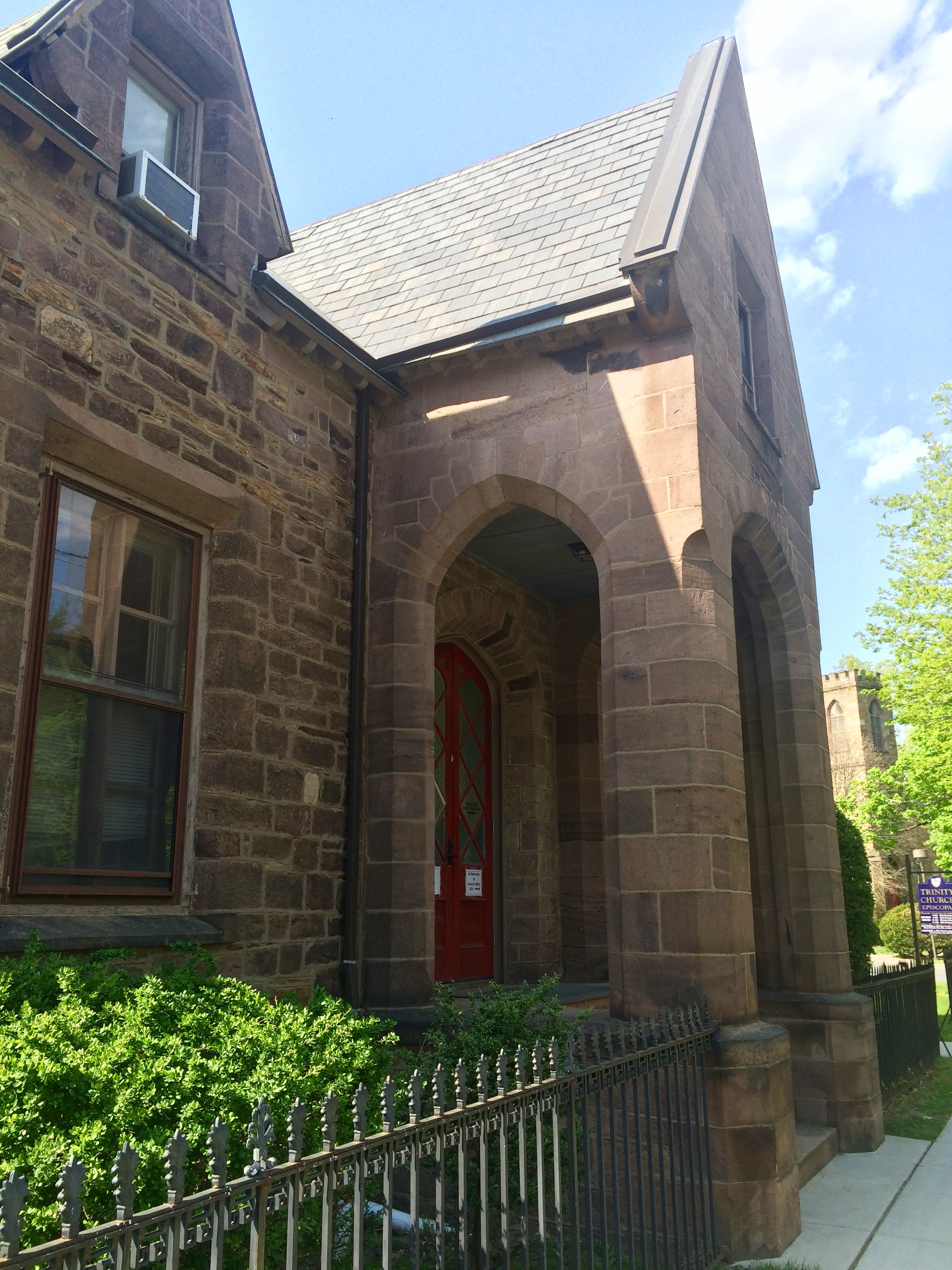
- Ivy Hall, built to house the law school, later home to The Ivy Club, to which it gave its name, and now home to the choir of Trinity Church, Princeton

- Location within Mercer County, New Jersey Location within New Jersey Location within the United States
- Location: Mercer and Alexander St, Princeton, New Jersey
- Coordinates: 40°20′48.2″N 74°39′53.5″W
- Built: 1846
- Architect: John Notman
- Architectural style: Italianate
- Part of: Princeton Historic District (ID75001143)
- Added to NRHP: June 27, 1975

The Law School at the College of New Jersey (now Princeton University) was a department of Princeton University from 1847 until 1852.

== History ==
In the 1820s, an attempt was made to organize teaching in law, but this plan ended following the death of the designated professor.

The Law School at the College of New Jersey began instruction in 1847 as a modest effort consisting of three professors: Joseph Coerten Hornblower, Richard Stockton Field, and James S. Green. Only seven students obtained a law degree before the school closed in 1852. The short-lived experiment was the furthest the university got in a recurring ambition, marked by varying levels of effort, to establish a law school.

In 1890, Princeton President Francis Landey Patton lamented that Princeton had faculties of philosophy and theology but needed to send Princeton graduates to Harvard or Columbia to study law.

From 1923 to 1925, the university once again formed appreciable plans for the start of a law school but abandoned the idea due to cost and financial risk.

In 1974, then president of Princeton, William G. Bowen, selected a committee to investigate and advise on the achievability of a law school. The committee recommended plans for a law school be deferred after citing high construction costs.

Besides Princeton, Brown and Dartmouth are the two other Ivy League schools to lack a law school.

== Law at Princeton University today ==
Princeton University does not have a law school currently. Princeton, instead, focuses on the undergraduate educational experience.

However, through the University's Princeton School of Public and International Affairs, Princeton maintains graduate programs in law and public policy. In this program students can earn a Master in Public Affairs (M.P.A.), a Master in Public Policy (M.P.P.), or a Ph.D. in Public Affairs. There is also the possibility of enrolling in a joint degree program, where students can earn a Juris Doctor (J.D.) from collaborating universities.

There is also the Program in Law and Public Policy (P•LAW) "faculty affiliates teach and publish widely on topics from constitutional law and U.S. history to criminal justice, technology and foreign relations, engaging the University, the Princeton community, and the general public about the many ways law impacts American life." Although this program teaches graduate and undergraduate coursework, via their scholars and fellowship programs, it does not award graduate degrees.

Though formally housed in the department of politics, Robert P. George also holds the title of McCormick Professor of Jurisprudence.

Princeton University does award honorary degrees of law. Sonia Sotomayor, then Circuit Judge of the United States Court of Appeals for the Second Circuit and currently Associate Justice of the Supreme Court of the United States, received an Honorary Doctor of Laws Degree from Princeton University.

== Mistaken and fictional references ==
At a press conference of law school deans in 1998 decrying the annual US News Law School Rankings, then New York University School of Law Dean John Sexton quipped, "If they were asked about Princeton Law School, it would appear on the top 20 -- but it doesn't exist" Sexton was denouncing the US News usage of reputation survey results from judges, lawyers and law school deans in its ranking formula, expressing doubt over the expertise of some surveyed.

A 2003 National Review Online commentary blundered when the author, Candace de Russy, identified the law school at Princeton as real: "These yearnings are embodied in a doctrine called ‘transnational progressivism,’ which is gaining prominence in law schools, for example, at Princeton and Rutgers".

Similarly, during the Senate Judiciary Committee vote for Supreme Court nominee Samuel Alito, Sen. Richard Durbin attested that now Justice Alito hailed from "Princeton Law." Alito attended Princeton University for his undergraduate studies, but received his law degree from Yale Law School.

== See also ==
- List of defunct law schools in the United States

== Sources ==
- Leitch, Alexander (1978). A Princeton Companion. Princeton University Press. ISBN 0-691-04654-9.
