= Morven (Princeton, New Jersey) =

- U.S. National Register of Historic Places
- U.S. National Historic Landmark
- U.S. Historic district – Contributing property
- New Jersey Register of Historic Places
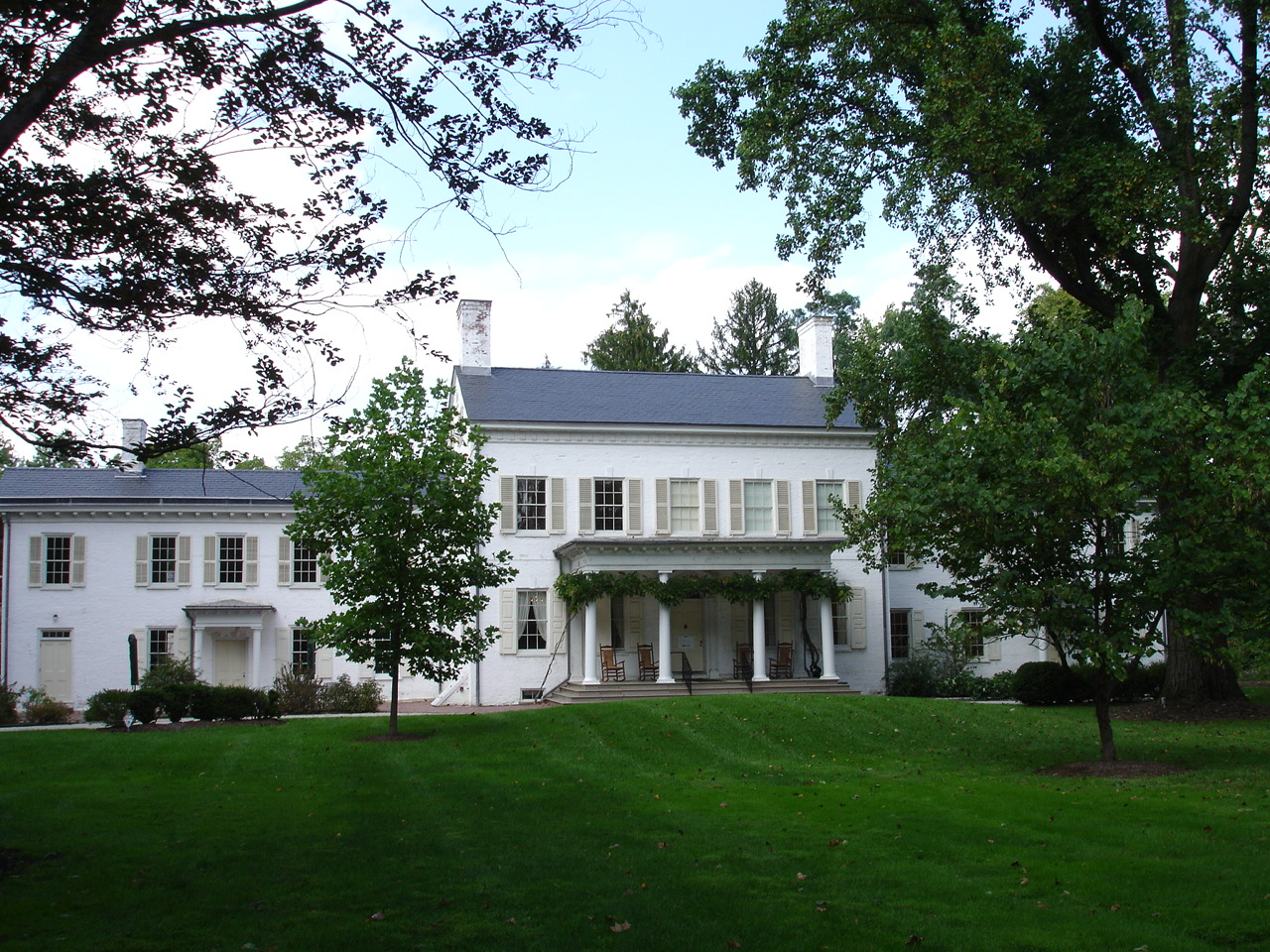
- Morven in 2006

- Location within Mercer County, New Jersey Location within New Jersey Location within the United States
- Location: 55 Stockton Street, Princeton, New Jersey, United States
- Coordinates: 40°20′50.97″N 74°40′1.03″W
- Built: 1730
- Architectural style: Georgian
- Part of: Princeton Historic District (ID75001143)
- NRHP reference No.: 71000503
- NJRHP No.: 1738

Significant dates
- Added to NRHP: January 25, 1971
- Designated NHL: July 17, 1971
- Designated NJRHP: September 11, 1970

Morven, known officially as Morven Museum & Garden, is a historic 18th-century house in Princeton, New Jersey. It served as the governor's mansion for nearly four decades in the 20th century, and has been designated a National Historic Landmark for its association with Richard Stockton (1730-1781), a signer of the United States Declaration of Independence.

== History ==
In 1701, Richard Stockton was granted 5,500-acre (2,200 ha) by William Penn which included the land where Morven now stands. In the 1750s, his grandson, also named Richard Stockton, had 150 acres (61 ha) on which he built the house that his wife Annis Boudinot Stockton named "Morven", after a mythical Gaelic kingdom in Ireland.

Commodore Robert Stockton (1795–1866) later lived in the house that was built on the property. Robert Wood Johnson II, chairman of the company Johnson & Johnson, leased the home after Bayard Stockton died during 1932.

The house remained in Stockton family ownership until 1944, when it was purchased by New Jersey Governor Walter E. Edge. The sale was subject to the condition that Morven would be given to the state of New Jersey within two years of Edge's death. Edge transferred ownership of Morven to the state during 1954, several years before he died.

Morven served as New Jersey's governor's mansion from 1944 until 1981, when it was donated to the New Jersey Historical Society. In 1982, Drumthwacket was designated as New Jersey Governor's Mansion and converted to the new official residence. Morven underwent research and restoration, and was opened as a museum in 2004.

== Owners ==
- "The Builder" Richard Stockton (c.1665-1709) from 1701 to 1709
- Honorable John Stockton (1701-1758) from 1709 to 1758
- "The Signer" Richard Stockton (1730–1781) from 1758 to 1781
- "The Duke" Richard Stockton (1764-1828) from 1781 to 1828
- Commodore Robert Field Stockton (1795–1866) from 1828 to 1866
- Major Samuel Witham Stockton (1834-1899)
- Walter E. Edge from 1944 to 1954
- Governor's Mansion from 1954 to 1981
- Museum since 1982

== Architecture ==
Morven is a 2-1/2 story brick building, with a gabled roof and end chimneys. Two-story wings extend to either side of the main block. A Greek Revival porch extends across the center three bays of the main block's five-bay facade. The interior has an atypical central hall plan. The staircase, normally in the center hall in these plans, is instead placed crosswise in a rear hall which also provides access to the wings. To the right of the central hall is the Gold Room, a parlor, while the main dining room is on the left. The left wing housed servant quarters and the kitchen, while the right wing housed the library and a family room. The interior styling is consistent with late 18th and early 19th century architectural fashions.

== See also ==
- National Register of Historic Places listings in Mercer County, New Jersey
- Westland Mansion, patterned after Morven
