= Princeton United Methodist Church =

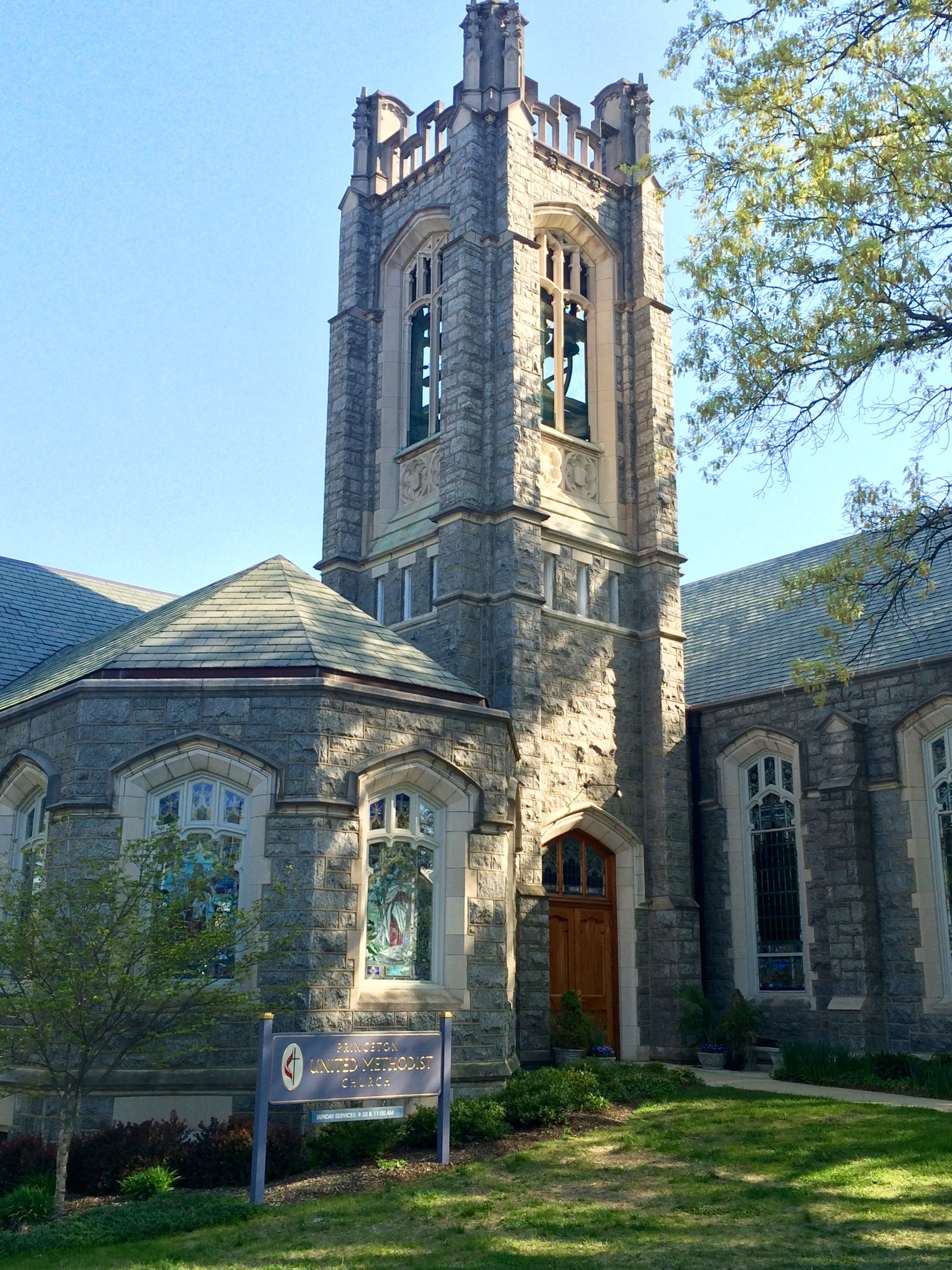
- Princeton United Methodist Church
- Location: 7 Vandeventer Ave., Princeton, New Jersey 08542
- Country: United States
- Denomination: United Methodist Church
- Previous denomination: Methodist Episcopal Church
- Churchmanship: Mainline Protestant
- Website: princetonumc.org

History
- Former name: Princeton Methodist Episcopal Church
- Founded: 1847
- Dedicated: October 11, 1911

Architecture
- Style: Gothic
- Groundbreaking: June 18, 1910
- Princeton United Methodist Church
- U.S. Historic district – Contributing property
- Location within Mercer County, New Jersey Location within New Jersey Location within the United States
- Coordinates: 40°21′02.6″N 74°39′25.1″W
- Part of: Princeton Historic District (ID75001143)
- Added to NRHP: 27 June 1975

Princeton United Methodist Church is a United Methodist congregation located at 7 Vandeventer Avenue in Princeton, New Jersey. The church is located on Nassau Street, directly across from Princeton University.

== History ==
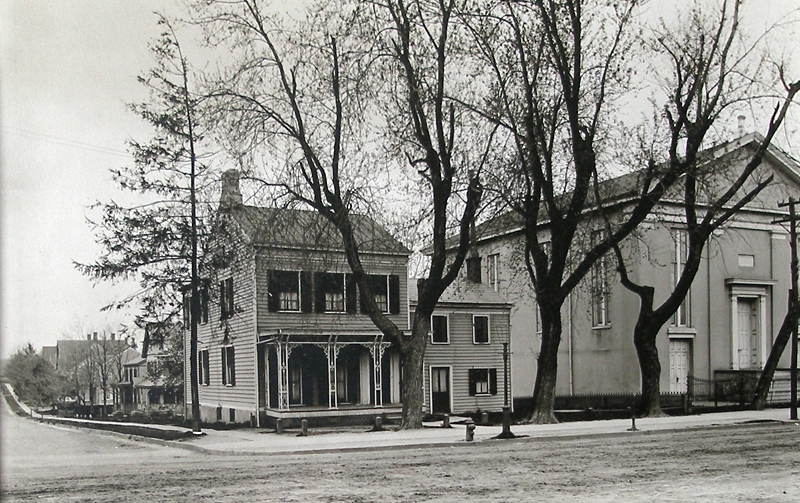
The original church building with Dr. Bartine's house on the corner

Methodist circuit riders made periodic visits to minister in private homes to groups of Princeton Methodists. A congregation was founded in 1847 under the name, Princeton Methodist Episcopal Church. The original church building occupied the eastern portion of the present church frontage on Nassau Street, with the corner with Vandeventer occupied by the house of Dr. Bartine, a physician and church member. The first floor was the sanctuary while the basement provided rooms for Sunday School. The first pastor was Joseph Ashbrook.

By 1905 plans were drawn up for a new church. The Rev. Dr. James M. Buckley described the need:

Princeton is one of the most beautiful places in the land. Presbyterians have poured out their money, until, including the buildings of the Theological Seminary and the University, the town contains the finest assembly of educational buildings in the land. It was a great grief to me to look upon the little Methodist Church, in a most conspicuous place, not because it is a Methodist Church, but because of its insignificance and entire inadequacy to represent the denomination in that classic town. All this becomes more significant when we remember that the President of the University expects to secure $12,500,000 for additional buildings and endowments. When this vast sum becomes operative in the work of the Institution, Princeton will be one of the greatest educational centers of the world.

The present sanctuary was dedicated in 1911, with Dr. Bartine's property bought out and donated by Moses Taylor Pyne, himself and Episcopalian. An education wing was opened in 1959, and an expansion to that wing in 2002.

The church installed electronic bells in 1997 which play after the clock strikes (also electronic) at noon and 5pm on weekdays. On Sundays a hymn is played at 10:45am and 12:15pm. A hymn is played appropriate to the church season drawn from a selection of 300 traditional, Methodist, or gospel hymns. The church has a service at 10:00 am on Sundays with children's programming during worship.

== Gallery ==
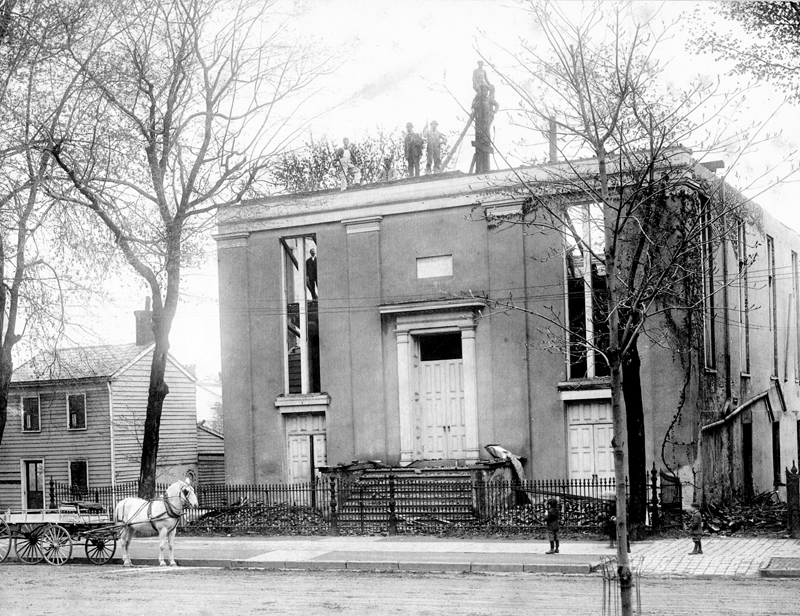
The old church after a fire

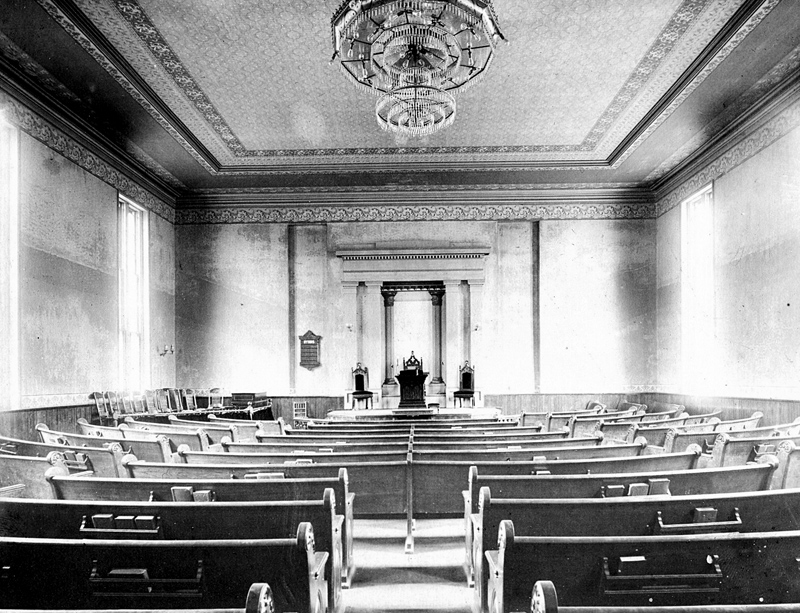
Interior of the old church

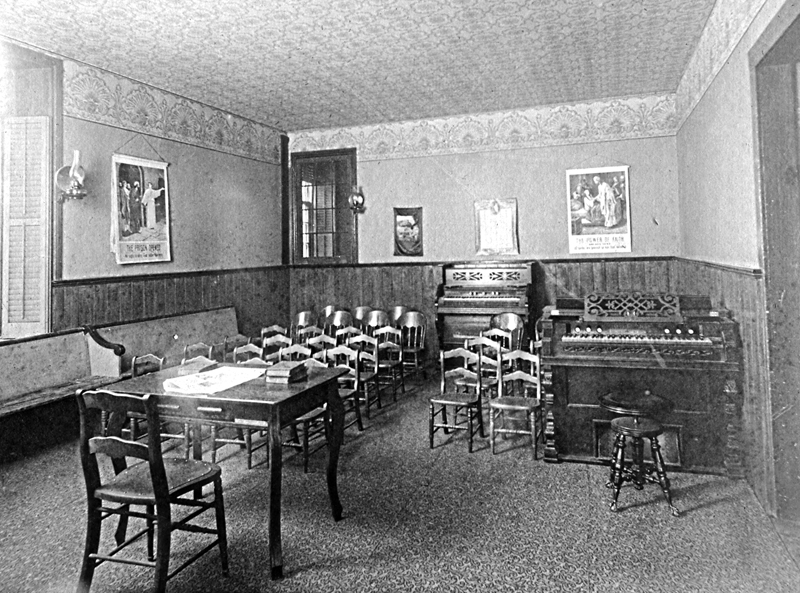
Sunday school room in the basement of the old church
