= Princeton Seminary Chapel =

Historic church in New Jersey, United States

- U.S. Historic district – Contributing property
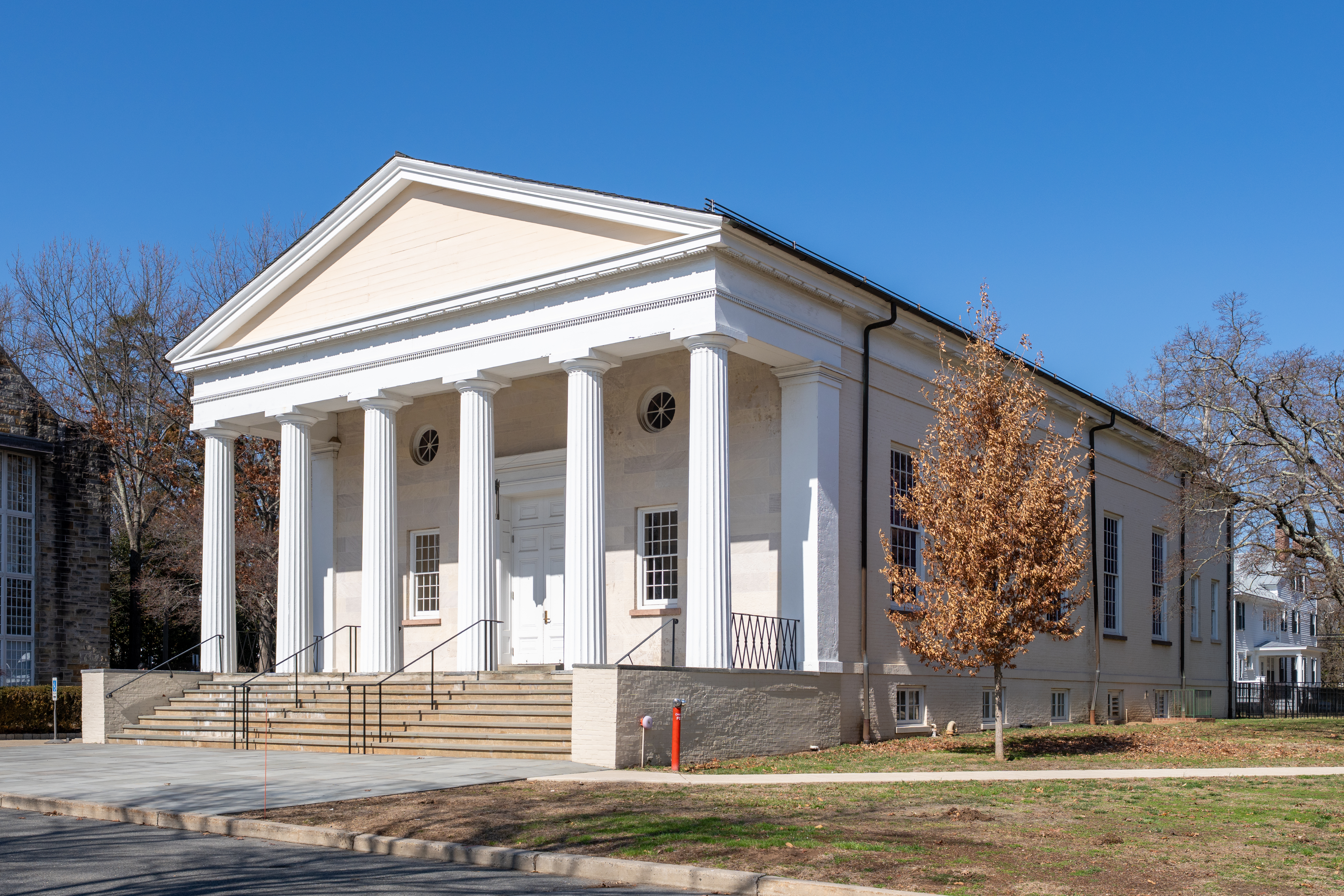
- Location: 64 Mercer St., Princeton, NJ
- Coordinates: 40°20′42.5″N 74°39′48.9″W
- Built: 1834
- Architect: Charles Steadman
- Architectural style: Greek Revival
- Part of: Princeton Historic District (ID75001143)
- Designated CP: 27 June 1975

The Princeton Seminary Chapel is the spiritual center of the Princeton Theological Seminary, located in New Jersey, United States, and has been in continuous use since its completion in 1834. It was built by renowned local architect and builder Charles Steadman in stuccoed brick with a simple Doric portico. As the chapel of the oldest Presbyterian Seminary in the United States, the building has been home to many of the most important Presbyterian theologians, including the great figures of the Princeton Theology. The narthex has plaques that honor Samuel Miller, after whom the chapel is named, Charles Hodge, Archibald Alexander Hodge, Caspar Wistar Hodge, Sr., and B. B. Warfield.

== History ==
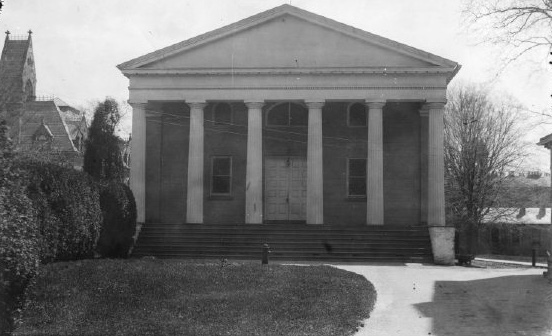
Miller Chapel with its pre-1933 design, located adjacent to Alexander Hall, facing Mercer Street. The Stuart Hall tower, since removed, can be seen at left.

The chapel originally faced Mercer Street to the east and slightly behind Alexander Street. It was designed in the Reformed tradition with one worship space, unifying the choir, congregants, and clergy, and with a central pulpit, emphasizing the proclamation of the Word of God. Originally a twin building was planned so as to flank Alexander Hall with Greek Revival buildings in the same way Nassau Hall was flanked by the original Whig and Clio Halls.

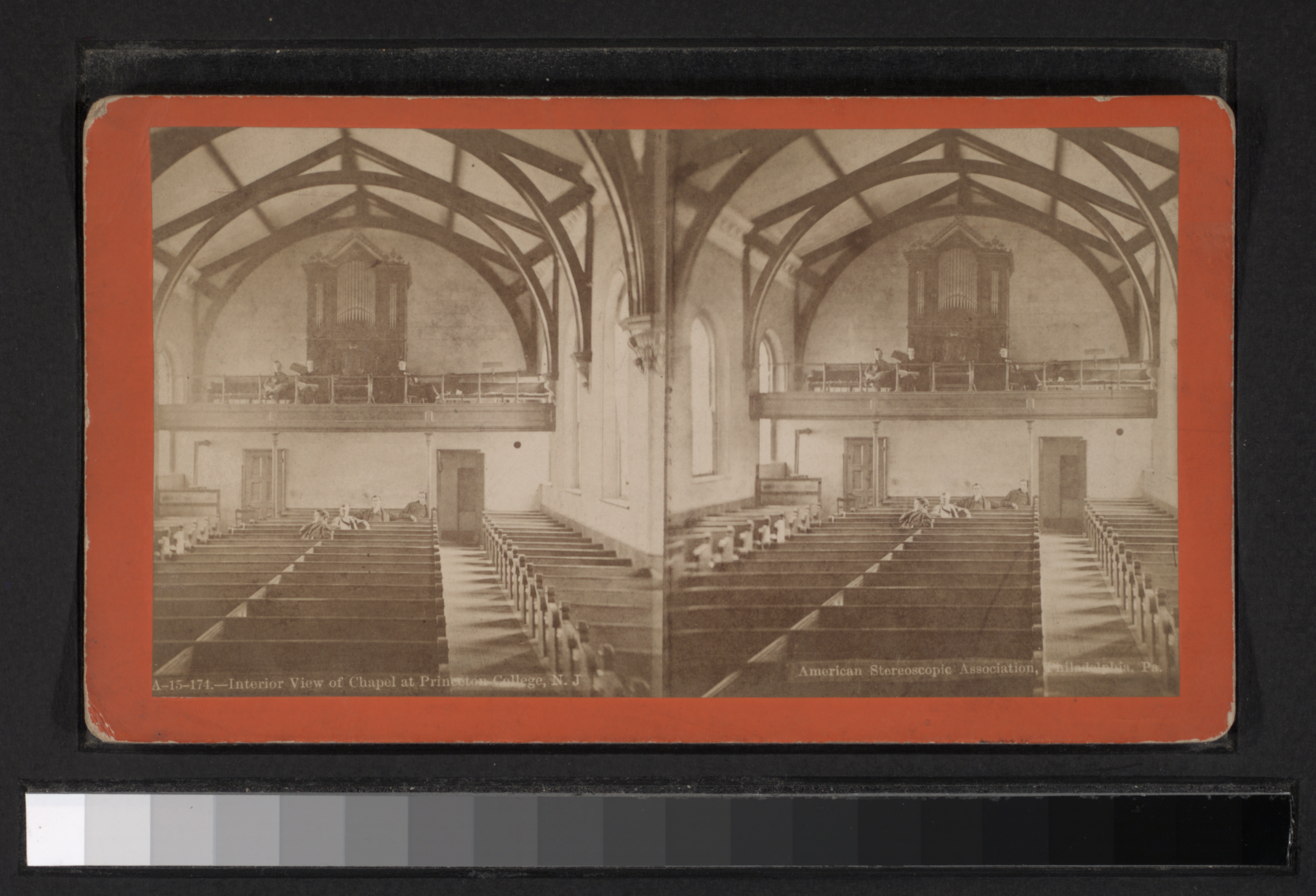
Chapel interior (mislabeled), ca 1860

An 1874 renovation added Victorian stained glass windows and an organ, moving away from the traditional Reformed aversion to instruments in worship. In 1933 a more substantial renovation by Delano & Aldrich moved the chapel so as to face the interior of the campus, serving as the cornerstone of two squares, bounded by Alexander and Hodge Halls to the north and Stuart and Brown Halls in the south. The renovation also enlarged the building and removed the Victorian windows so as to restore a more simple appearance, consistent with the Seminary's Reformed heritage. Later renovations took place in 1964 and 2000. The chapel is home to the Joe R. Engle Organ, given to the Seminary in 2000. In addition to daily services the chapel hosts a variety of concerts during the course of the year. Weddings in the chapel are limited to those where either the bride, groom, or parent of either, is a student, graduate, trustee, or employee of the seminary.

On January 25, 2022, the Board of Trustees of Princeton Seminary voted to rename Miller Chapel in light of Samuel Miller's direct ties to slavery. "This decision followed thoughtful deliberation by the Board of Trustees, and it is part of their commitment to the ongoing work of confession and repentance that was part of the historical audit on slavery." The new name is Seminary Chapel.

== Gallery ==
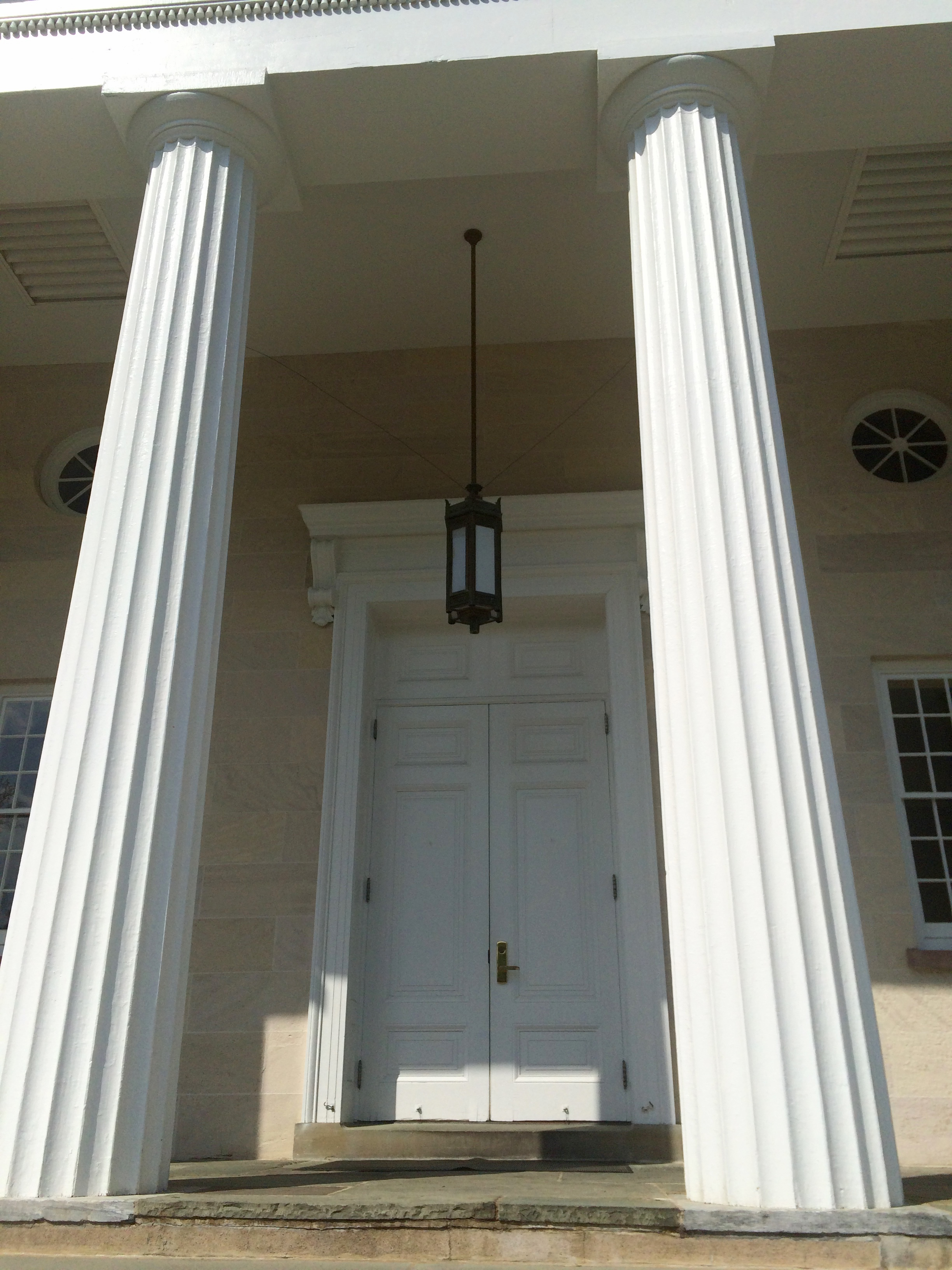
The portico with the Doric colonnade

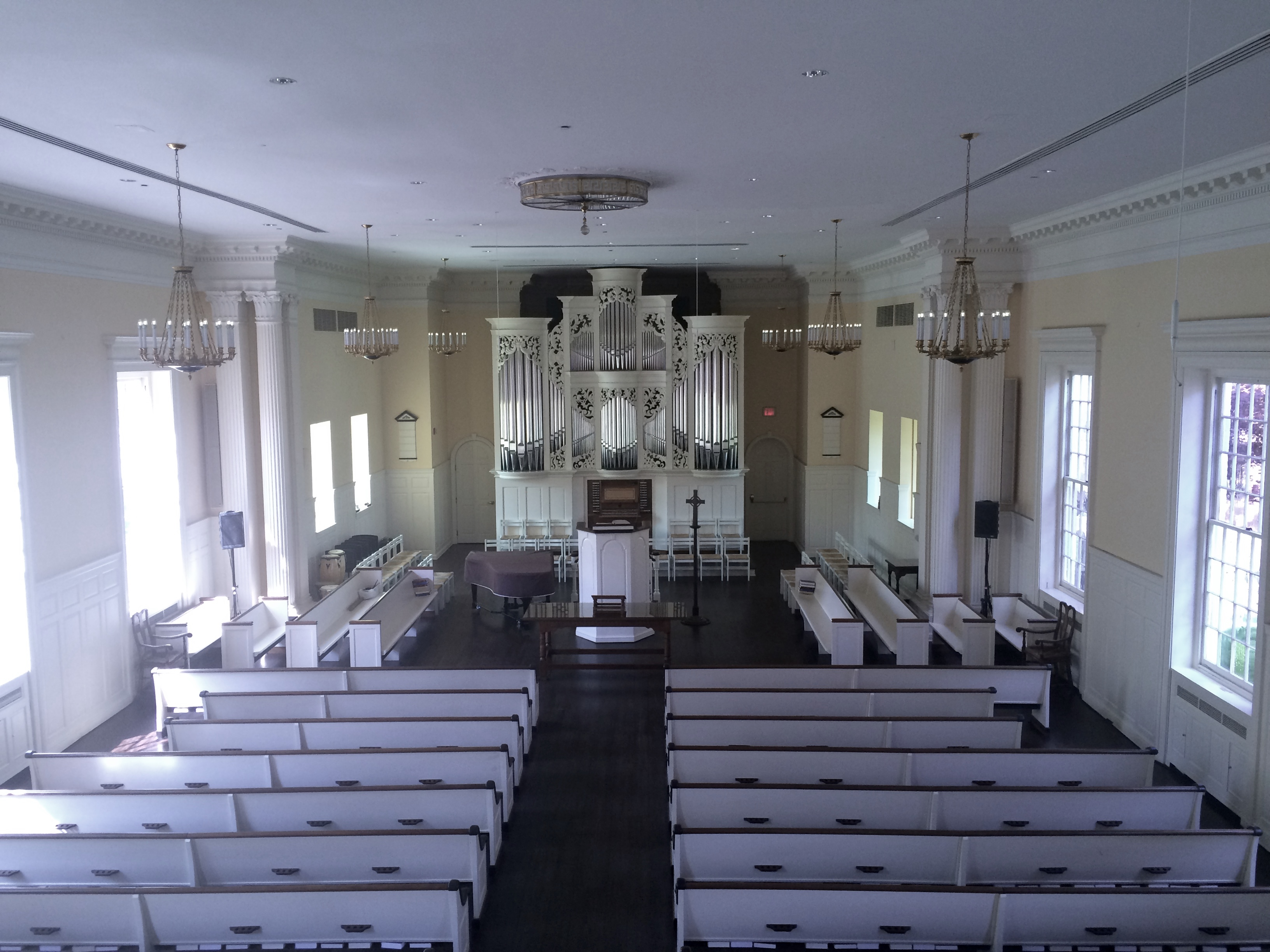
The interior showing the central place of the pulpit

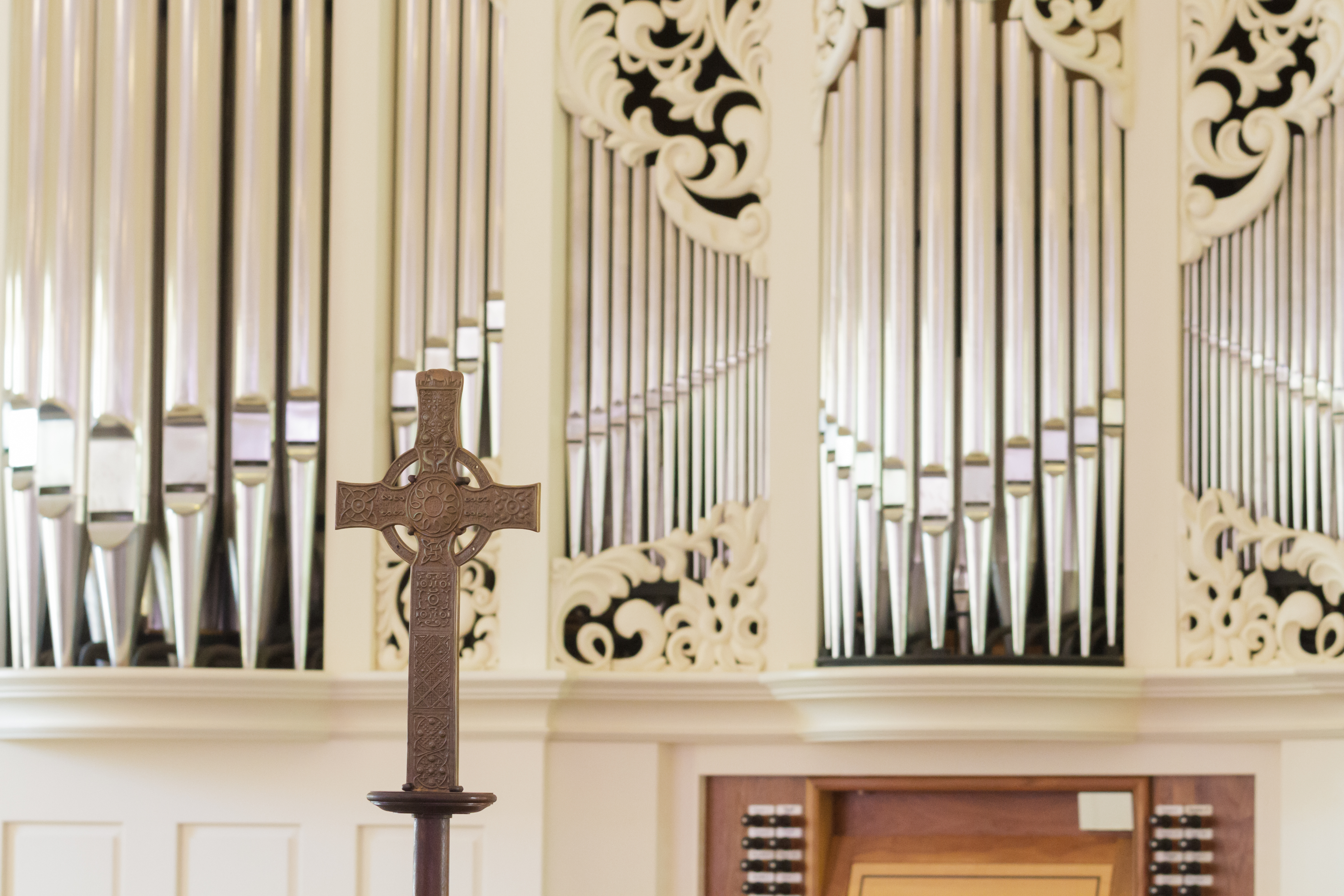
Detail of the cross

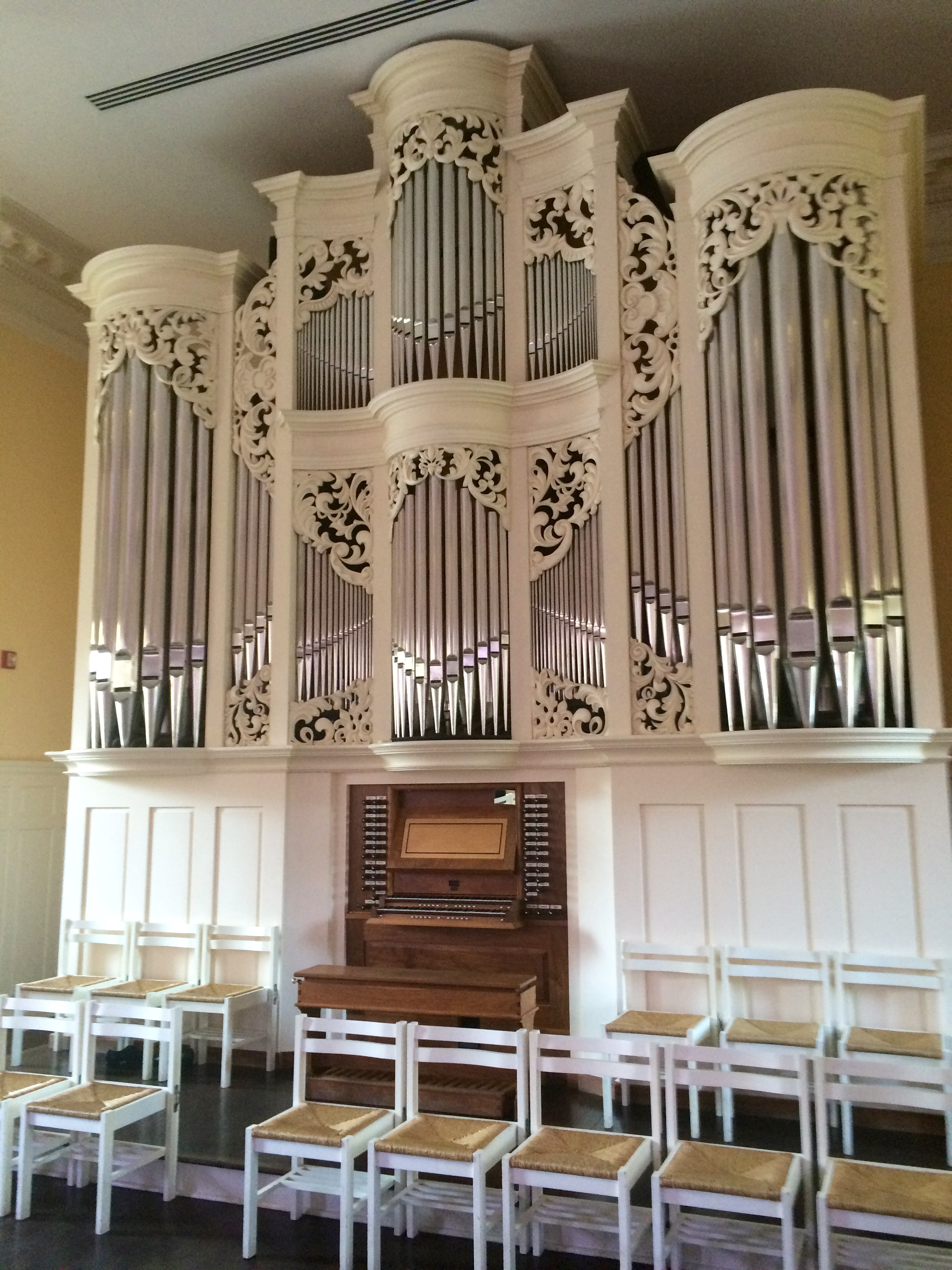
The Joe R. Engle Organ

== See also ==
- Nassau Presbyterian Church, a nearby church, also designed by Charles Steadman, in a similar style
