= The Lewis School of Princeton =

Information
- Type: Private School for those with learning difficulties
- Established: 1973
- Founder: Marsha Gaynor Lewis
- Faculty: 19
- Grades: K-12
- Enrollment: 75
- Campus type: College town
- Website: www.lewisschool.org
- Thanet Lodge
- U.S. Historic district – Contributing property
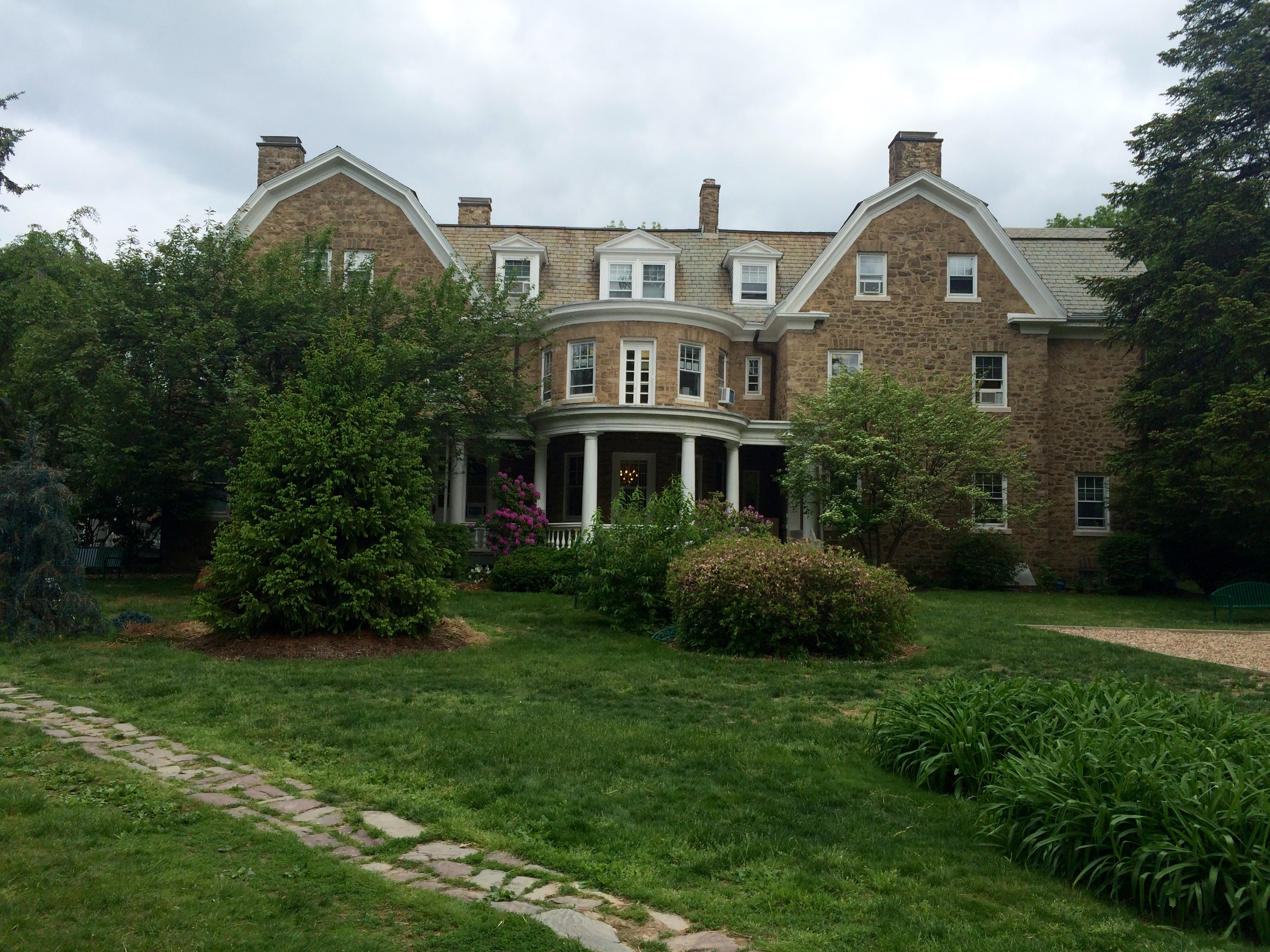
- Thanet Lodge, the 1902 home of William Libbey, now home to the Lewis School

- Location within Mercer County, New Jersey Location within New Jersey Location within the United States
- Location: 53 Bayard Lane, Princeton, New Jersey
- Coordinates: 40°21′03.4″N 74°39′55.6″W
- Built: 1902
- Part of: Princeton Historic District (ID75001143)
- Designated CP: 27 June 1975

The Lewis School of Princeton, located in Princeton, New Jersey, United States, serves students who have learning difficulties (dyslexia, dyscalculia, dysgraphia, delayed auditory and visual processing, and nonverbal learning issues). The school provides pre K-12 and college-preparatory education. The clinic functions as the diagnostic, language and learning performance unit of the facility.

== History ==
The school was founded in 1973 by Marsha Gaynor Lewis as a tutorial school and educational diagnostic facility. At that time many educators denied the existence of dyslexia. The school's continuing mission has been to help those students who are underserved in their mainstream education. The school has been consulted by clinicians from such notable facilities as Jefferson Memorial Hospital Clinic and the University of Pennsylvania in the areas of multi-sensory instruction and language based learning differences.

The school is housed in the historic Princeton mansion, Thanet Lodge, also known as Greenholm or the William Libbey house after the noted Princeton University archaeologist who built it in 1902. After Libbey's death the mansion was home to Miss Mason's School, a private elementary school, from the 1930s to 1982.
