= Westland Mansion =

- Grover Cleveland Home
- U.S. National Register of Historic Places
- U.S. National Historic Landmark
- U.S. Historic district – Contributing property
- New Jersey Register of Historic Places
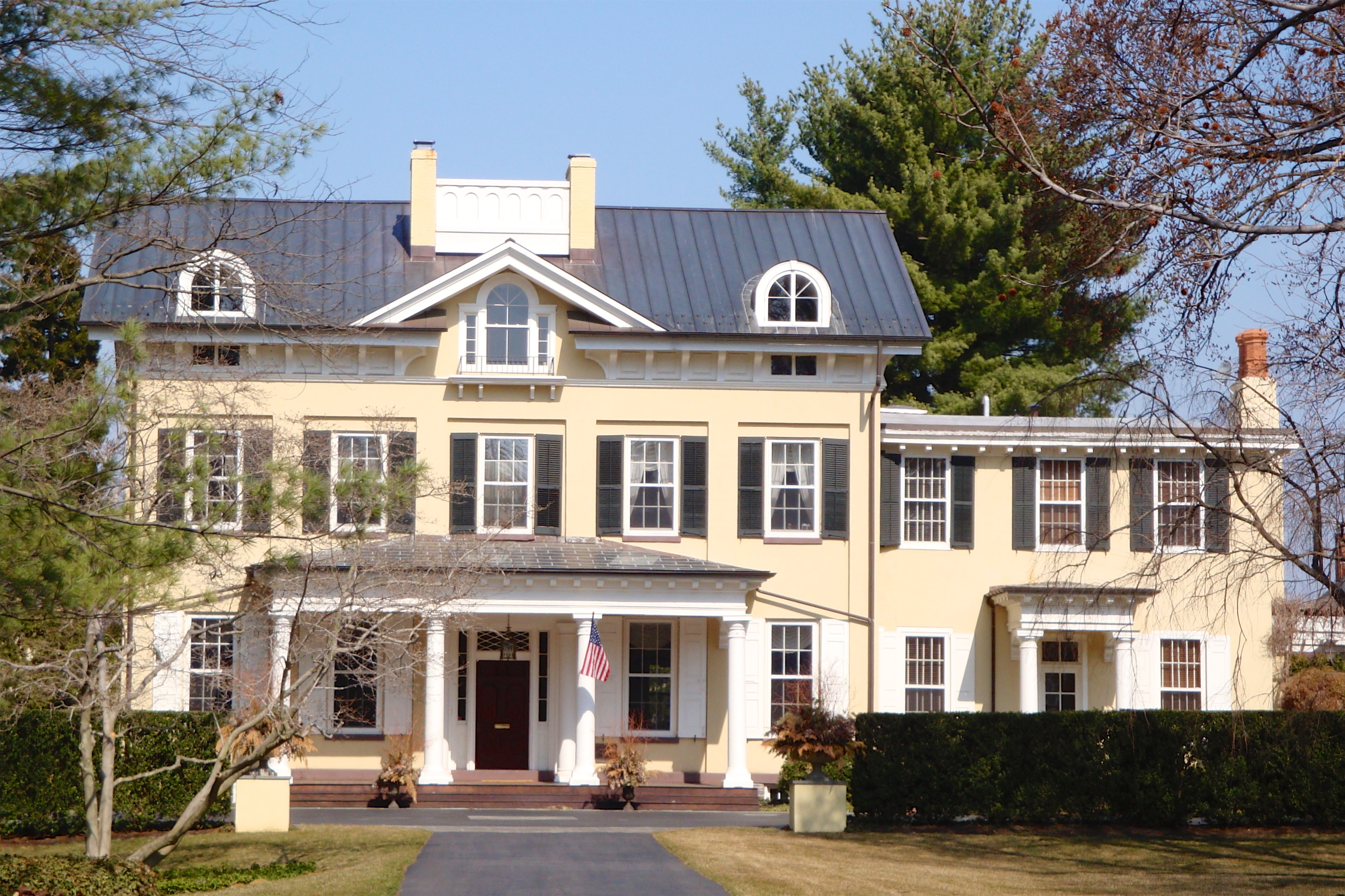
- Westland, home of Grover Cleveland, shown in 2009

- Location within Mercer County, New Jersey Location within New Jersey Location within the United States
- Location: 15 Hodge Road, Princeton, New Jersey
- Coordinates: 40°21′4.63″N 74°40′3.72″W
- Built: mid-1800s
- Part of: Princeton Historic District (ID75001143)
- NRHP reference No.: 66000463
- NJRHP No.: 1731

Significant dates
- Added to NRHP: October 15, 1966
- Designated NHL: June 23, 1965
- Designated NJRHP: May 27, 1971

Westland Mansion was the home of Grover Cleveland, the 22nd and 24th president of the United States, from his retirement in 1897 until his death in 1908. The house is located in the historic district of Princeton, New Jersey, and is a National Historic Landmark also known as the Grover Cleveland Home.

== History ==
The house was built by Robert F. Stockton in 1856. The National Park Service describes the original house, patterned after Morven (a nearby 18th-century mansion also owned by Robert Stockton) as a "2-1/2-story, stone structure covered with stucco painted yellow, [with] twin parlors on the first floor, spacious rooms, high ceilings, and handsome marble mantelpieces."

Stockton, who hailed from a prominent political family, was a United States Senator and naval commodore, notable for the capture of California during the Mexican–American War. Stockton's grandfather, Judge Richard Stockton, was a signer of the Declaration of Independence. The original structure consisted of a three-story main residence on roughly 4.5 acres of expansive lawns and fruit orchards. Later, a small wing extending from the rear of the residence was added to house servant's quarters and stables. The wing extension is now a separate home and is separated by a wall at the back of the house. Westland was originally entered from a stone roadway off of Bayard Lane (now Route 206). Nicely kept paths intersected the broad lawn, which was shaded by an assortment of massive pines. At the rear of the house was an orchard of pear and cherry trees and a dovecote to house pigeons and doves.

Purchased by Cleveland after his second term as president in 1896, the house served as home to the former chief executive from 1897 until his death in 1908. Cleveland named it "Westland" in honor of his friend Andrew Fleming West, a humanities professor at Princeton University who assisted Cleveland in securing the purchase of the home. During Cleveland's occupancy several changes were made to the residence. He added a two-story extension to the right side of the home, with the lower floor serving as his billiard room. Cleveland also made some cosmetic changes to the building's façade in the Italianate style popular at the time.

Cleveland enjoyed his retirement at Westland. Although he had never attended college, he accepted a seat on the Board of Trustees of Princeton University, a position he took seriously, chairing a committee to establish a graduate school. He gave a series of four well-attended lectures at the university, which were later published as a book. The students were fond of Cleveland, serenaded him on his birthdays and, after football games, led victory parades to his home. He also took an active part in the life of the town, maintained a brisk correspondence with friends, and kept socially and politically active. His favorite recreations were billiards and meetings of the Poverty Club, composed of a group of his comrades who played cards regularly at Westland. He died at Westland in 1908 and is buried in Princeton Cemetery. Cleveland's widow, Frances, continued to reside in the house for many years after his death.

In 2015, the building was sold for $4,325,000. The house was listed for sale in mid-2024 with an asking price of $5.95 million, and it was ultimately resold for $5.95 million in August 2025.

== Current use ==
Always a privately owned residence, the renovated building currently sits on one and a half acres. It has 6,345 square feet (589.5 m^{2}) of space across three levels, and it contains 6 bedrooms and 7 baths. The house has a formal entry, and dining and living rooms that still contain trim from Cleveland's time there. The grounds include a formal garden, pool and garage. It is not open to the public.

== See also ==
- National Register of Historic Places listings in Mercer County, New Jersey
- List of residences of presidents of the United States
