= Marquand Park =

Arboretum in Princeton, Mercer County, New Jersey

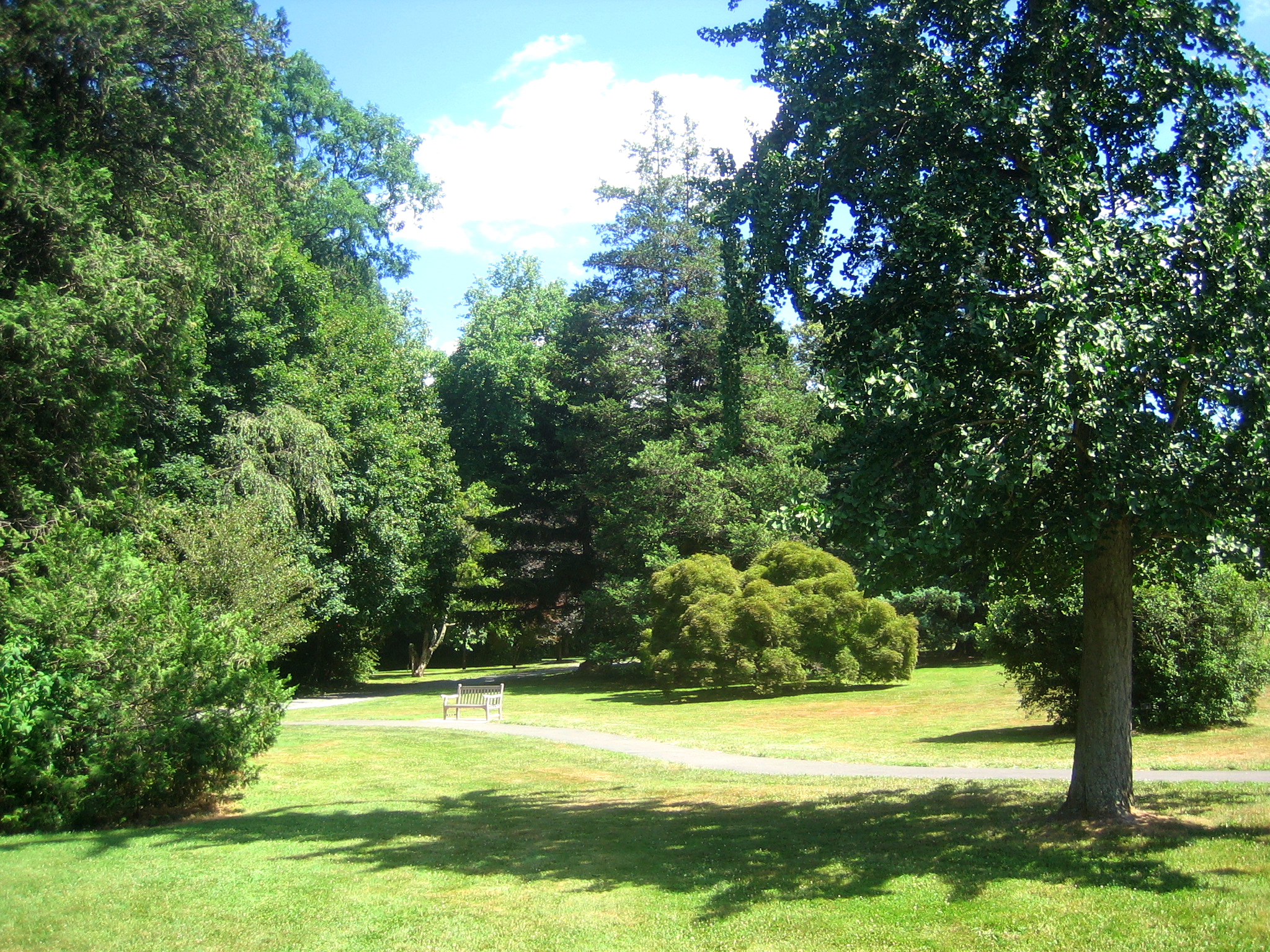
- Interactive map of Marquand Park
- Location: Lovers Lane, Princeton, NJ
- Created: 1846
- Founder: Allan Marquand
- Designer: John Notman
- Operator: The Marquand Foundation
- Species: Dawn redwood, Japanese Maple
- Public transit: Princeton Branch (The Dinky)
- Website: marquandpark.org
- Marquand Park
- U.S. Historic district – Contributing property
- Location within Mercer County, New Jersey Location within New Jersey Location within the United States
- Coordinates: 40°20′29.4″N 74°40′16.1″W
- Part of: Princeton Historic District (ID75001143)
- Added to NRHP: 27 June 1975

Marquand Park is a 17-acre (69,000 m^{2}) arboretum and recreational area located in Princeton, New Jersey. It contains walking paths, a baseball field, and attractions for children such as a sandbox and a play structure.

== History ==
Marquand Park was originally the property of the Princeton University professor Judge Richard Field, who bought 30 acres (120,000 m^{2}) of farmland in 1842 for his personal estate. Field began developing part of the estate as an arboretum, and after he died, its development continued under Susan Brown, who acquired the land in 1871, and under Princeton University Professor Allan Marquand, who acquired the property in 1885.

In 1953, 17 acres (69,000 m^{2}) of the land were given to Princeton borough by the Marquand family, and in 1955 a non-profit foundation was created to care for the park. Under the care of the Marquand Park Foundation, over 100 new species and trees of shrubs have been donated to the park or purchased by the foundation for it.

== Notable trees ==
Eight of the largest trees of their species recorded in New Jersey can be found in the park. Other well-known trees there include a dawn redwood, a critically endangered species which was thought to be extinct until a specimen was discovered in Japan in 1945, and a threadleaf Japanese Maple, which is well known for the corkscrew-like shape of its trunk and branches. (Photographs of the Japanese Maple can be found here.)
