= Charles Steadman =

American architect

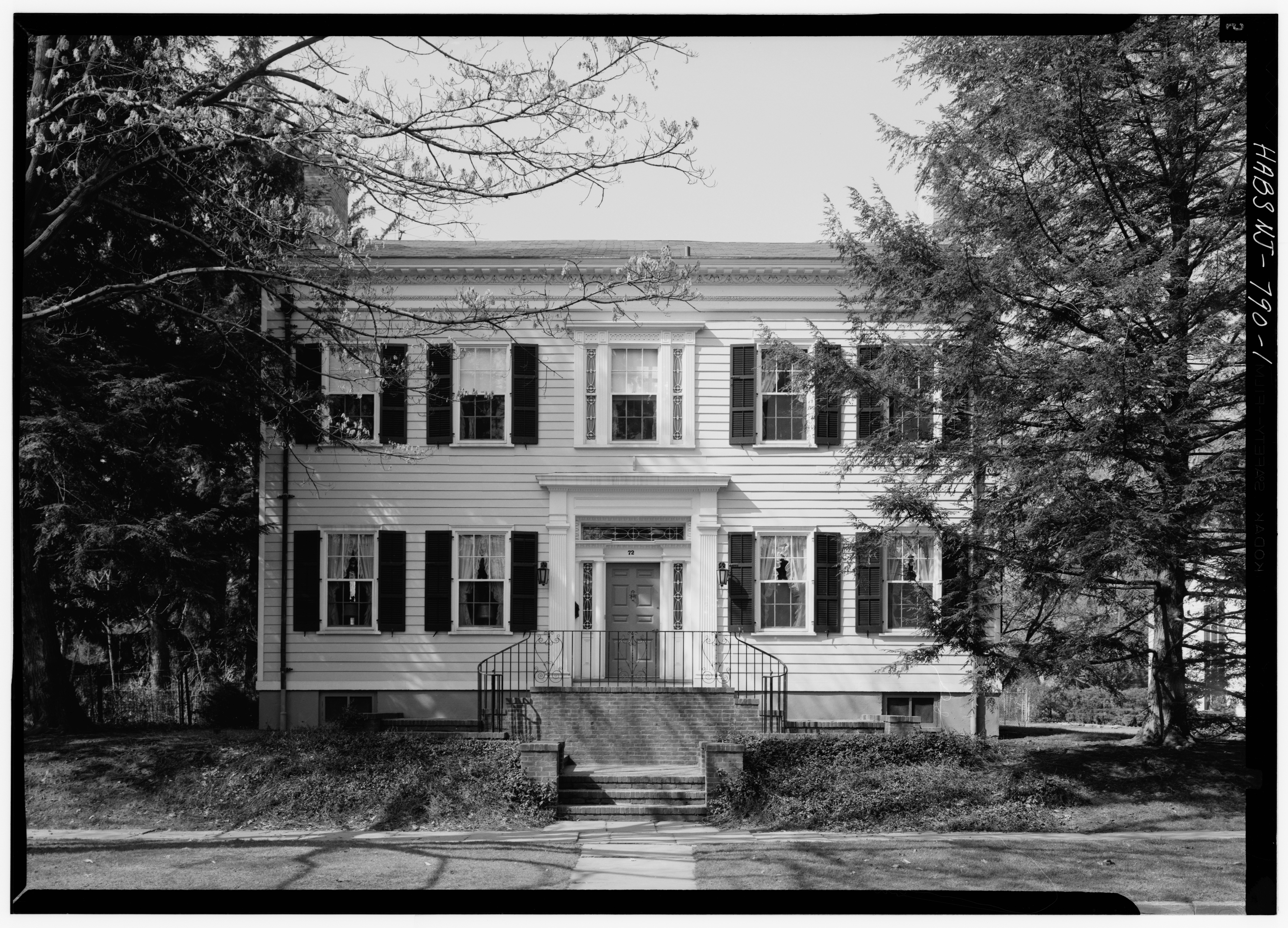
- The John Breckenridge House, designed by Steadman and one time home to Woodrow Wilson
- Born: 1790; Massachusetts
- Died: 1868 (aged 77–78); Yonkers, New York
- Occupation: Architect
- Buildings: Nassau Presbyterian Church, Miller Chapel, John Breckenridge House, Joseph Henry House, original Whig and Clio Halls

Charles Steadman (1790–1868) was an architect and builder in Princeton, New Jersey, noted for his churches, university buildings, and especially private homes. He left a significant legacy of Greek Revival buildings at Princeton University, Princeton Theological Seminary, and in the surrounding town. He has been credited with "transform(ing) Princeton from a brick and stone village into a New England–style town of wood and classical influences."

== Gallery ==
Buildings designed or built by Steadman

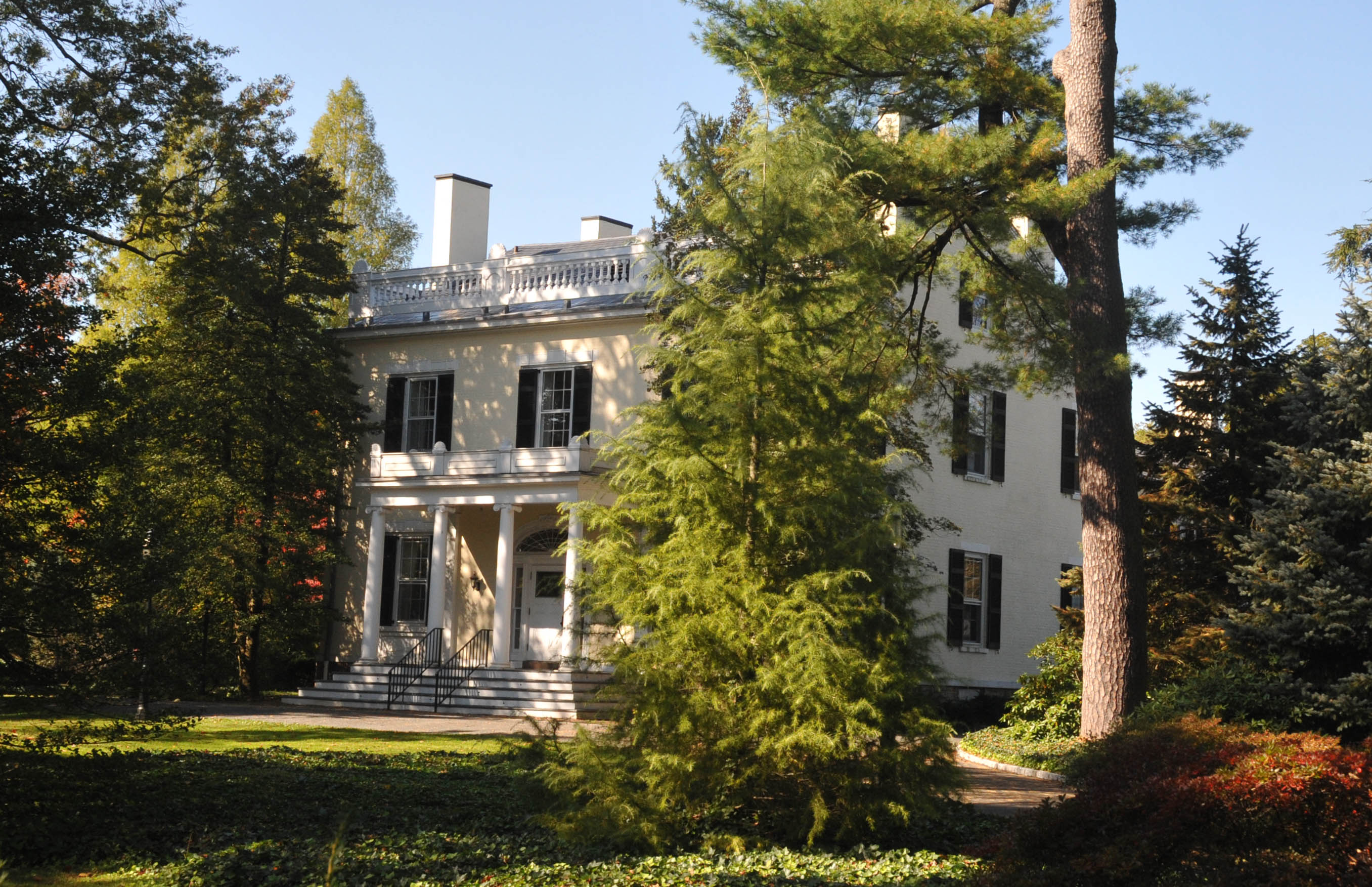
Palmer House, built for Edgar Palmer (1824)

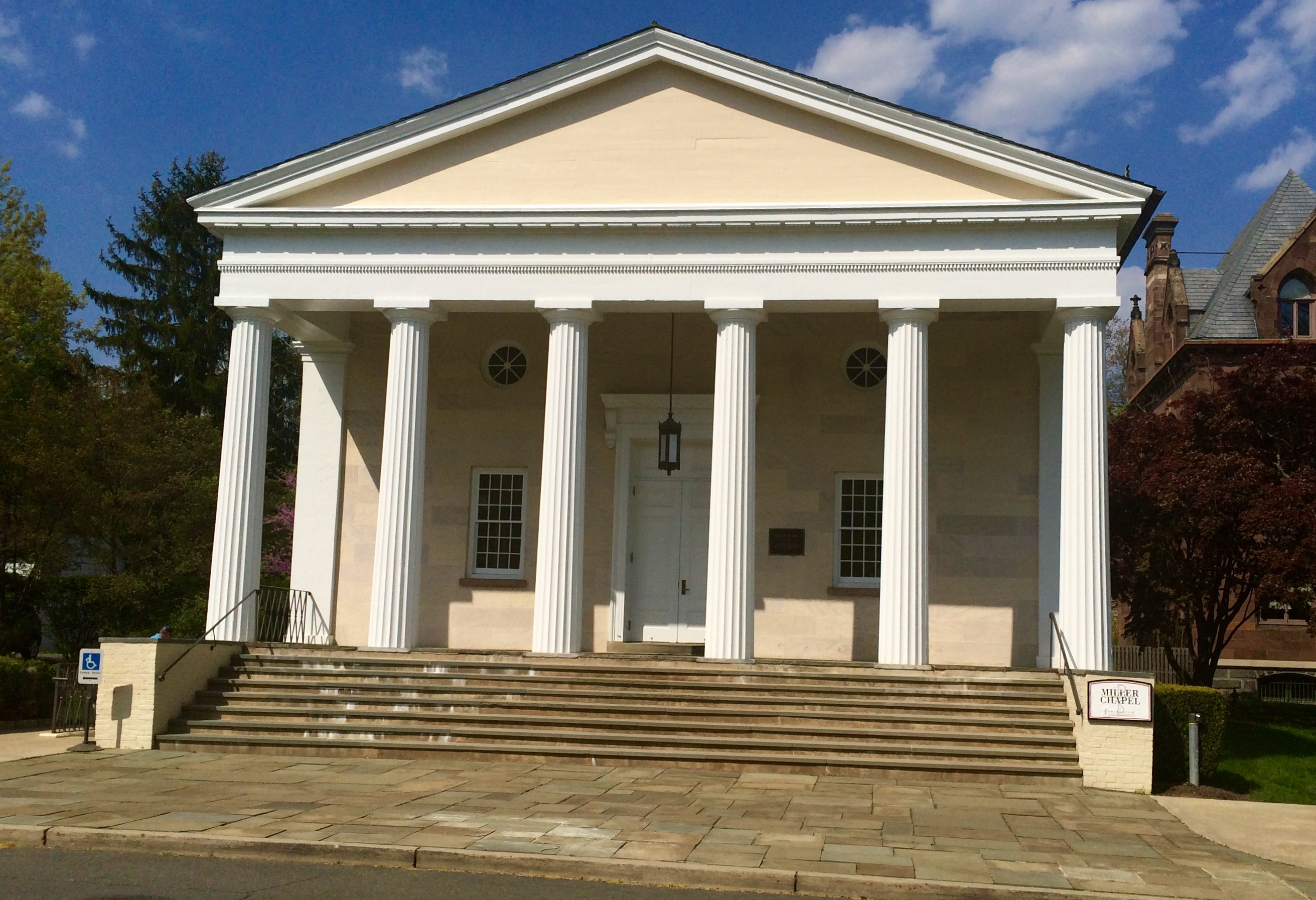
Miller Chapel at the Princeton Theological Seminary (1834)

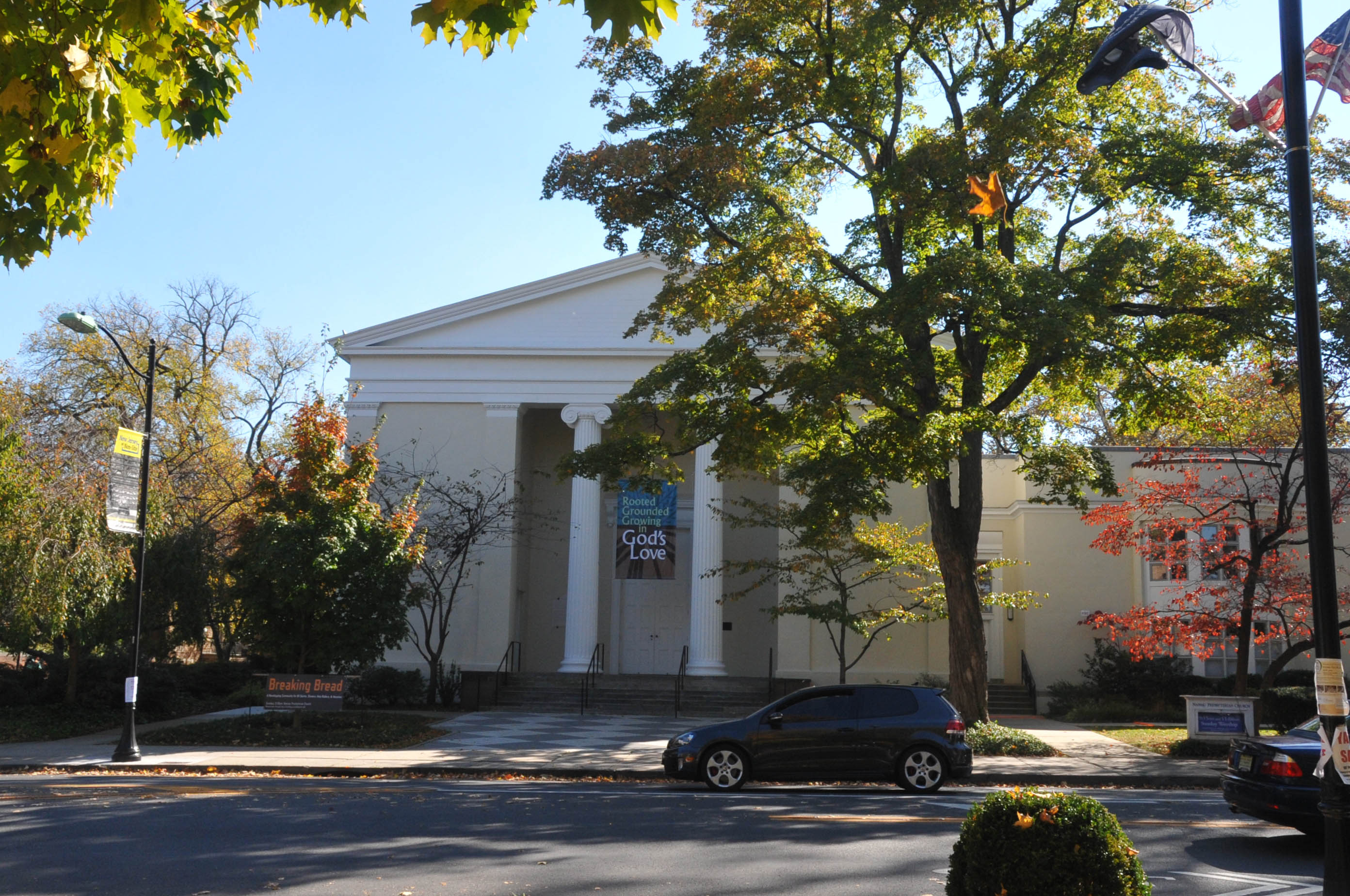
Nassau Presbyterian Church (1836)

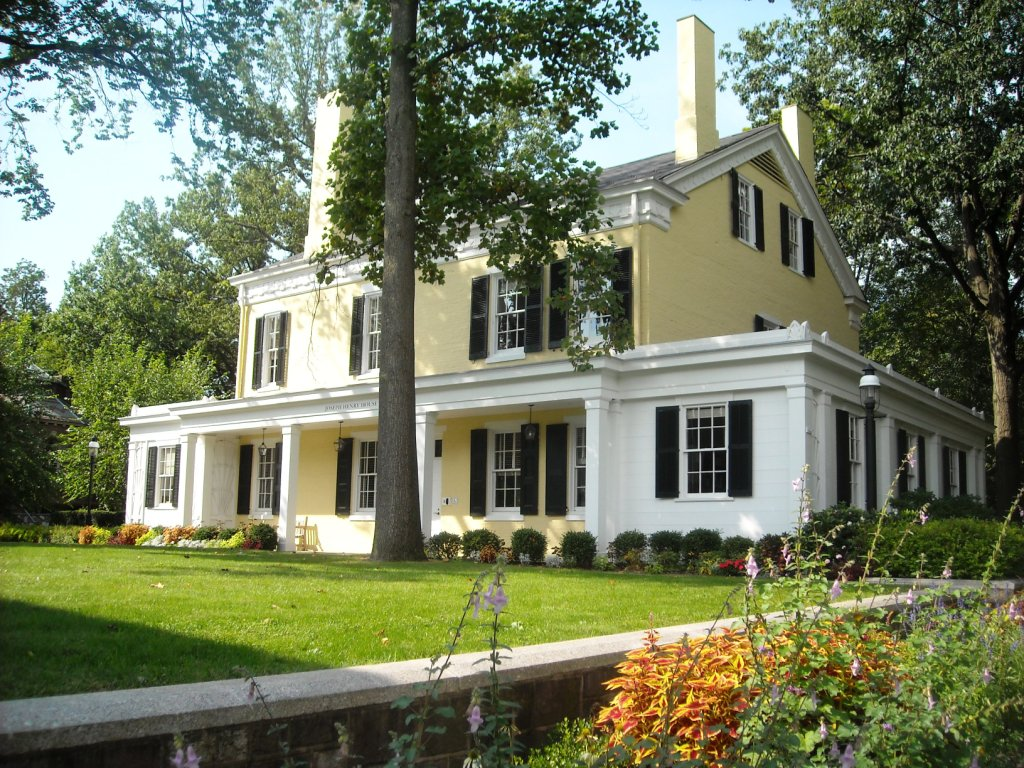
Joseph Henry House (1838) (built to Henry's design)

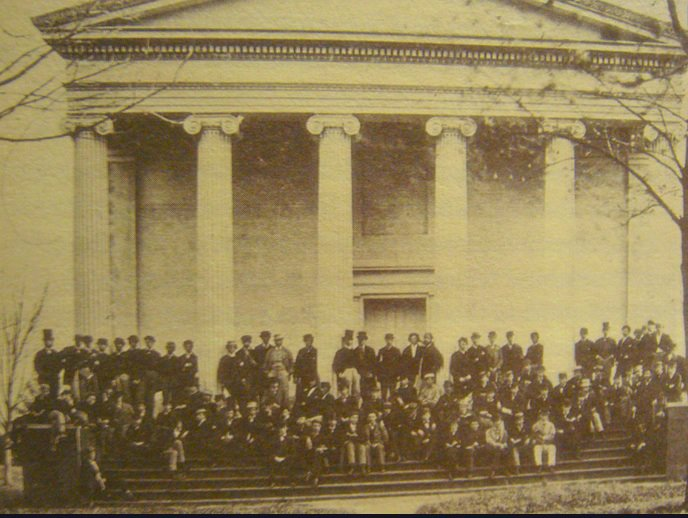
Clio Hall (1838).

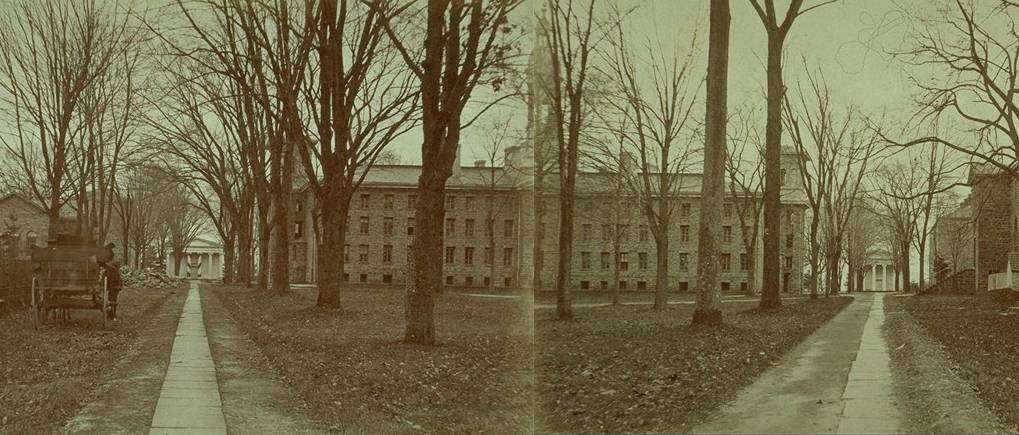
The original Whig and Clio Halls flanking Nassau Hall.
