= William Libbey =

Academic, sport shooter

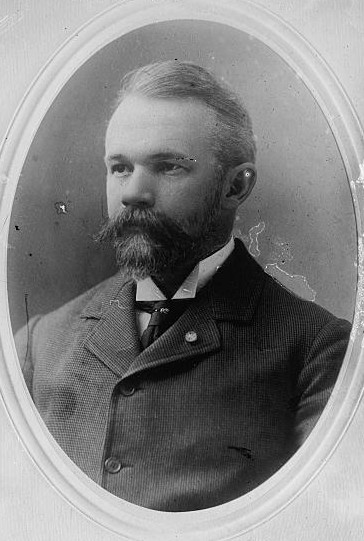
- William A. Libbey III

Medal record

Men's Shooting

Representing the United States

Olympic Games
Silver medal – second place	1912 Stockholm	team running deer, single shots

William A. Libbey III (March 27, 1855 – September 6, 1927) was an American professor of physical geography at Princeton University. He was twice a member of the U.S. Olympic Rifle Team, and rose to the rank of colonel in the New Jersey National Guard. He is also known for his first ascent of Mount Princeton in 1877. He also competed at the 1912 Summer Olympics.

== Biography ==
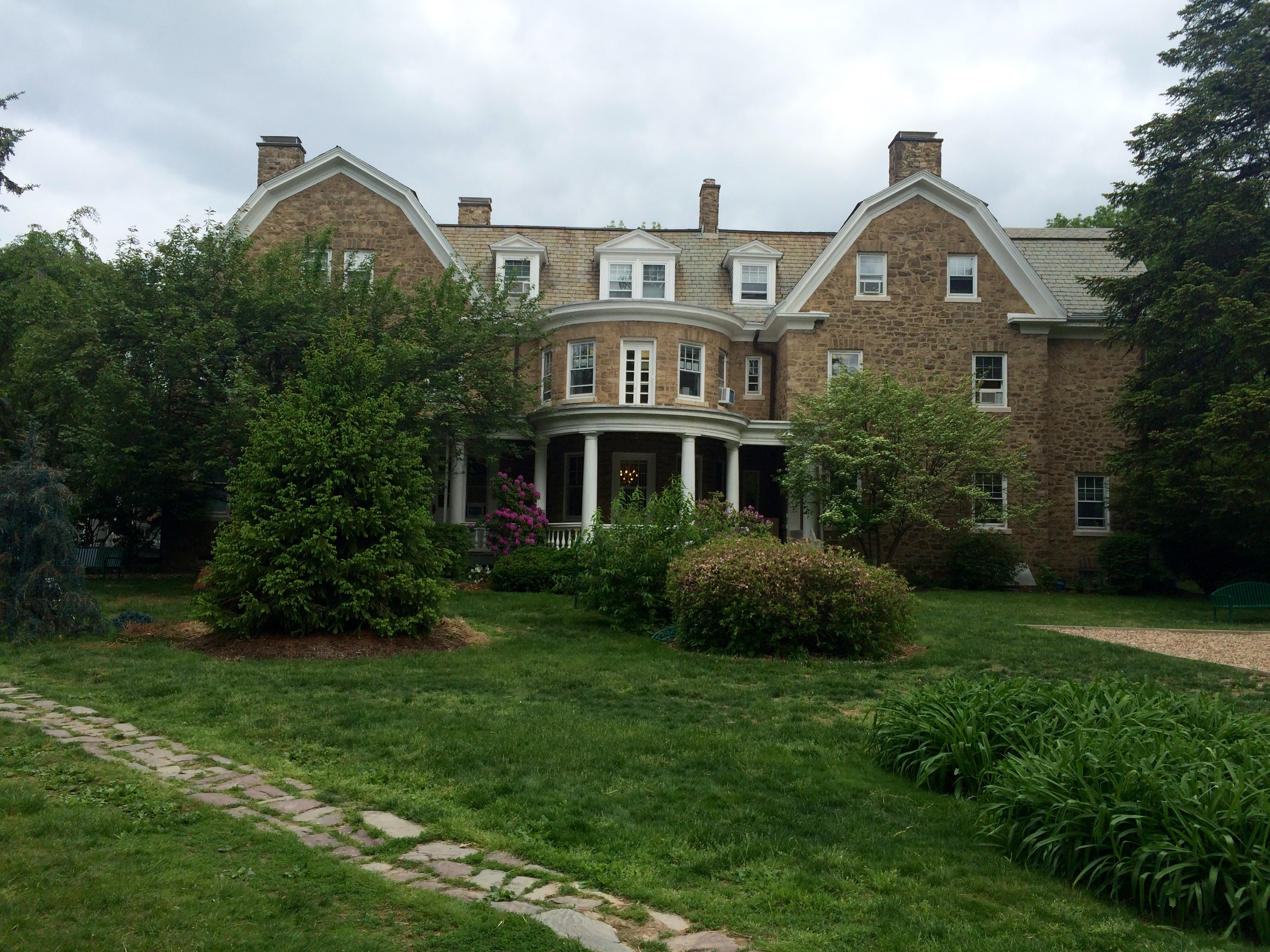
Libbey's Princeton home, Thanet Lodge, also known as Greenholm, built in 1902, now home to the Lewis School of Princeton

=== Early life ===
He was born in Jersey City, New Jersey to William Libbey, Jr., a wealthy New York City merchant, and Elizabeth Marsh (Libbey). As an undergraduate at Princeton Libbey was responsible for the adoption of orange and black as the school colors. During his freshman year he wore a tie, on a dare from classmate Melanchthon Jacobus, with the colors of William III of England, Prince of Orange-Nassau, after whom Nassau Street had been named in 1724, and later Nassau Hall in 1756. The next year he arranged for the manufacture of 1,000 yards of orange and black ribbon and proceeded to sell it, from the Grand Union Hotel, at an intercollegiate regatta in Saratoga, New York as "Princeton's colors." After the Princeton crew team won, he sold out and orange and black have been Princeton's definitive colors ever since.

=== Professor ===
Libbey graduated from Princeton in 1877 and that summer went on the Princeton scientific expedition to the West. It was there that on the afternoon of July 17, 1877, at 12:30 pm he reached the summit of Mount Princeton. Following his summer in the West, Libbey studied in Berlin and Paris.

Libbey returned and received his doctorate in geology in 1879, the first awarded by Princeton. In 1880 he was appointed as director of the Elizabeth Marsh Museum of Geology and Archaeology as well as an associate professor to teach physical geography. In 1883 he was appointed as a full professor and continued to teach the physical geography classes.

In 1897 Libbey was involved with the controversy concerning whether the Acoma people had once lived on Enchanted Mesa. After great exertion, he spent a couple of hours on the mesa top and concluded that nothing was there and that it had never been occupied. Subsequent work by archaeologists have shown that Libbey's conclusion was hasty.

Libbey was an elected member of the American Philosophical Society.

At the 1912 Summer Olympics he won the silver medal as a member of the American team in the team running deer, single shots competition.

Libbey died in Princeton, New Jersey.

=== Memberships ===
Libbey was a member of the Order of the Founders and Patriots of America, and served as its fifteenth Governor General from 1917 to 1919.

National Rifle Association of America
Preceded by James Drain	President of the NRA; 1916–1921	Succeeded by Smith W. Brookhart
