= Second Presbyterian Church =

Second Presbyterian Church may refer to:

== Northern Ireland ==
- Second Ballyeaston Presbyterian Church, a congregation of the Presbyterian Church in Ireland

== United States ==
- Second Presbyterian Church (Guilford, Baltimore, Maryland), church of Franklin L. Sheppard
- Second Presbyterian Church (Birmingham, Alabama), listed on the NRHP in Alabama
- Second Presbyterian Church (Chicago, Illinois), listed on the NRHP in Illinois
- Second Presbyterian Church (Indianapolis, Indiana)
- Second Presbyterian Church (Lexington, Kentucky), listed on the NRHP in Kentucky
- Second Presbyterian Church (St. Louis, Missouri), listed on the NRHP in Missouri
- Second Presbyterian Church (Princeton, New Jersey), merged with Nassau Presbyterian Church
- Second Presbyterian Church (Columbus, Ohio), listed on the NRHP in Ohio
- Second Presbyterian Church (Portsmouth, Ohio), listed on the NRHP in Ohio
- Second Presbyterian Church (Chattanooga, Tennessee), listed on the NRHP in Tennessee
- Second Presbyterian Church (Memphis, Tennessee) (1891), listed on the NRHP in Tennessee
- Second Presbyterian Church (Memphis, Tennessee) (1952)
- Second Presbyterian Church (Petersburg, Virginia), listed on the NRHP in Virginia
- Second Presbyterian Church (Richmond, Virginia), listed on the NRHP in Virginia
