= Franklin L. Sheppard =

Franklin L. Sheppard (1852-1930) was a well-known Christian hymn composer who set the poem, This is My Father's World, to music.

== Biography ==
Sheppard was born on August 7, 1852, in Philadelphia, Pennsylvania. Sheppard attended William Fewsmith's Classical School and the University of Pennsylvania where he graduated as valedictorian in 1872. In 1875, Sheppard moved to Boston, Massachusetts, to run the foundry for his father's stove and heater manufacturing company. Shepard attended the Zion Protestant Episcopal Church in Boston, but later switched to Presbyterianism. He eventually joined the Second Presbyterian Church in Baltimore, Maryland, and became president of the Presbyterian Board of Publications and Sabbath-School Work. In 1915, he edited the Presbyterian song book 'Alleluia,' which included the song "This is My Father's World."

In 1915 Shepard set to music, "This is My Father's World," a poem written by Maltbie Davenport Babcock, a minister from New York, who had been a close friend of Sheppard's. Sheppard, apparently did not want to call attention to himself and signed using his initials rearranged as "S.F.L." Most sources state that Sheppard adapted the music from a traditional English melody. The poem originally had sixteen verses, but Sheppard chose only three verses.

Sheppard died on February 15, 1930, in Philadelphia.
