= John Walker (organist) =

American concert organist, choirmaster and CD recording artist

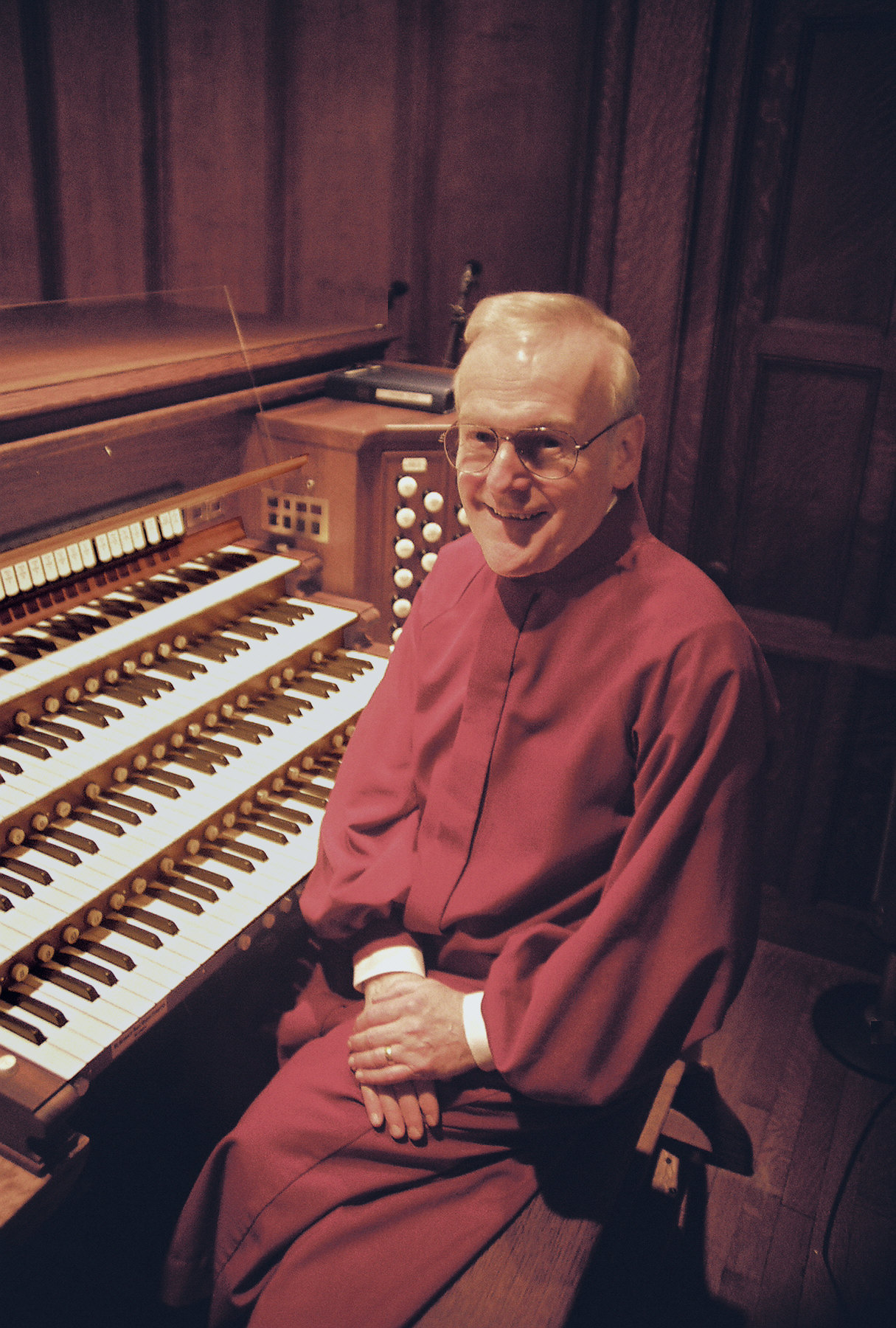
- at the E.M. Skinner pipe organ of Brown Memorial Presbyterian Church in 2008
- Born: Johnstown, Pennsylvania
- Occupations: Organist, Choirmaster, and Professor

John C. Walker, more familiarly known as John Walker, is an American concert organist, choirmaster, and CD recording artist. He is also a former president of the American Guild of Organists, elected in May 2014 to a two-year term of the 16,000-member organization. Walker has performed throughout the United States, Canada, Asia, and Europe. He is "widely recognized for his flawless technique and execution as well as his controlled and passionate playing," said Duke University in announcing a John Walker recital at Duke Chapel. From 2006 until 2025 he served on the faculty of the Peabody Institute.

== Early years and education ==
Walker, the son of a Presbyterian minister, was born November 19, 1941, in Johnstown, Pennsylvania. As a child growing up in Spring Run, Franklin County, Pennsylvania and later Fredonia, Pennsylvania, he said that he "always wished that I could be the church organist." He began fulfilling his wish while a high school freshman in Spring Run, playing as a substitute church organist at his father's church when the regular organist became ill for a month. He studied at Westminster College, Pennsylvania and at the American Conservatory of Music in Chicago where he earned two Master of Music degrees cum laude: organ and church music in 1965 and music theory in 1969. Walker then earned a Doctor of Musical Arts degree from Stanford University in 1972. His teachers, Raymond Ocock and Robert Lodine, "molded and nurtured" his career, wrote Walker. Herbert Nanney, Professor of Music at Stanford, also had a dominant role in Walker's professional growth.

== Professional career ==
Walker was professor of organ at San José State University, San Jose, California in the mid 1970s before becoming assistant organist at New York City's famed Riverside Church in 1979. He subsequently succeeded Frederick Swann as director of music and organist at Riverside Church (1983–1992). While in New York, Walker chaired the organ department of Manhattan School of Music. In 1992, he became minister of music and organist at Shadyside Presbyterian Church in Pittsburgh, Pennsylvania (1992–2004). From 2004 to December, 2011 he was minister of music and organist at Brown Memorial Presbyterian Church in Baltimore, Maryland. Upon retiring from Brown Memorial, Walker was given the title Minister of Music Emeritus in recognition of his distinguished service to the Baltimore church.

Music critics have praised Walker's organ concerts, a New York Times reviewer saying, after his recital of American organ music at Riverside Church, "His registrations were colorful and imaginative, his technical command impeccable." A Kansas City Star review of Walker's performance at (RLDS) Auditorium there said, "Anyone harboring notions of organ recitals as dull, churchy affairs obviously hasn't heard John Walker...A high-profile musical personality was never in doubt, and there was virtuosity to burn."

In addition to solo organ appearances, Walker often has performed with notable orchestras such as the San Francisco Symphony conducted by Michael Tilson Thomas. He also accompanied the New York Philharmonic in a 1990 recording of Gustav Holst's The Planets.

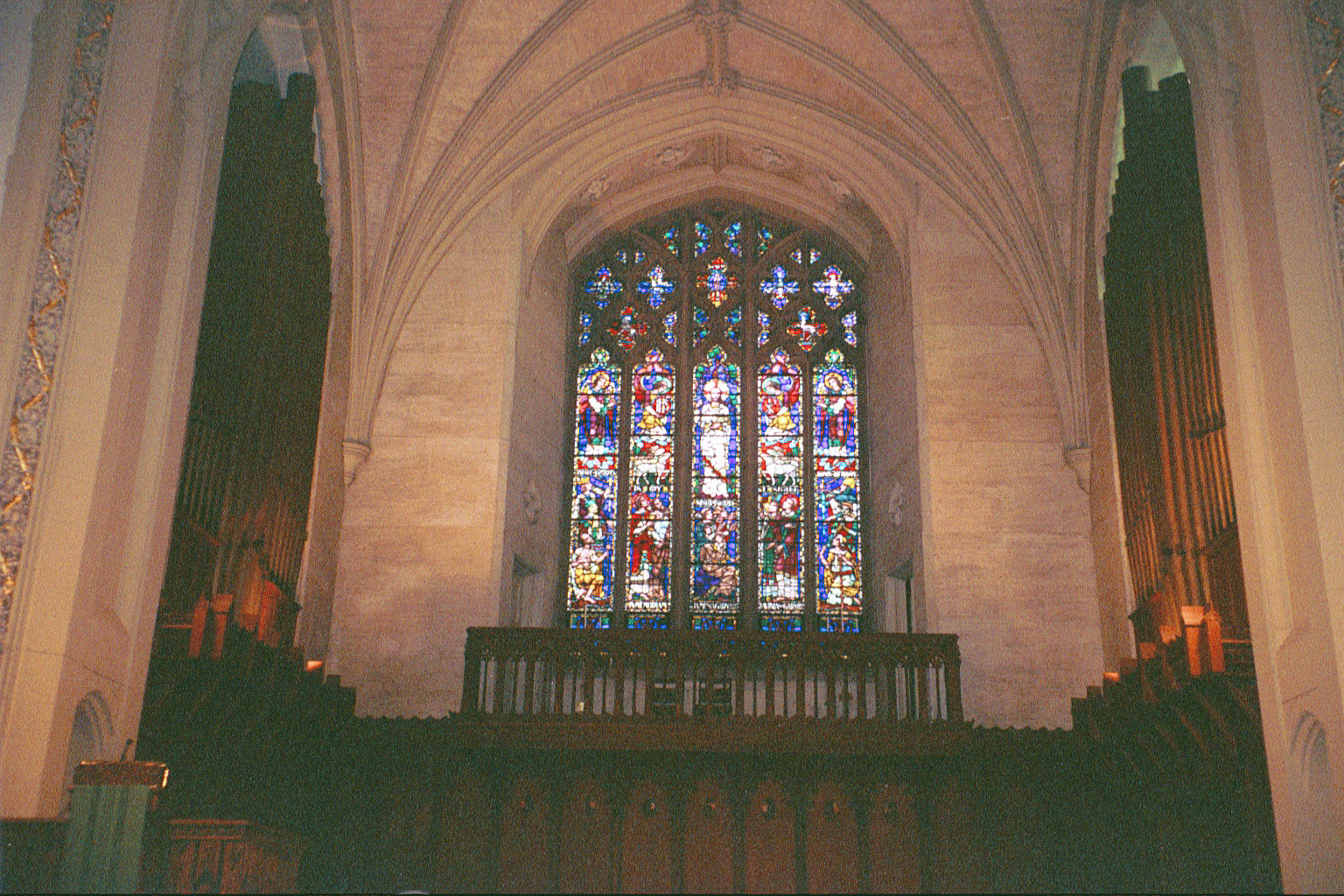
The organ divisions and chancel at Brown Memorial Presbyterian Church, where John Walker was minister of music and organist 2004–2011

Walker told a radio interviewer in 2006 that performing an organ recital for a large audience is a "great thrill," but said he finds it "more fulfilling" to play the organ for worship services. Playing for a congregation "singing with its full heart and soul," he said, "is moving beyond measure...through the way I interpret the texts in the hymns...It's a combination of being an organist, a composer, and a pastor." He told one magazine interviewer, "Service players create something meaningful and artistic by providing leadership in the liturgy, as well as congregational participation in worship."

He wrote in 2010 of "the transcendence of sacred music" calling it "decidedly countercultural—in contrast with the popular media, which equates music with star personalities, sacred music seeks only to bring worthy worship to God." The music of worship, said Walker, has "different and nobler criteria than music merely intended for the concert hall or television."

Since 2006, Walker has served as professor of organ performance at Baltimore's renowned Peabody Institute. Previously he was adjunct professor of organ and sacred music at Duquesne University (1997–2006), adjunct professor of music at Westminster College (1993–1998), and chairman of the organ department at Manhattan School of Music in New York City (1984–1992).

== Awards and honors ==
Walker in 1968 became Fellow of the American Guild of Organists (AGO), the highest level of certification granted by the organization. He also sits on the AGO Board of Examiners. On June 25, 2008 he was elected to a two-year term as AGO vice-president (July 1, 2008 – June 30, 2010). He was reelected to a second two-year term in 2010 and again to a third term in July 2012. In May 2014, he was elected president of the American Guild of Organists in a national election, installed in that position at the Guild's National Convention in Boston the last week of June 2014. As president, Walker led an organization representing more than 16,000 organists. In 2019 the American Guild of Organists presented its Distinguished Artist Award to John Walker at a Gala Recital and Reception in Pittsburgh, PA.

Walker received the Professional Achievement Award from Westminster Choir College in 1984. In 1999 he received a Fulbright Fellowship grant to become Visiting Professor in Taiwan to teach organ repertoire and hymn improvisation, along with giving frequent organ recitals. Shortly before he was to begin this series, the devastating 1999 Chi-Chi earthquake hit Taiwan on September 21 which measured 7.6 on the MMS scale. Several of Walker's performances became benefit concerts, helping to raise money for disaster relief. Returning often thereafter, Walker has made 18 concert visits to Taiwan, 3 to South Korea, and 3 to China, where he was Visiting Professor of Organ at the Shanghai Conservatory of Music.

== Discography ==
John Walker has recorded for the Pro Organo, Gothic, and JAV labels. In addition to several choral recordings, his organ discography includes:

- Reflections from Riverside, 2006
- Christmas Rediscovered, 2003
- Romance — John Walker plays the Shadyside organ, 1995
- John Walker & the Riverside Organ, 1989
- Carol Rhapsody, 1987
- John Walker, Organist — The Riverside Church, 1985
- Messiaen's L'Ascension, 1981
