= This Is My Father's World =

Christian hymn written by Maltbie Davenport Babcock

- by Maltbie D. Babcock
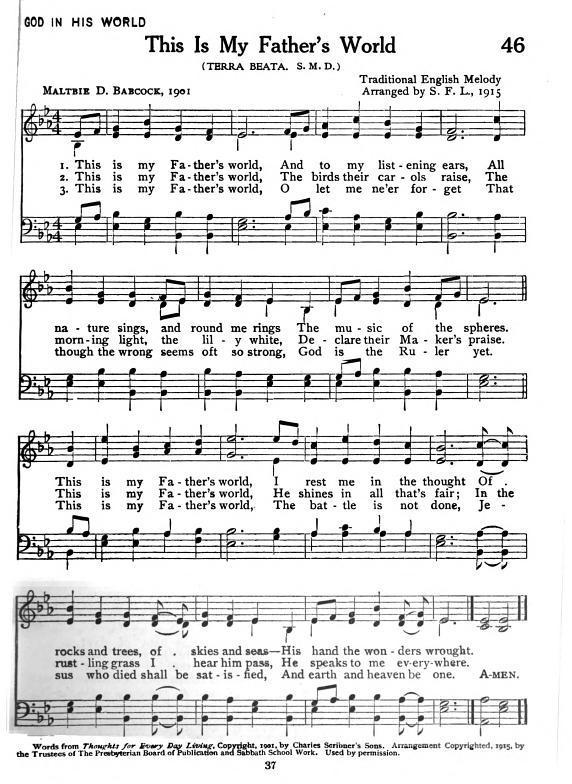
- 1919 publication of "This is My Father's World"
- Genre: Hymn
- Written: 1901
- Based on: Genesis 1:1
- Meter: 6.6.8.6 D
- Melody: "Terra Beata" by Franklin L. Sheppard

Instrumental digital recording by Robin S. Taylor, 2024.

"This is My Father's World" is a Christian hymn written by Maltbie Davenport Babcock, a minister from the Brick Presbyterian Church in New York, and published posthumously in 1901.

== History ==
When Rev. Babcock lived in Lockport, New York, he took frequent walks along the Niagara Escarpment to enjoy the overlook's panoramic vista of upstate New York scenery and Lake Ontario, telling his wife Katherine he was "going out to see the Father's world". He died in 1901 at age 42. Shortly after his death Katherine published a compilation of Babcock's writings entitled Thoughts for Every-Day Living that contained the poem "My Father's World". The original poem contained sixteen stanzas of four lines each. The poem was set to music in 1915 by Franklin L. Sheppard, a close friend of Babcock. The tune name, TERRA BEATA, means “blessed earth” in Latin. Sheppard adapted the music from a traditional English melody that he learned from his mother as a child.

== Lyrics ==
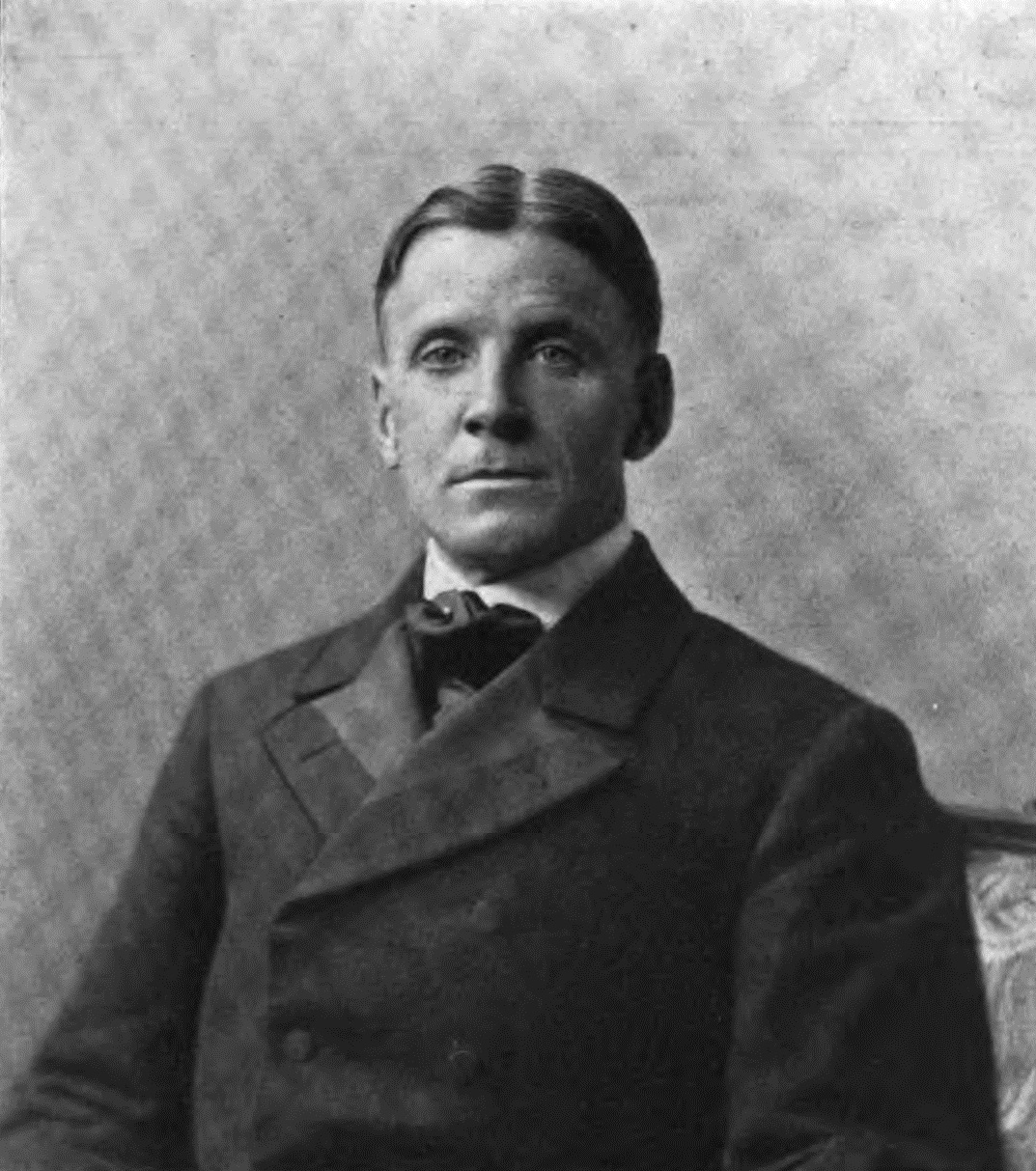
Maltbie D. Babcock

When sung as a hymn Babcock's poem usually is condensed to three to six verses, with each verse corresponding to two stanzas in the poem. An example (from the United Methodist Hymnal) uses stanzas 2-5, 14, and 16:

This is my Father's world,
And to my listening ears
All nature sings, and round me rings
The music of the spheres.
This is my Father's world:
I rest me in the thought
Of rocks and trees, of skies and seas;
His hand the wonders wrought.

This is my Father's world,
The birds their carols raise,
The morning light, the lily white,
Declare their maker's praise.
This is my Father's world,
He shines in all that's fair;
In the rustling grass I hear Him pass;
He speaks to me everywhere.

This is my Father's world.
O let me ne'er forget
That though the wrong seems oft so strong,
God is the ruler yet.
This is my Father's world:
why should my heart be sad?
The Lord is King; let the heavens ring!
God reigns; let the earth be glad!

The poem refers to several scriptures, including Jacob's exclamation "the Lord is in this place" from Genesis 28:16 and the rockfall, earthquake, and still small voice of 1 Kings 19:11–12, and the final stanza concludes by paraphrasing Psalm 96:10–11.

Some hymnals follow the 1915 setting in concluding with the 15th stanza instead: "This is my Father's world. The battle is not done. Jesus who died shall be satisfied, and earth and heav'n be one."

Another, lesser-known variation of the singable hymn (as sung by the London Philharmonic Concert Society in 1988, for example) is “This is my Father’s House”, in which the lyrics and melody remain unchanged except to sing the titular line “This is my Father’s house” in place of “This is my Father’s world”.

== In popular culture ==
An instrumental version is used in the Ken Burns documentary film, The National Parks, and the corresponding sponsorship slot for The Park Foundation.

One notable recording of the song was by Amy Grant. Her version is the opening track on her 2002 studio album Legacy... Hymns and Faith and also appears on her 2015 compilation album Be Still and Know... Hymns & Faith.

A child sings this hymn in the Criminal Minds season 1, episode 11 "Blood Hungry" in 2005.

The theme song from Penn Jillette's podcast Penn's Sunday School is based on the hymn. While Penn is an atheist, he states that this was his favorite hymn growing up.

The Orange County Supertones include the final verse in a song also titled, "This Is My Father's World" on their album Loud and Clear.

It was a popular fan theory that Howard Shore, though Jewish, had quoted the first seven notes of the hymn as inspiration in his Shire theme from the Music of The Lord of the Rings film trilogy. However, personal friends of his, and he himself in a Reddit AMA response, confirmed that he had not.

The tune appears as a recurring theme in the soundtrack of the 2004 film A Bear Named Winnie.
