= Nassau Presbyterian Church =

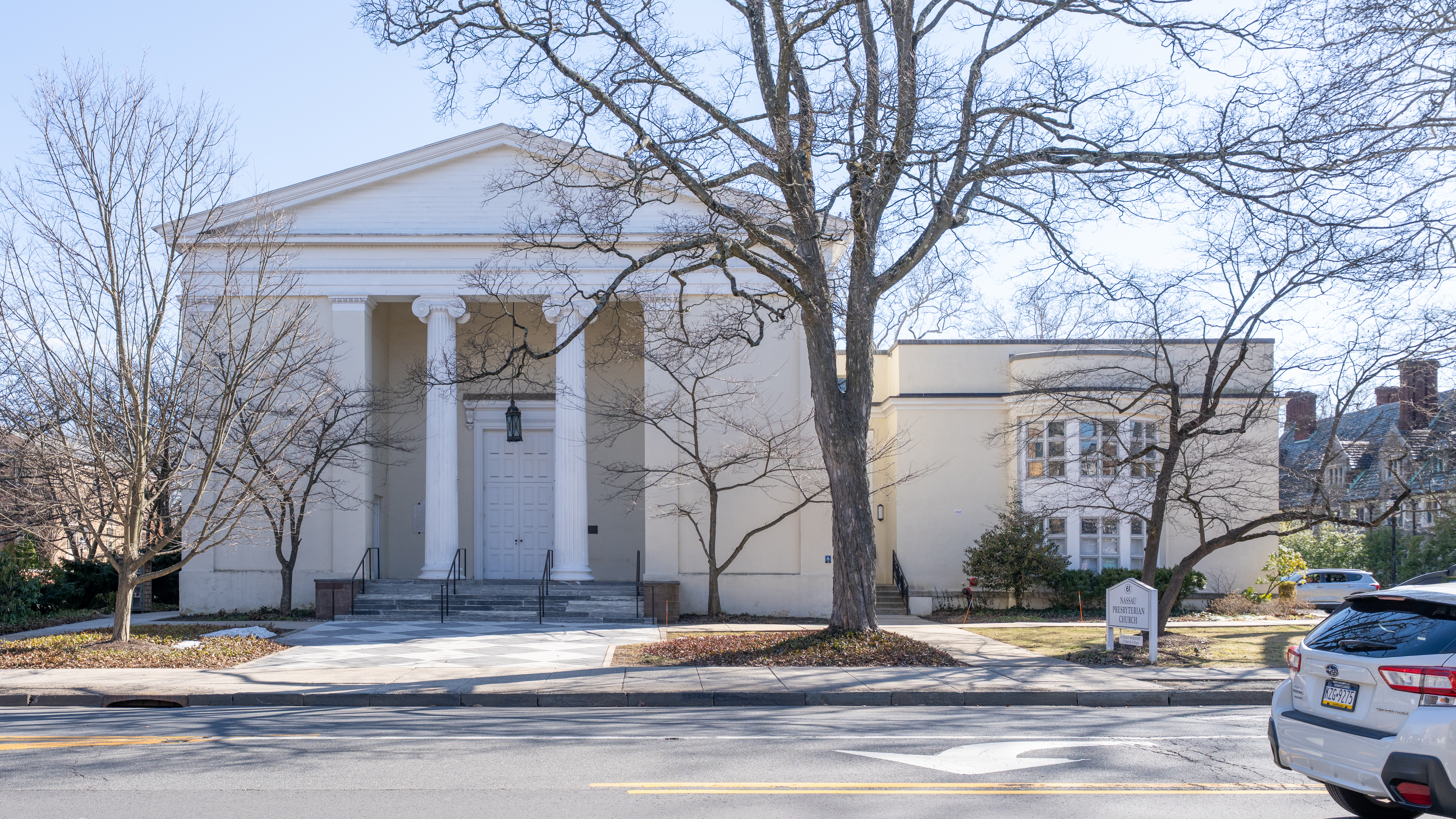
- Nassau Presbyterian Church
- Location: 61 Nassau Street, Princeton, New Jersey 08542
- Country: United States
- Denomination: Presbyterian Church (U.S.A.)
- Churchmanship: Liberal Protestant
- Website: nassauchurch.org

History
- Former name: First Presbyterian Church of Princeton
- Founded: 1766
- Events: Burned down 1813 and 1835

Architecture
- Architect: Charles Steadman
- Style: Greek Revival
- Completed: 1836
- Nassau Presbyterian Church
- U.S. Historic district – Contributing property
- Location within Mercer County, New Jersey Location within New Jersey Location within the United States
- Coordinates: 40°20′56.4″N 74°39′38.5″W
- Part of: Princeton Historic District (ID75001143)
- Added to NRHP: 27 June 1975

The Nassau Presbyterian Church is a historic congregation located at 61 Nassau Street in Princeton, New Jersey, United States. It has been the home of many important figures in the history of Presbyterianism in the United States as a result of its proximity to Princeton University and the Princeton Theological Seminary. The church operates the Princeton Cemetery and is a contributing property to the Princeton Historic District. The current pastor is the Reverend Dr. David A. Davis.

== History ==
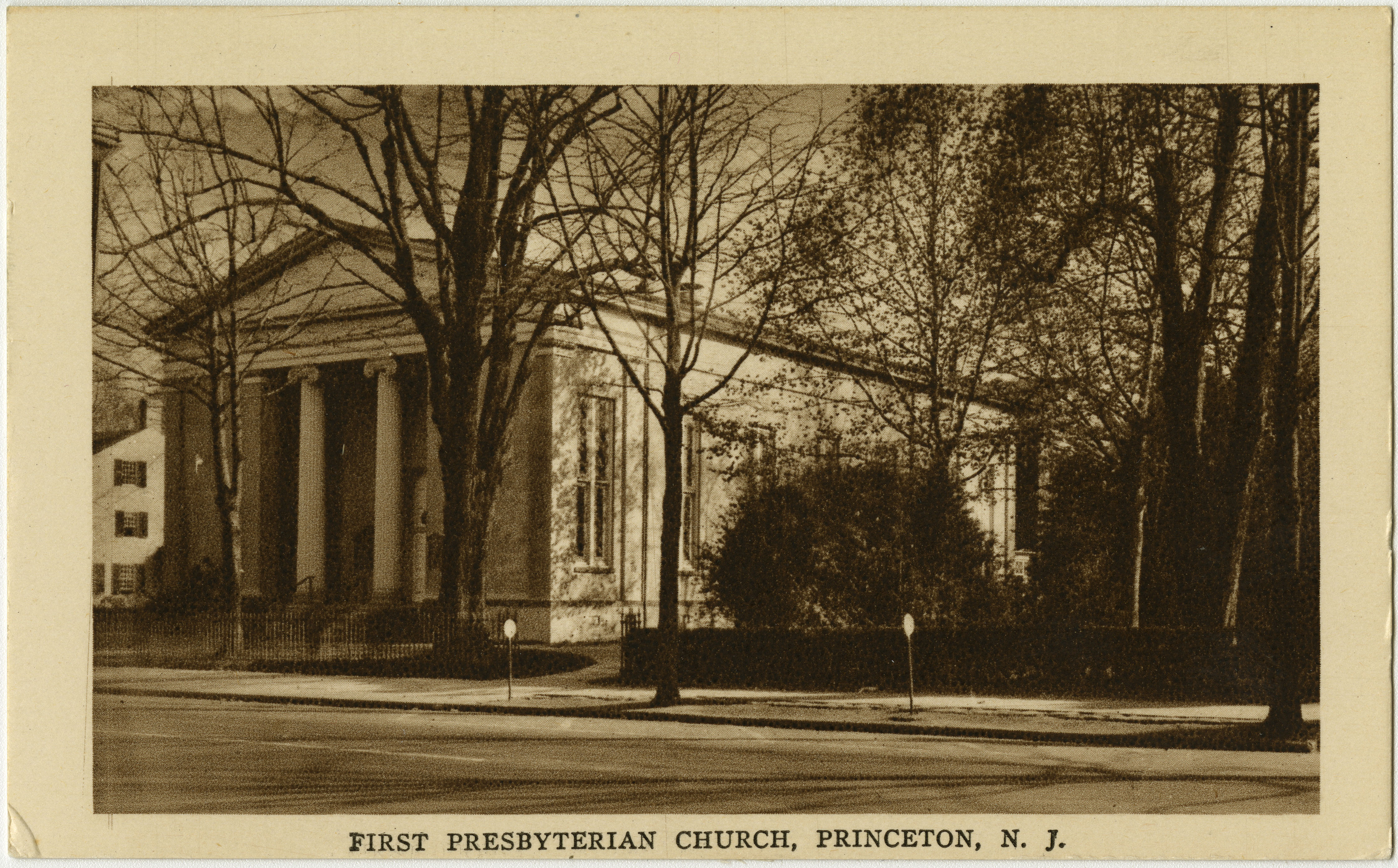
First Presbyterian Church on a vintage postcard.

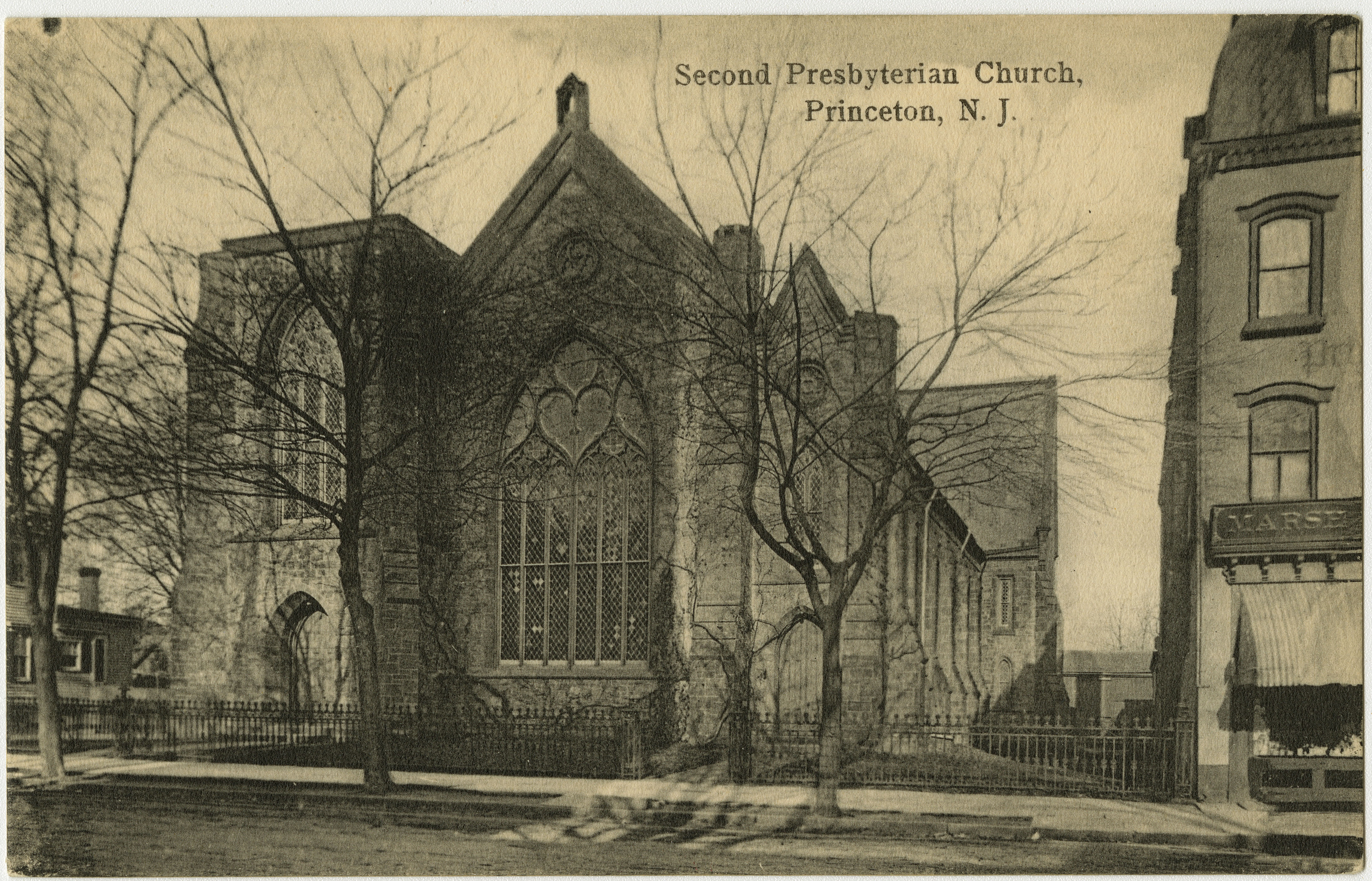
Second Presbyterian Church on a vintage postcard.

=== First Church ===
The Presbyterians of central New Jersey had two places of worship in either Lawrenceville or Kingston. In 1756 the College of New Jersey (now Princeton University) opened in Princeton and services were held in Nassau Hall. A few years later funds were collected to build a church to serve the growing population of students and teachers. The newly constructed First Presbyterian Church of Princeton opened in 1766. John Witherspoon, the President of the College, began his 25 years tenure as pastor of First Church in 1768.

=== Witherspoon Church and Second Church ===
As time progressed, divisions within the church occurred and the church spun off two local Presbyterian Churches. After the building burned down in 1835 church notes indicate that African-American members were encouraged to leave the congregation leading to the founding of Witherspoon Street Presbyterian Church. Later that same decade the Second Presbyterian Church was chartered by those who sought a less formal worship style and desired different pastoral leadership. Efforts to merge the three congregations back into one were attempted at various times over the years including an effort led by Woodrow Wilson.

=== Nassau Presbyterian Church ===
In the early 1970s, First Church and St. Andrews (the new name of Second Church) were without installed pastors. The churches decided to merge but were concerned about one church absorbing the other. The decision was made to create a new church out of the two (the Witherspoon Church was invited to the merger but declined) and Nassau Presbyterian Church was chartered in 1973. The initial congregation had 2,335 members with 1,759 and 576 coming from First and St. Andrew's, respectively. The former building of St. Andrews was sold in 1978 to a new church plant of the Assemblies of God, the Nassau Christian Center.

The church is part of the national Presbyterian Church USA.

== Notable ministers and members ==
- Grover Cleveland
- Jonathan Edwards
- John Witherspoon
- Charles Hodge
- A.A. Hodge
- James McCosh
- Joseph Ruggles Wilson
- Woodrow Wilson
- John Gresham Machen
- Charles R. Erdman, Sr.
- Bill Bradley
