= Brick Presbyterian Church (New York City) =

Church in Manhattan, New York

Coordinates: 40.784205°N 73.955139°W

The Brick Presbyterian Church
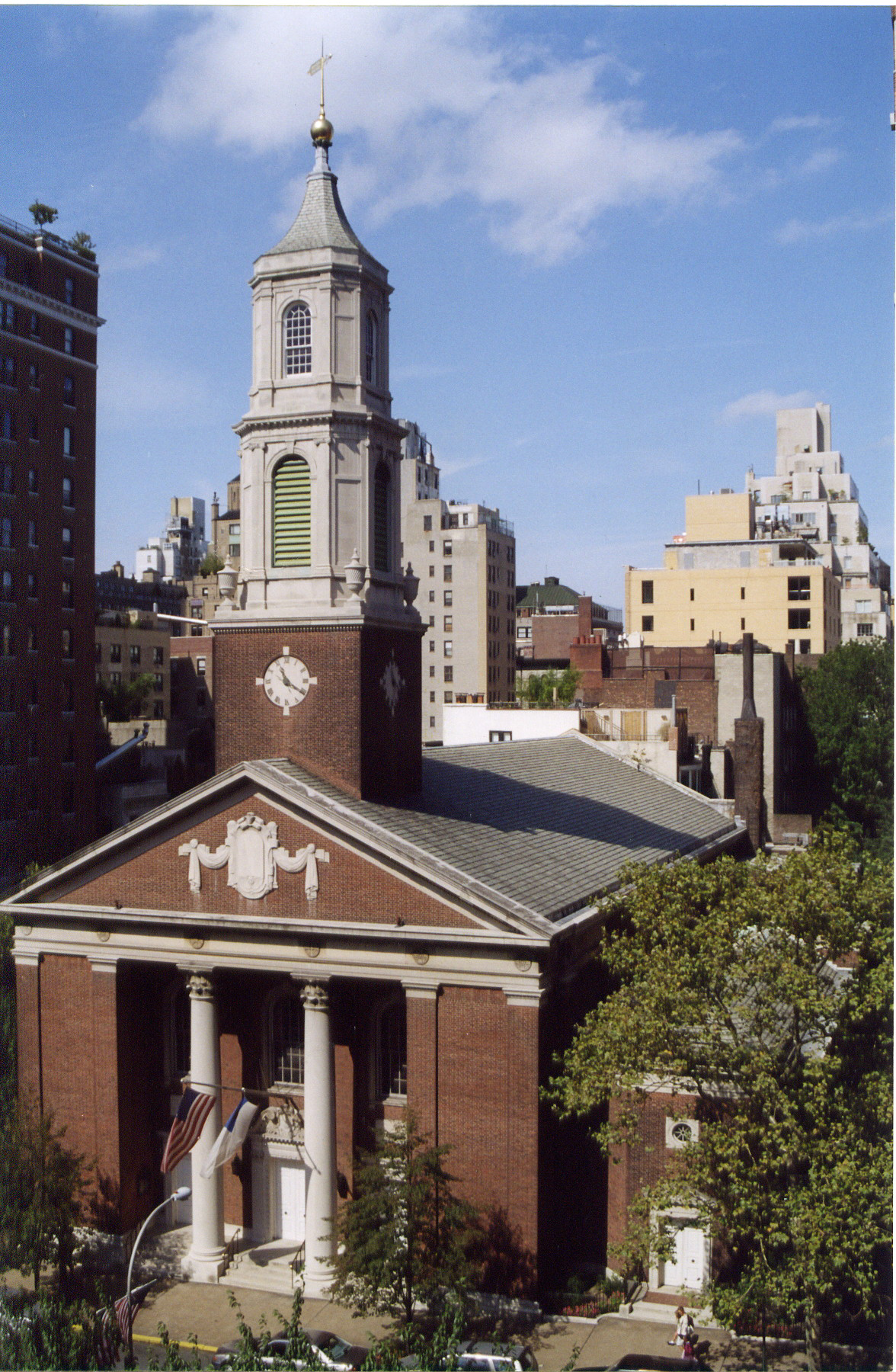
- The Brick Presbyterian Church
- Location: New York City, New York
- Country: United States
- Denomination: Presbyterian Church (USA)
- Website: www.brickchurch.org

History
- Status: Church
- Founded: June 28, 1808
- Consecrated: January 1, 1768

Architecture
- Functional status: Active

The Brick Presbyterian Church is a large congregation at Park Avenue and 91st Street on the Upper East Side of Manhattan in New York City. A congregation of the Presbyterian Church (U.S.A.), it is known for its Day School and music programs. It was founded as an offshoot of First Presbyterian Church. Its first building, in Lower Manhattan, opened in 1768. The Park Avenue location opened April 14, 1940.

== History ==
The first church building was built and designed by architect John McComb, Sr. on the corner of Beekman and Nassau Streets. It opened doors on New Year's Day in 1768. During the American Revolutionary War, the British used the church to house prisoners of war. When the congregation moved uptown, the New-York Daily Times used the site for its new headquarters, a dedicated five-story building.

In 1858, the congregation moved to a new building on Murray Hill at 37th Street and Fifth Avenue since its congregation had moved farther uptown. The dedication was on October 31.

On April 23, 1910, Mark Twain's funeral was held at the church and the Rev. Henry van Dyke Jr. officiated.

By the late 1930s, the congregation had decided to move yet farther north. The building at Fifth and 37th was sold and demolished in 1938. The church merged with Park Avenue Presbyterian Church in 1937, and the joint congregation built the 91st Street location. The church also acquired a residence on East 92nd Street to use as a Parish House.

The cornerstone to the current building was laid on November 25, 1938, in the presence of Mayor Fiorello La Guardia. The congregation first worshipped on 91st Street on April 14, 1940. The New York Times described the building as "a model of a colonial house of worship, is red brick with white trimmings and huge circular white pillars at the front."

Following the end of WWII, Mrs. Stephen C. Clark and some of her friends who had also lost sons and daughters in that war installed lighted trees along Park Avenue as a memorial not only to their children but to those from throughout the city who had given their lives. These trees were first lighted on December 17, 1945, and dedicated to the memory of those who had died in all of the U.S. wars. Subsequently, they became known as the Park Avenue Memorial Trees. Every year since, a ceremony involving caroling and the tree lighting takes place on the first Sunday in December on the Park Avenue steps of Brick Church.

== Brick Church School ==
The Brick Church School has early childhood programs and was founded in 1940. Dr. Lydia Spinelli served as Director from 1983 to 2019, followed by Amy Warden from 2019 to 2022. Marie Fabian became the Director of the school in December 2022. Members of the church are given preference in the competitive application process.

== Music ==
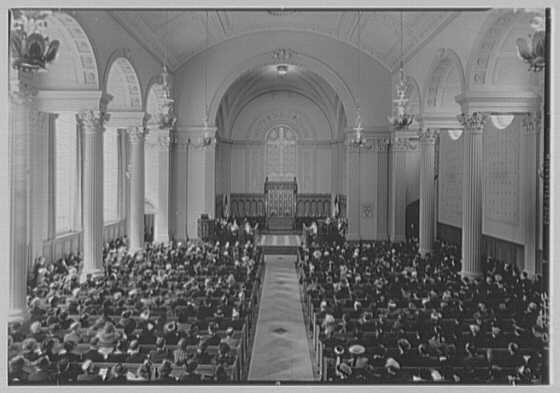
Interior of sanctuary circa 1940

Dr. Raymond Nagem has served as the Minister of Music at The Brick Church since 2021 and supervises the church's choir.

The sanctuary has a French Symphonic style organ with 6,288 pipes built by Casavant Frères of Quebec in the style of Aristide Cavaillé-Coll, a 19th-century organ maker. The sanctuary organ was given by an anonymous donor in honor of former Senior Minister Dr. Herbert B. Anderson and his wife, Mary Lou S. Anderson. It was dedicated with a recital by Dutch master Ben van Oosten in the fall of 2005.. Jean-Louis Coignet, a Parisian government employee who was in charge of the city’s organs, was a consultant on the project. There is a two manual, 26 rank mechanical action by Guilbault-Thérien in the Chapel of the Reformed Faith. This organ was installed in 1996 and is fashioned after French choir organs of the mid-19th century. The chapel organ was donated by an anonymous parishioner in recognition of Dr. T. Charles Lee and Dr. Clarence Dickinson, former organists and choirmasters of Brick Church.

== Notable clergy and members ==
- The Rev. Maltbie D. Babcock, Brick Church clergyman, also known for composing classic hymn "This Is My Father's World."
- The Rev. Henry Van Dyke, Brick Church clergyman, author, educator, and diplomat, also known for composing classic hymn "The Hymn of Joy."
- The Rev. Gardiner Spring, Brick Church clergyman, also known for writing works like "The Power of the Pulpit."
- James W. B. Benkard, senior Davis Polk partner, Supreme Court litigator, and former president of the Knickerbocker Club.
- Louise Whitfield Carnegie, wife of industrialist Andrew Carnegie.
- Katie Couric, TV presenter and journalist.
- John Foster Dulles, politician and diplomat, was an elder at the church.
- Agnes Kimball, soprano who was a musician at Brick Presbyterian in the 1910s.
- Carolyn Maloney, member of Congress.
- John McComb, Jr., architect, son of John McComb Sr., and builder of New York City Hall.
- Margaret Carnegie Miller, trustee of Carnegie Corporation of New York and daughter of industrialist Andrew Carnegie.
- Thomas J. Watson, chairman and CEO of IBM.
