= Nassau Christian Center =

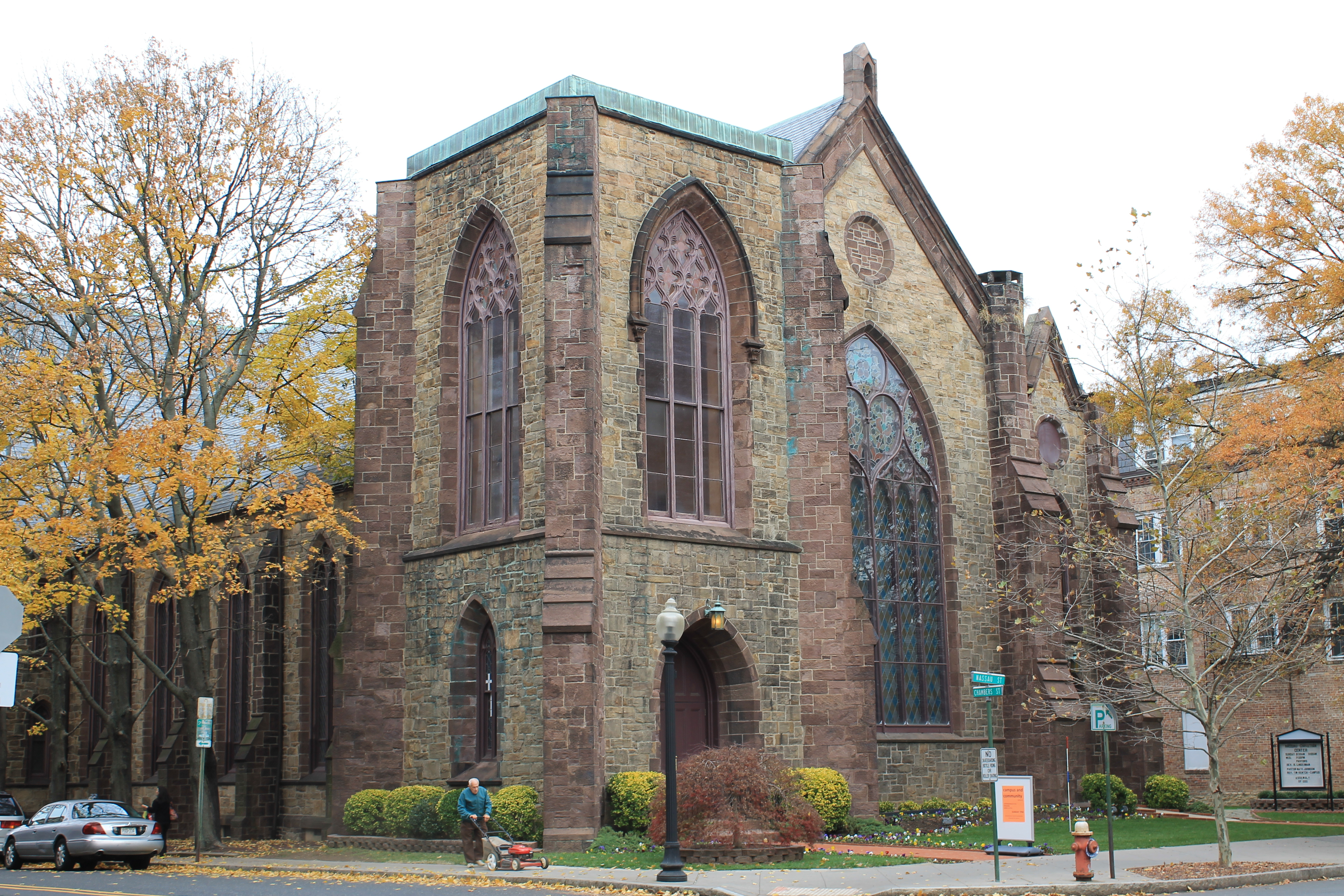
- Nassau Christian Center
- Location: 26 Nassau Street, Princeton, New Jersey
- Country: United States
- Denomination: Assemblies of God
- Previous denomination: Presbyterian Church (U.S.A.)
- Churchmanship: Pentecostal
- Website: nassauchristian.org

History
- Former name(s): Second Presbyterian (1847-1965), St. Andrew's Presbyterian (1965-1973)
- Founded: 1847 (Second Presbyterian), 1978 (Nassau Christian Center)
- Dedicated: 14 December 1868

Architecture
- Architect: Henry Leard
- Groundbreaking: 14 August 1867
- Nassau Christian Center
- U.S. Historic district – Contributing property
- Location within Mercer County, New Jersey Location within New Jersey Location within the United States
- Coordinates: 40°20′56.6″N 74°39′44.5″W
- Part of: Princeton Historic District (ID75001143)
- Added to NRHP: 27 June 1975

The Nassau Christian Center is an Assemblies of God church in Princeton, New Jersey located at 26 Nassau Street. It is housed in an historic church building built in 1868 that was once home to Princeton's Second Presbyterian Church, later known as St. Andrew's Presbyterian. The Christian Center was founded in 1978 and leased, purchasing in 1980, the then empty building from Nassau Presbyterian Church, which had been formed by the merger of Second Presbyterian with First Presbyterian of Princeton in 1973.

== Gallery ==
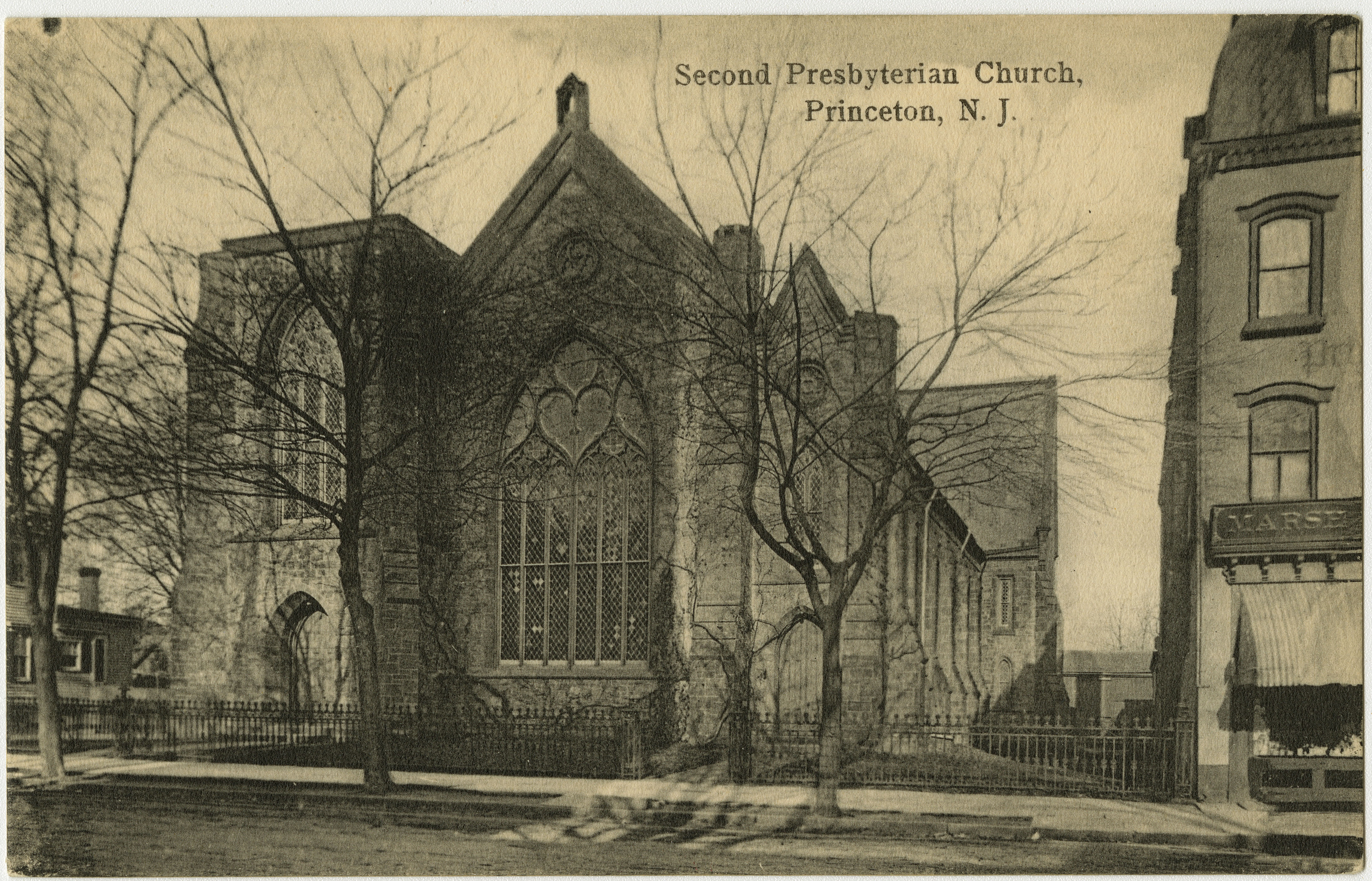
Second Presbyterian Church, now home to the Nassau Christian Center, on a vintage postcard

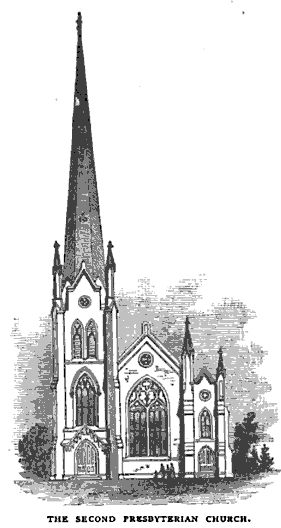
The original plan for the church, including the unbuilt spire
