= Maltbie Davenport Babcock =

American clergyman and writer (1858–1901)

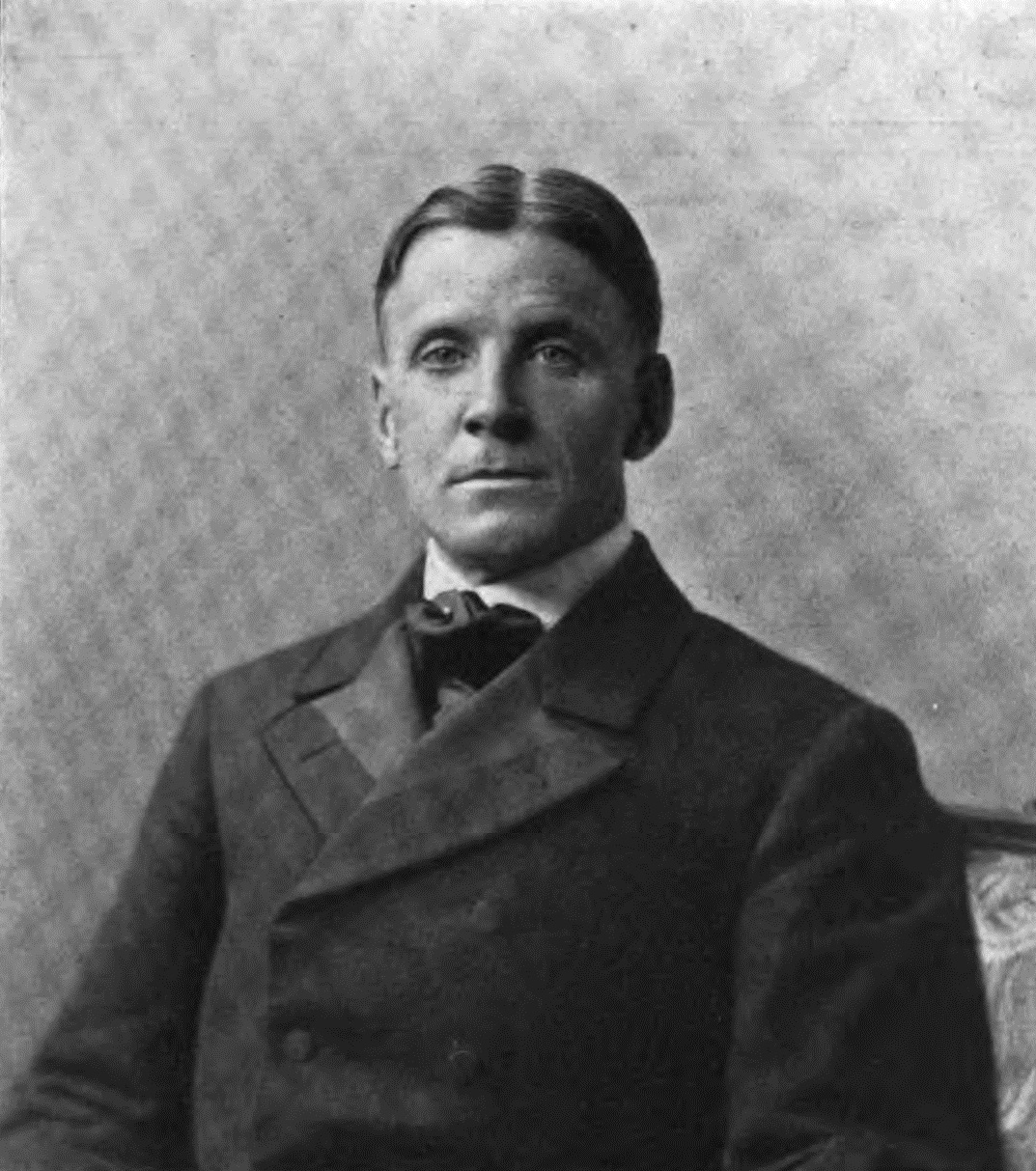
- Born: August 3, 1858; Syracuse, New York, U.S.
- Died: May 18, 1901 (aged 42); Naples, Italy
- Education: Syracuse University; Auburn Theological Seminary
- Occupation: Clergy
- Spouse: Katherine Eliot Tallman (m. 1882)
- Children: 2

Maltbie Davenport Babcock (August 3, 1858 – May 18, 1901) was a noted American clergyman and writer of the 19th century. He authored the familiar hymn, This is My Father's World, among others.

== Early life ==
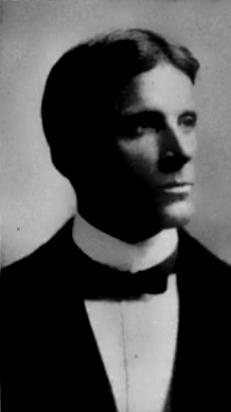
Babcock as a young man

Babcock was born at Syracuse, New York, eldest son of Henry and Emily Maria (Maltbie) Babcock. His first American ancestor was James Babcock (1612–1679), a native of England, who emigrated in 1642, settling first at Portsmouth, Rhode Island and then in Westerly, where his descendants became prominent. Maltbie Davenport Babcock's great-grandfather, Henry Davis, was second president of Hamilton College, and his grandfather, Rev. Ebenezer Davenport Maltbie, was also a Presbyterian minister of note. As a young man, Babcock was described as "tall and broad-shouldered" and a muscular swimmer and baseball player.

Maltbie Babcock was educated in the public schools of Syracuse and graduated in 1879 from Syracuse University with highest honors. He played Baseball on the university's ball team and was a member of the Psi Upsilon Fraternity. He was selected to give the Alumni Address in 1895. He studied theology at the Auburn Theological Seminary, receiving his degree there in 1882.

== Ministry ==
Upon receiving his degree in theology in 1882, Babcock became pastor of a church at Lockport, New York. He was described as having "an unusually brilliant intellect and stirring oratorical powers that commanded admiration, [that] won for him a foremost place among the favorites of his denomination".

From 1887 to 1900, Babcock was senior minister of the prestigious Brown Memorial Presbyterian Church in Baltimore, Maryland. While pastoring Brown Memorial, he was acclaimed for his oratory and use of colorful metaphors in his sermons. He also led a fund-raising effort to assist Jewish refugees from Russia who were victims of an anti-Jewish pogrom in the 1880s. Babcock was honored by a Doctor of Divinity degree from Syracuse University in 1896.

He was called to the Brick Church of New York City in 1900, where his annual compensation was approximately $30,000. So popular was he that many prominent Baltimoreans, including the faculty of Johns Hopkins University, unsuccessfully implored Babcock to remain at Brown instead of accepting the call to Brick Presbyterian Church. A 1910 biography said of him,

"Babcock was preeminently a preacher. He was a clear thinker and a fluent speaker, with a marvelous personal magnetism which appealed to all classes of people, and the influence of which became in a sense national. His theology was broad and deep, yet without a touch of present-day uncertainty. Added to the genius of spirituality he had the genius of work, and it was owing to his unselfish devotion to the great work of uplifting mankind that he literally wore himself out and died at the early age of forty-two. Noted for his impartial charity, he reached people in countless ways and exerted everywhere a remarkable personal magnetism. While he published no books he may be said to have 'lived, or sung his thoughts'.
"Nothing better gauges the tenor and spirit of the man than a sentence found on the fly-leaf of his pocket Bible after his death: 'Committed myself again with Christian brothers to unreserved docility and devotion before my Master'. He wrote a number of fugitive poems, said to resemble those of Emerson, which were published in connection with a memorial volume of extracts from sermons, addresses, letters and newspaper articles, entitled 'Thoughts for Every-Day Living' (1902). Dr. Babcock was a musician of rare talent and wrote some hymns of unusual beauty."

== Personal life ==
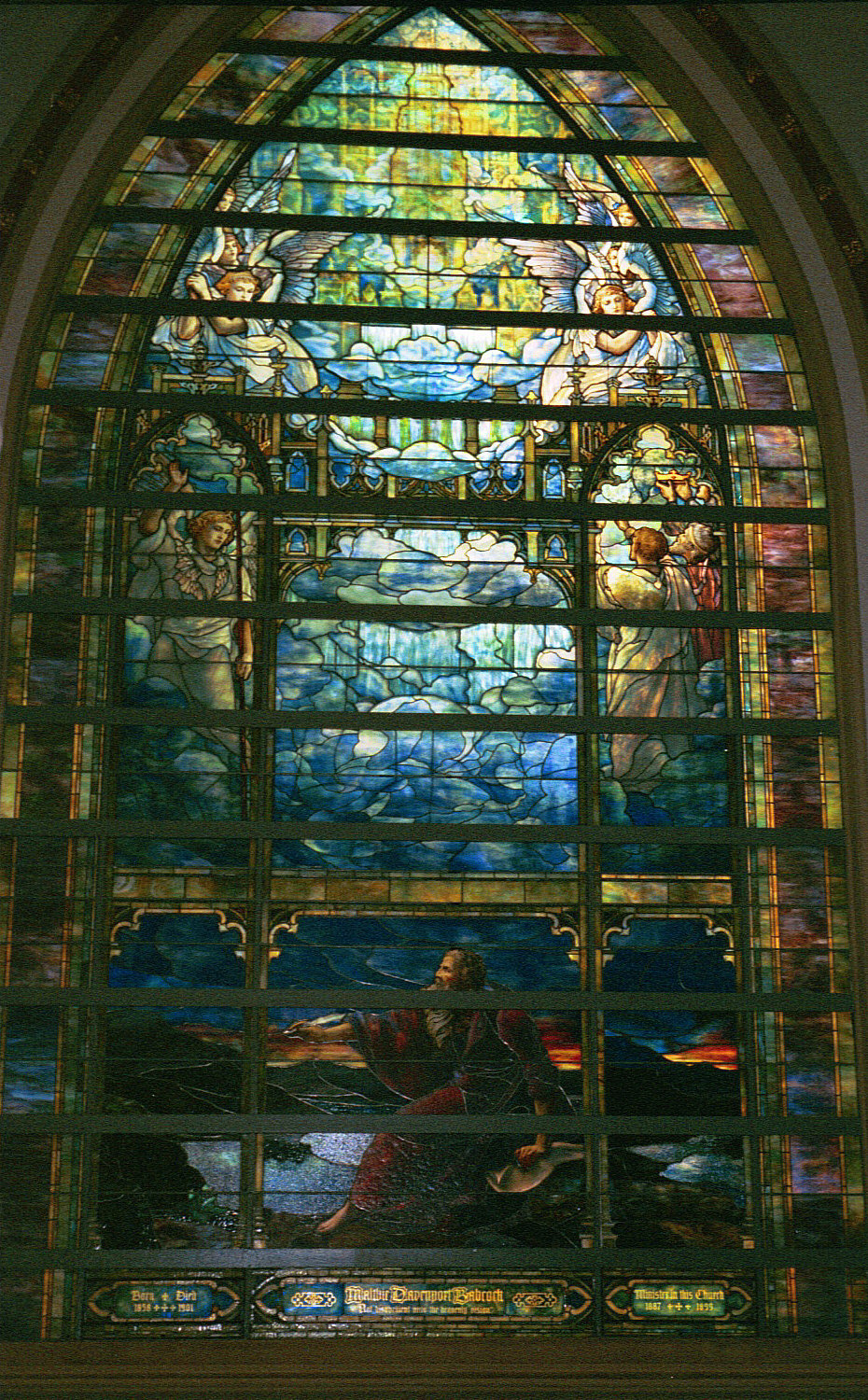
The Holy City by Louis Comfort Tiffany, honoring Babcock at Brown Memorial Presbyterian Church

On October 4, 1882, he married Katherine Eliot Tallman, the youngest daughter of John Peck Higgins Tallman a prominent lawyer of Poughkeepsie, New York. They had two children, both of whom died in infancy:

- Edward Anderson Babcock (d. August 21, 1883)
- John Tallman Babcock (d. February 11, 1890)

Babcock died at age 42 in Naples, Italy, on May 18, 1901, returning from a trip to the Holy Land. According to a New York Times report of May 20, 1901, and widely carried by newspapers coast-to-coast, he died by suicide after slitting his wrist and ingesting "corrosive sublimate" (mercuric chloride). He was being treated in the International Hospital in Naples for what was called "Mediterranean fever," an archaic term for brucellosis. Several of his travel companions suffered from this bacterial infection which causes fever, pain and depression. Babcock had been hospitalized for "nervous prostration" (depression) in Danville, New York, ten years before his death.

At his funeral in New York City, the presiding clergyman eulogized him, "We do not need a candle to show a sunbeam...The work our brother has done — the life he lived speaks for him." In Baltimore, a memorial service was held on June 2, 1901, where he was eulogized by various prominent educators, including Daniel C. Gilman, the first president of Johns Hopkins University, John Goucher, the founder of Goucher College, and Francis L. Patton, president of Princeton University. Babcock was praised as "always wise, patient, sympathetic and inspiring". He is buried at Oakwood Cemetery in Syracuse, New York.

=== Legacy ===
When Babcock lived in Lockport, he took frequent walks along the Niagara Escarpment to enjoy the overlook's panoramic vista of upstate New York scenery and Lake Ontario, telling his wife he was "going out to see the Father's world". She published a poem by Babcock shortly after his death, entitled This is My Father's World. Now sung as a well-known hymn, its verses are:

This is my Father's world, and to my listening ears all nature sings, and round me rings the music of the spheres.
This is my Father's world: I rest me in the thought of rocks and trees, of skies and seas; his hand the wonders wrought.
This is my Father's world, the birds their carols raise, the morning light, the lily white, declare their maker's praise.
This is my Father's world, he shines in all that's fair; in the rustling grass I hear him pass; he speaks to me everywhere.
This is my Father's world. O let me ne'er forget that though the wrong seems oft so strong, God is the ruler yet.
This is my Father's world: why should my heart be sad? The Lord is King; let the heavens ring! God reigns; let the earth be glad!

A large stained glass window was installed in 1905 at Brown Memorial Presbyterian Church in Babcock's memory. The Holy City, by Louis Comfort Tiffany, depicts St. John's vision of the "New Jerusalem" described in Revelation 21:2. It has brilliant red, orange, and yellow glass etched for the sunrise, with textured glass used to create the effect of moving water. It is said to be one of the two largest windows crafted by Tiffany.

One of the most popular references to his legacy is the Babcock Road in San Antonio, Texas.

== Select works ==
- Thoughts for every-day living from the spoken and written words of Maltbie Davenport Babcock (1901), posthumously, OCLC 1557510
- Letters from Egypt and Palestine (1902), posthumously, OCLC 563549
