= List of memorials to George Washington =

This is a list of memorials to George Washington, the commander-in-chief of the Continental Army during the American Revolutionary War and first president of the United States.

== Federal holiday ==
Washington's Birthday has been a federal holiday in the United States since 1879.

== States, counties, and townships ==
One state, 31 counties, and 241 civil townships in the United States are named for George Washington.

Place	Type
Washington	state
Washington County	30 counties
Washington Parish, Louisiana	county equivalent
Washington Township, Arkansas	11 townships
Washington Township, North Dakota	township
Washington Township, South Dakota	3 townships
Washington Township, Illinois	3 townships
Washington Township, Michigan	3 townships
Washington Township, Nebraska	4 townships
Washington Township, New Jersey	5 townships
Washington Township, Ohio	43 townships
Town of Washington, Wisconsin	7 township equivalents
Town of Port Washington, Wisconsin	township equivalent
Lake Washington Township, North Dakota	township

== Municipalities and inhabited areas ==
Place	State	Type
Washington, D.C.	N/A	capital city and federal district
Washington	Arkansas	city
Washington	Georgia	city
Washington	Illinois	city
Washington	Indiana	city
Washington	Iowa	city
Washington	Kansas	city
Washington	Missouri	city
Washington	North Carolina	city
Washington	Pennsylvania	city
Washington	Utah	city
Washington	Connecticut	town
Washington	Louisiana	town
Washington	Maine	town
Washington	Massachusetts	town
Washington	New Hampshire	town
Washington	New York	town
Port Washington	New York	CDP
Washington	Oklahoma	town
Washington	Vermont	town
Washington	Virginia	town
Washington	Kentucky	village
Washington	Nebraska	village
Washington	New Jersey	borough
Washington	Mississippi	unincorporated community
Washington	Wisconsin	unincorporated community
Washington	West Virginia	CDP
Port Washington	Wisconsin	city
Fort Washington	Pennsylvania	city
North Washington	Iowa	city
Washington Court House	Ohio	city
Washington Terrace	Utah	city
Mount Washington	Kentucky	city
Mount Washington	Massachusetts	town
Washington Grove	Maryland	town
Washington Park	North Carolina	town
Washington Park	Illinois	village
Port Washington North	New York	village
Little Washington	Virginia	village
Port Washington	Ohio	village
Old Washington	Ohio	village
New Washington	Ohio	village
Washingtonville	Ohio	village
Washingtonville	New York	village
Washingtonville	Pennsylvania	borough
New Washington	Pennsylvania	borough
East Washington	Pennsylvania	borough
Washington Valley	New Jersey	unincorporated community
Washington Crossing	New Jersey	unincorporated community
Washington Crossing	Pennsylvania	unincorporated community
Washington-on-the-Brazos	Texas	unincorporated community
Washington Mills	Iowa	unincorporated community
Washington Prairie	Iowa	unincorporated community
Fort Washington	Maryland	CDP
Fort Washington	California	CDP
New Washington	Indiana	CDP
George	Washington	city
Georgetown	Kentucky	CDP

== Institutions ==
- George Washington University in Washington, D.C.
- Washington and Jefferson College in Washington, Pennsylvania
- Washington and Lee University in Lexington, Virginia
- Washington College in Chestertown, Maryland
- Washington High School (disambiguation), several institutions
- Washington University in St. Louis, Missouri

== Forts ==
- Fort Washington, New York. A fortified position near the north end of Manhattan Island during the American Revolutionary War
- Fort Washington, Ohio. A frontier outpost at Cincinnati
- Fort Washington, Massachusetts. A still-extant earthworks fortification in Cambridge, Massachusetts from the 1775–1776 Siege of Boston
- Fort Washington, Maryland
- Fort Washington, Pennsylvania. Headquarters during the December 5–8, 1777 Battle of White Marsh. Now a state park.

== Estates ==
- Washington Place, Honolulu, private residence of Queen Liliʻuokalani of Hawaiʻi

== Geological features ==
- Lake Washington
- Mount Washington
- Washington Peak
- Washington Park
- Washington Heights
- Washington Island (Wisconsin)

== Species ==
- Palm genus Washingtonia

== Parks ==
- Washington's Crossing, National Historic Landmark
  - Washington Crossing State Park, New Jersey
  - Washington Crossing Historic Park, Pennsylvania
- Washington Park, Florida
- Washington Park, Illinois
- Washington Park, North Carolina
- Washington Place (Baltimore) – part of a set of four matching squares/parks around the circle of the Washington Monument. Washington Place are the two squares/parks along Charles Street's north–south axis, and the intersecting other squares/parks are along East and West Monument Street, also known as Mount Vernon Place on the east–west axis, in the north Baltimore neighborhood of Mount Vernon.
- Washington Square Park, New York City
- Washington Square Park, Philadelphia
- Washington Square (Salt Lake City)

== Neighborhoods ==
- Mount Washington, Baltimore
- Washington Heights, Chicago
- Washington Heights, Manhattan
- Washington's Landing, Pittsburgh
- Washington Park, Atlanta
- Washington Square West, Philadelphia
- Washington Terrace, St. Louis
- Washington-Wheatley, Kansas City

== Transportation ==
- George Washington Bridge, crossing the Hudson River between New Jersey to New York
- George Washington Memorial Parkway in Washington, D.C., maintained by the U.S. National Park Service
- Washington Bridge, across the Harlem River in New York City
- Washington Bridge (Providence) in Providence, Rhode Island
- Washington Crossing Bridge, across the Delaware River
- Washington Crossing Bridge (Pittsburgh), in Pittsburgh, Pennsylvania
- Washington Circle in the District of Columbia
- Washington Avenue (disambiguation), several streets

== Monuments ==
=== United States ===
==== Washington, D.C. ====
- Copy (c. 1815) after Bust of George Washington by Giuseppe Ceracchi (1795), White House.
- Enthroned Washington (1840), by Horatio Greenough, for the United States Capitol. Now in the National Museum of American History.
- Washington Resigning His Commission (c. 1841), by Ferdinand Pettrich, Smithsonian American Art Museum
- Washington Monument (1848–84), Robert Mills, architect, National Mall. The best-known monument to Washington.
- Equestrian statue of George Washington (1860), by Clark Mills, Washington Circle
- The George Washington University (1904). Founded as Columbian College (1821), the name was changed in agreement with the George Washington Memorial Association (1904). Statues in University Yard and elsewhere on main campus.
- Copy (1909) after George Washington by Jean-Antoine Houdon (1791), United States Capitol rotunda
- Copy (1932) after George Washington by Jean-Antoine Houdon (1791), George Washington University
- Copy after George Washington by Jean-Antoine Houdon (1791), Larz Anderson House
- Copy after George Washington by Jean-Antoine Houdon (1791), inside the Washington Monument
- George Washington (1934–65), by Lee Lawrie, Washington National Cathedral
- Stained glass window of George Washington at Prayer (1954–55), Congressional Prayer Room, United States Capitol
- George Washington on Horseback (1959), by Herbert Haseltine, Washington National Cathedral
- Bust of George Washington (1975), by Avard Fairbanks, George Washington University
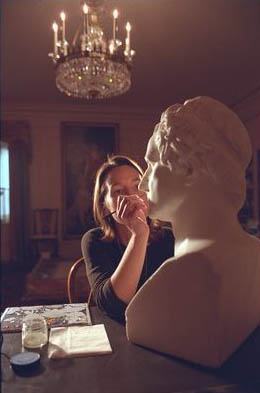
Copy (c. 1815) after Bust of George Washington by Giuseppe Ceracchi (1795), White House

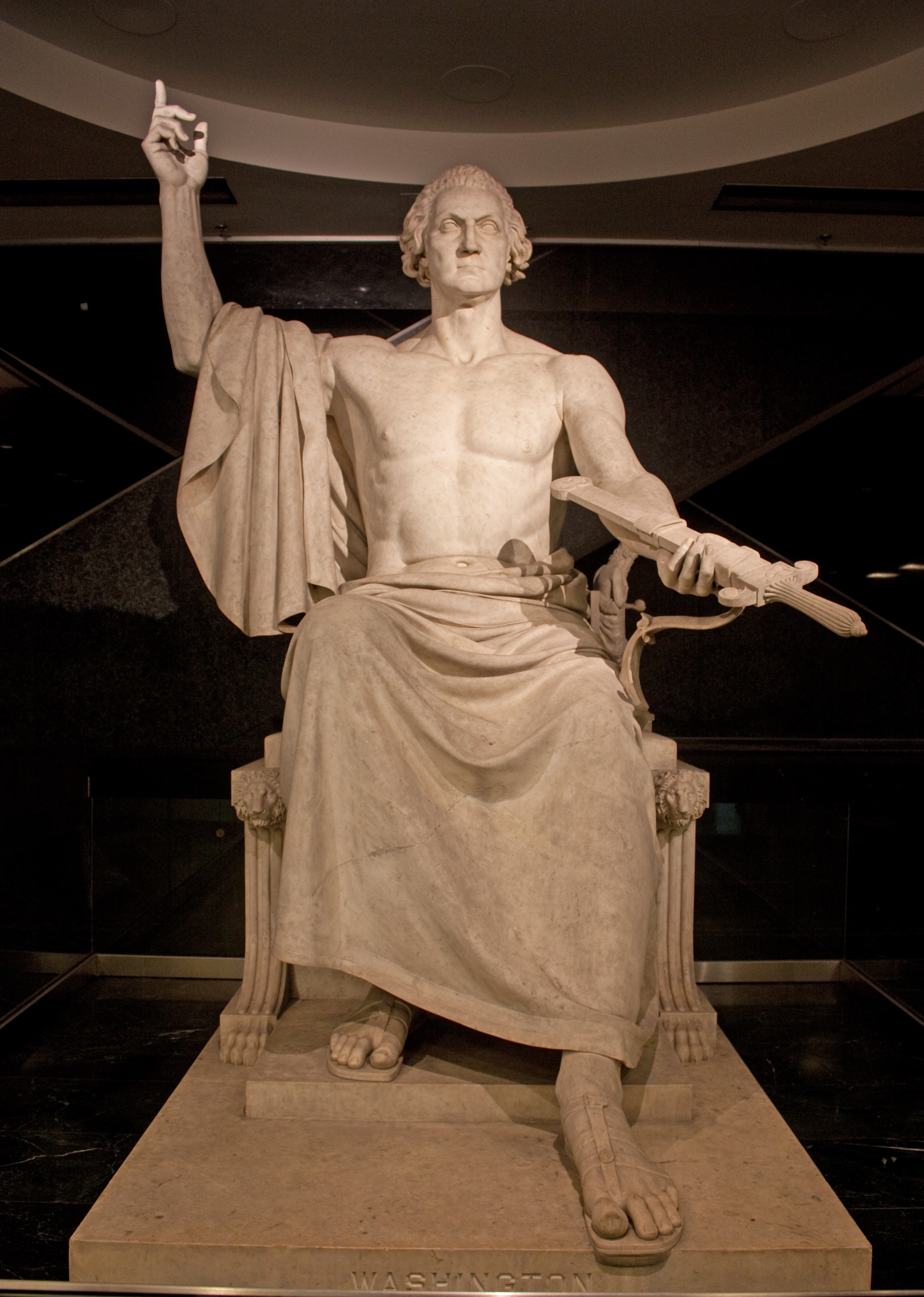
Enthroned Washington (1840), by Horatio Greenough, National Museum of American History

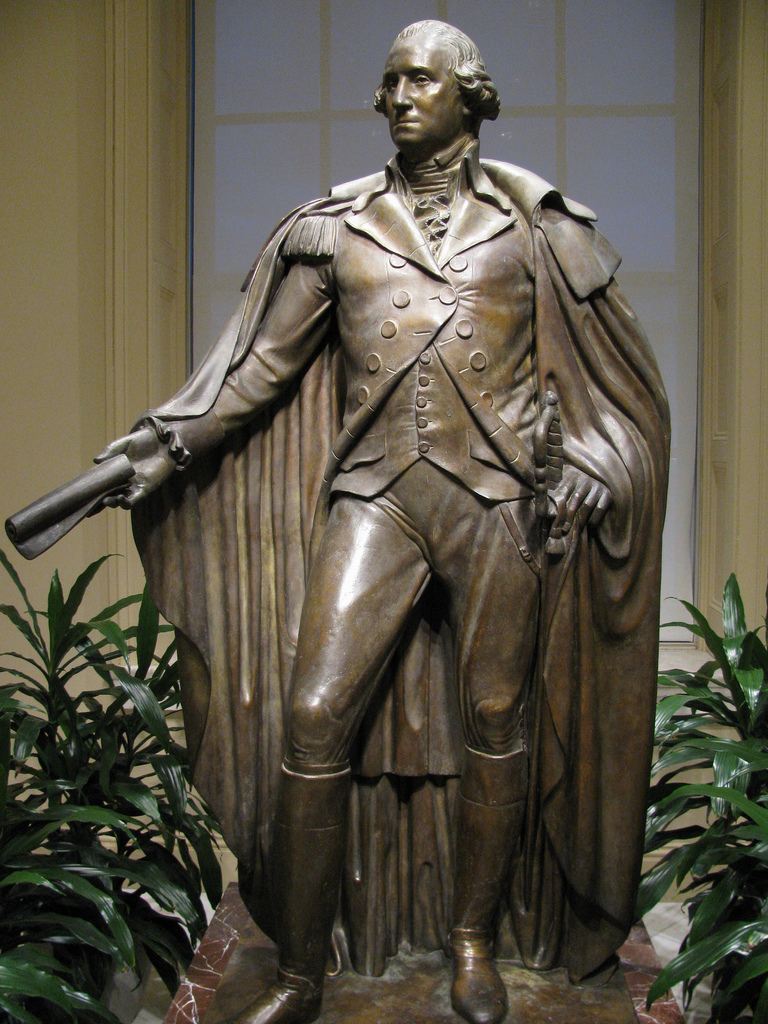
Washington Resigning His Commission (c. 1841), by Ferdinand Pettrich, Smithsonian American Art Museum

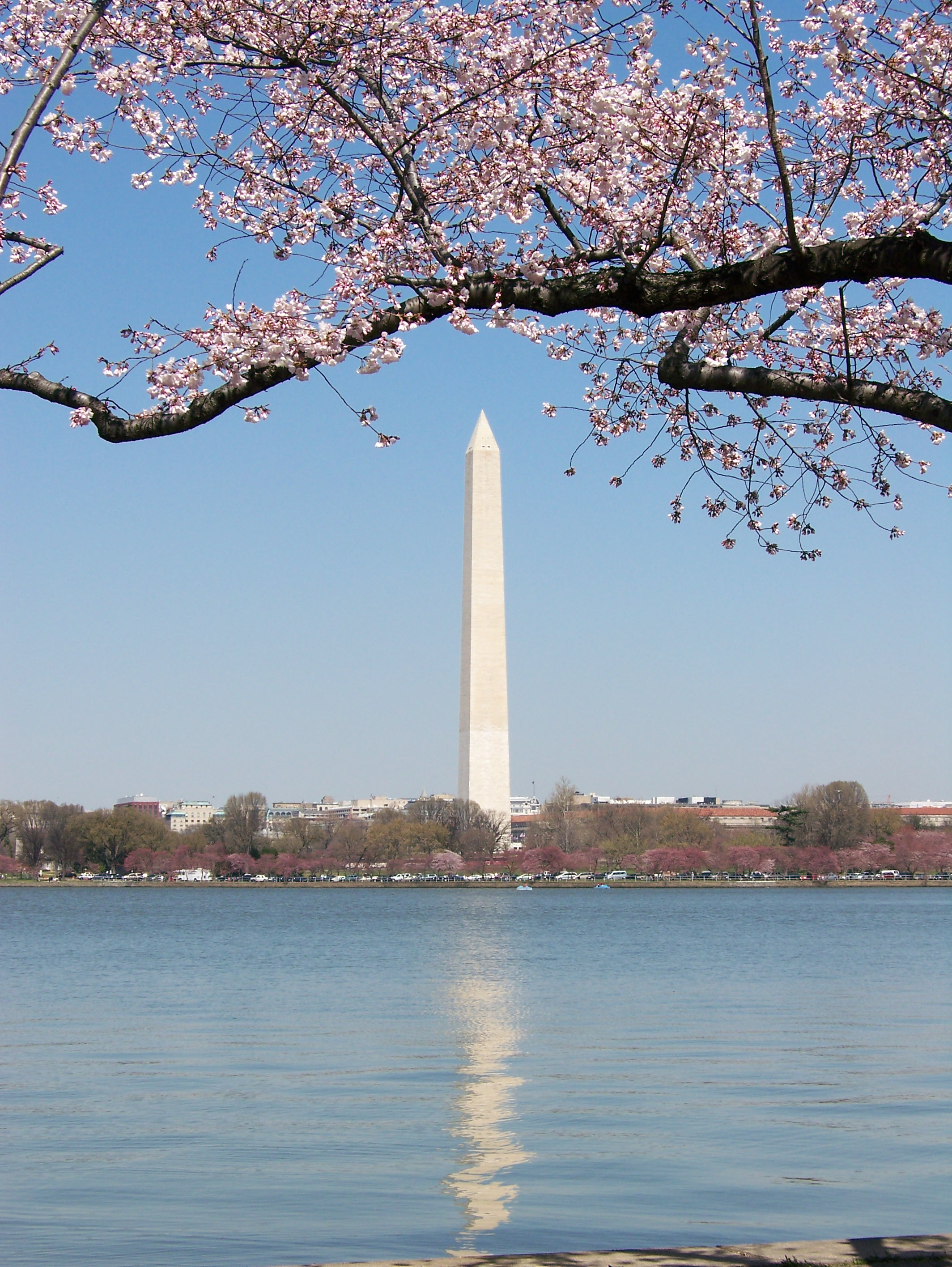
Washington Monument, Robert Mills, architect, National Mall

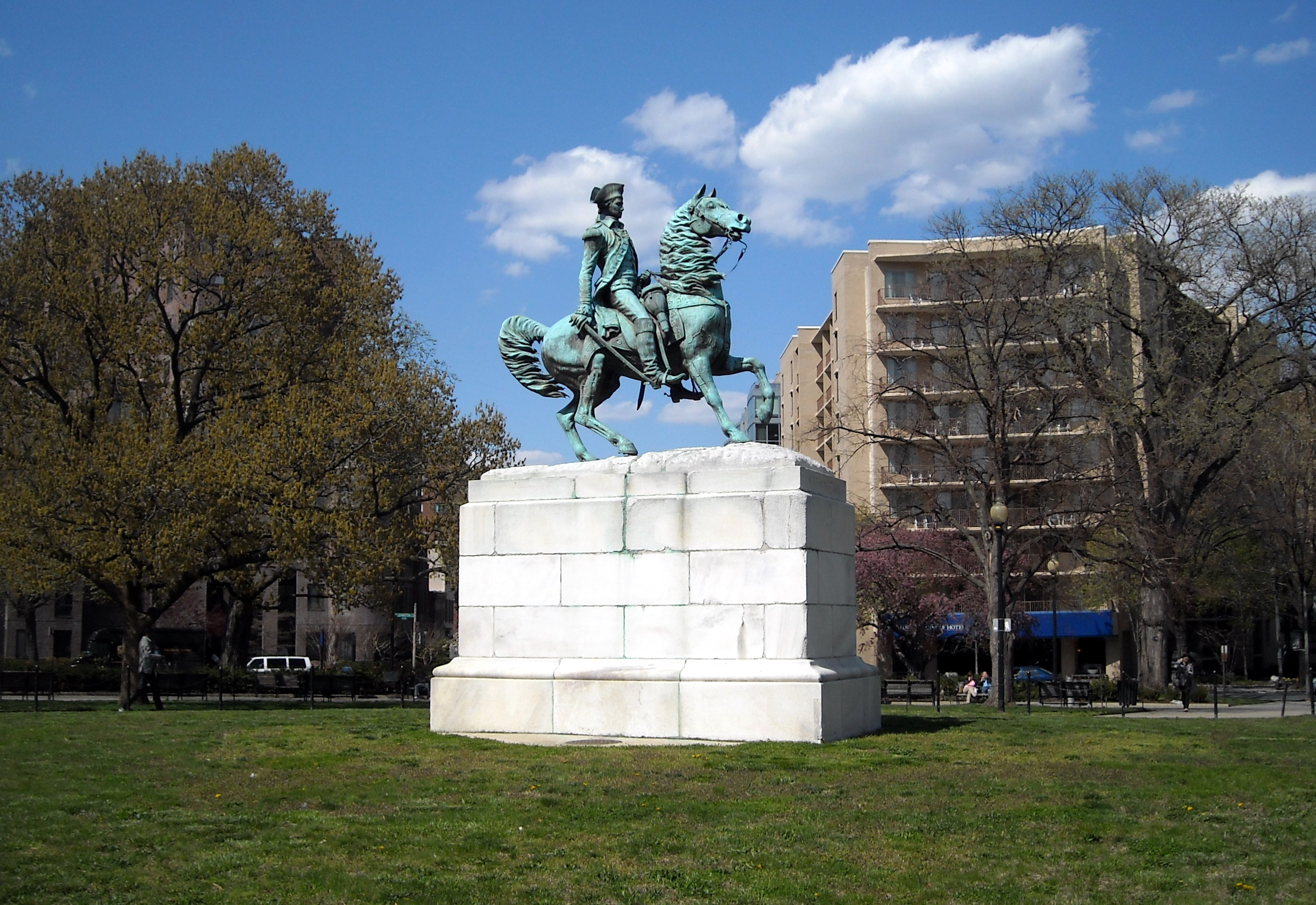
Equestrian statue of George Washington (1860), by Clark Mills, Washington Circle

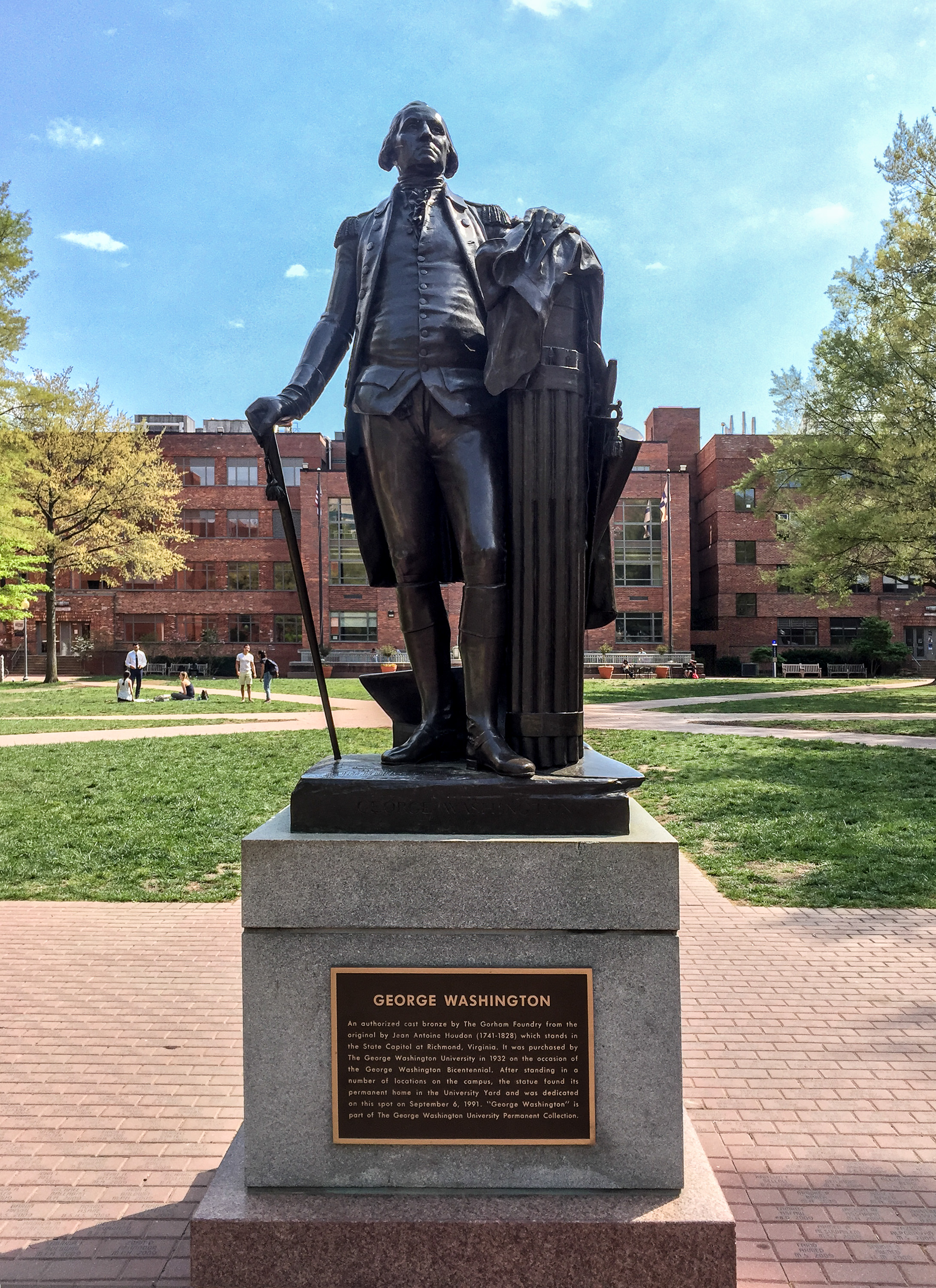
Copy (1932) after George Washington by Jean-Antoine Houdon (1791), George Washington University

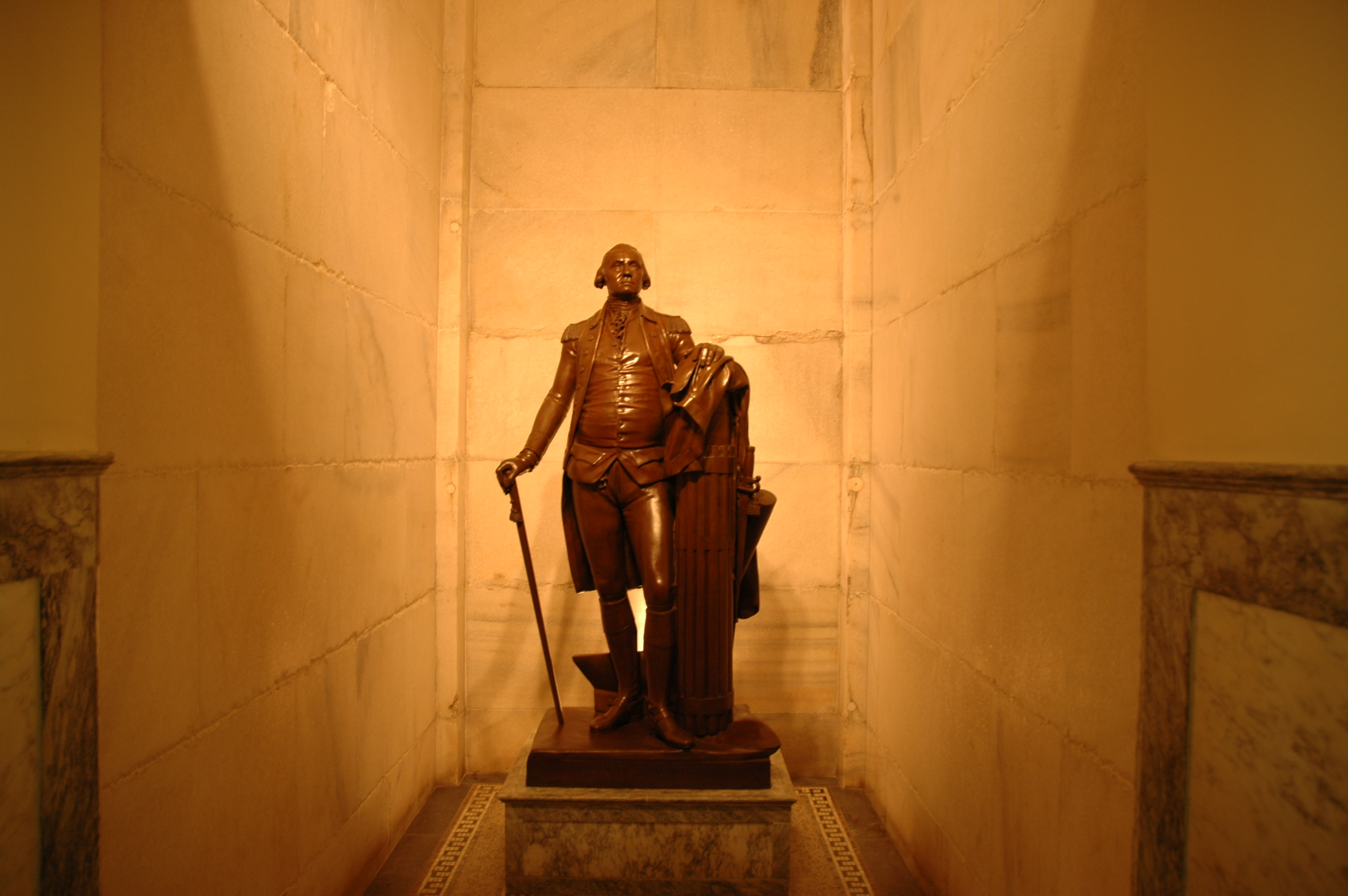
Copy after George Washington by Jean-Antoine Houdon (1791), inside the Washington Monument

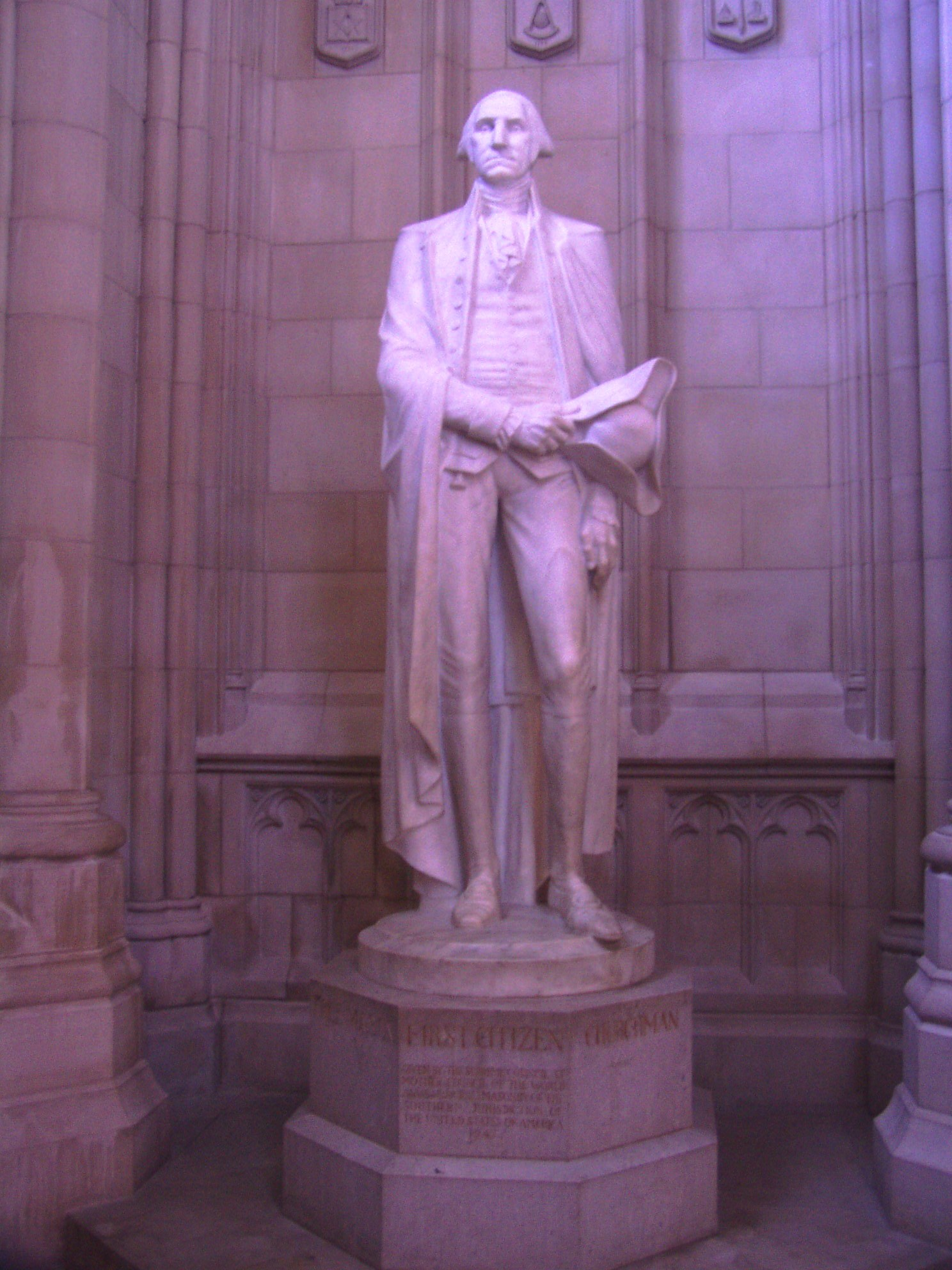
George Washington (1934–65), by Lee Lawrie, Washington National Cathedral

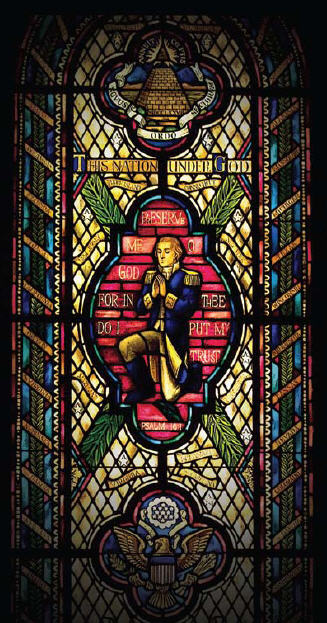
George Washington at Prayer (1954–55), United States Capitol

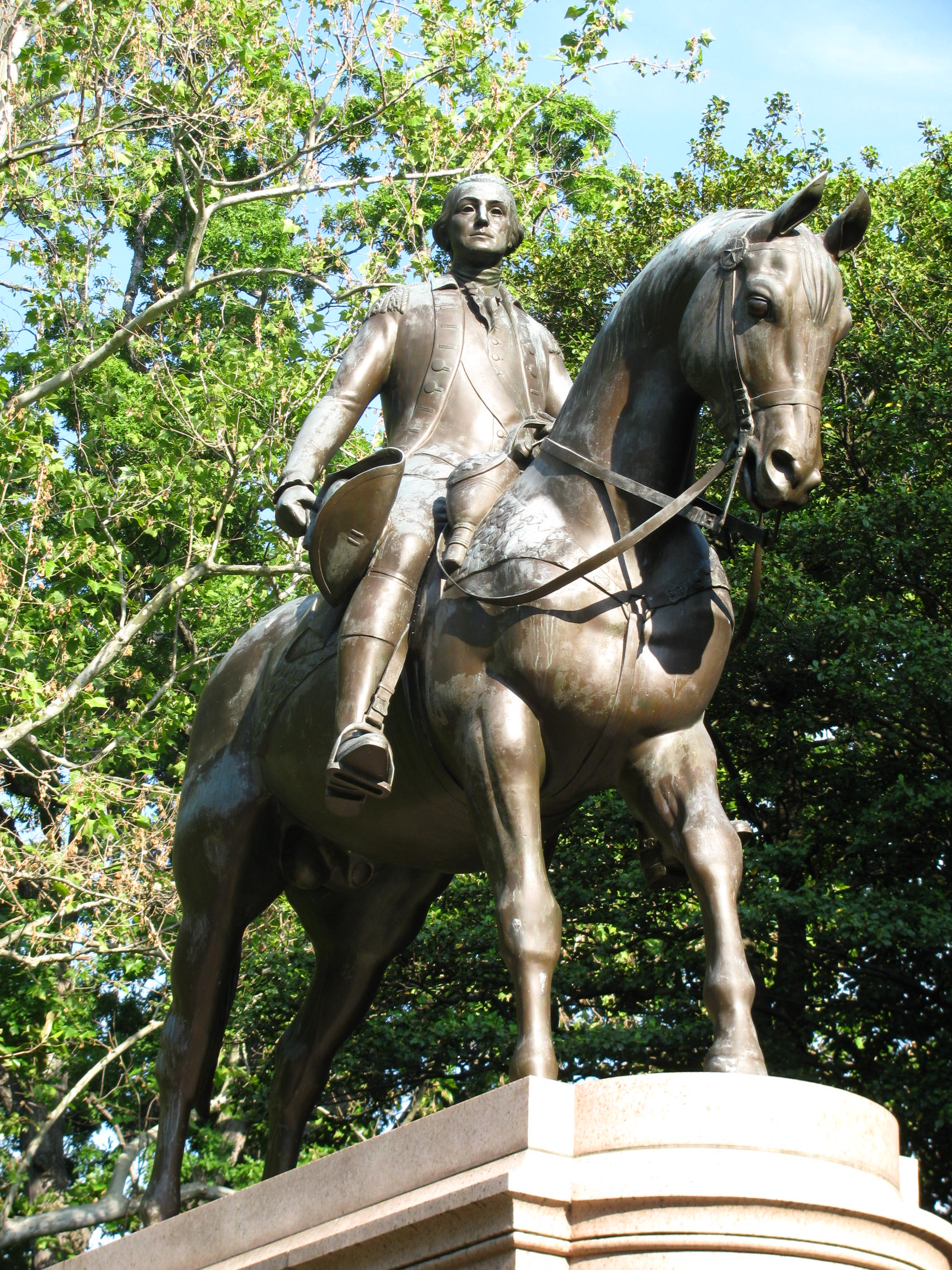
George Washington on Horseback (1959), by Herbert Haseltine, Washington National Cathedral

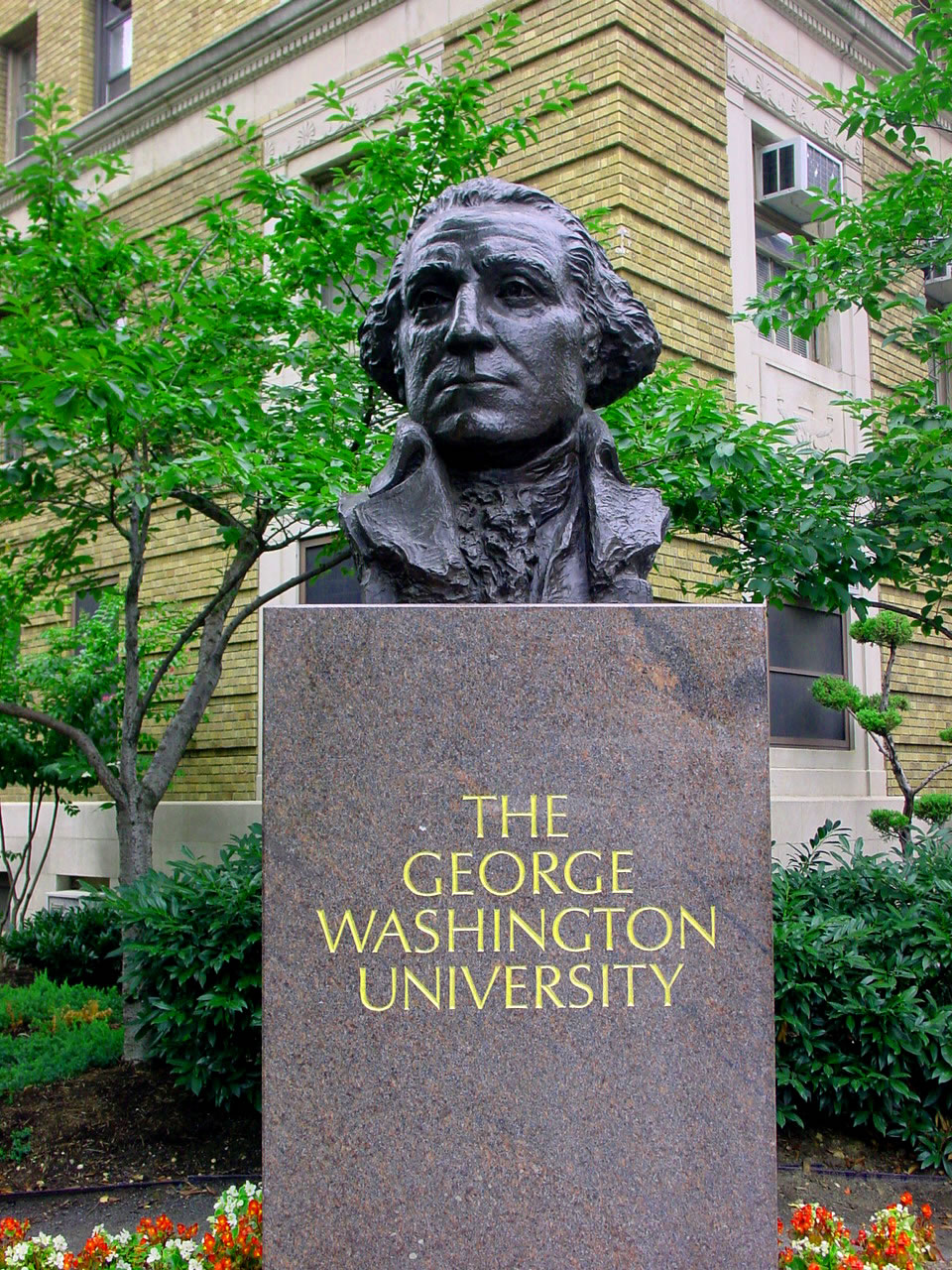
Bust of George Washington (1975), by Avard Fairbanks, George Washington University

==== California ====
- Washington Tree, Sequoia National Park. Second-tallest tree in the world, prior to a 2003 lightning strike and 2005 collapse.
- Washington Square Park, San Francisco (1847)
- George Washington (1870s), by Thomas Ball, Washington Monument, Forest Lawn Memorial Park, Glendale, Los Angeles
- Copy (1933) after George Washington by Jean-Antoine Houdon (1791), Civic Center, Los Angeles
- George Washington High School, San Francisco (1936)
  - The school contains a copy of Houdon's George Washington. Its 13 "Life of Washington" murals (1936) by Victor Arnautoff are threatened with removal, as of Summer 2019.
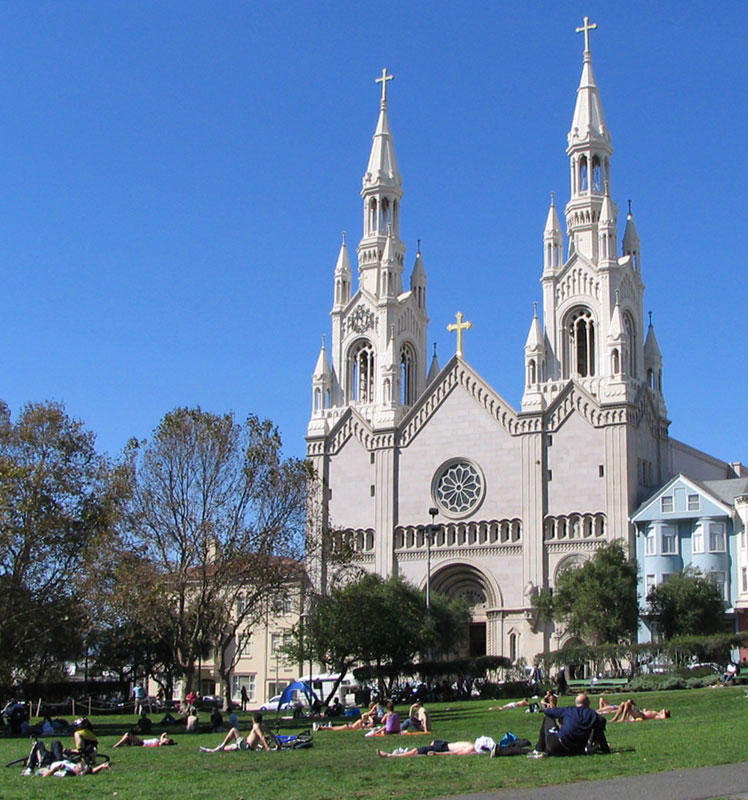
Washington Square Park, San Francisco

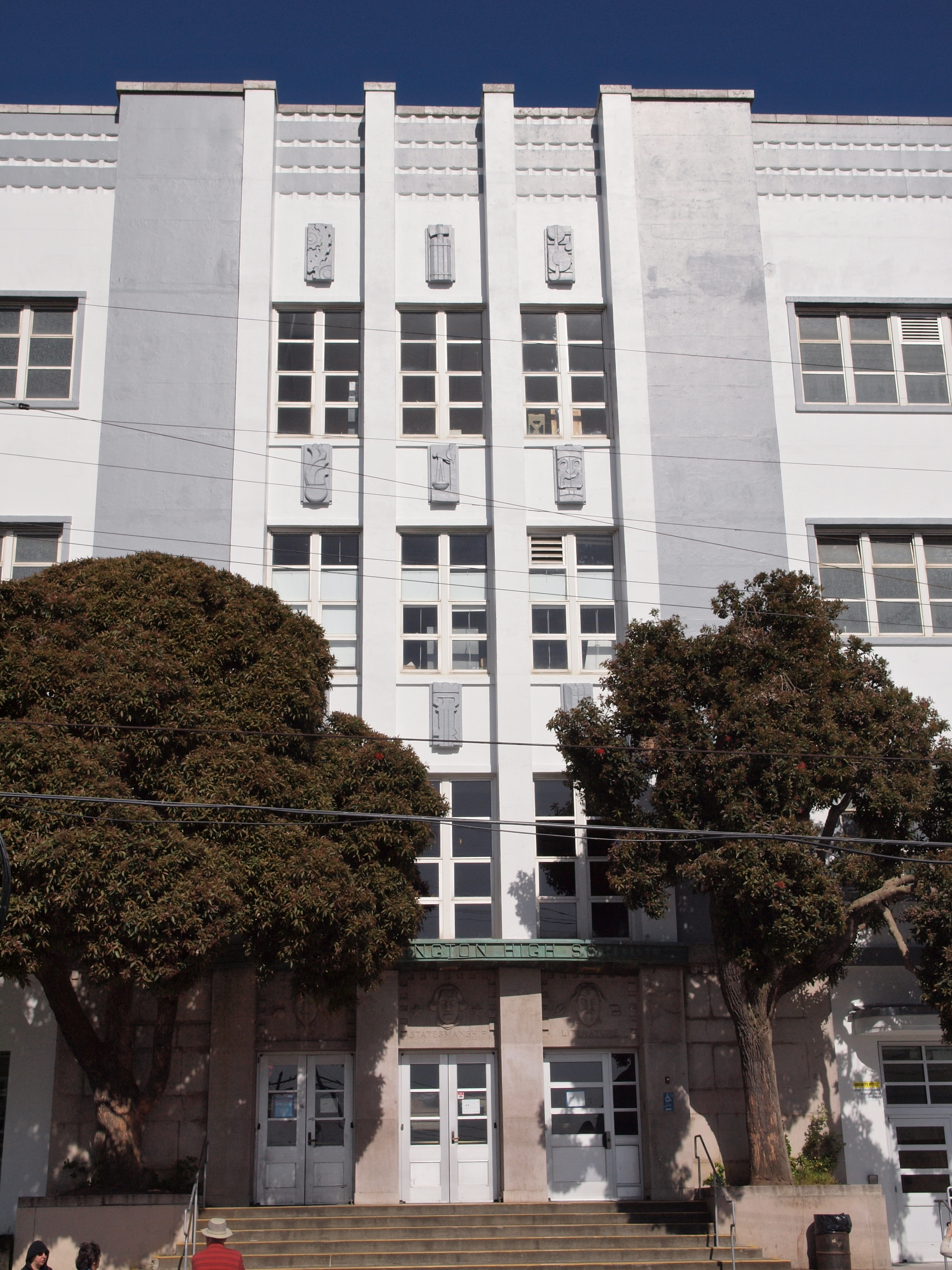
George Washington High School, San Francisco

==== Colorado ====
- Washington Park, Denver (1899)
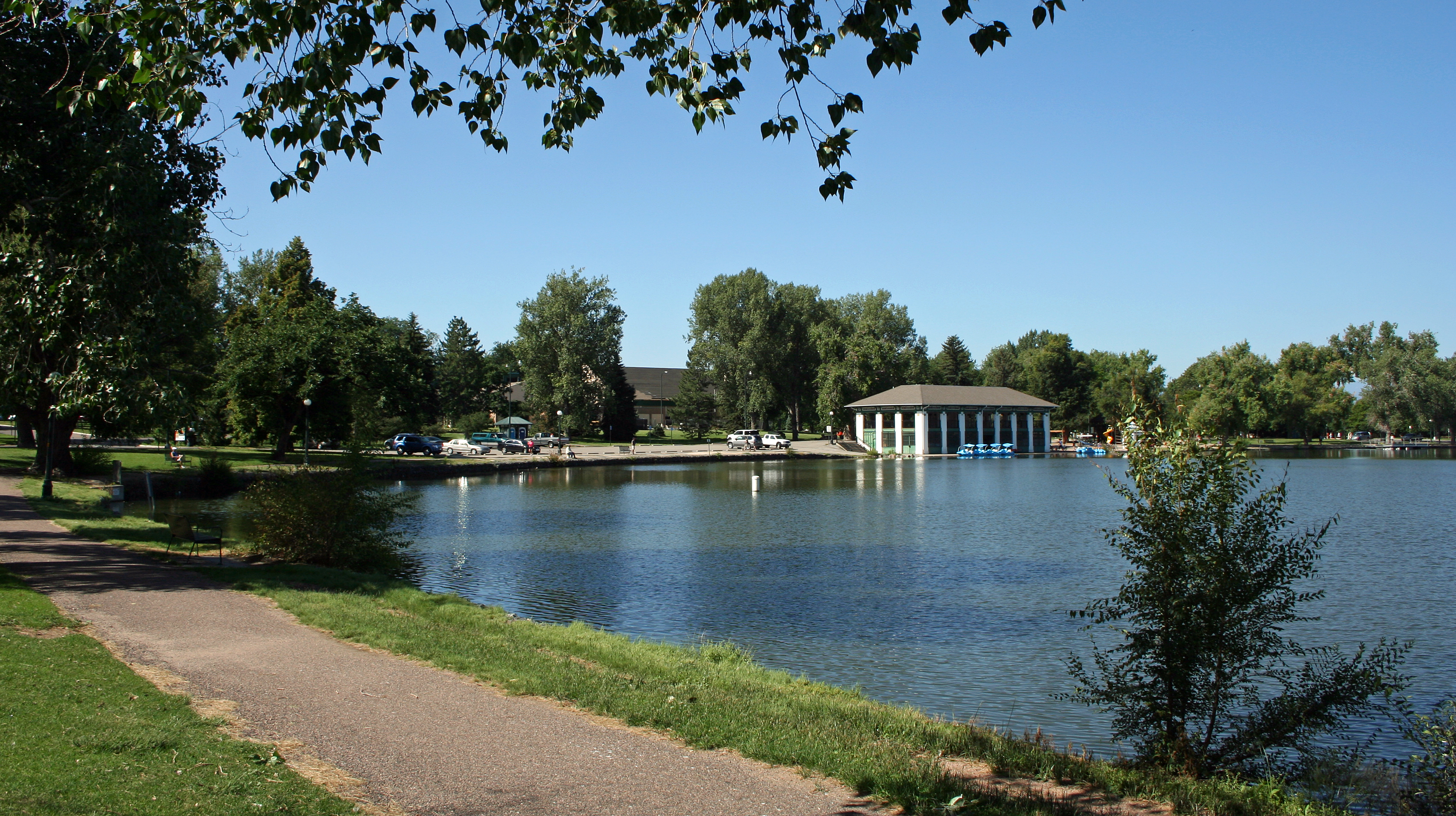
Washington Park, Denver

==== Connecticut ====
- George Washington as Master Mason (1959, this cast 1965), by Donald De Lue, Masonicare Health Center, Wallingford
- Washington College, founded in Hartford in 1823 (later changed its name to Trinity College

==== Georgia ====
- George Washington National Highway, begins in Savannah, Georgia and ends in Seattle, Washington
- George Washington – "Iron George" (circa 1841), by Alonzo Blanchard, Stone Mountain Park, Stone Mountain
- Washington Park, Atlanta (1919). The first non-segregated public park in the city.

==== Illinois ====
- Washington Square Park, Chicago (1842)
- Washington Park, Chicago (1880)
- Washington Park, Springfield (1901)
- Equestrian statue of George Washington (1900–1904), by Daniel Chester French and Edward Clark Potter, Washington Park, Chicago. A replica of French & Potter's statue in Paris, France.
- Copy (1917) of George Washington by Jean-Antoine Houdon (1791), Chicago City Hall, Chicago
- George Washington – Robert Morris – Haym Salomon Monument (1936–41), by Lorado Taft, Heald Square, Chicago
- Bust of George Washington by Avard Fairbanks, in downtown Peoria, gift of George Washington University on the occasion of the Creve Coeur Club of Peoria's 100th George Washington Banquet
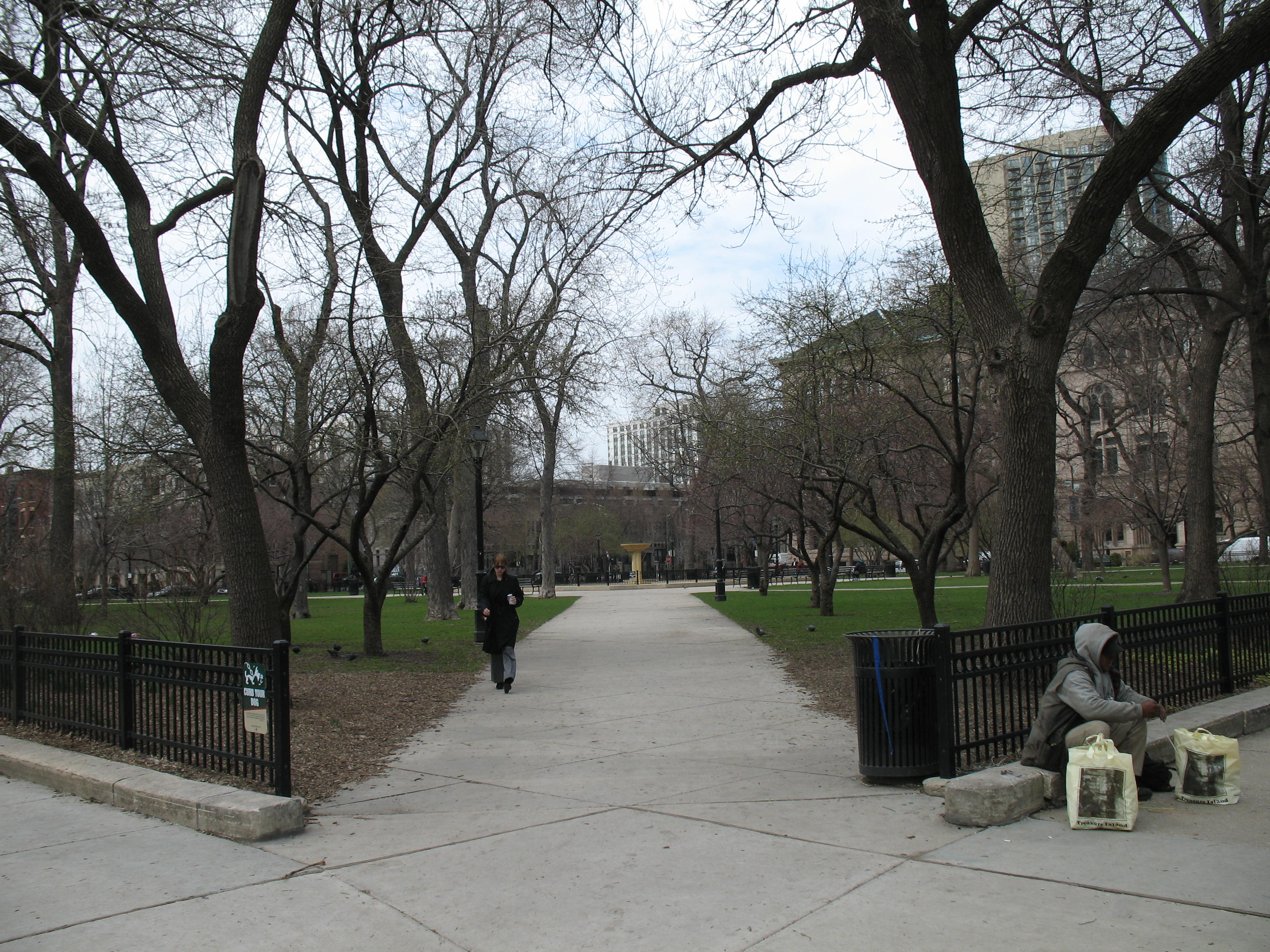
Washington Square Park, Chicago

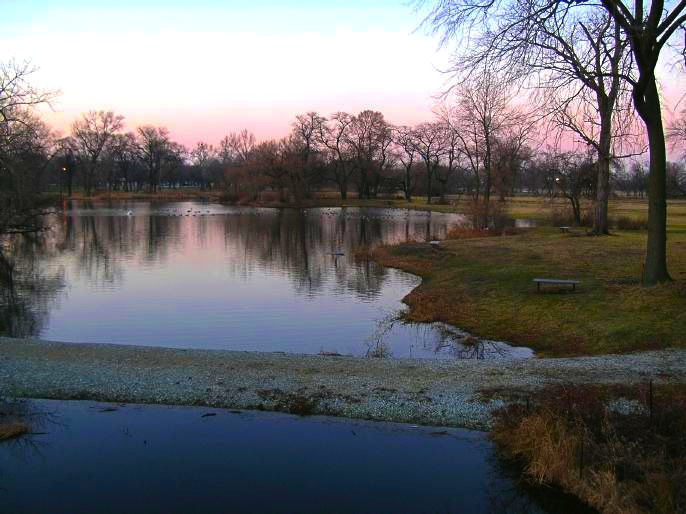
Washington Park, Chicago

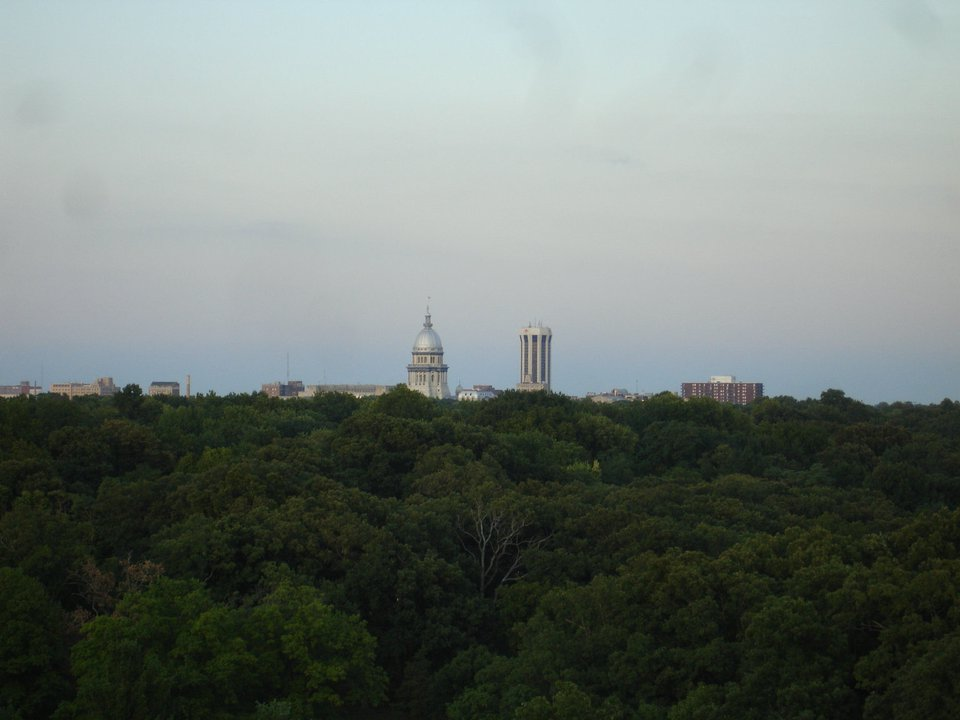
Washington Park, Springfield

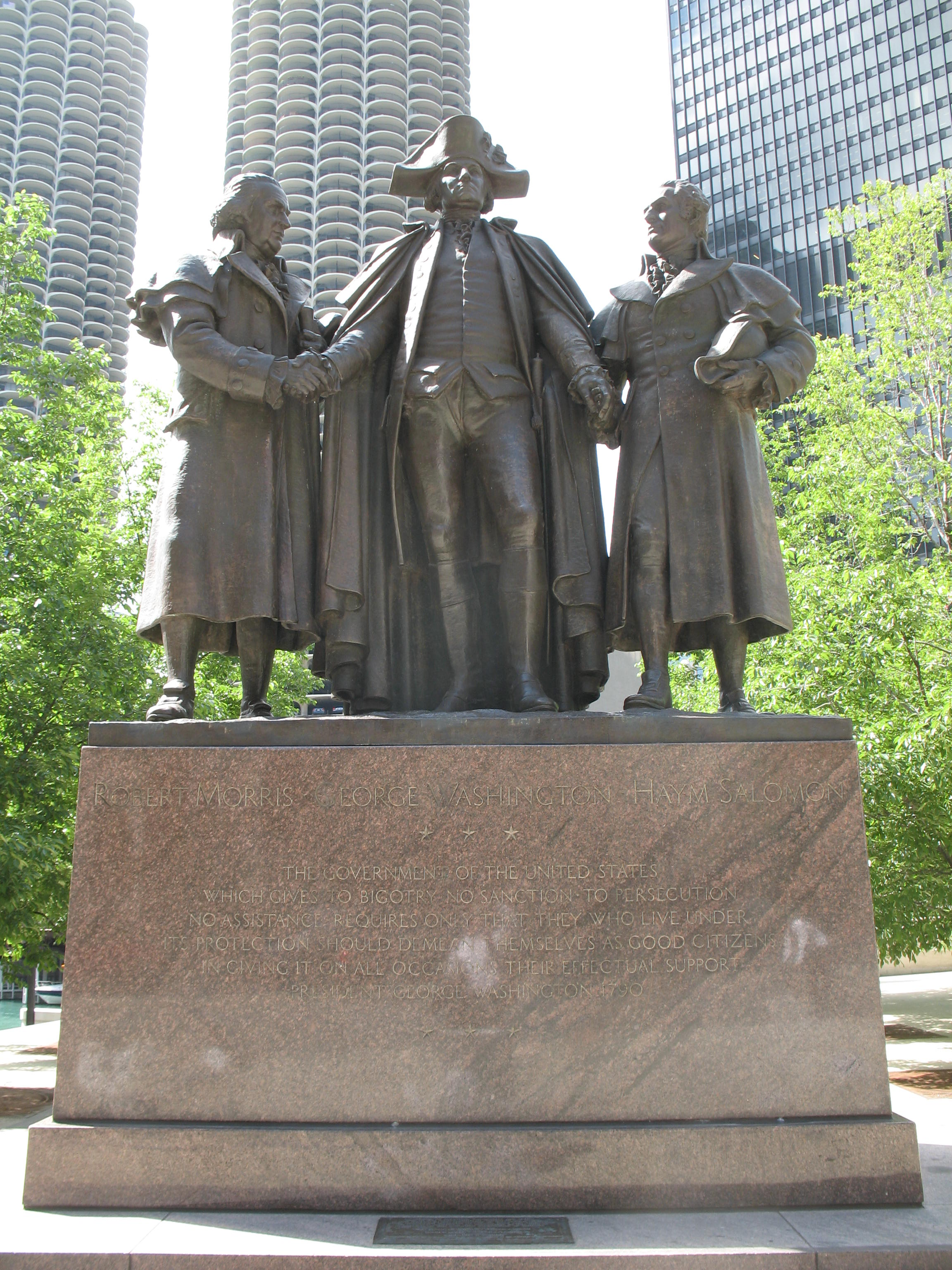
Heald Square Monument, Chicago

==== Indiana ====
- George Washington (ca. 1955), by L. Frizzi, Washington Park Cemetery, Indianapolis
- George Washington as Master Mason (1959, this cast 1986), by Donald De Lue, Indiana Statehouse, Indianapolis

==== Iowa ====
- Washington Park, Dubuque (1857)
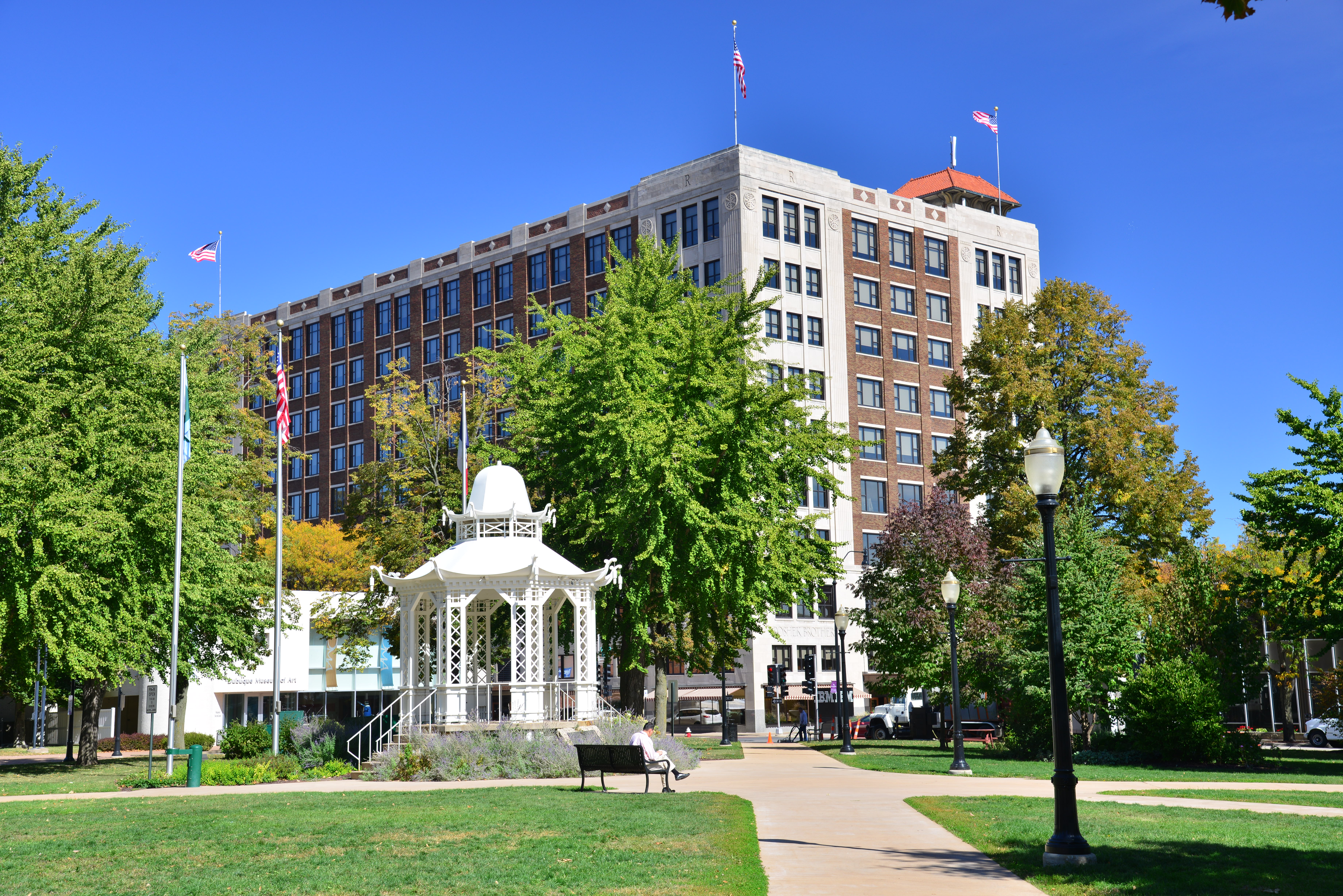
Washington Park, Dubuque

==== Louisiana ====
- Washington Oak, Audubon Park, New Orleans
- George Washington as Master Mason (1959), by Donald De Lue, Main Branch, New Orleans Public Library, New Orleans. Replicas are in Flushing, Queens, New York City (1964), Wallingford, Connecticut (1965), Alexandria, Virginia (1966), Detroit, Michigan (1966), Lexington, Massachusetts (1979), Lansing, Michigan (1982), and Indianapolis, Indiana (1987).
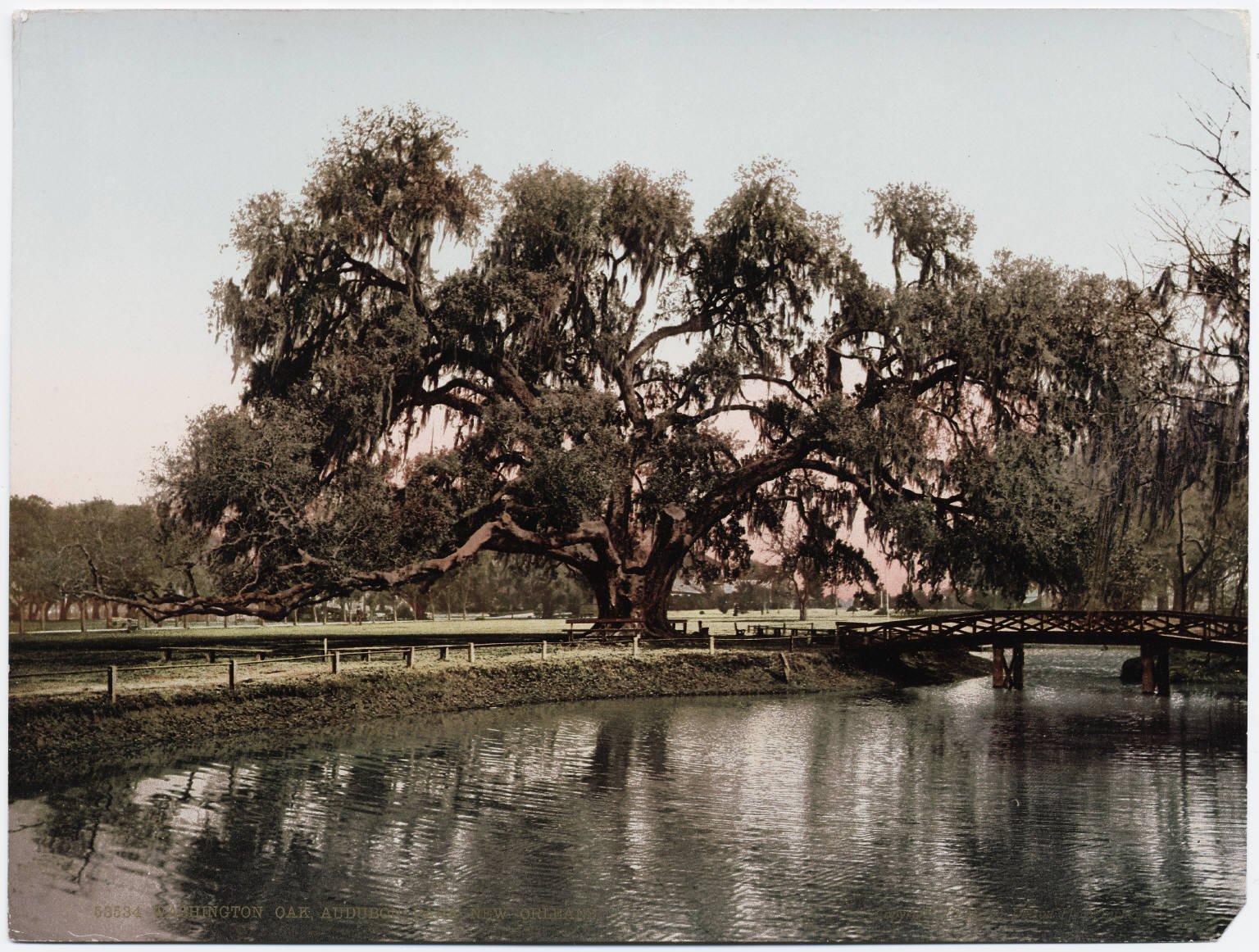
"Washington Oak" (circa 1900), Audubon Park, New Orleans

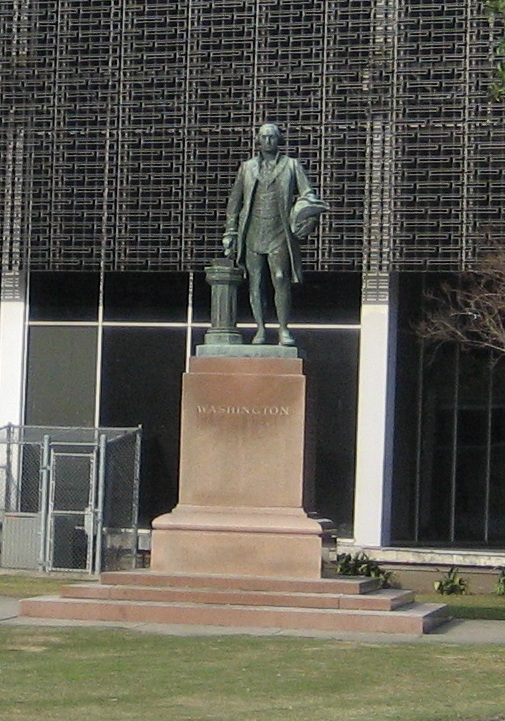
George Washington as Master Mason (1959), by Donald De Lue, New Orleans Public Library

==== Maine ====
- Washington Academy, a boarding school in East Machias, founded in 1792

==== Maryland ====
- Washington College, Chestertown. Chartered in 1782 as the College at Chester, it was renamed for Washington by 1783.
- Washington Monument (1815–29), Robert Mills, architect, Enrico Causici, sculptor, Mount Vernon Place, Baltimore
- Washington Monument (1827), Washington Monument State Park, Boonsboro. The first completed monument to Washington.
- George Washington (1857), by Edward Sheffield Bartholomew, Druid Hill Park, Baltimore
- George Washington (1947), by Lee Lawrie, Washington College, Chestertown. A bronze version of Lawrie's marble statue at the National Cathedral in Washington, DC.
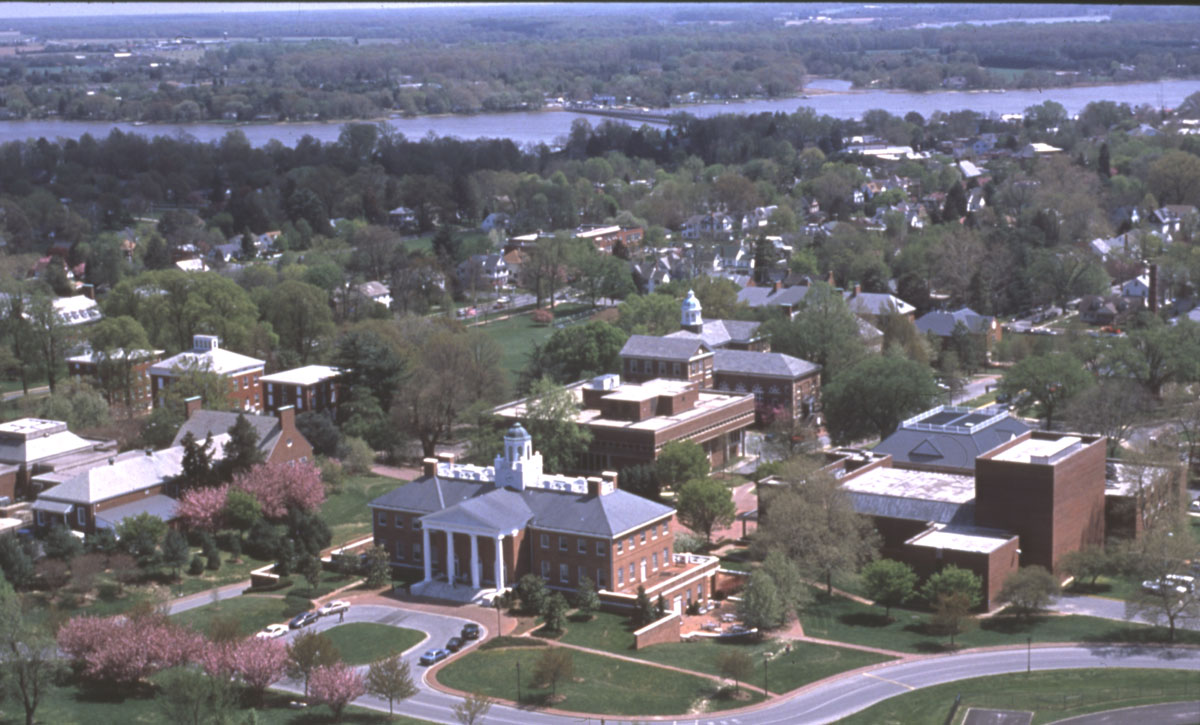
Washington College, Chestertown

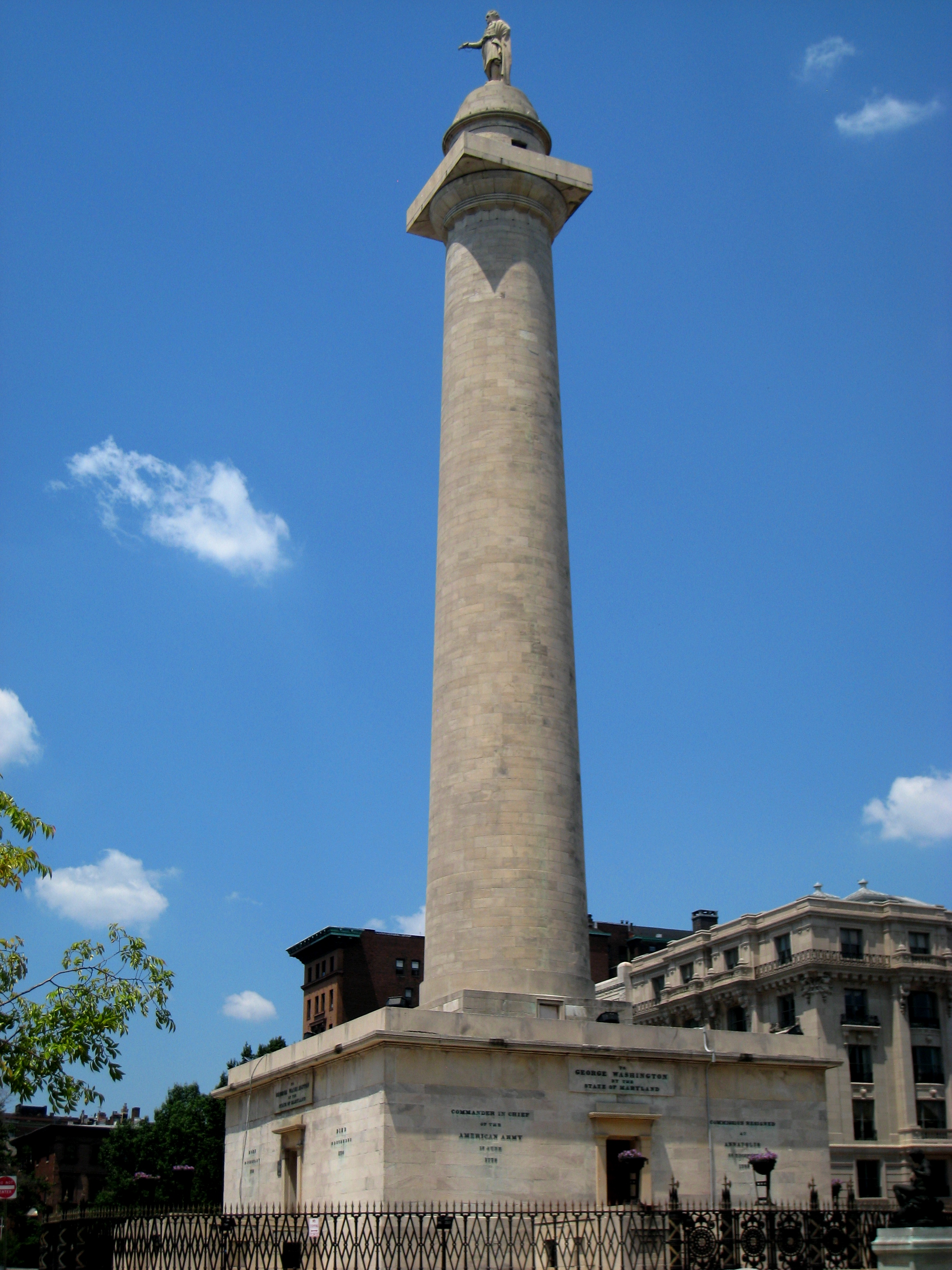
Washington Monument (Baltimore) (1815–29)

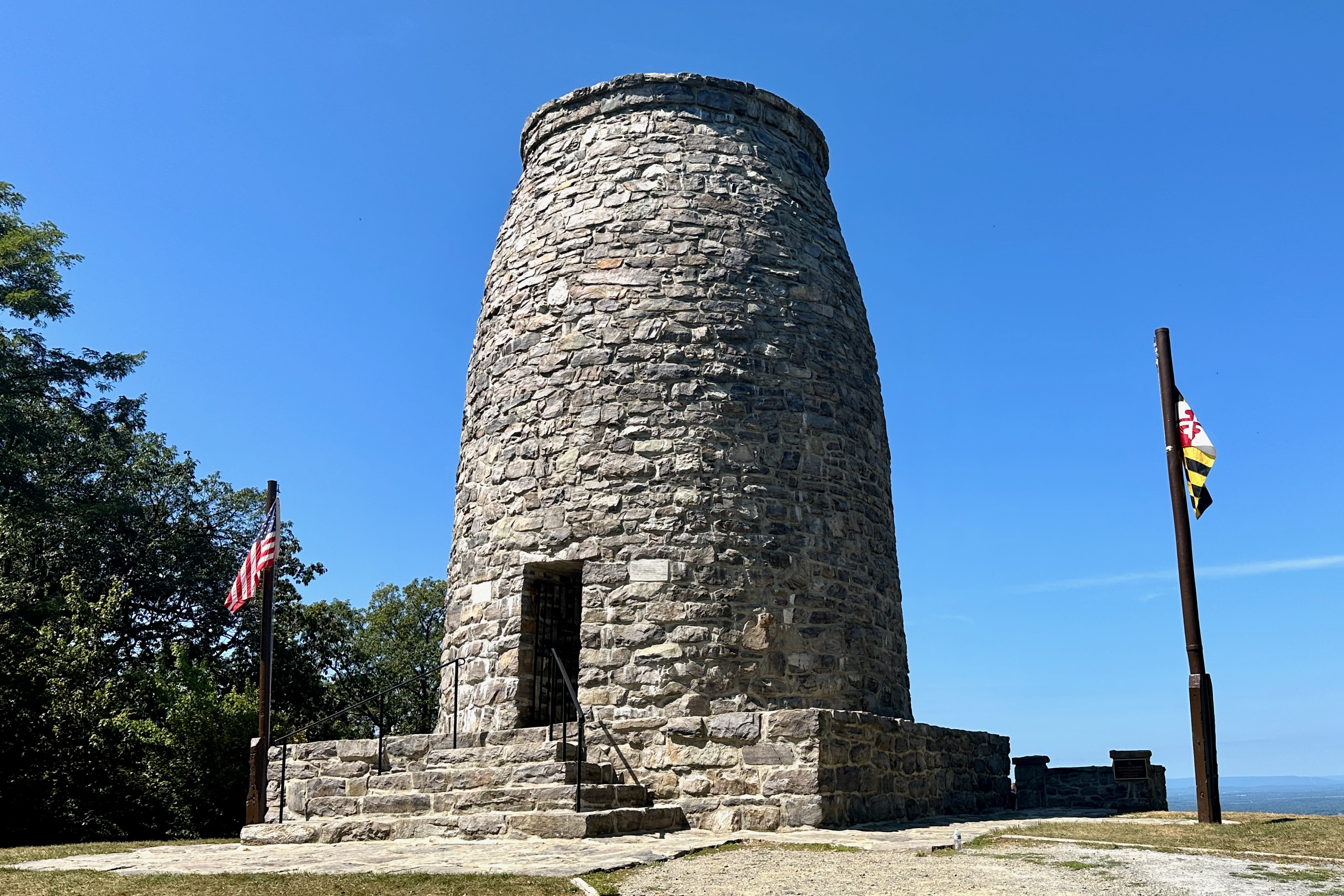
Washington Monument (1827), Washington Monument State Park

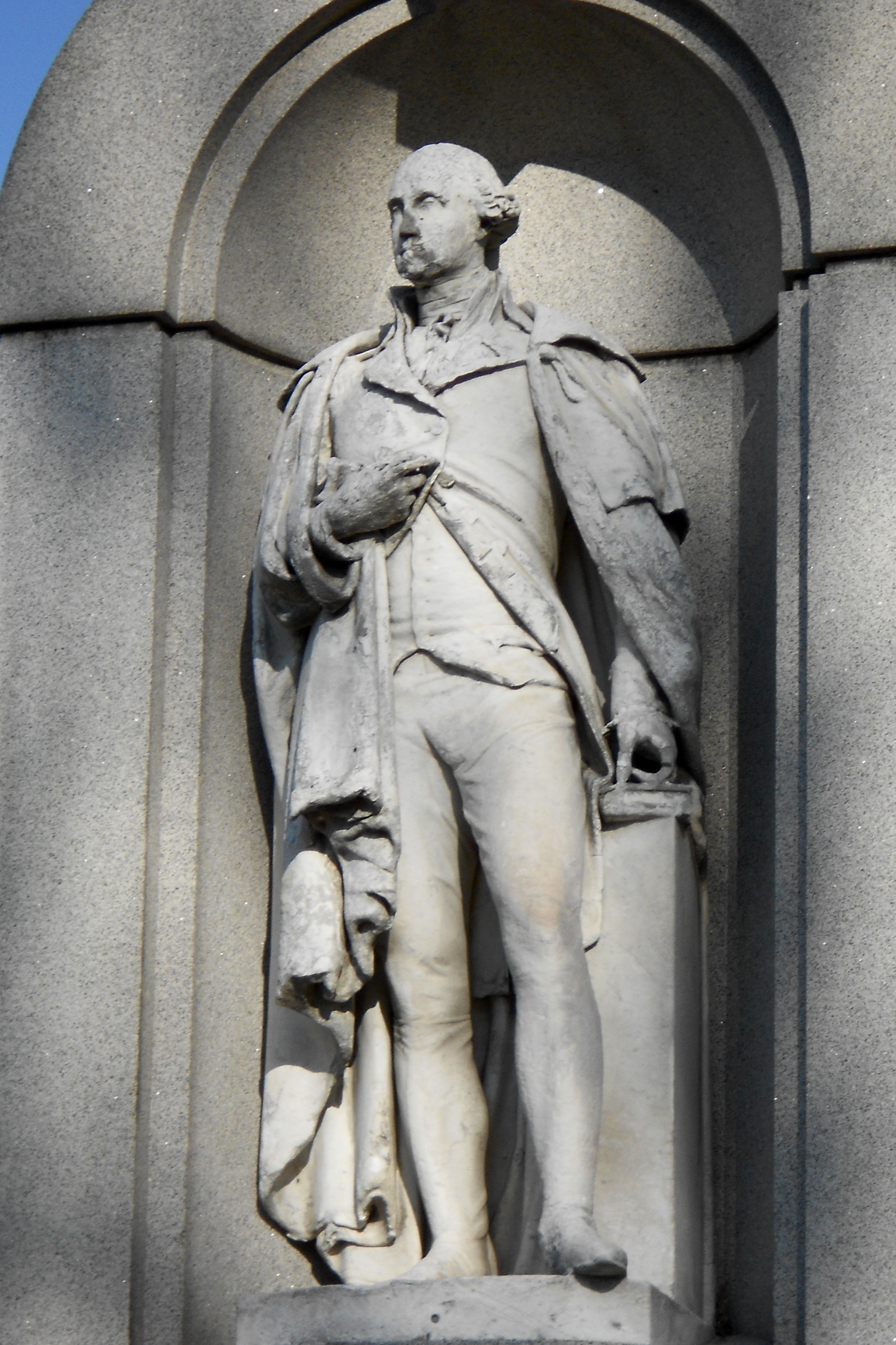
George Washington (1857), by Edward Sheffield Bartholomew, Druid Hill Park

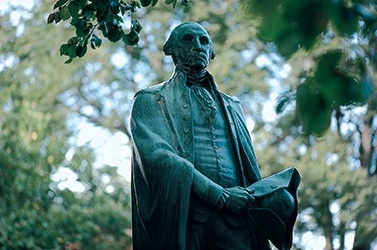
George Washington (1947), by Lee Lawrie, Washington College, Chestertown

==== Massachusetts ====
- George Washington (1826), by Sir Francis Chantrey, Massachusetts State House, Boston
- George Washington (1869), by Thomas Ball, Public Garden, Boston
- George Washington (1878), by John Quincy Adams Ward, Bartlet Mall, Newburyport
- Copy (ca. 1910) after George Washington by Jean-Antoine Houdon (1791), Forest Park, Springfield
- George Washington Memorial Highway (1932), Waltham to West Springfield
- George Washington as Master Mason (1959, this cast 1979), by Donald De Lue, National Heritage Museum, Lexington
- Copy after George Washington by Jean-Antoine Houdon (1791), National Heritage Museum, Lexington
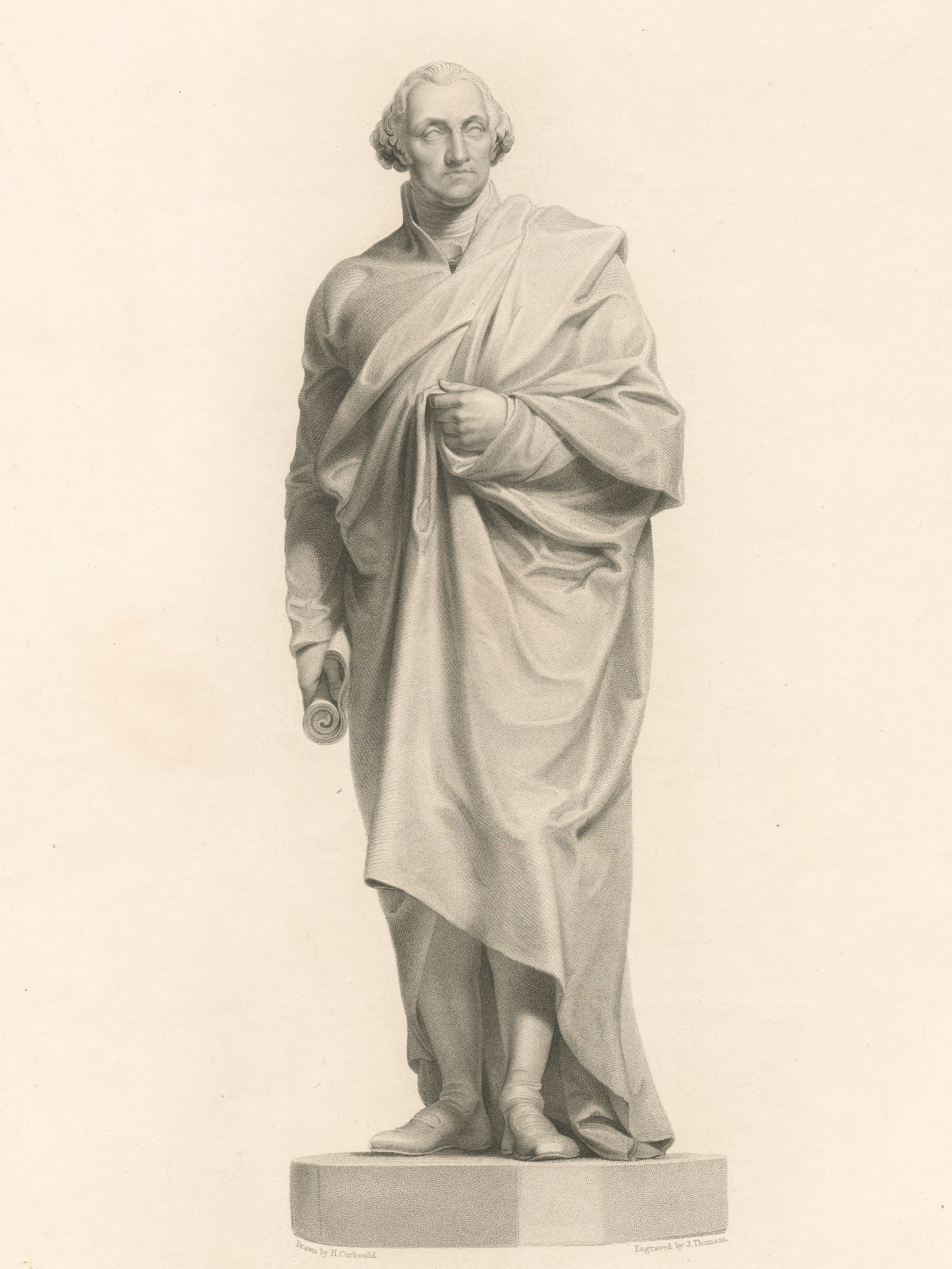
George Washington (1826), by Sir Francis Chantrey, Massachusetts State House, Boston

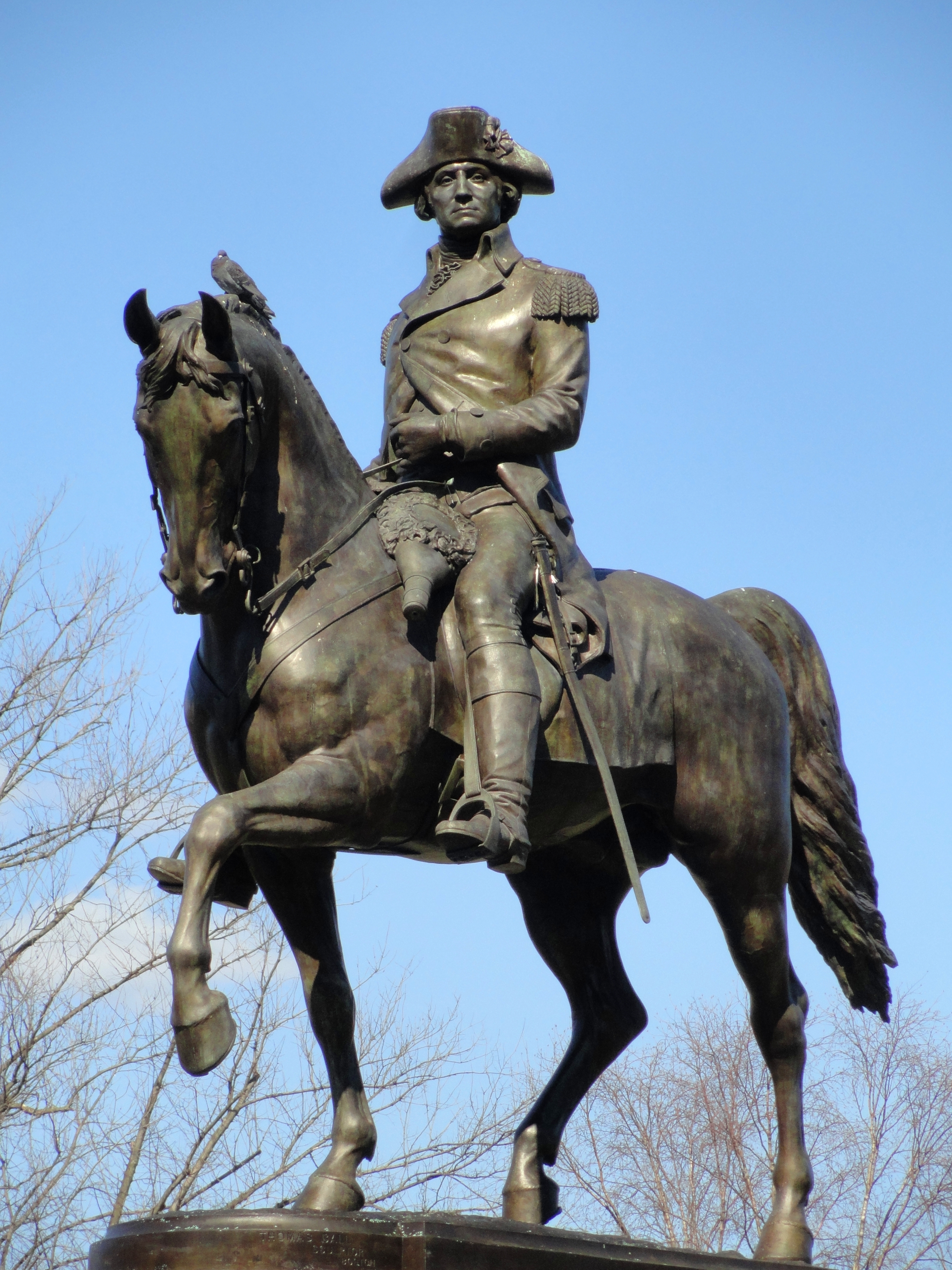
George Washington (1869), by Thomas Ball, Public Garden, Boston

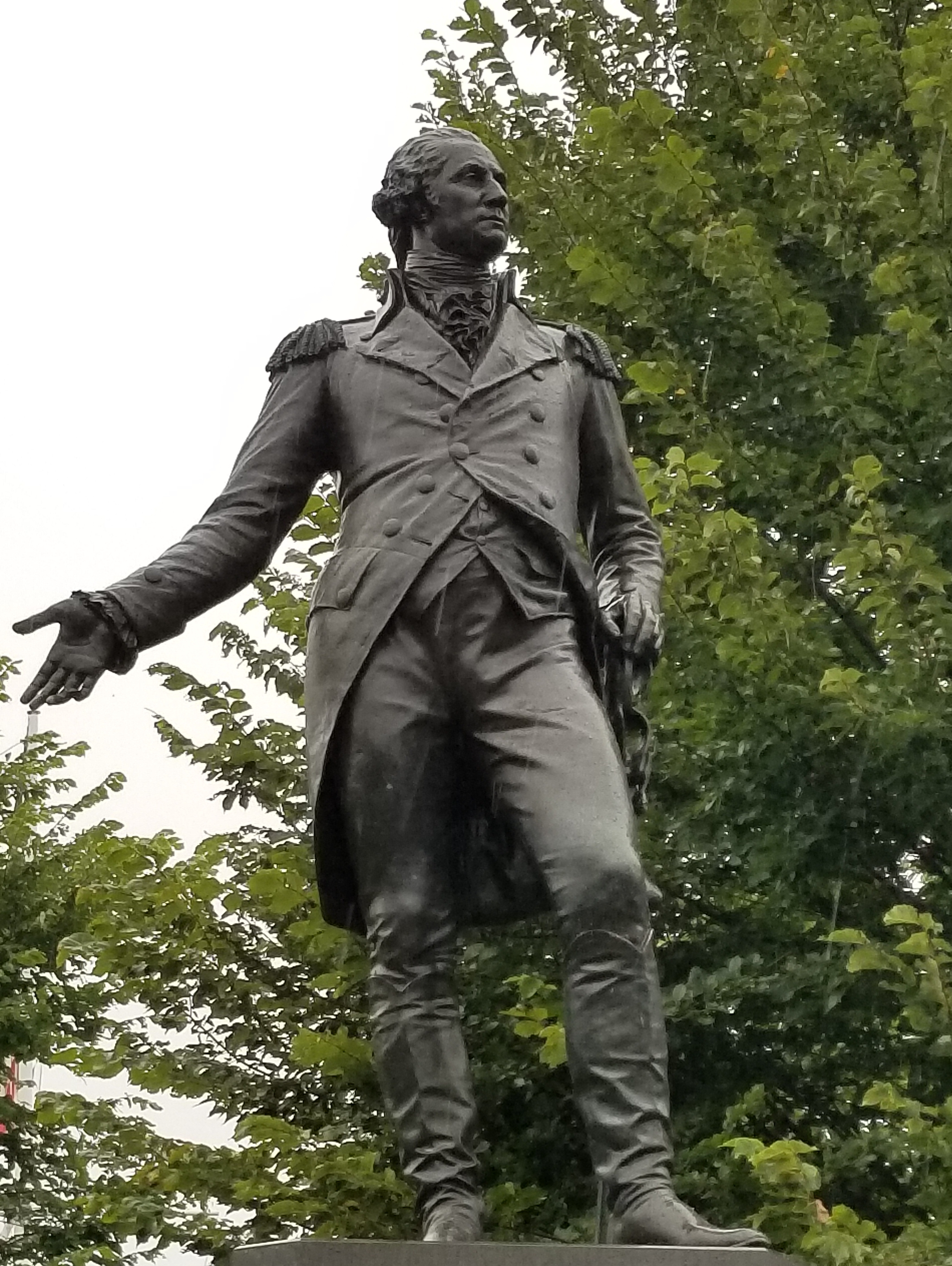
George Washington (1878), by John Quincy Adams Ward, Newburyport

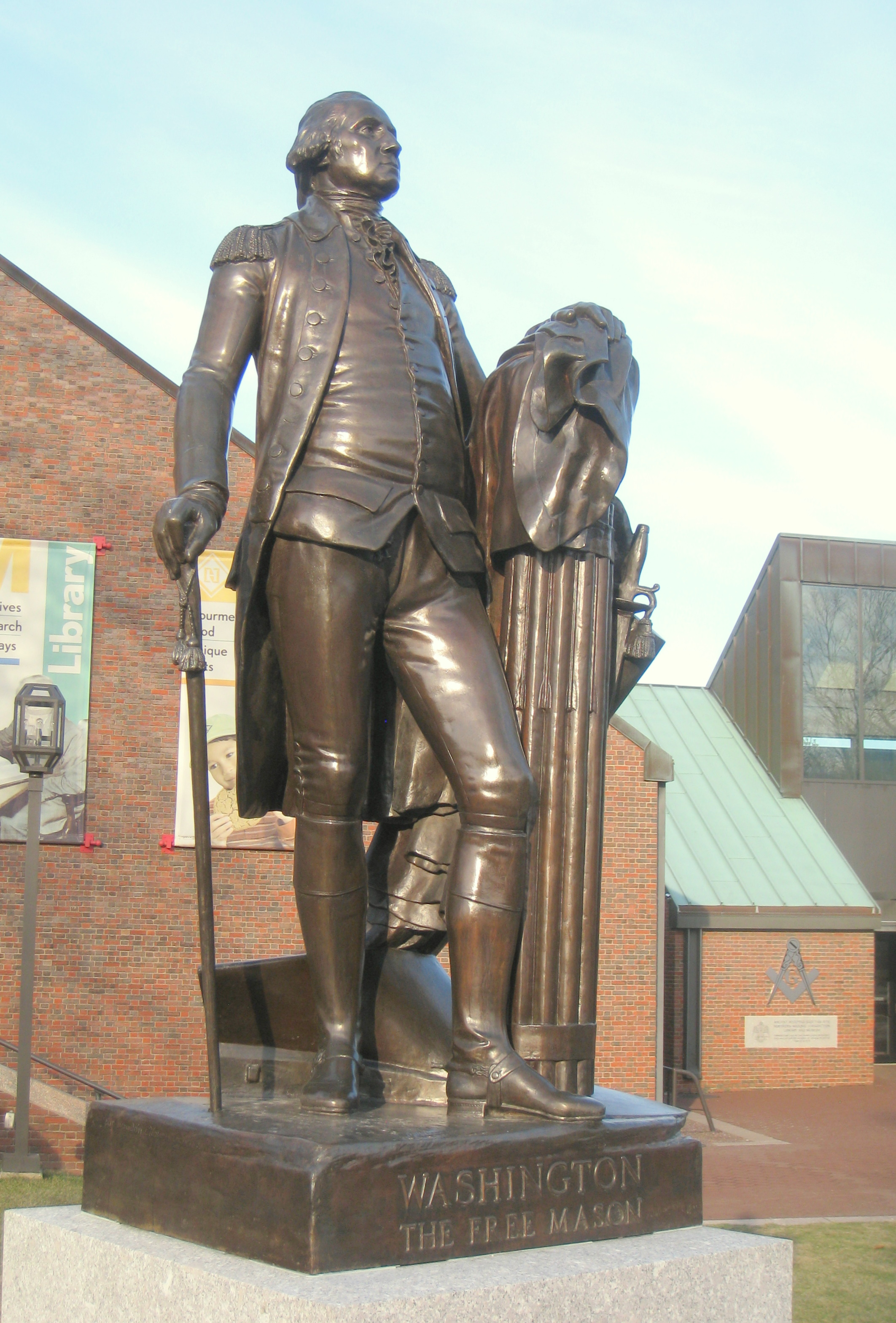
George Washington, National Heritage Museum, Lexington

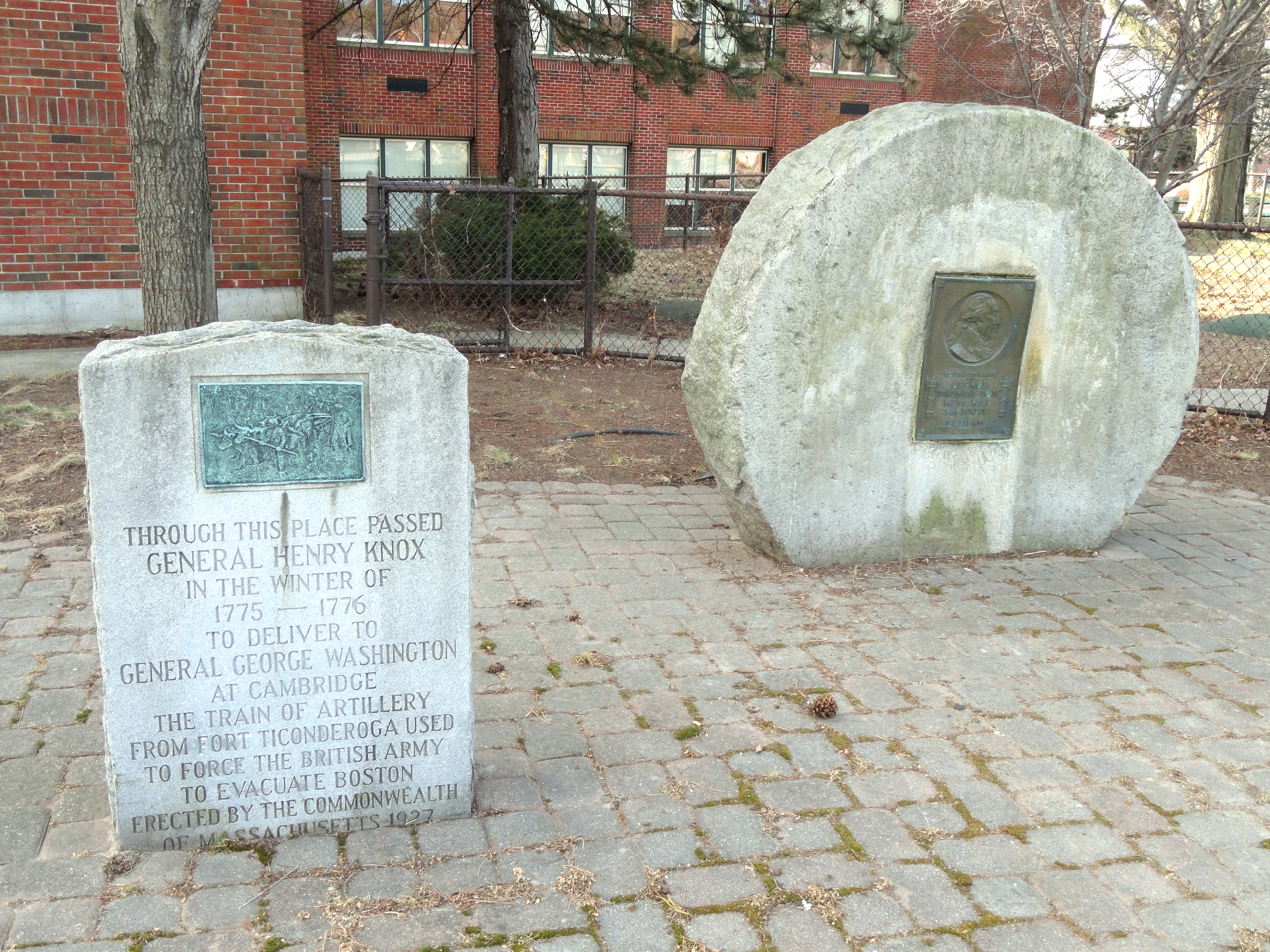
Marker for George Washington Memorial Highway (right)

==== Michigan ====
- George Washington as Master Mason (1959, this cast 1966), by Donald De Lue, Old Mariners Church, Detroit
- George Washington as Master Mason (1959, this cast 1982), by Donald De Lue, Elliott-Larsen Building, Lansing
- George Washington (2003), by Anthony Frudakis, Hillsdale College, Hillsdale
- Bust of George Washington, George Washington Masons Memorial, Michigan Memorial Garden Cemetery, Flat Rock
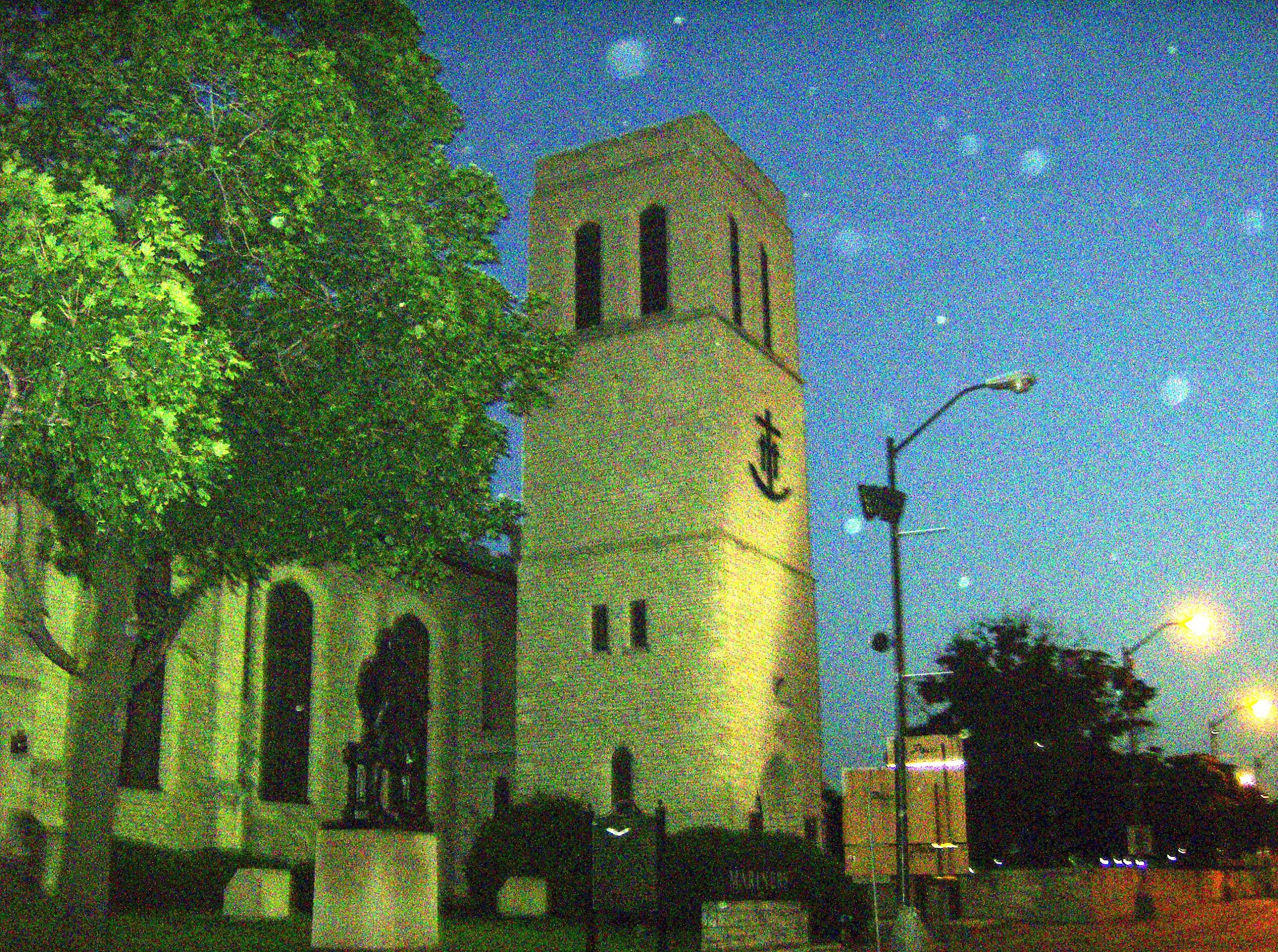
George Washington as Master Mason by Donald De Lue, Old Mariners' Church, Detroit

==== Minnesota ====
- Foshay Tower (1929), Minneapolis
- Copy (1931) after George Washington by Jean-Antoine Houdon (1791), Fair Oaks Park, Minneapolis (Toppled November 2020)
- George Washington (1937), by John K. Daniels, Mower County Courthouse, Austin

==== Missouri ====
- Washington University in St. Louis, St. Louis. Chartered as Eliot Seminary in 1853, it was renamed Washington Institute in 1854, renamed Washington University in 1856, and renamed Washington University in St. Louis in 1976
- Copy (1856) of George Washington by Jean-Antoine Houdon (1791), Lafayette Park, St. Louis
- Washington Terrace (St. Louis), a gated community founded about 1892
- George Washington Memorial (1925), Kansas City. A copy after Henry Shrady's equestrian statue in Brooklyn, New York.
- Copy (2003) of George Washington by Jean-Antoine Houdon (1791), Washington University in St. Louis
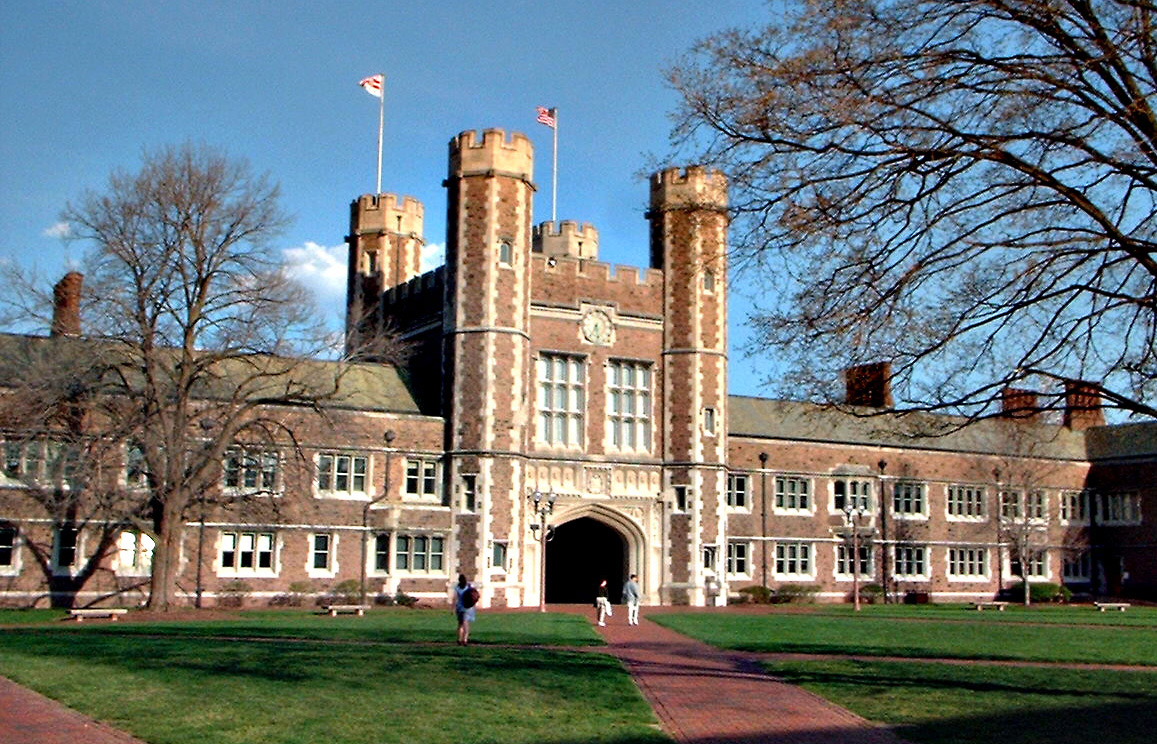
Washington University in St. Louis, St. Louis

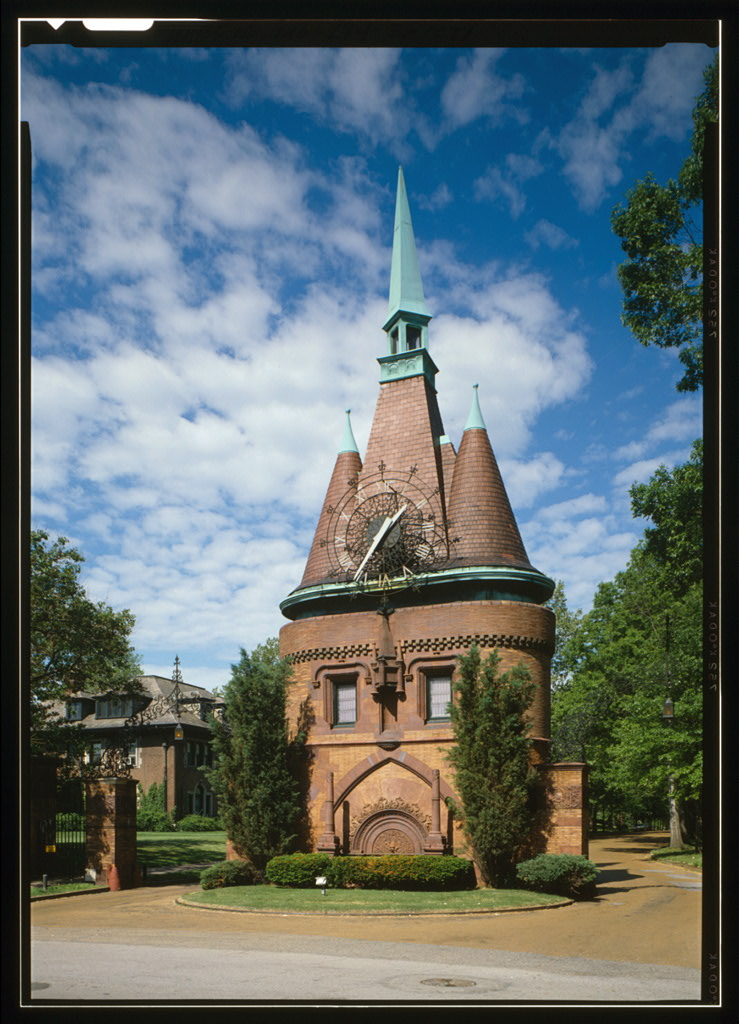
Washington Terrace (St. Louis)

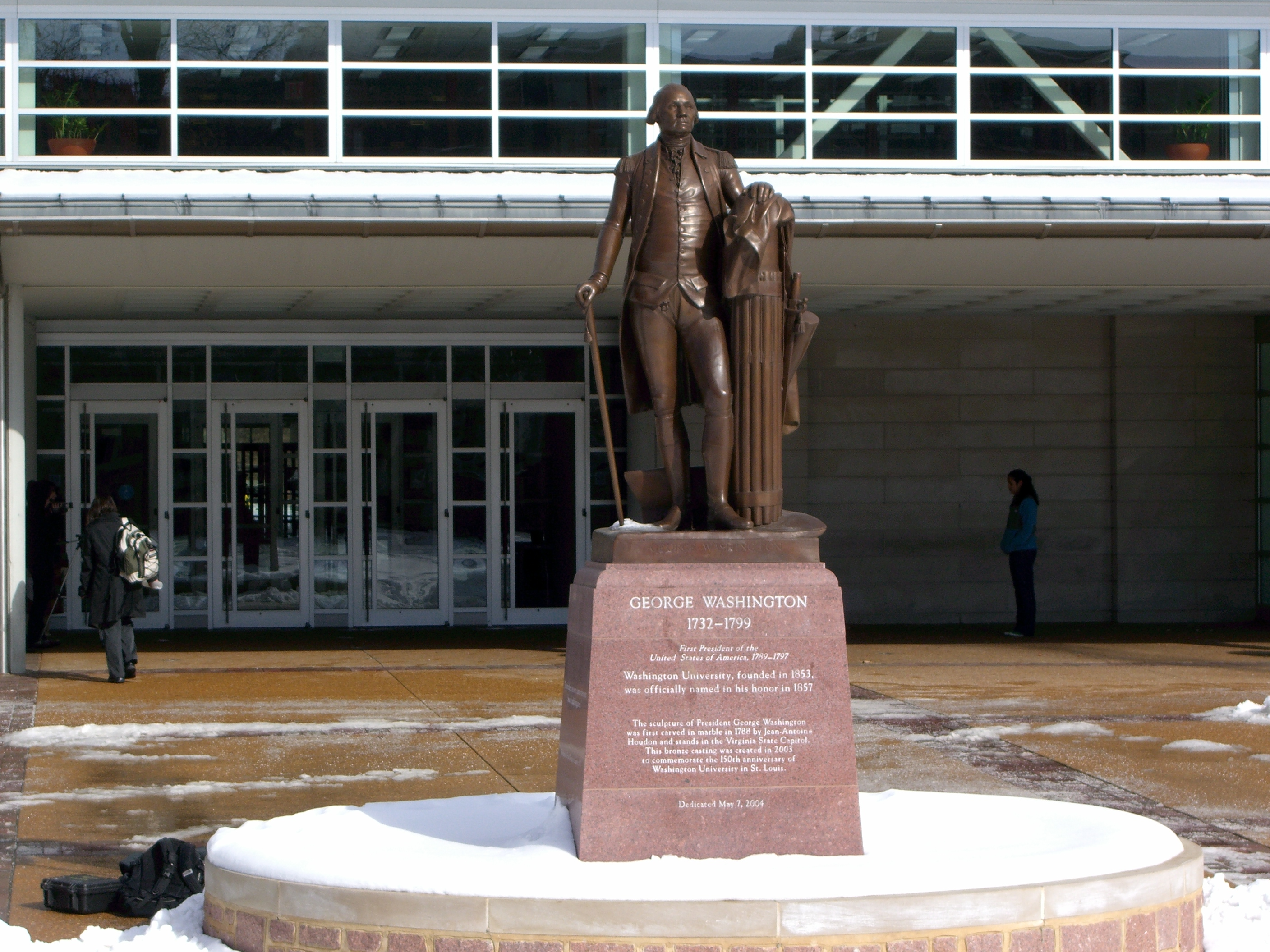
Copy (2003) of George Washington statue (1785–88) by Jean-Antoine Houdon in front of Olin Library at Washington University in St. Louis.

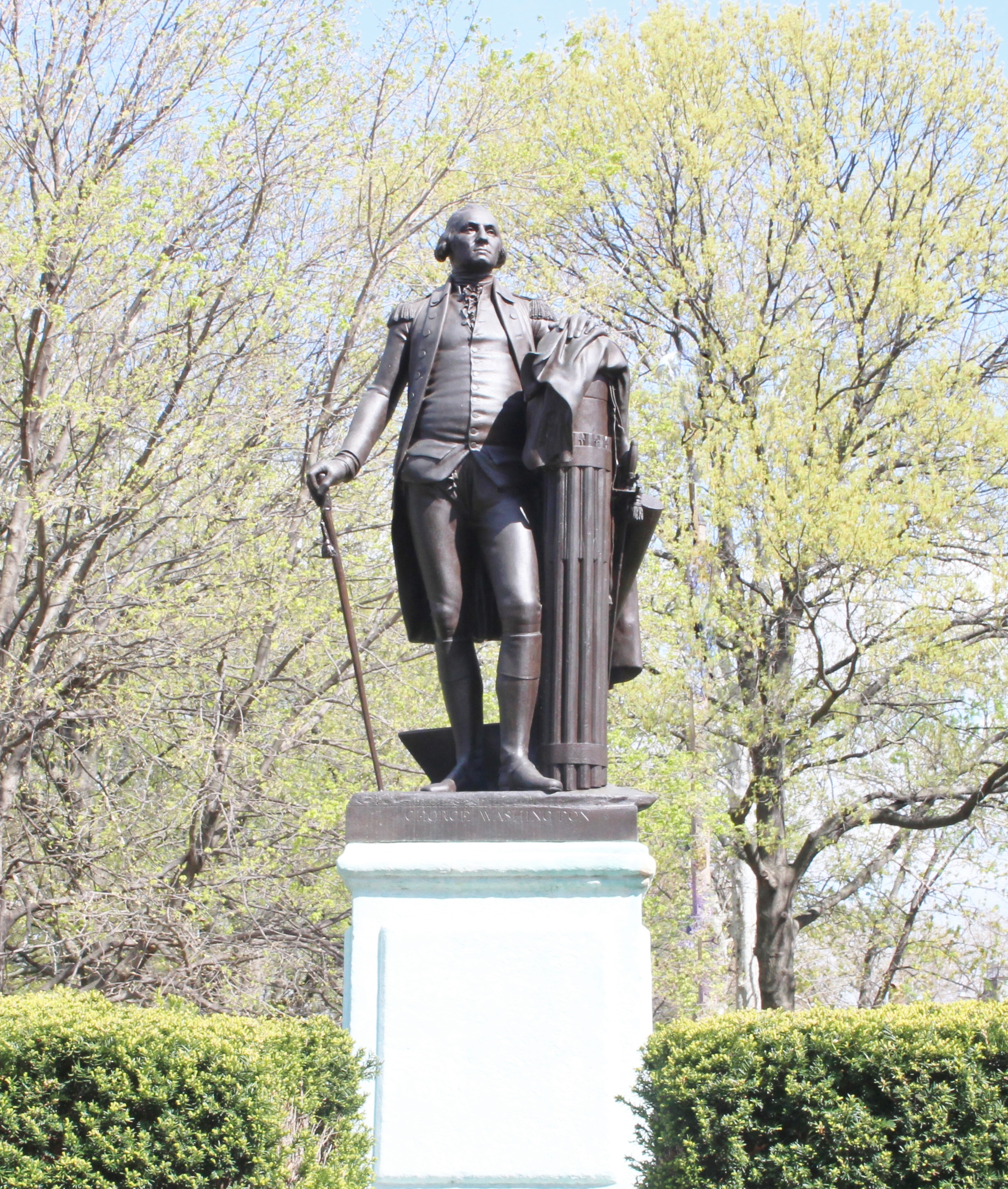
Copy (1856) of George Washington by Jean-Antoine Houdon (1791) in Lafayette Square in St. Louis.

==== New Hampshire ====
- Mount Washington, Mount Washington State Park
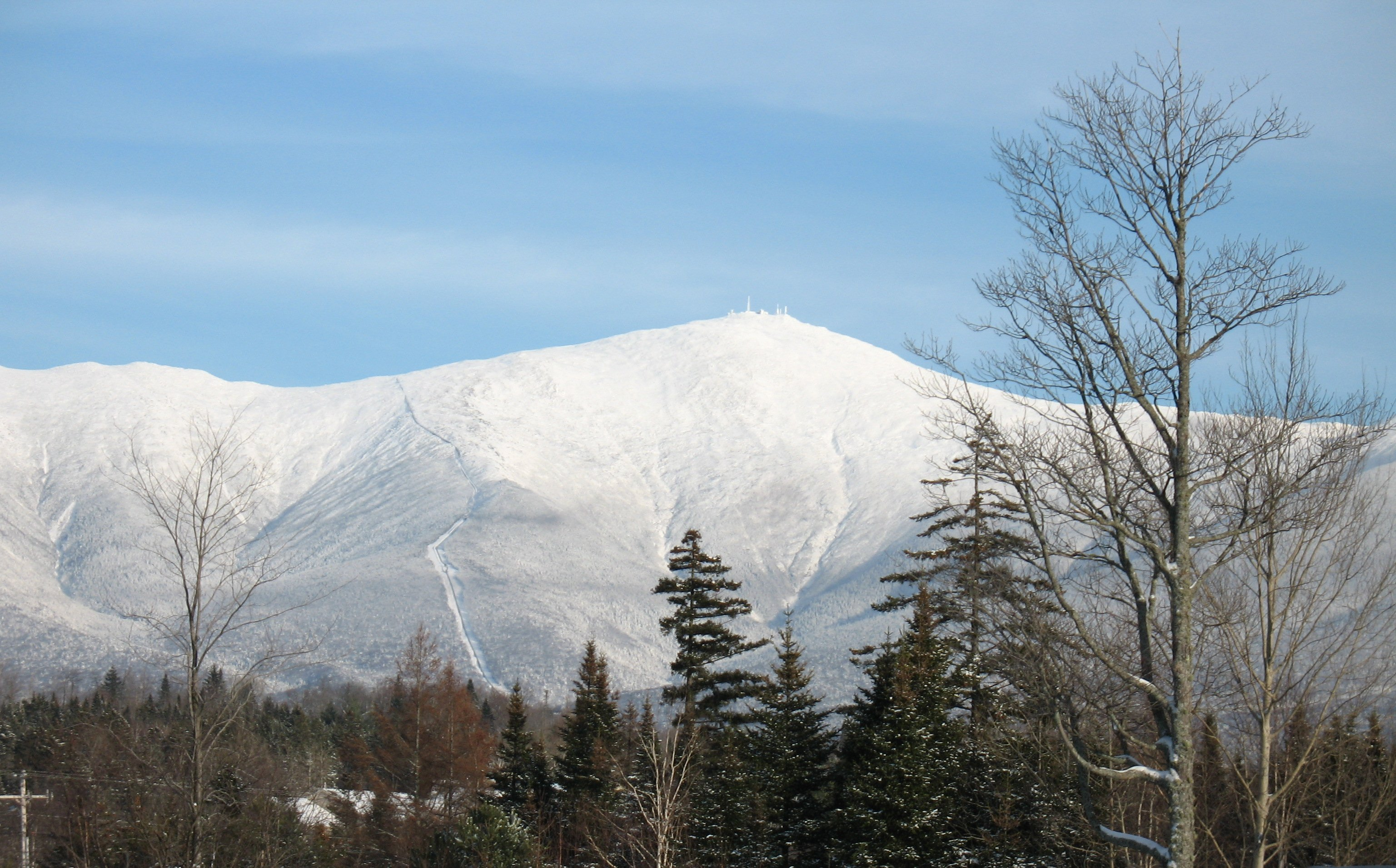
Mount Washington (New Hampshire)

==== New Jersey ====
- George Washington (c. 1876), by Fratelli Gianfranchi, Mill Hill, Trenton. Exhibited at the 1876 Centennial Exposition in Philadelphia, Pennsylvania.
- Trenton Battle Monument (1893), designed by architect John H. Duncan, Trenton
- George Washington (1893), by William Rudolf O'Donovan, atop Trenton Battle Monument, Trenton
- George Washington (1896), by Nels N. Alling, Market Square, Perth Amboy City Hall, Perth Amboy
- George Washington (1912), by J. Massey Rhind, Washington Park, Newark
- Bas-relief of General George Washington (1916), by Mahonri Mackintosh Young, Leonia Presbyterian Church, Leonia
- George Washington at Valley Forge (1918), by Carlo Abate, Camden County Hall of Justice, Camden
- Princeton Battle Monument (1922) by Frederick MacMonnies, Princeton, New Jersey
- George Washington (1927–1928), by Frederick Roth, Washington's Headquarters, Morristown
- George Washington Kneeling in Prayer (1991), by Donald De Lue (completed by Granville Carter), George Washington Memorial Park, Paramus. A copy of De Lue's 1967 statue is at the Freedoms Foundation in Valley Forge, Pennsylvania.
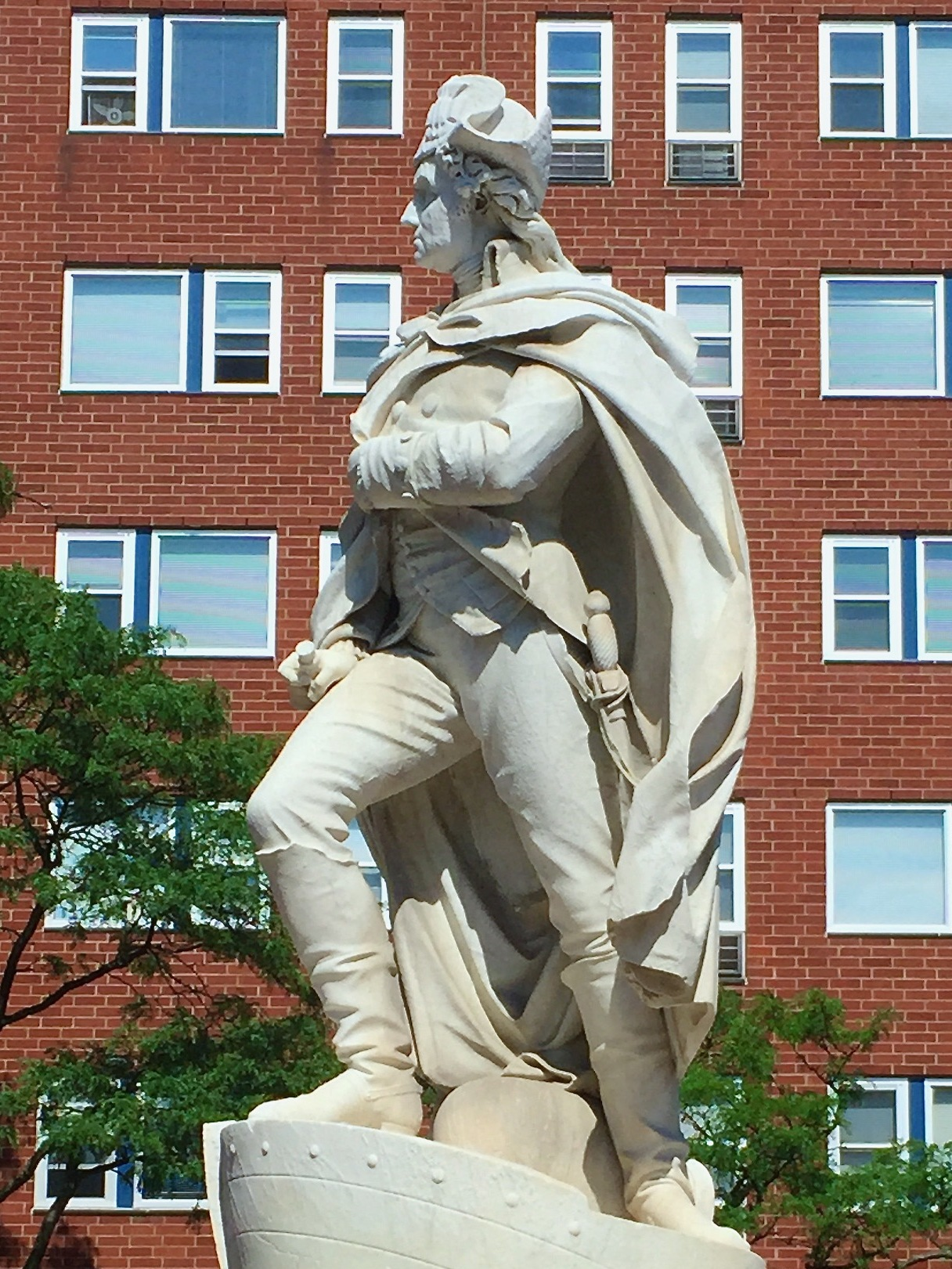
George Washington (c. 1876), by Fratelli Gianfranchi, Mill Hill, Trenton

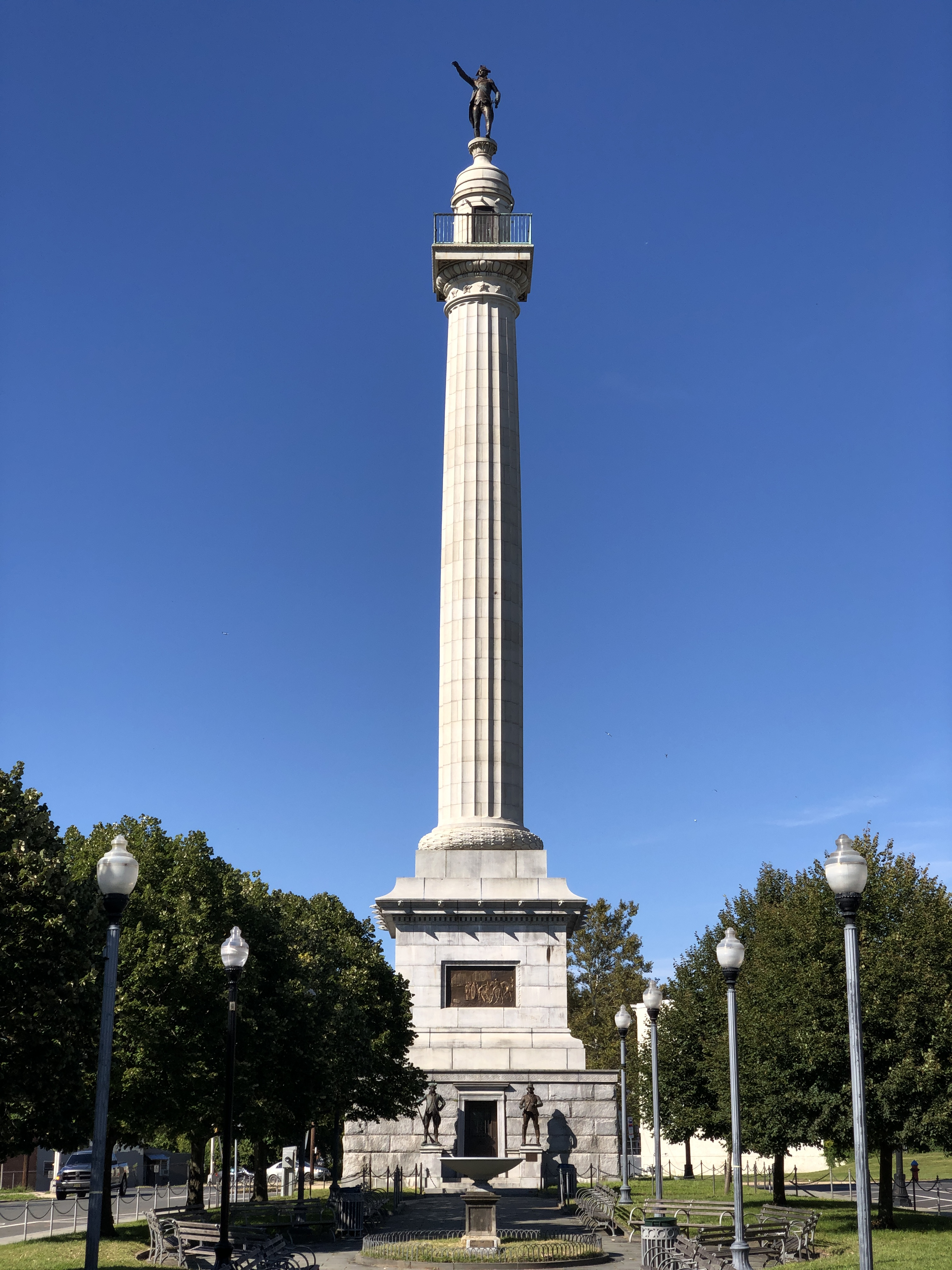
Trenton Battle Monument (1893), designed by architect John H. Duncan, Trenton

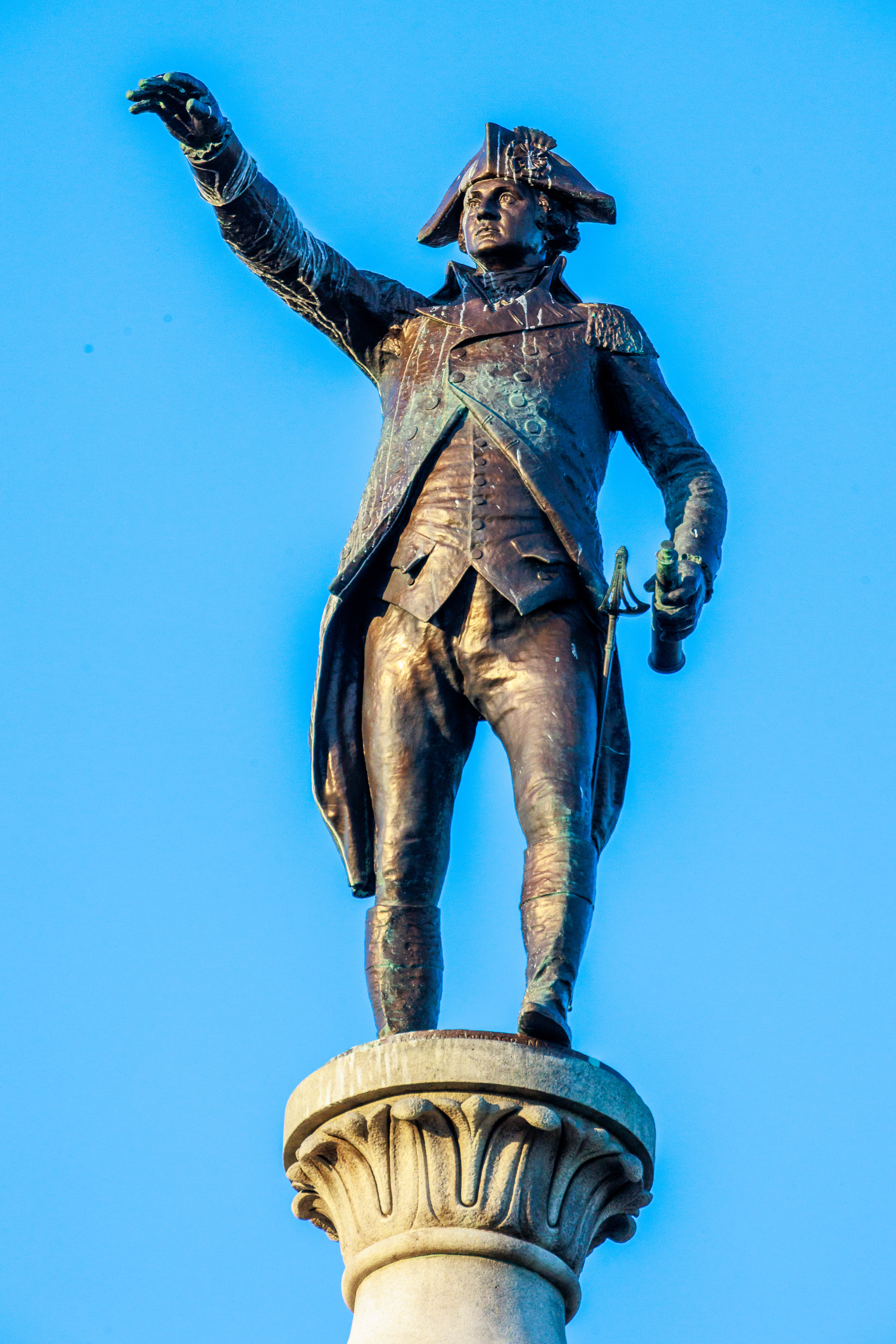
George Washington (1893), by William Rudolf O'Donovan, atop Trenton Battle Monument, Trenton

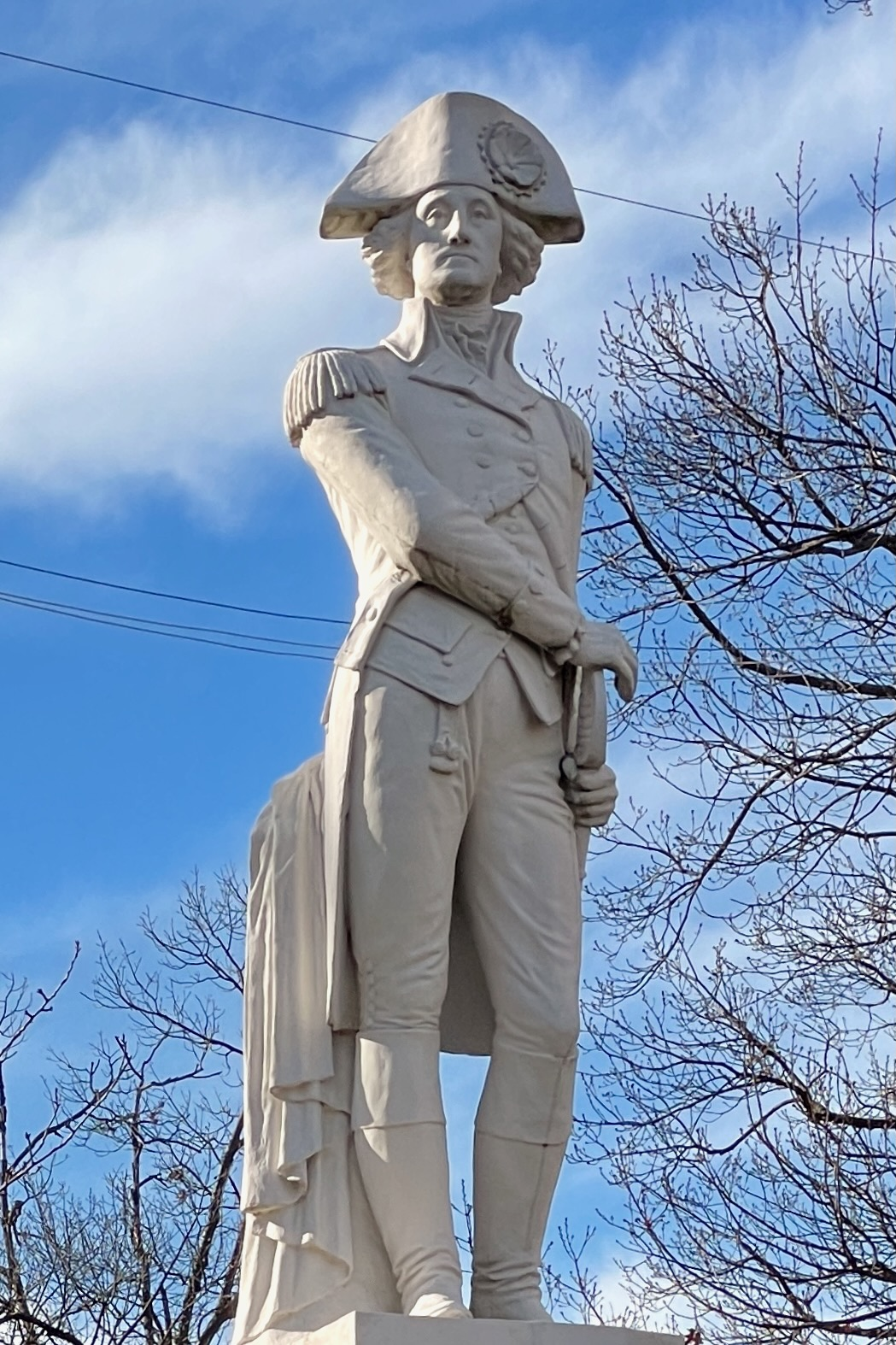
George Washington (1896), by Nels N. Alling, Market Square, Perth Amboy City Hall, Perth Amboy

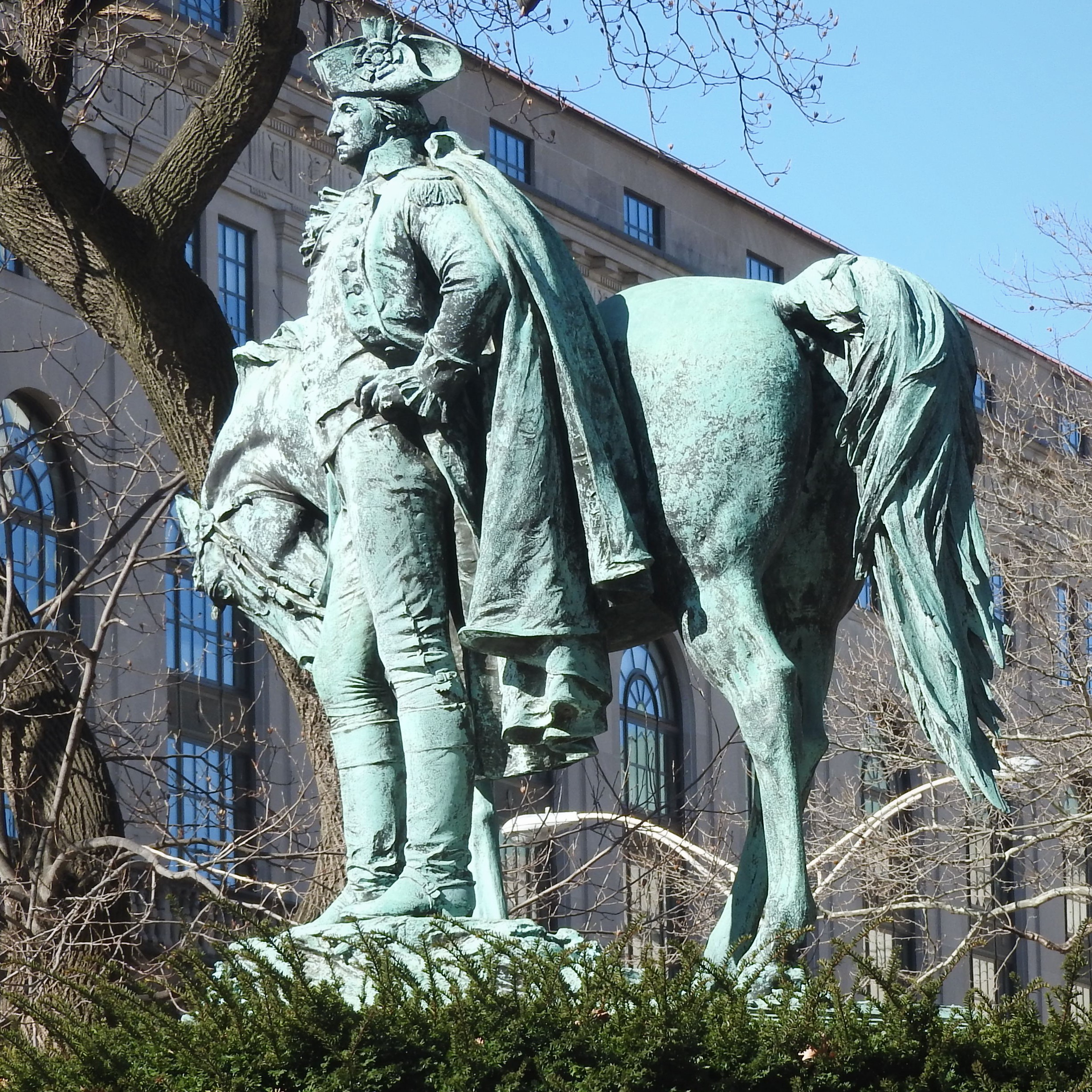
George Washington (1912), by J. Massey Rhind, Washington Park, Newark

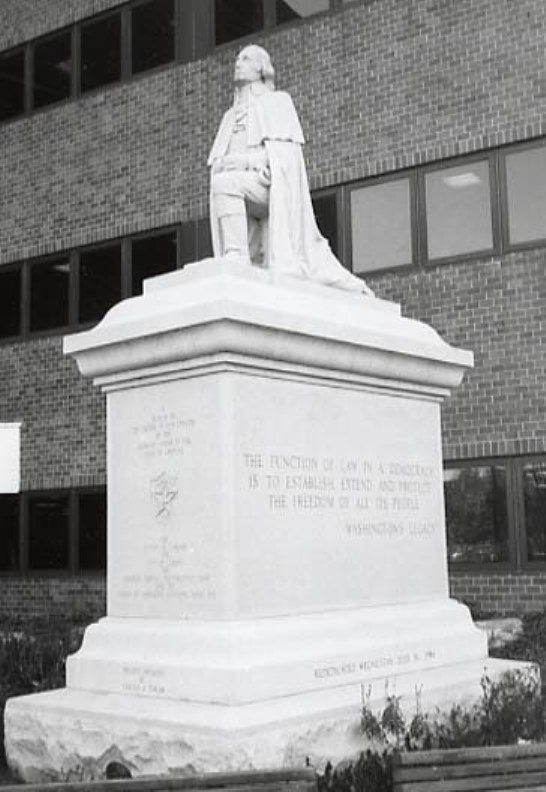
George Washington at Valley Forge (1918), by Carlo Abate, Camden County Hall of Justice, Camden

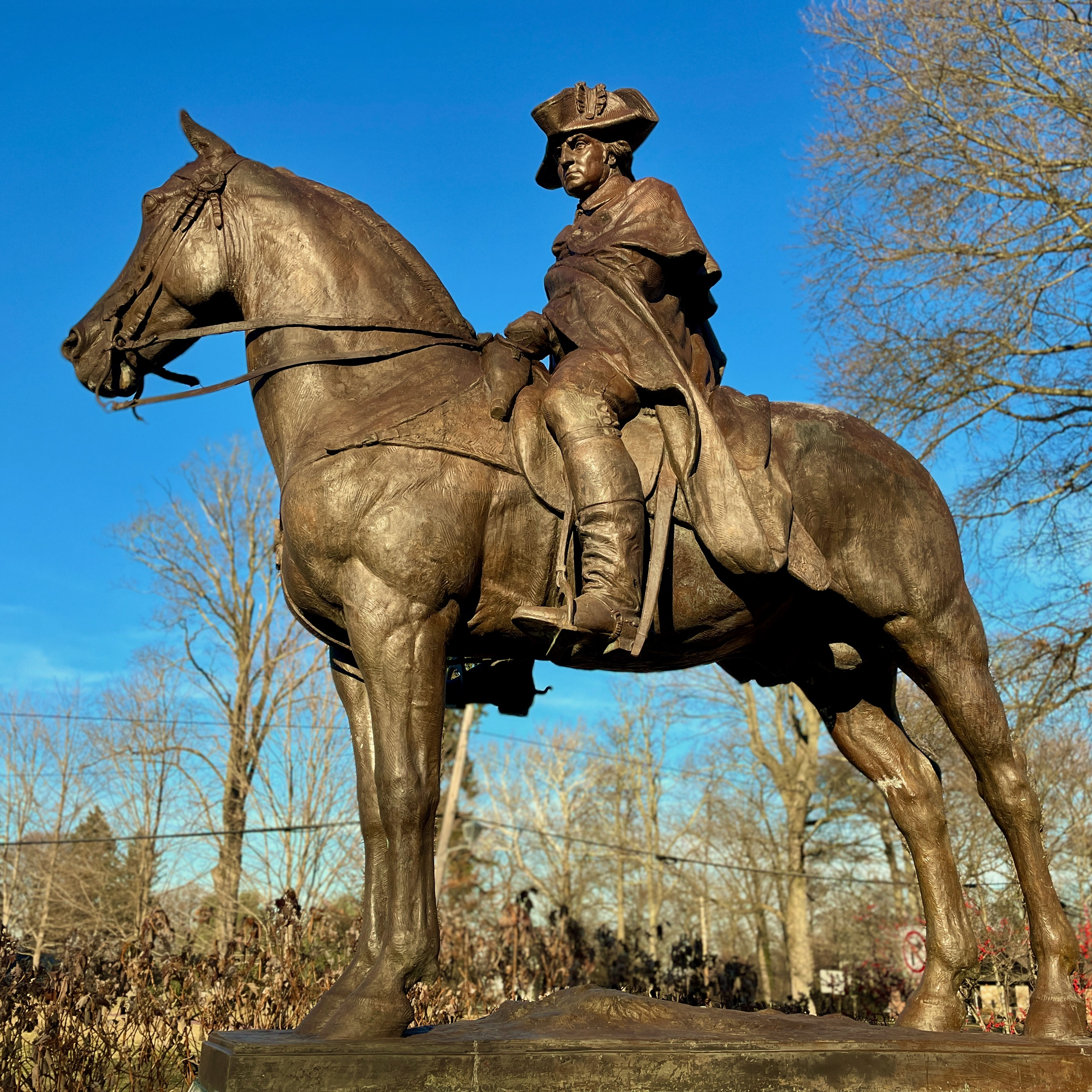
George Washington (1927–1928), by Frederick Roth, Washington's Headquarters, Morristown

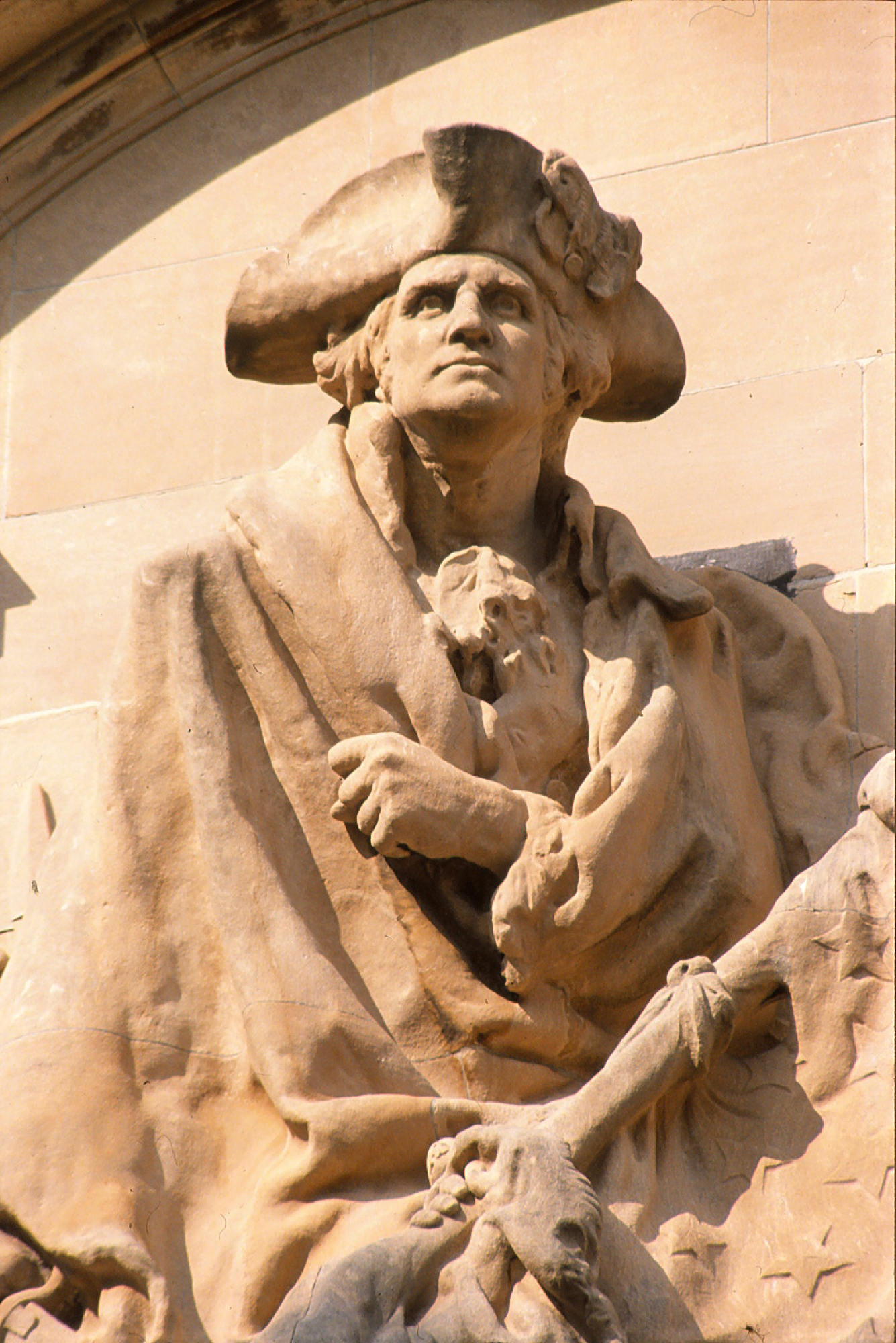
Princeton Battle Monument, Princeton

==== New York ====
===== New York City =====
- Bust of George Washington (1795), by Giuseppe Ceracchi, Metropolitan Museum of Art
- Washington Square Park (1826). Created as Washington Military Parade Ground; renamed 1871. Bounded by Waverly Place, University Place (Washington Square East), West 4th Street (Washington Square South), and Macdougal Street (Washington Square West).
- Equestrian statue of George Washington (1856), by Henry Kirke Brown, Union Square, Manhattan. This was the first equestrian statue of Washington.
- George Washington (1882), by John Quincy Adams Ward, in front of Federal Hall National Memorial, Wall Street, Manhattan
- Washington Square Arch (1892), Stanford White, architect, Washington Square Park, Manhattan. Two statues were later added:
  - George Washington as Commander-in-Chief, Accompanied by Fame and Valor (1914–16), by Hermon MacNeil
  - George Washington as President, Accompanied by Wisdom and Justice (1916–18), by Alexander Stirling Calder
- Equestrian statue of George Washington at Valley Forge (1901–06), by Henry Shrady, Continental Army Plaza, Brooklyn
- General George Washington in Prayer at Valley Forge (1904), by James E. Kelly, Federal Hall National Memorial, Manhattan
- George Washington Bridge (1930), over Hudson River
- Copy (ca. 1930) after George Washington by Jean-Antoine Houdon (1791), City College of New York, Manhattan
- George Washington as Master Mason (1959, this cast 1964), by Donald De Lue, Flushing Meadows–Corona Park, Queens. Exhibited at the 1964 New York World's Fair.
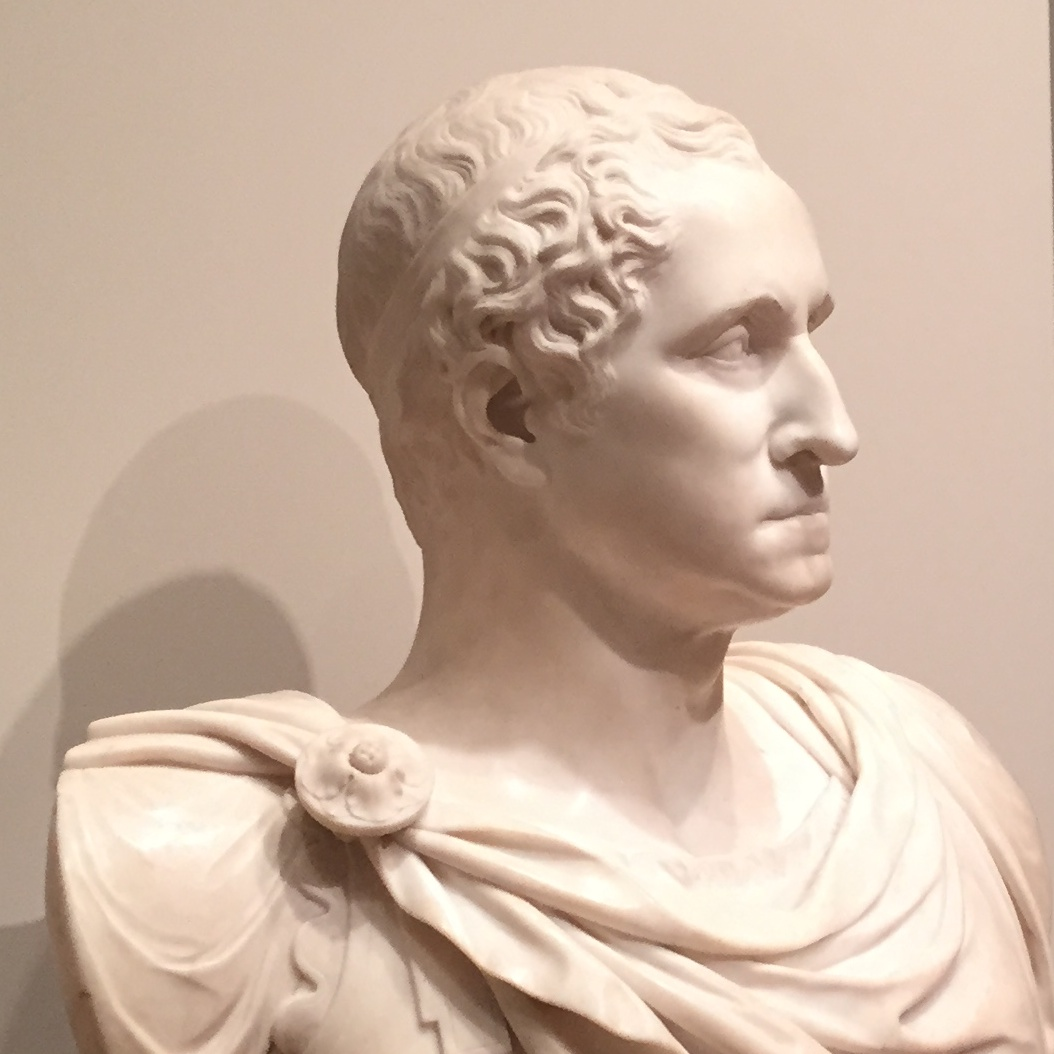
George Washington (1795), by Giuseppe Ceracchi, Metropolitan Museum of Art

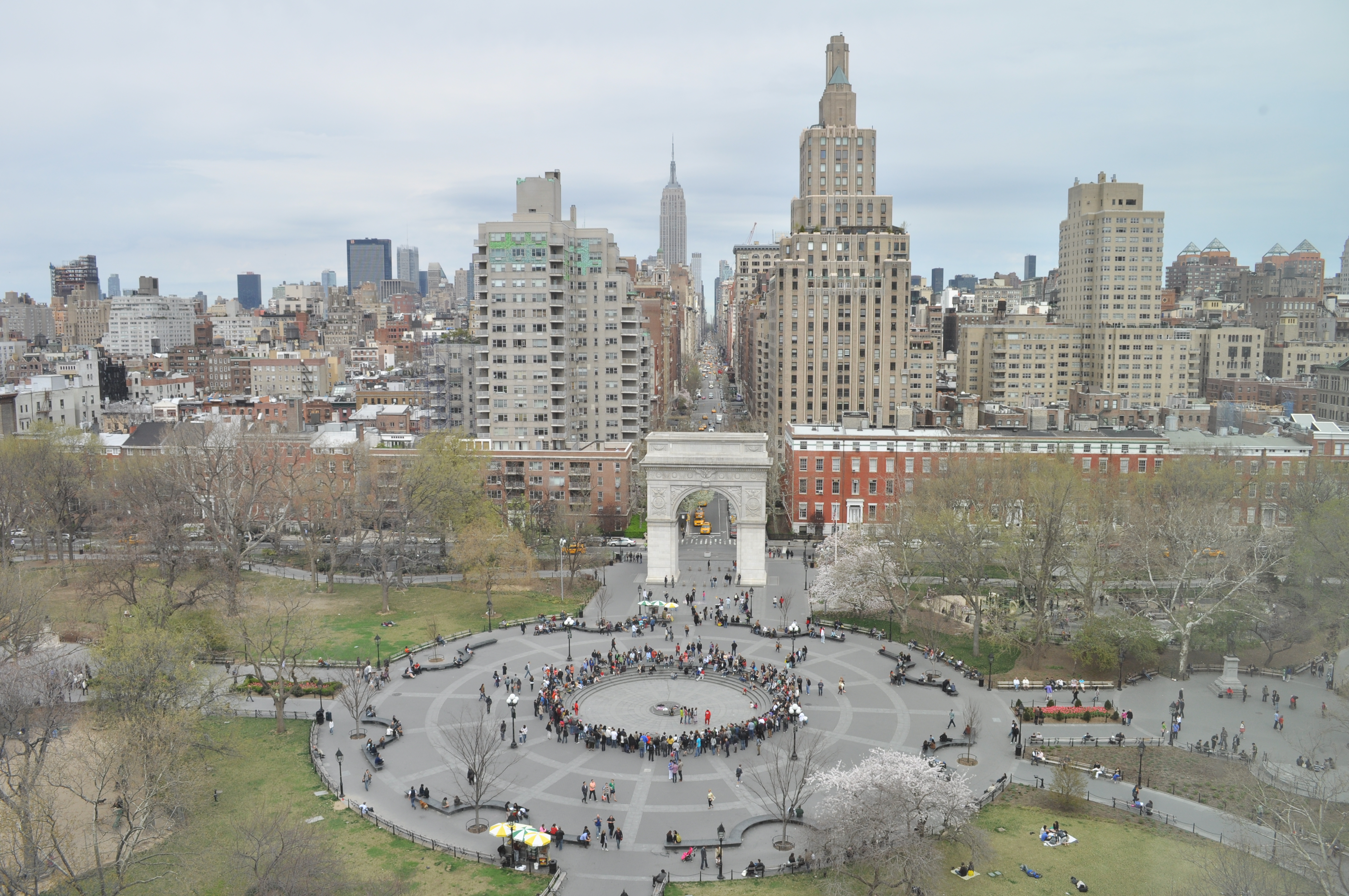
Washington Square Park (1826)

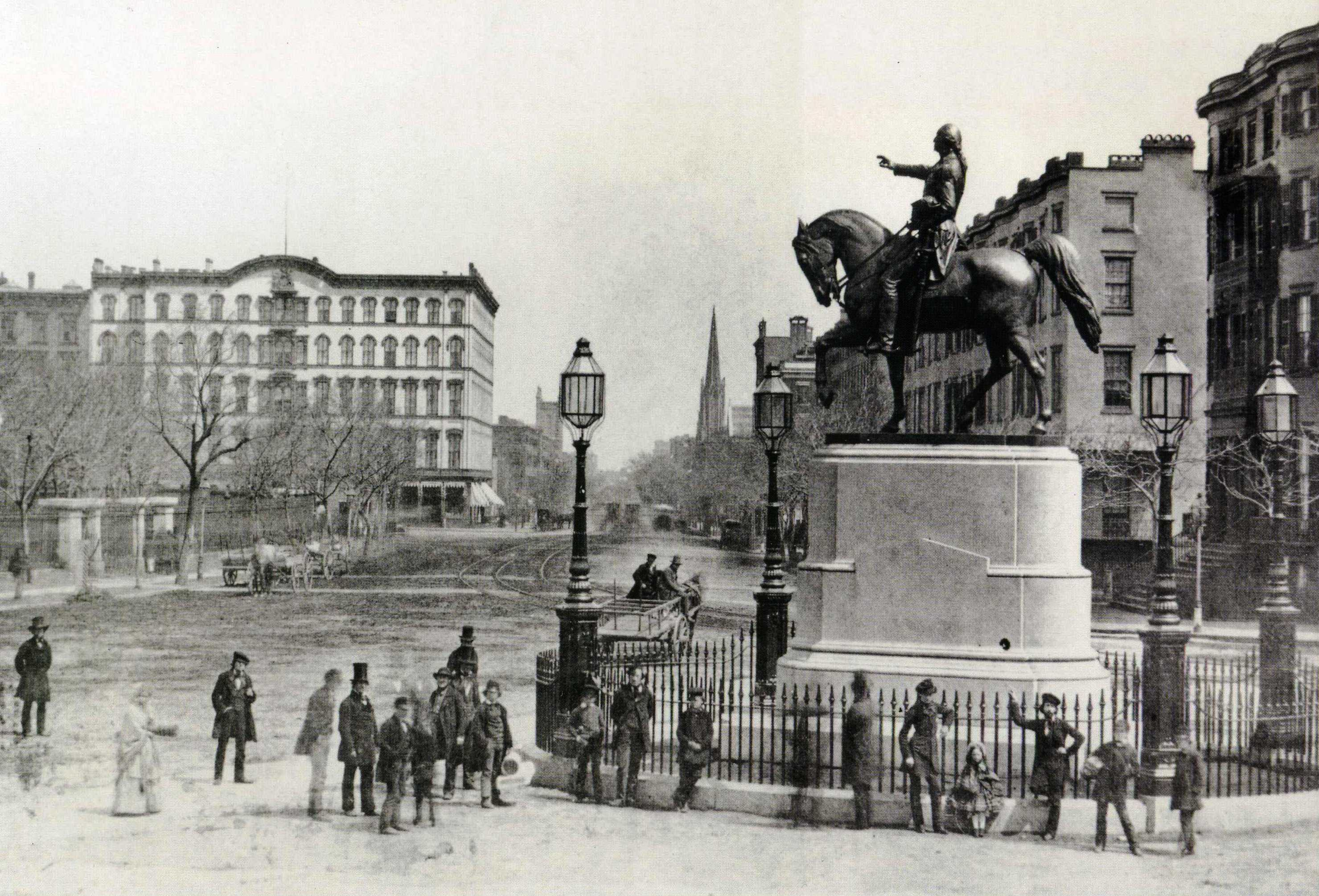
George Washington (1856), by Henry Kirke Brown, Union Square, Manhattan

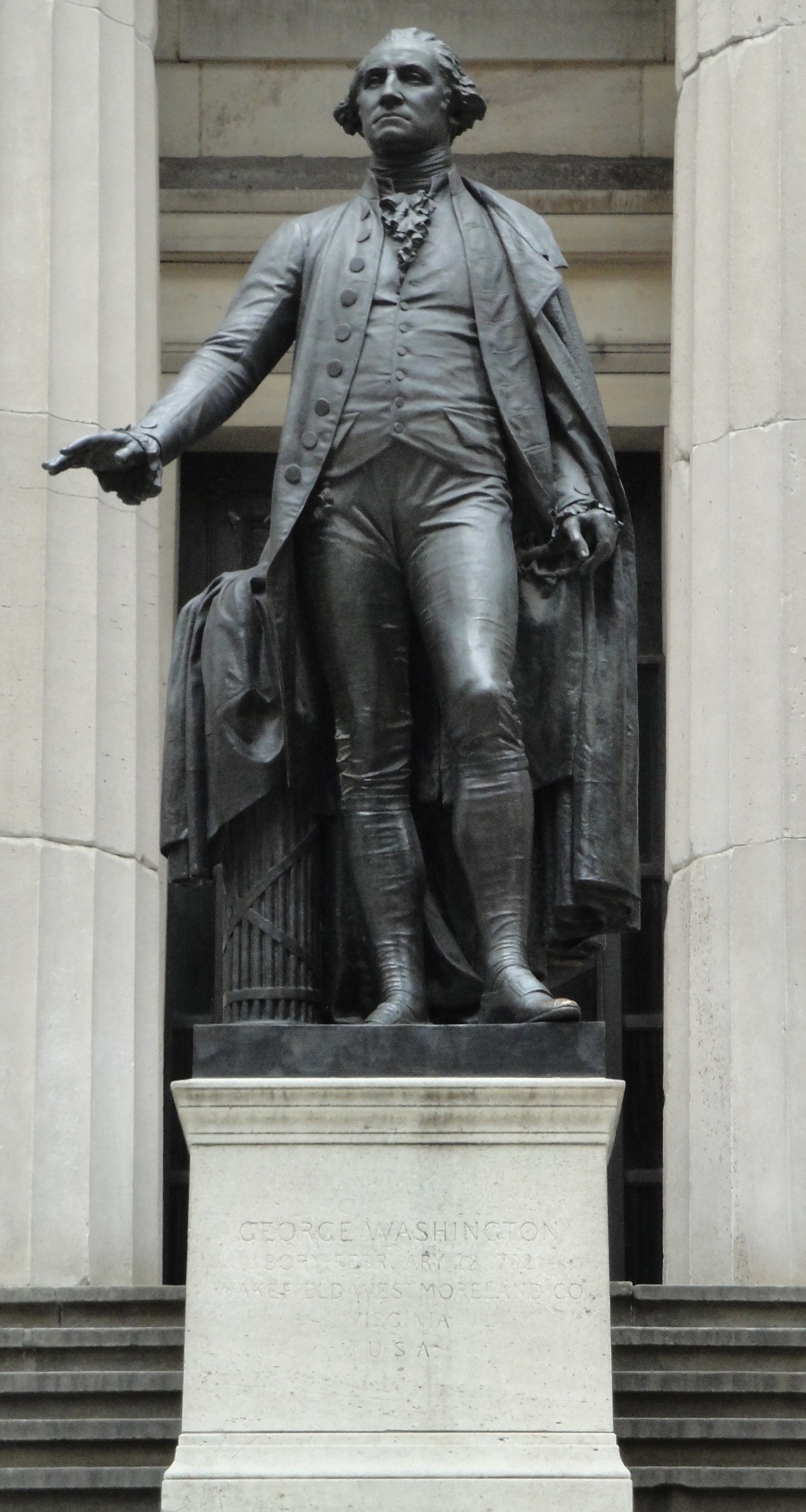
George Washington (1882), by John Quincy Adams Ward, Federal Hall National Memorial, Manhattan

Washington Square Arch (1892), Washington Square Park, Manhattan

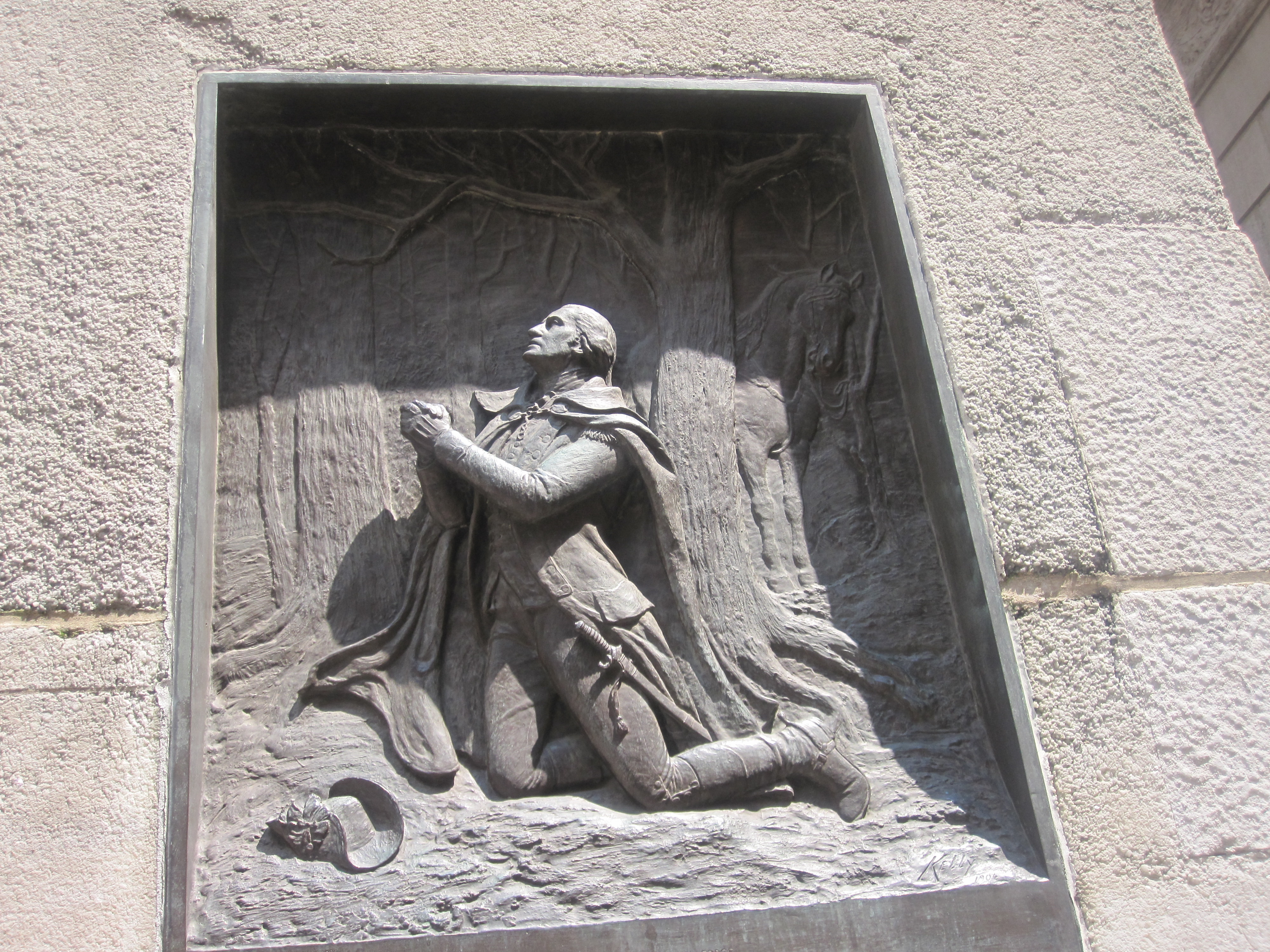
Washington in Prayer at Valley Forge (1904), by James E. Kelly, Federal Hall National Memorial, Manhattan

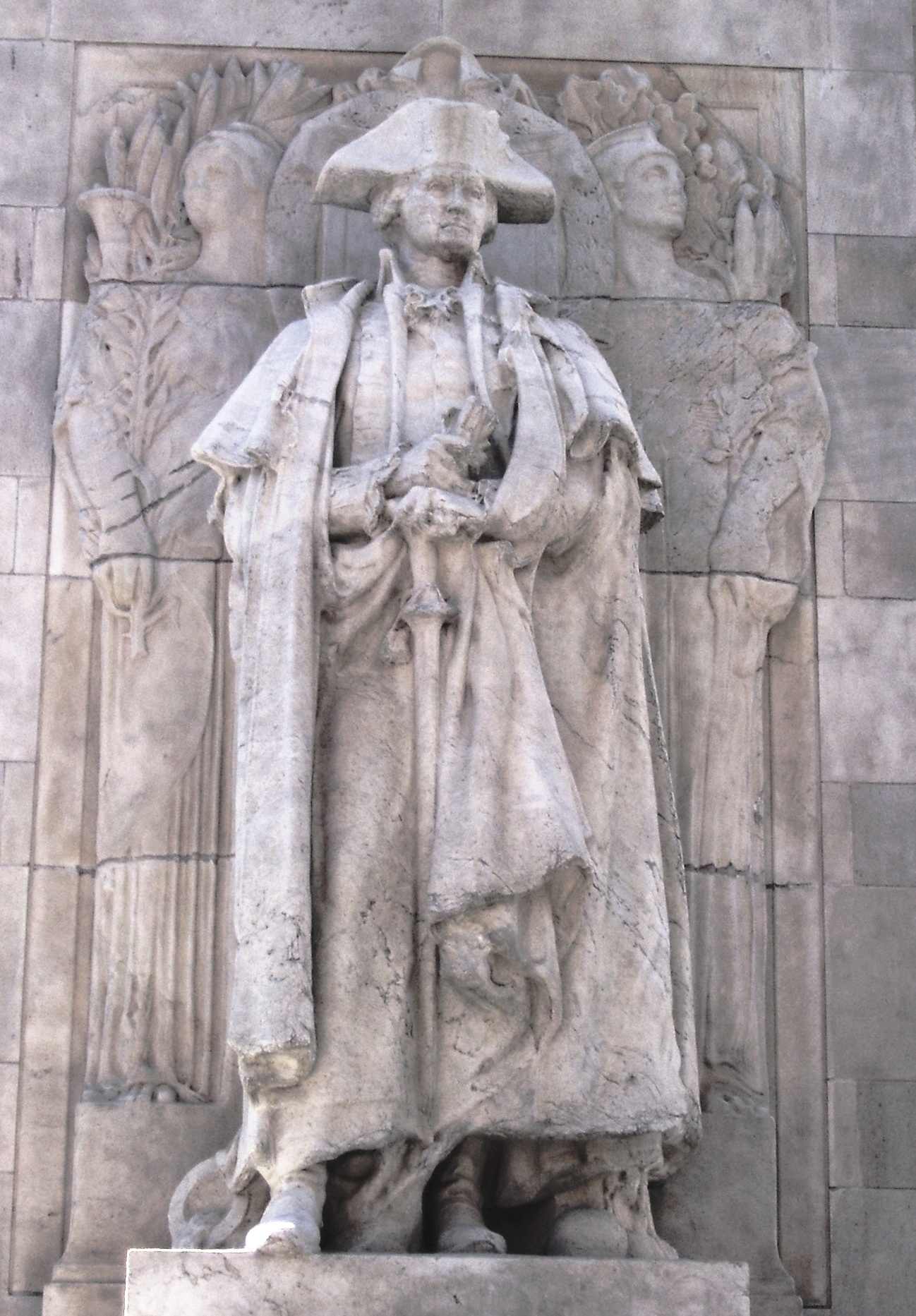
George Washington as Commander-in-Chief (1914–16), by Hermon MacNeil, Washington Square Arch

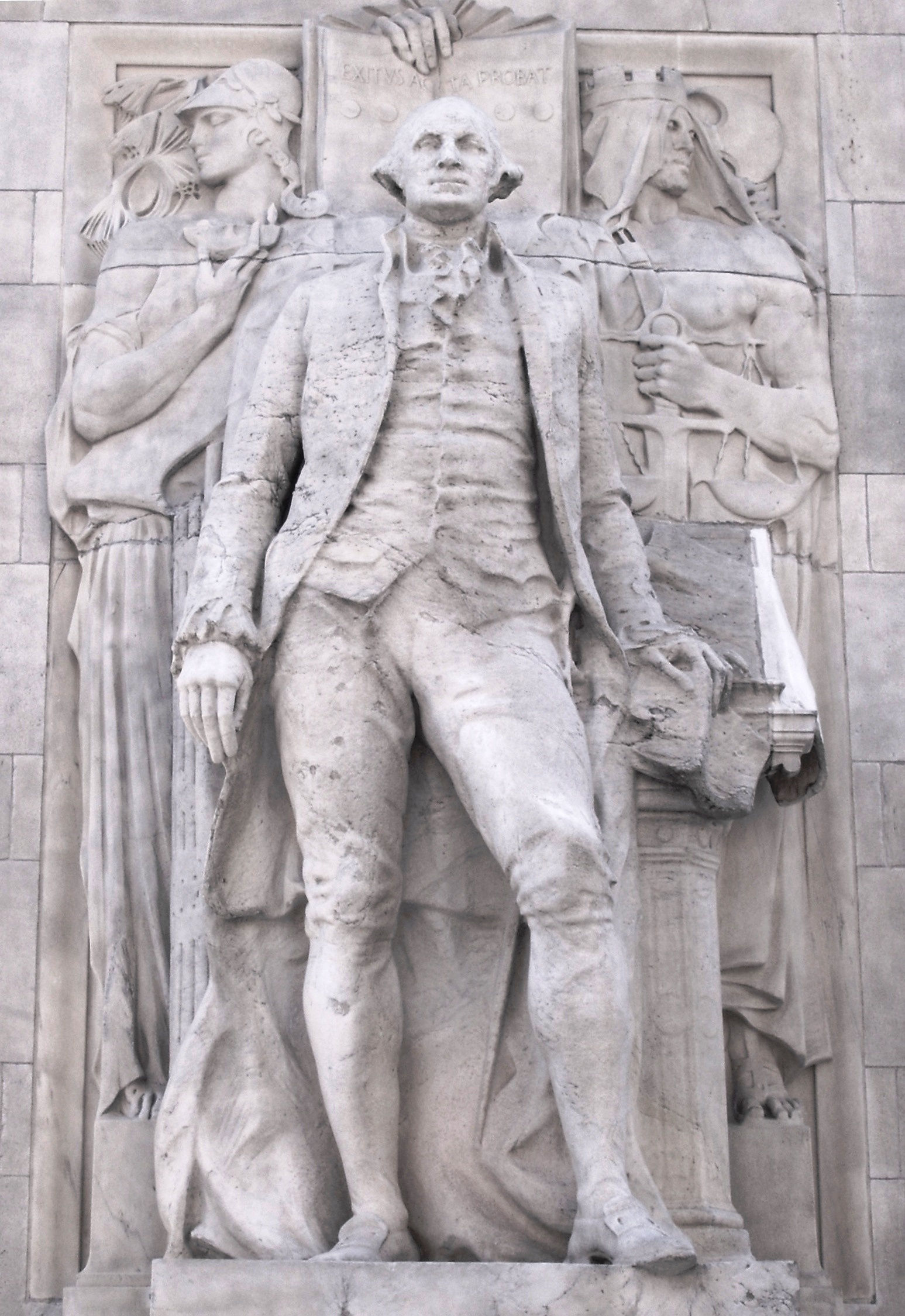
George Washington as President (1916–18), by Alexander Stirling Calder, Washington Square Arch

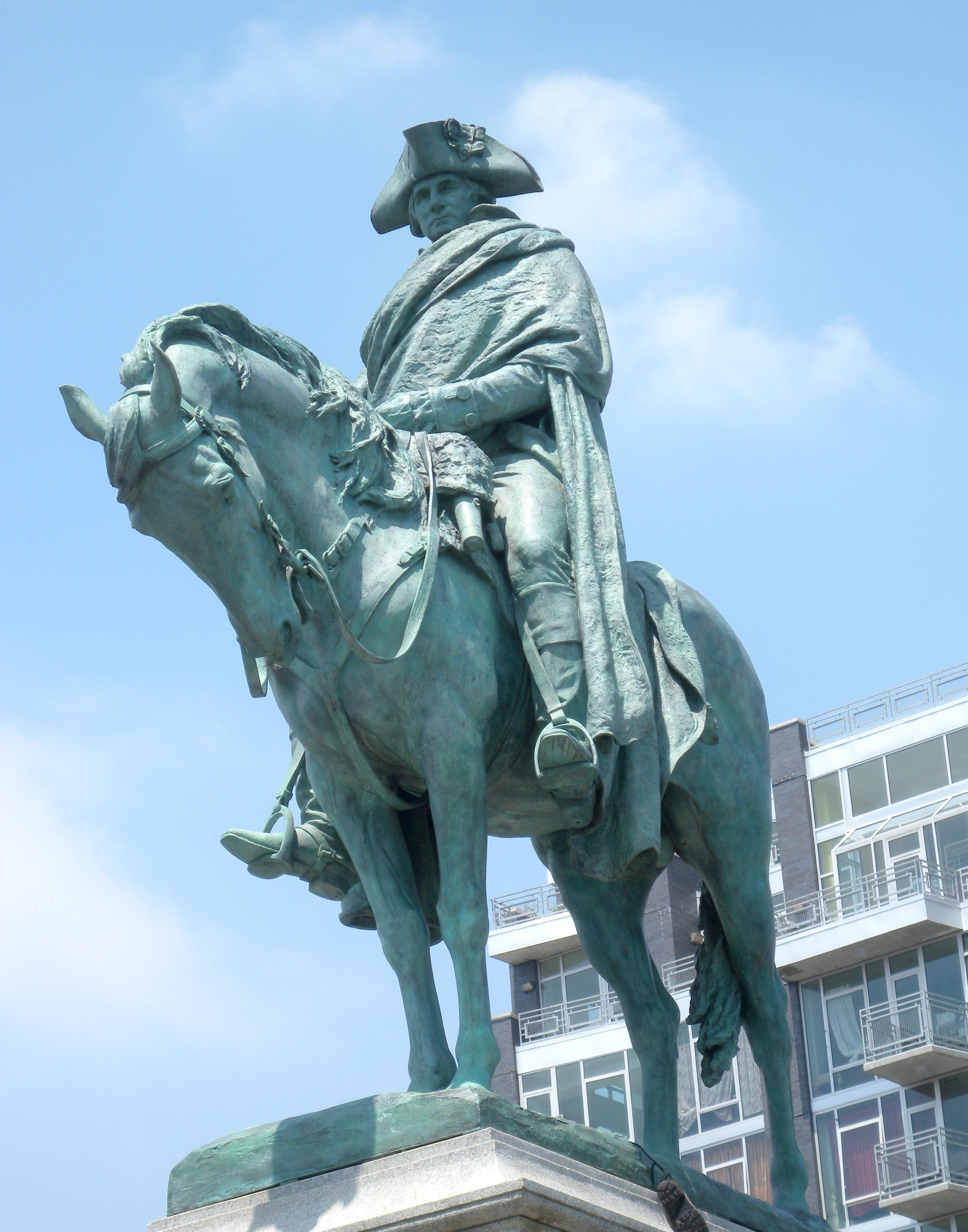
George Washington at Valley Forge (1901–06), by Henry Shrady, Continental Army Plaza, Brooklyn

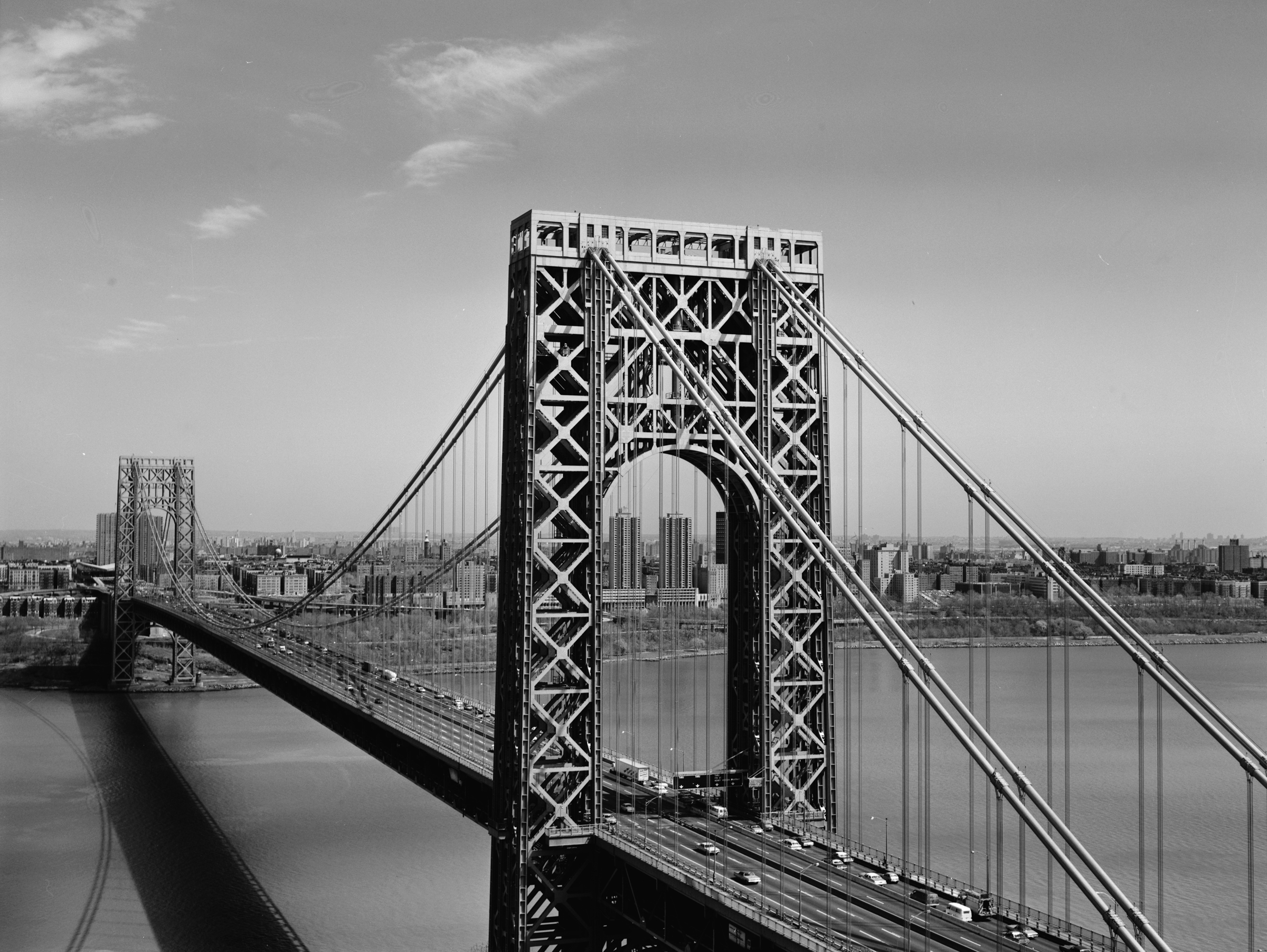
George Washington Bridge (1930)

===== Outside New York City =====
- Washington Park, Albany (1870)
- George Washington (1887), by William Rudolf O'Donovan, housed in the Tower of Victory, Washington's Headquarters State Historic Site, Newburgh
- Copy after George Washington by Jean-Antoine Houdon (1791), United States Military Academy, West Point
- George Washington Monument (1916), United States Military Academy, West Point. A replica of Henry Kirke Brown's Union Square, Manhattan, equestrian statue (1856).
- Copy (1932) after George Washington by Jean-Antoine Houdon (1791), Alfred E. Smith Building, Albany
- George Washington (1932), unknown Italian sculptor, Washington Square Park, Clyde
- The Vision (George Washington at Valley Forge) (1959), by Benjamin Thorne Gilbert, Utica Public Library, Utica
- George Washington (1976), by Josip Turkalj, Old County Hall, Buffalo
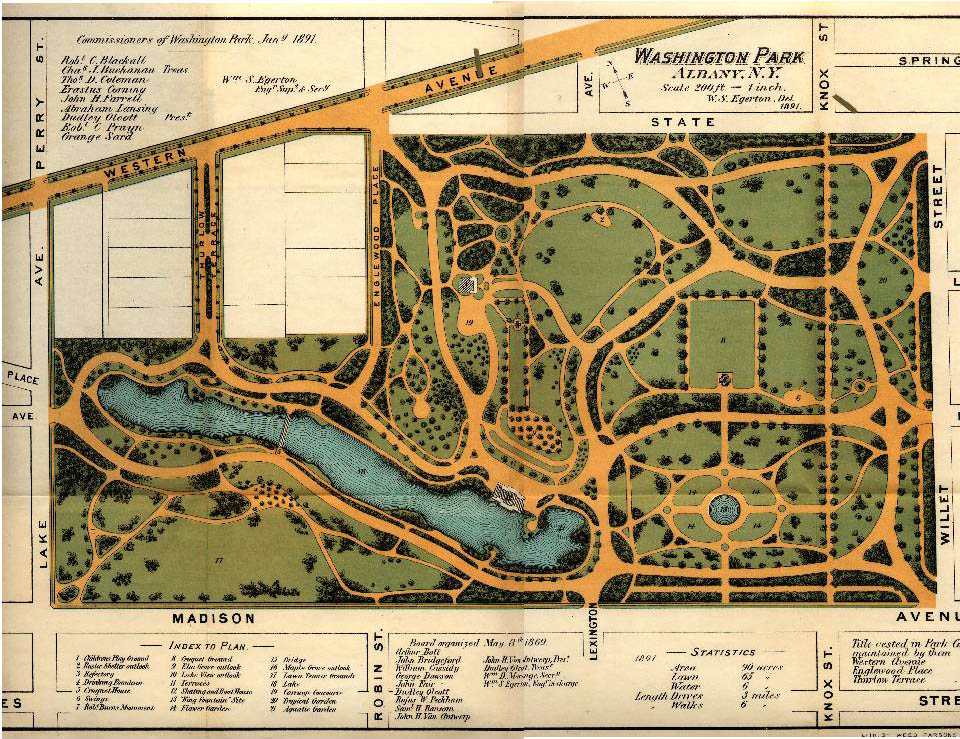
Washington Park, Albany

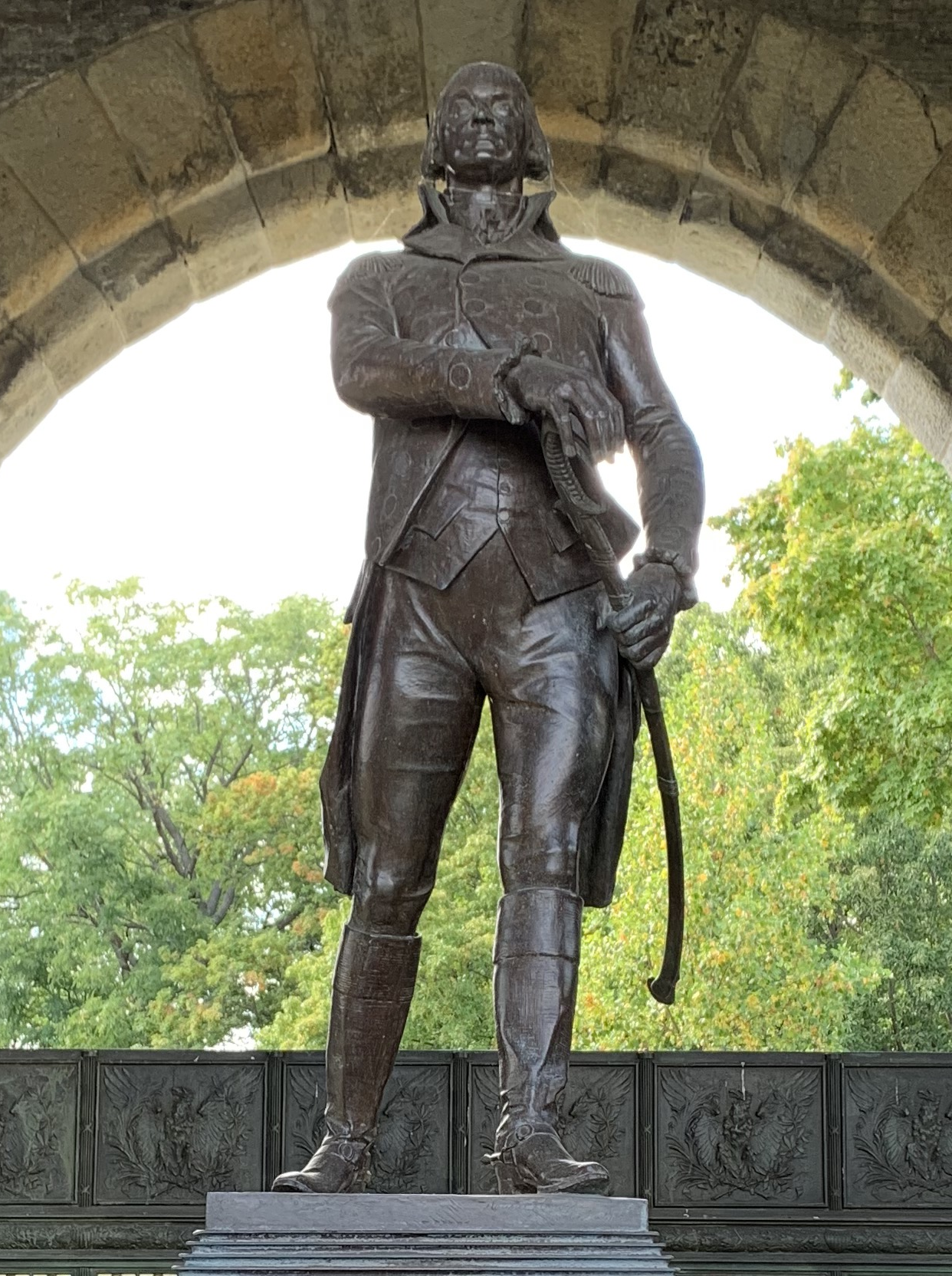
George Washington (1887), Tower of Victory, Newburgh

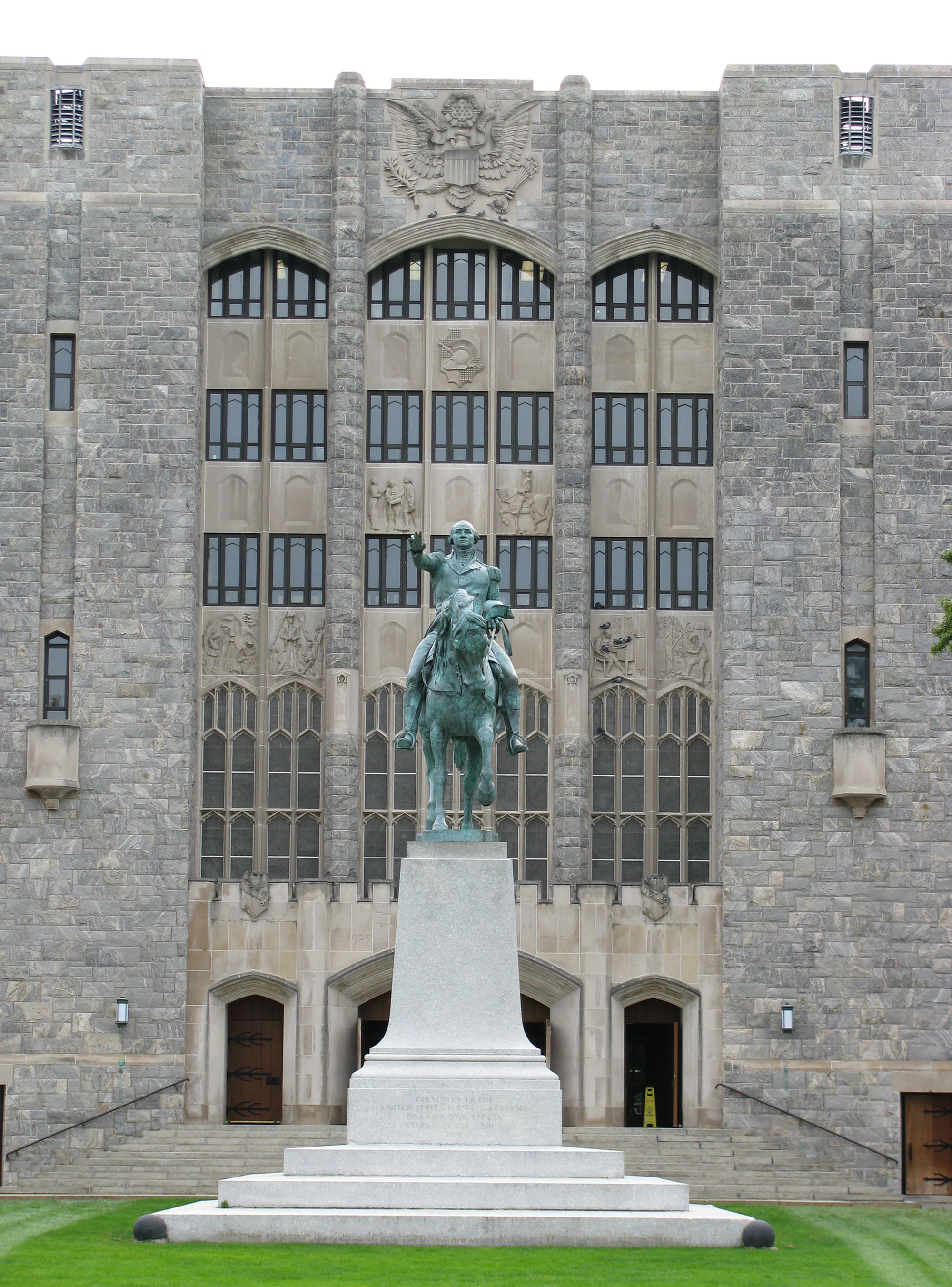
Washington Monument (1916), United States Military Academy, West Point

==== North Carolina ====
- Copy (1857) after George Washington by Jean-Antoine Houdon (1791), North Carolina State Capitol, Raleigh
- Copy (1910) plaster, after George Washington by Antonio Canova (1820, destroyed by fire 1831), North Carolina Museum of History, Raleigh
- Copy (1970) after George Washington by Antonio Canova (1820, destroyed by fire 1831), North Carolina State Capitol, Raleigh
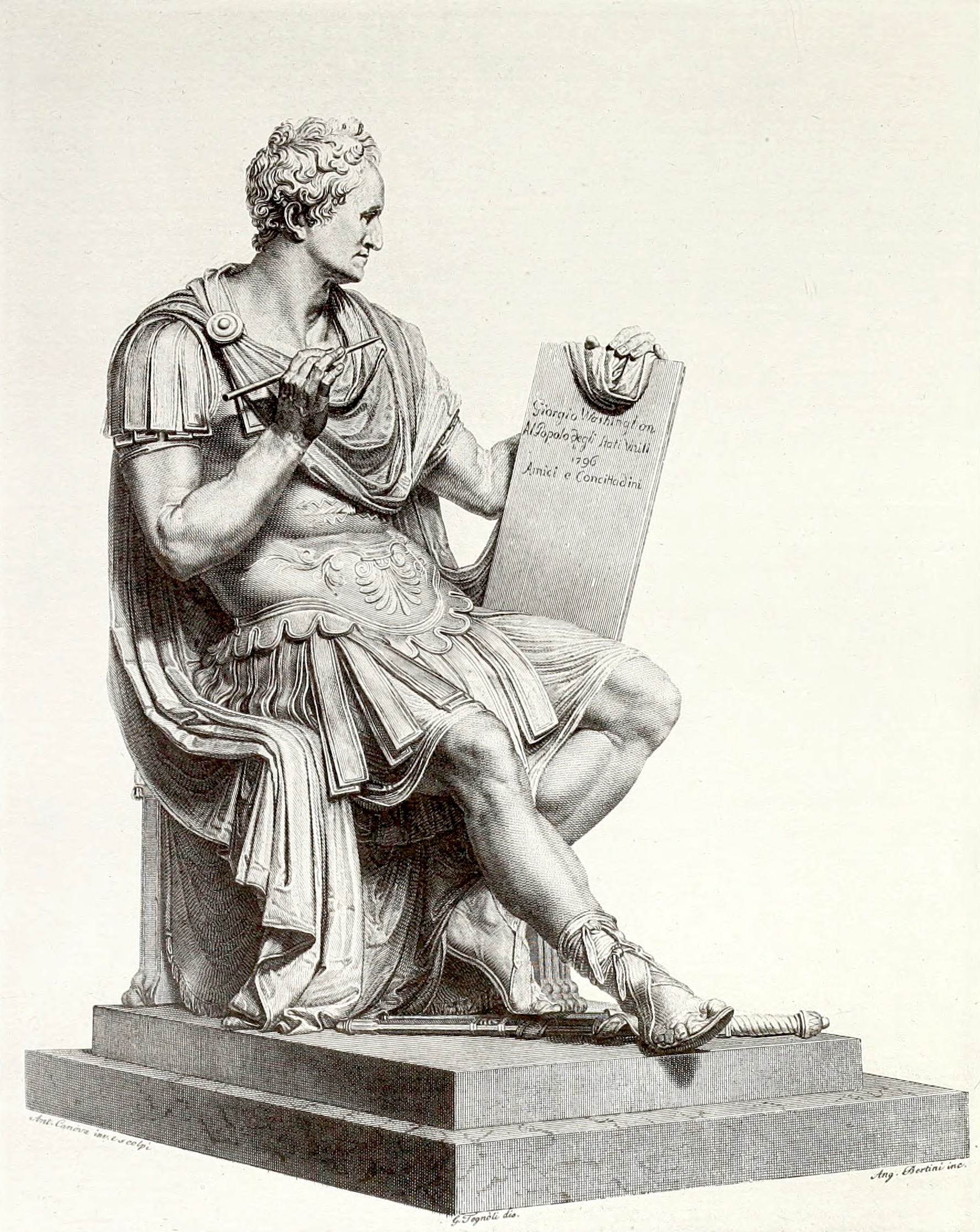
George Washington (1820, destroyed by fire 1831), North Carolina State House, Raleigh

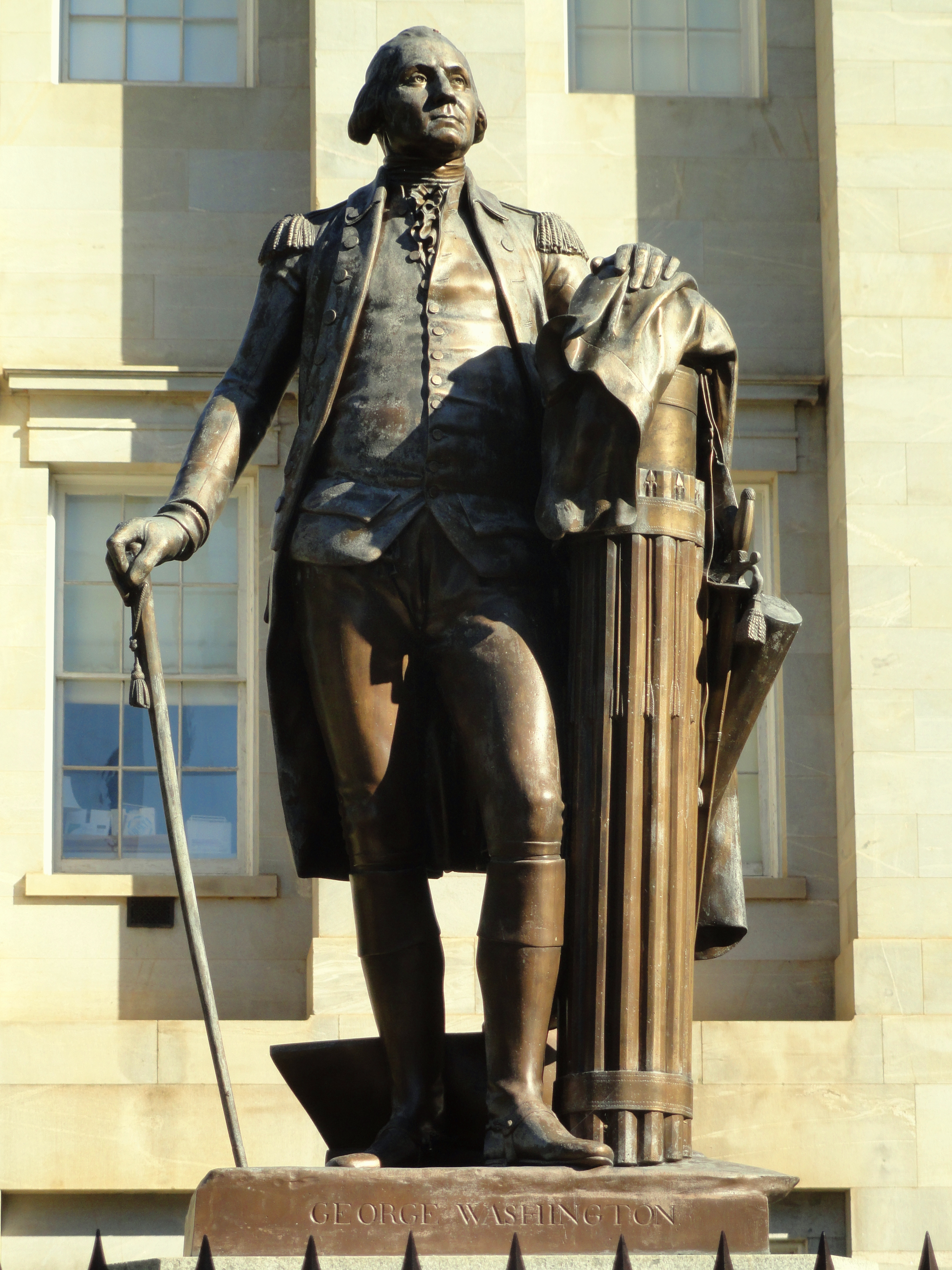
George Washington (1857), North Carolina State Capitol, Raleigh

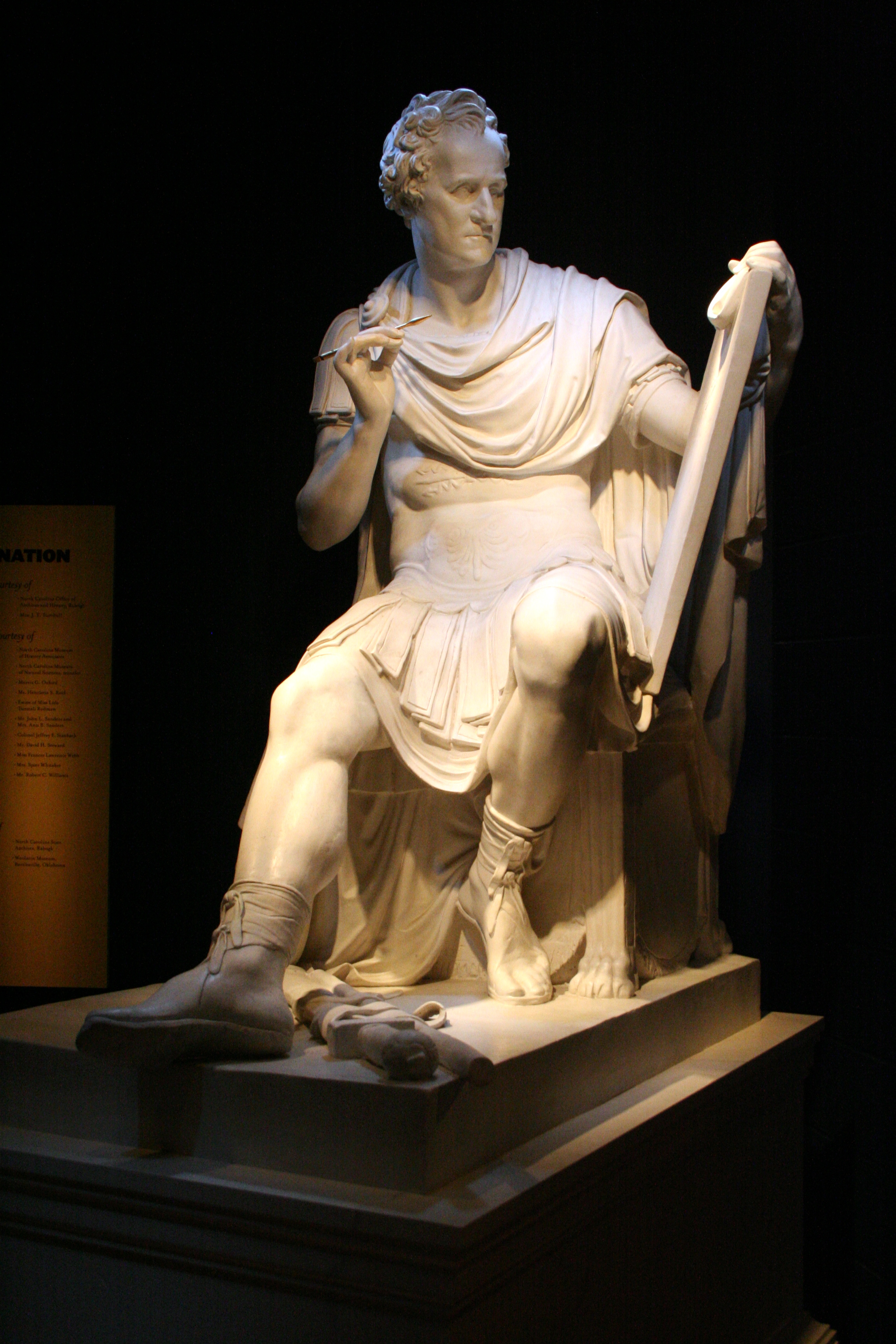
George Washington (1910), North Carolina Museum of History, Raleigh

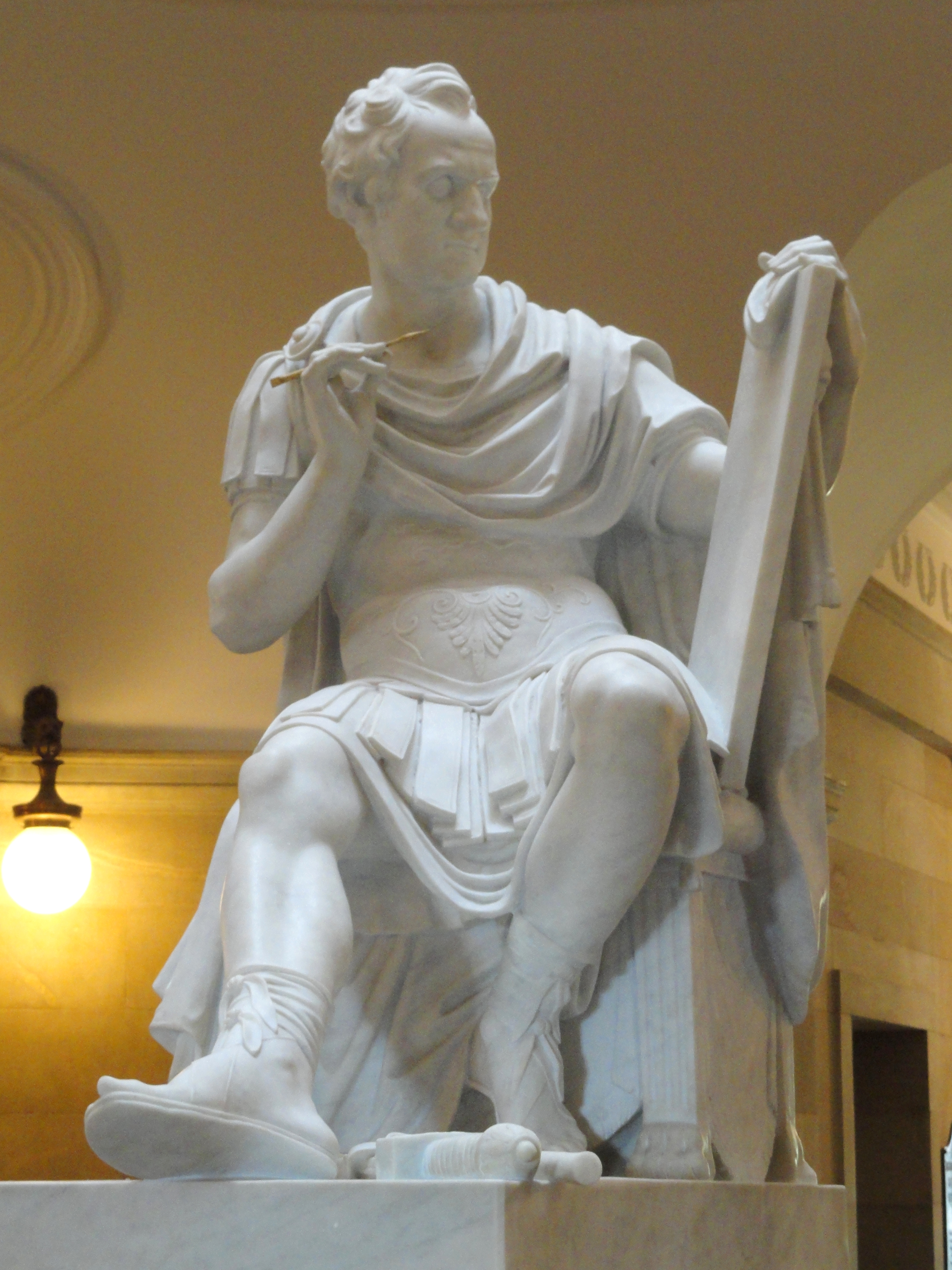
George Washington (1970), North Carolina State Capitol, Raleigh

==== Ohio ====
- Washington Park, Cincinnati (1863)
- Copy (1860 by William James Hubard) of George Washington by Jean-Antoine Houdon (1791), Alumni Hall, Miami University, Oxford
- George Washington Monument (1972–73), by William McVey, Washington Square, Anthony J. Celebrezze Federal Building, Cleveland
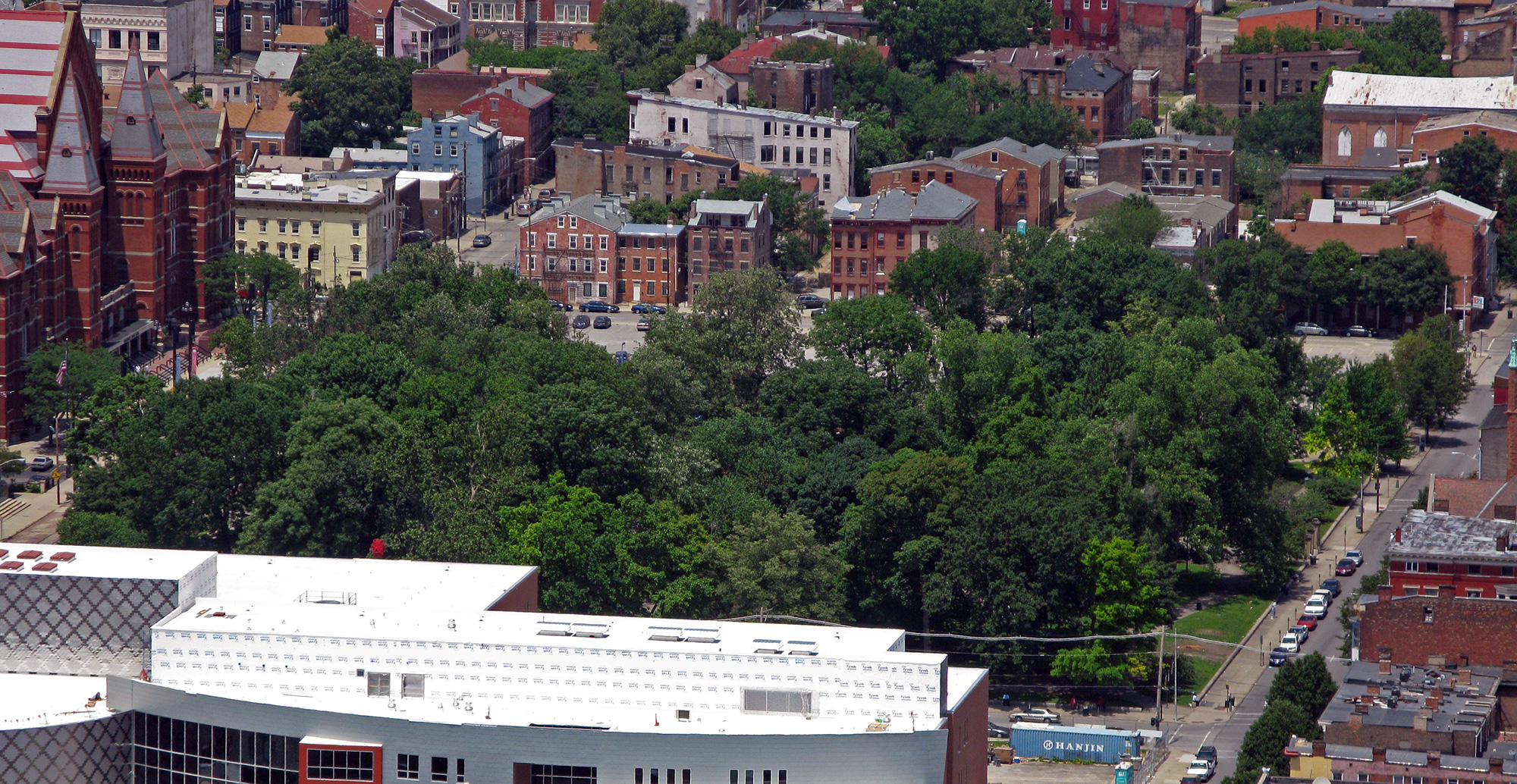
Washington Park (Cincinnati, Ohio)

==== Oklahoma ====
- George Washington (1987), by Yon Sim Pak, Rogers State University, Claremore

==== Oregon ====
- Mount Washington (Oregon)
- Washington Park, Portland (1909)
- George Washington (1927), by Pompeo Coppini, Friendship Masonic Lodge 160, Portland (Toppled in June 2020, will be re-installed at a yet to be determined date)
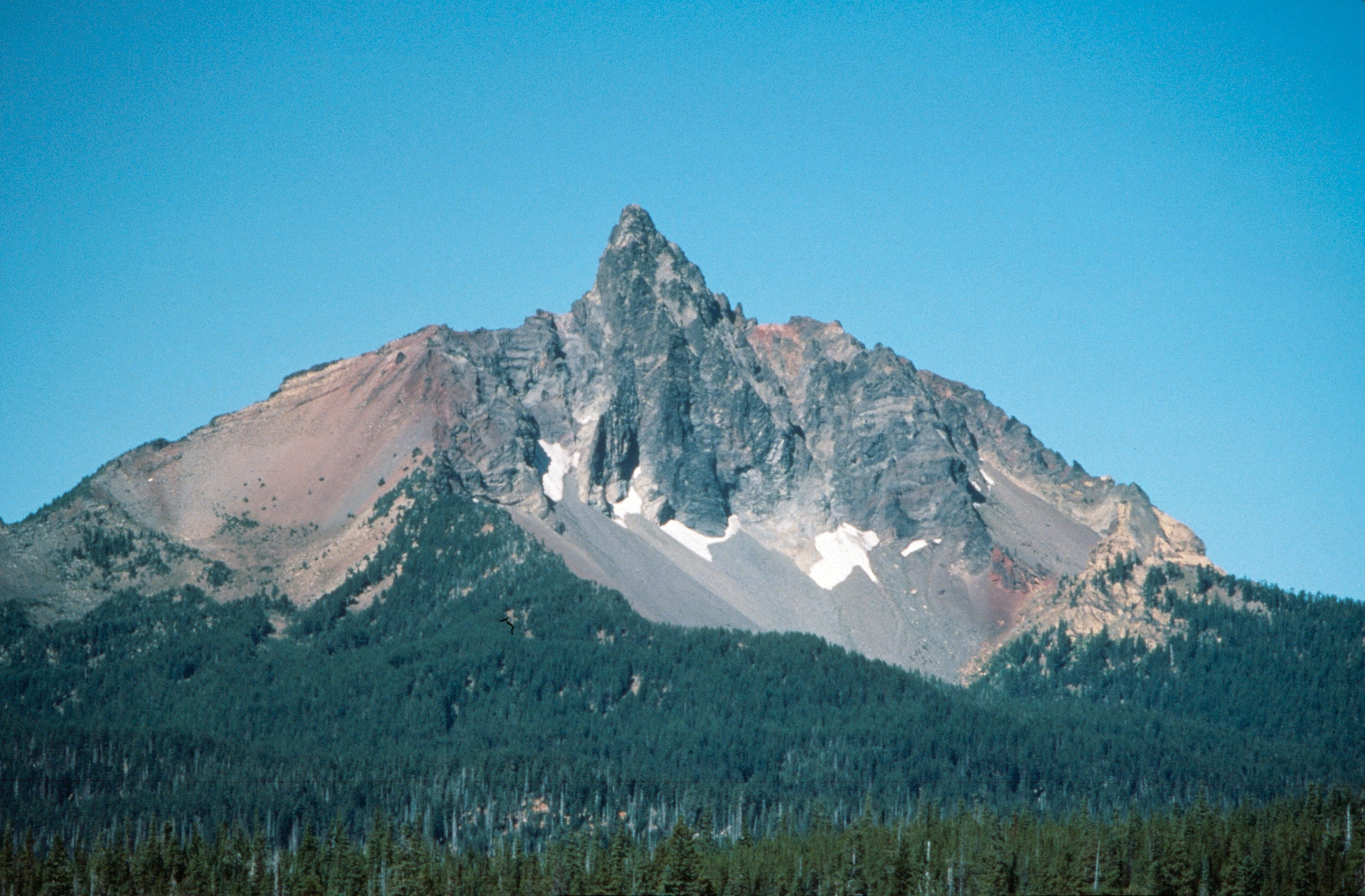
Mount Washington (Oregon)

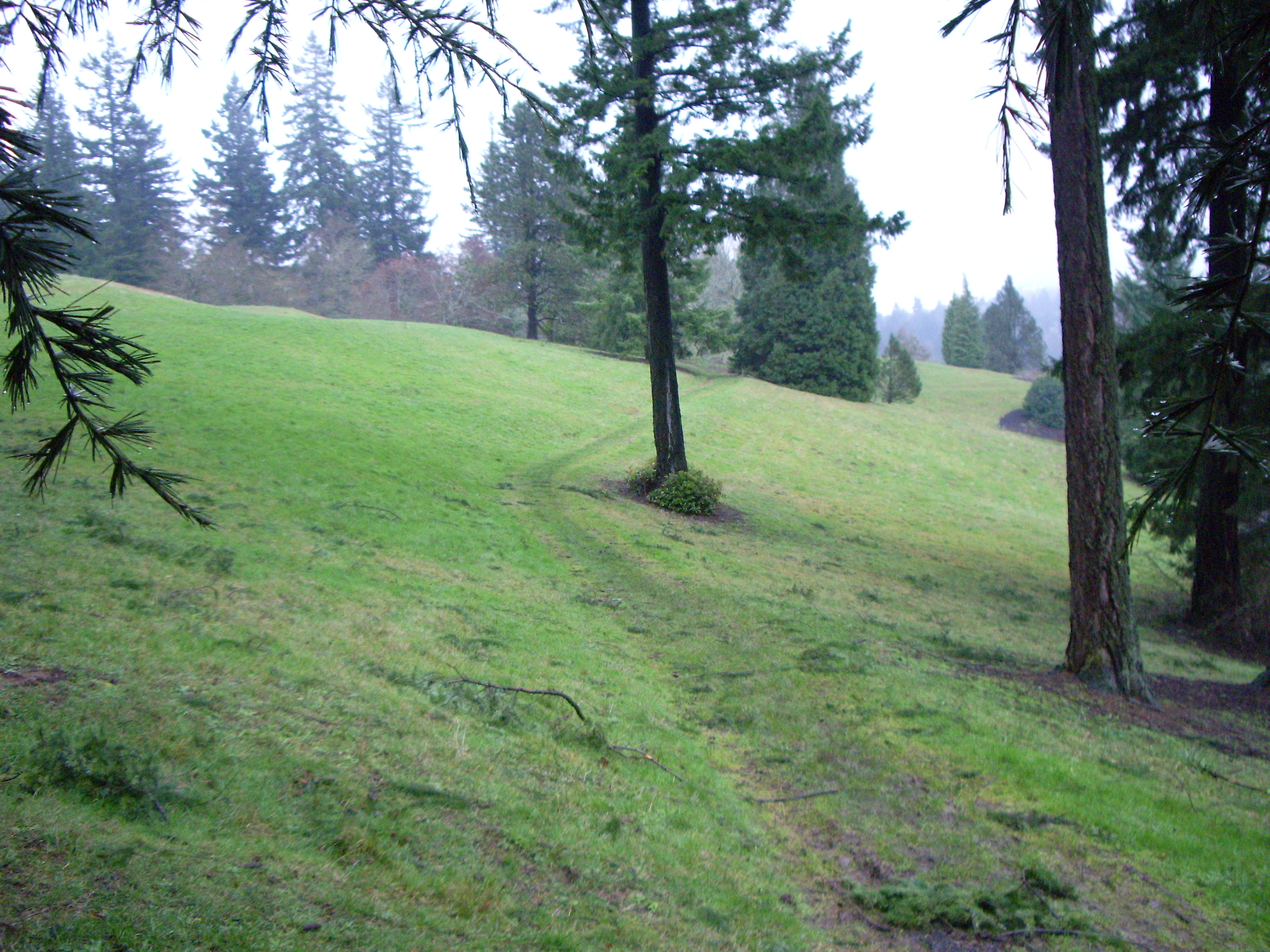
Washington Park (Portland, Oregon)

==== Pennsylvania ====
- George Washington (1815), by William Rush, now in Second Bank of the United States, Philadelphia
- Washington Square, Philadelphia. Set aside as a public park by William Penn in 1682, it was named for Washington in 1825.
- George Washington (1869), by Joseph A. Bailly, in front of Independence Hall, Philadelphia. This bronze replica was installed in 1910; the original marble is now in Philadelphia City Hall.
- George Washington Memorial (1891), by Edward Ludwig Albert Pausch, Allegheny Commons Park, Pittsburgh
- Washington Monument (1893), by Frank Carlucci, Lackawanna County Courthouse, Scranton
- Washington Monument (1897), by Rudolf Siemering. Relocated in 1926 to Eakins Oval in front of the Philadelphia Museum of Art.
- Washington Memorial Chapel (1903–17), Milton B. Medary architect, Valley Forge National Park, Valley Forge
  - Valley Forge (Seated Washington) (1879), by Franklin Simmons. A bronze statuette in the chancel.
  - George Washington Window, by Nicola D'Ascenzo. A stained glass window depicting 36 scenes from Washington's life.
  - National Patriots Bell Tower (1950–53), Zantzinger & Borie, architects. Houses the 58-bell Washington Memorial National Carillon.
  - George Washington by C. Paul Jennewein (1953), on exterior of the National Patriots Bell Tower
- Copy (1910) after George Washington by Jean-Antoine Houdon (1785–91), Jefferson Memorial Park, Pittsburgh
- Washington Crossing Monument (1916), unknown sculptor, Washington Crossing Historic Park, Washington Crossing
- George Washington (1921–22), by C. S. Kilpatrick, Fort Leboeuf Museum, Waterford
- Copy (1922) after George Washington by Jean-Antoine Houdon (1791), Tomb of the Unknown Revolutionary War Soldier (1956), Washington Square, Philadelphia
- Copy (1931) after George Washington by Jean-Antoine Houdon (1791), Washington's HeadquartersValley Forge National Park
- George Washington Kneeling in Prayer (1967), by Donald De Lue, Freedoms Foundation, Valley Forge
- Washington Crossing the Delaware (1974–76), by Frank Arena, Washington Crossing. A near-lifesize sculpture group based on Emanuel Leutze's 1851 painting.
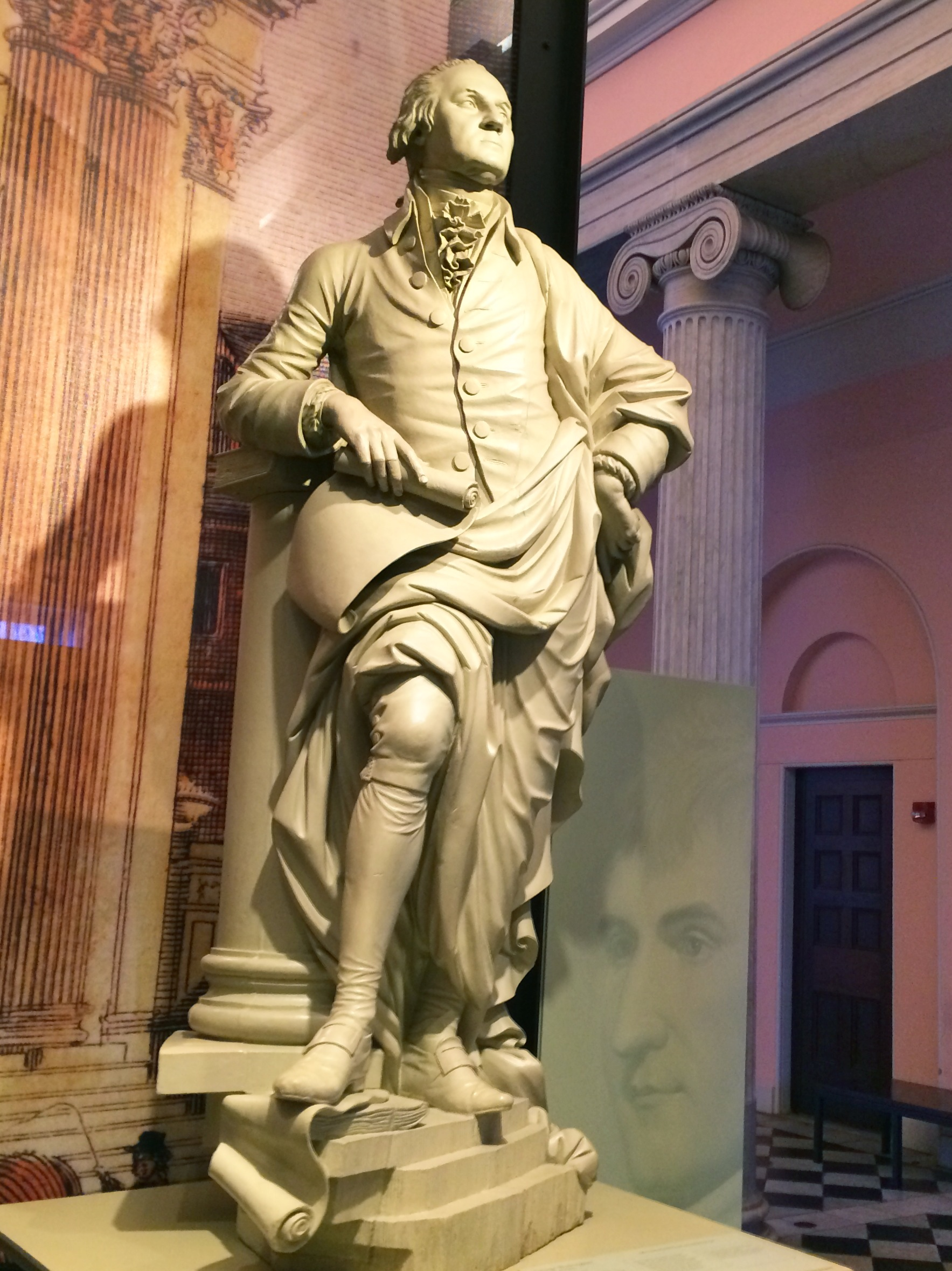
George Washington (1815), by William Rush, Second Bank of the United States, Philadelphia

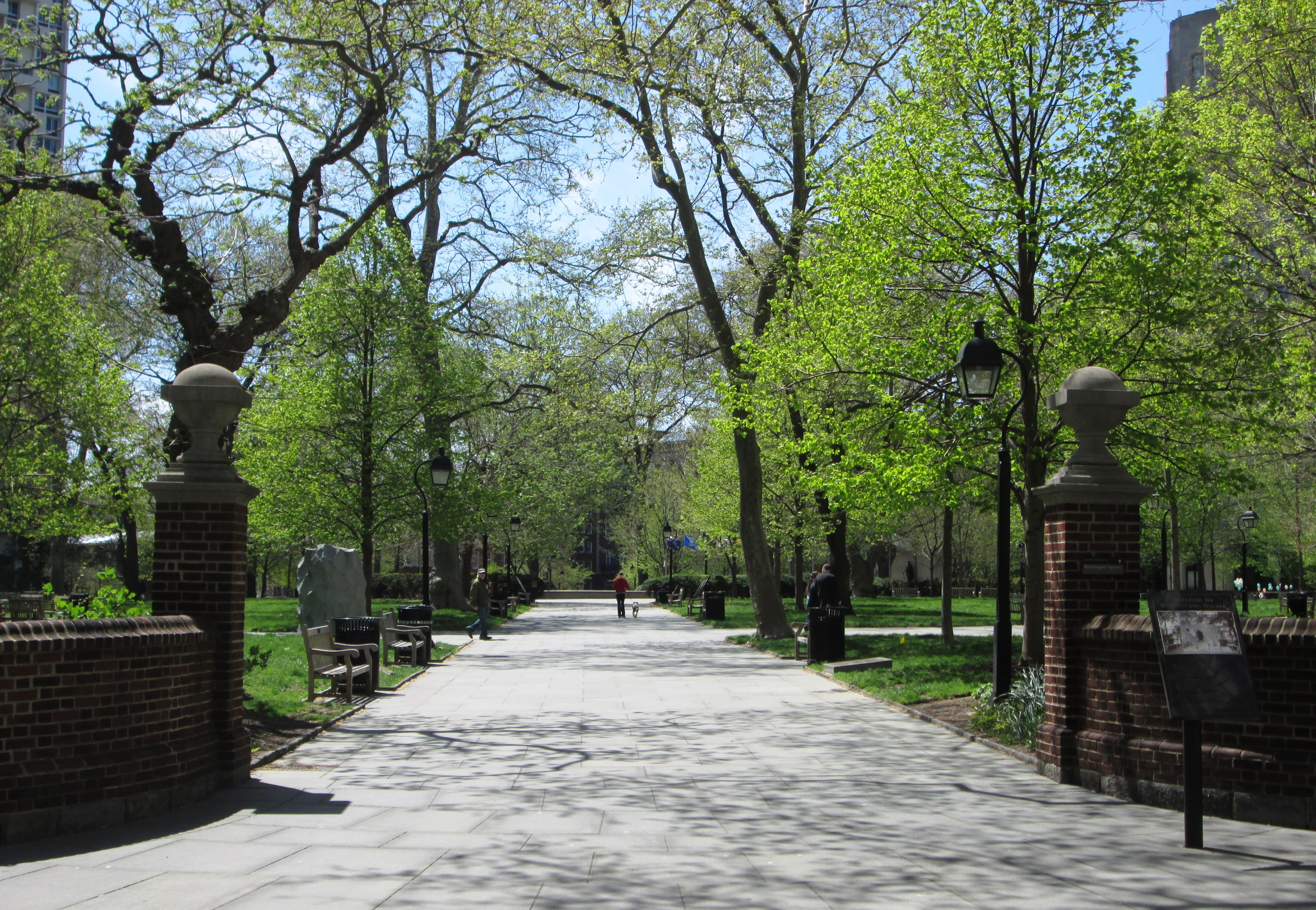
Washington Square (1825), Philadelphia

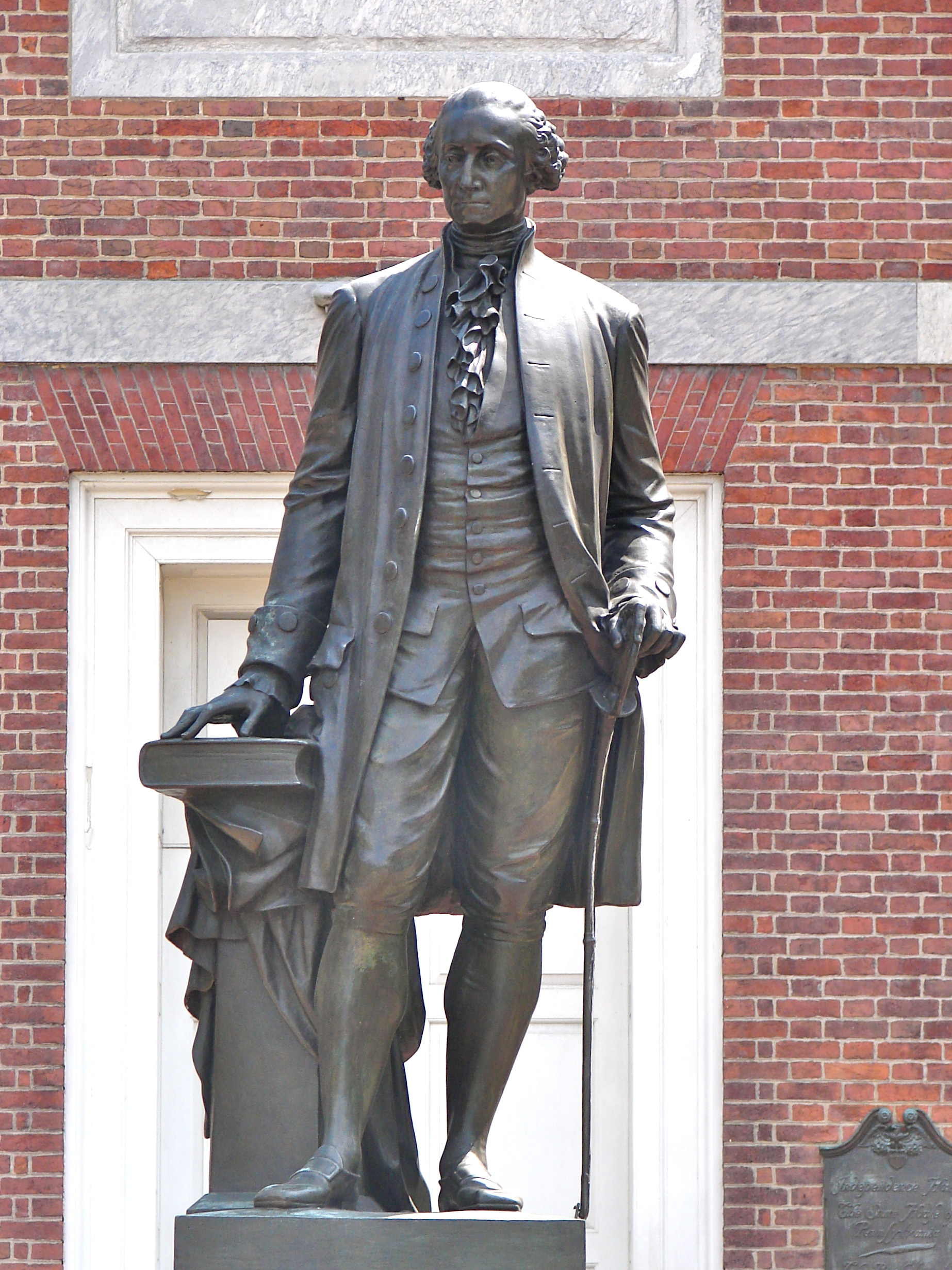
George Washington (1869, bronze replica 1910), by Joseph A. Bailly, Independence Hall, Philadelphia

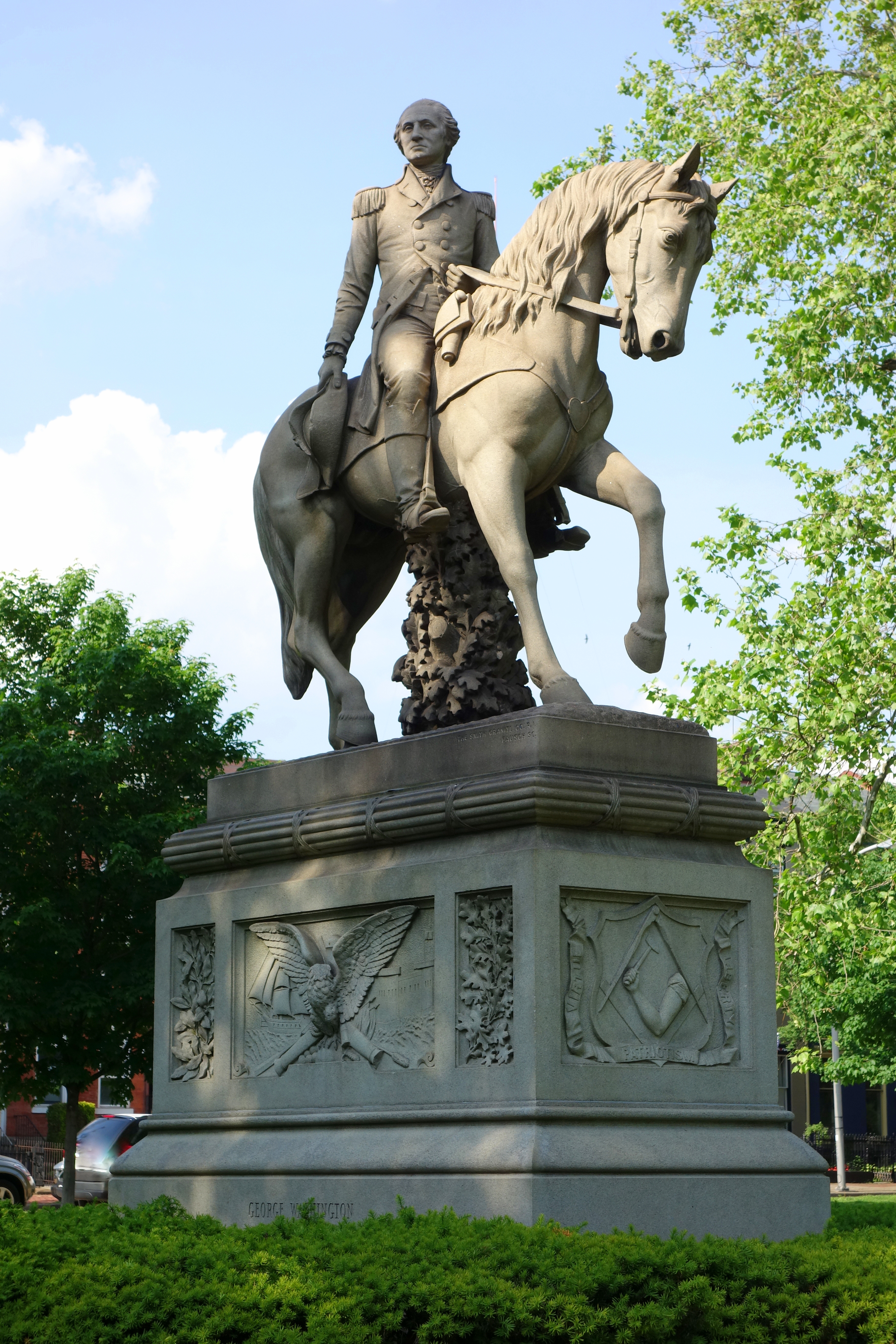
George Washington Memorial (1891), by Edward Ludwig Albert Pausch, Allegheny Commons Park, Pittsburgh

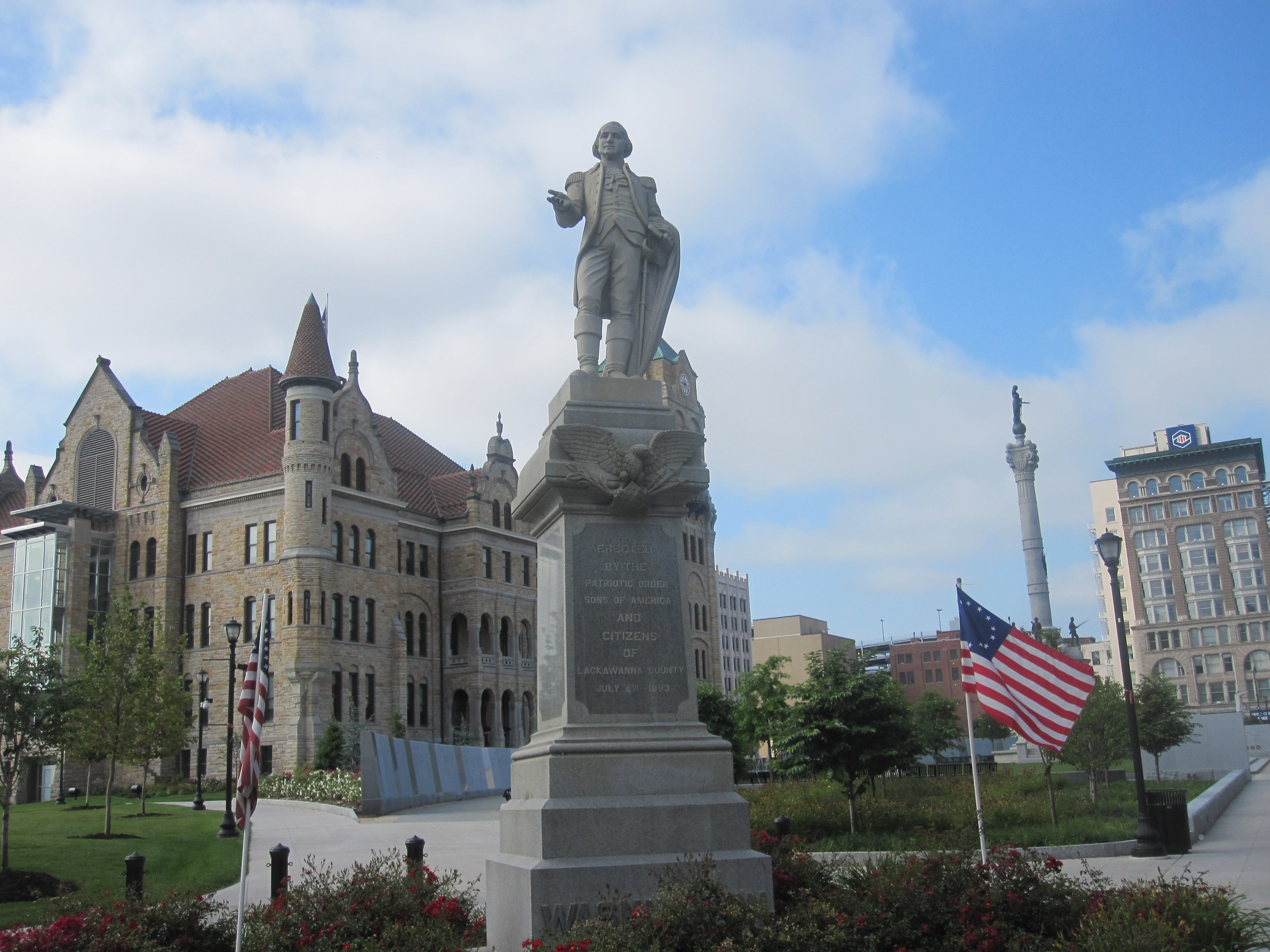
Washington Monument (1893), by Frank Carlucci, Scranton

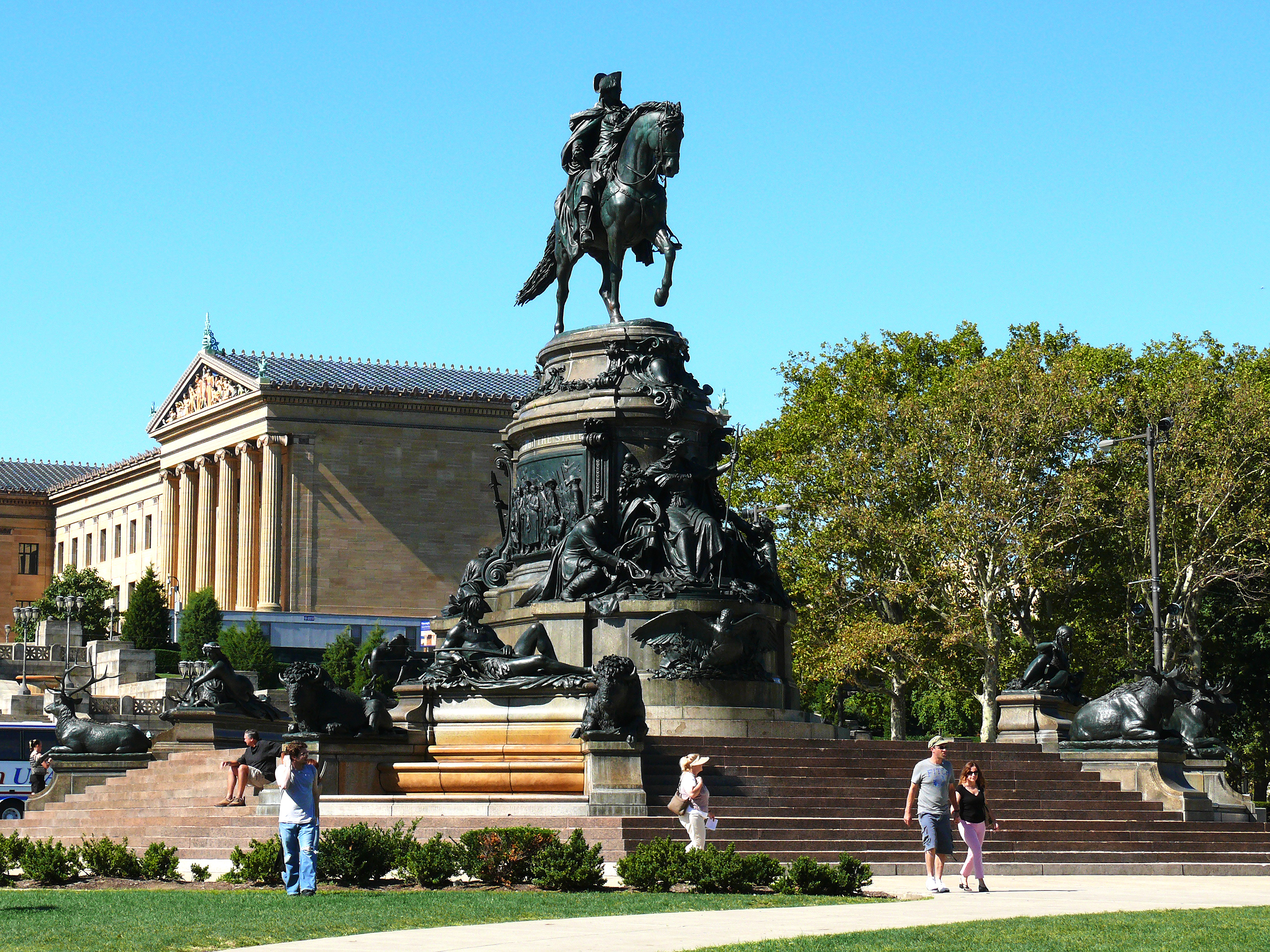
Washington Monument (1897), by Rudolf Siemering, Philadelphia

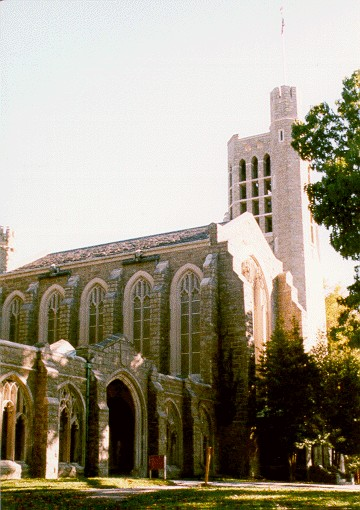
Washington Memorial Chapel (1903–17), Valley Forge

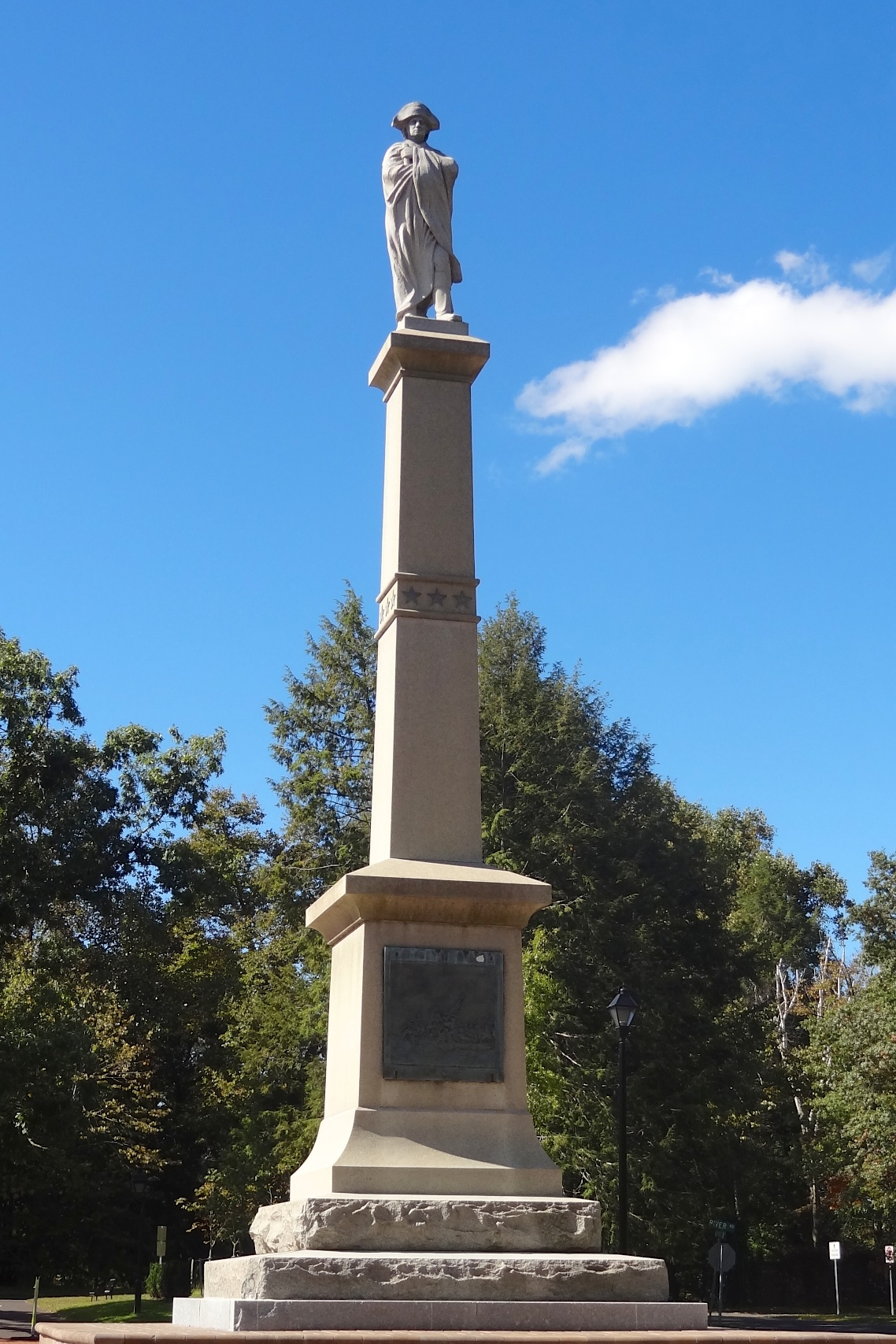
Washington Crossing Monument (1916), Washington Crossing

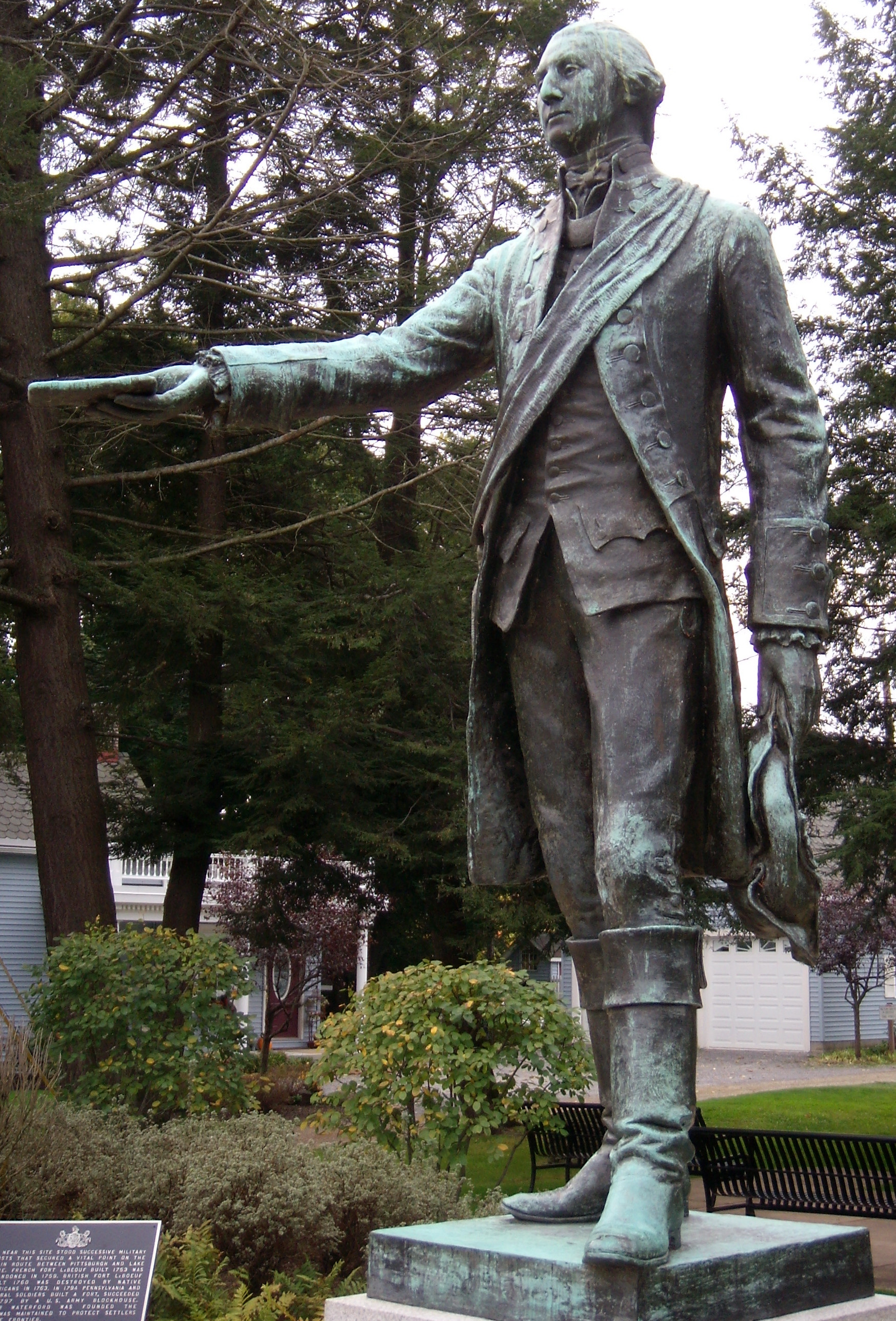
George Washington (1921–22), by C. S. Kilpatrick, Waterford

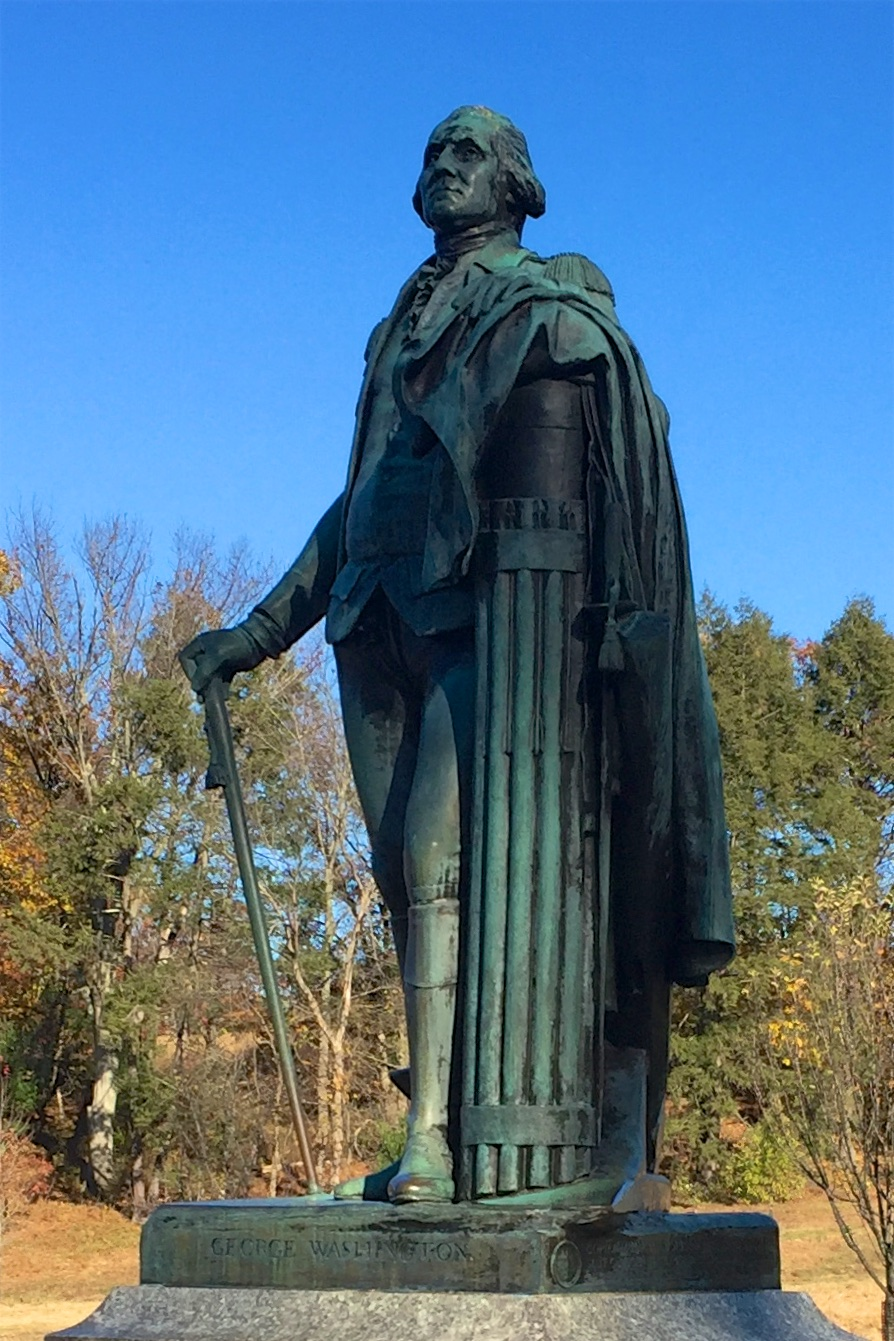
George Washington (1931) after Jean-Antoine Houdon (1791), Valley Forge National Park

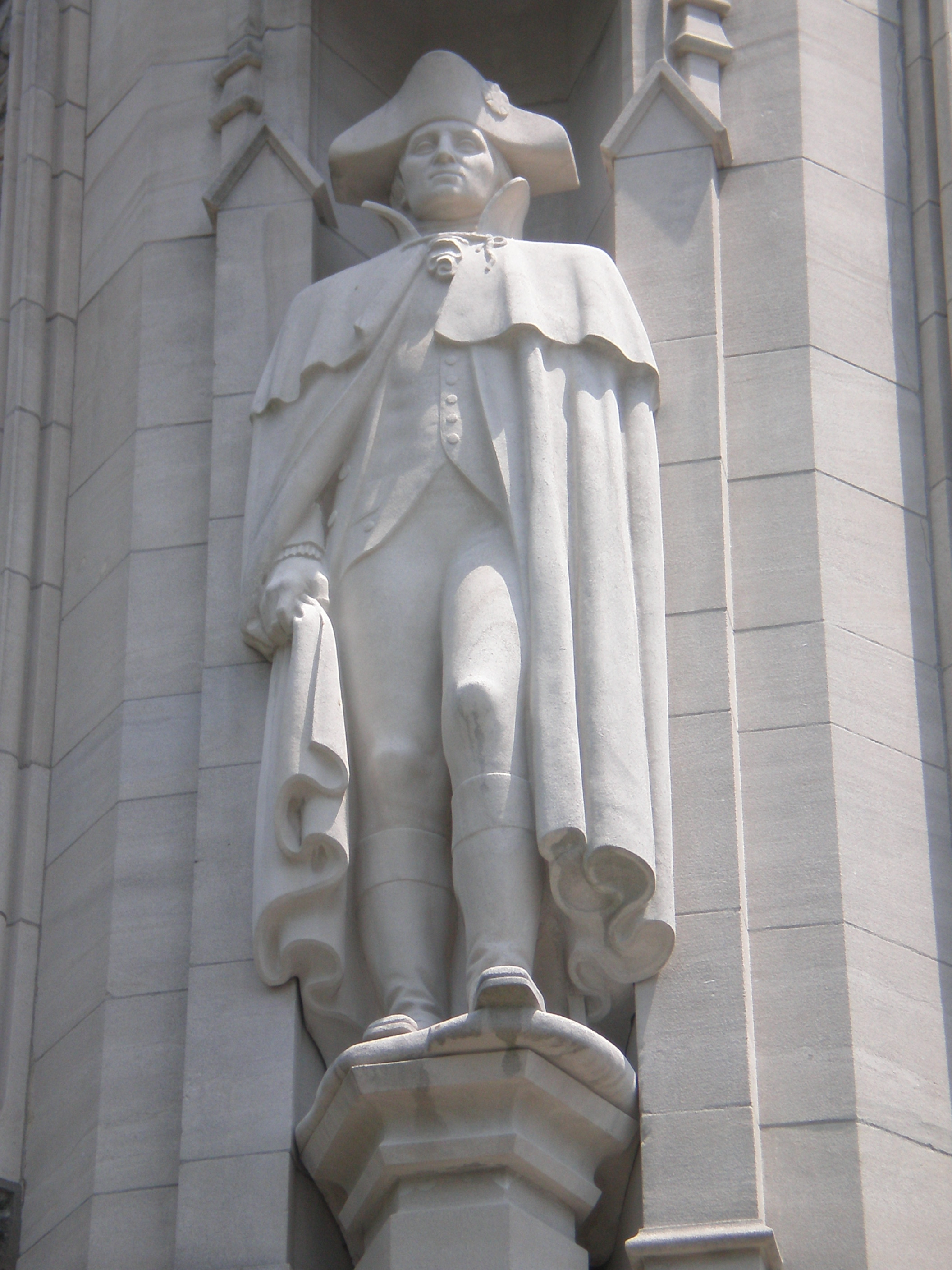
George Washington (1953), by C. Paul Jennewein, Washington Memorial Chapel, Valley Forge

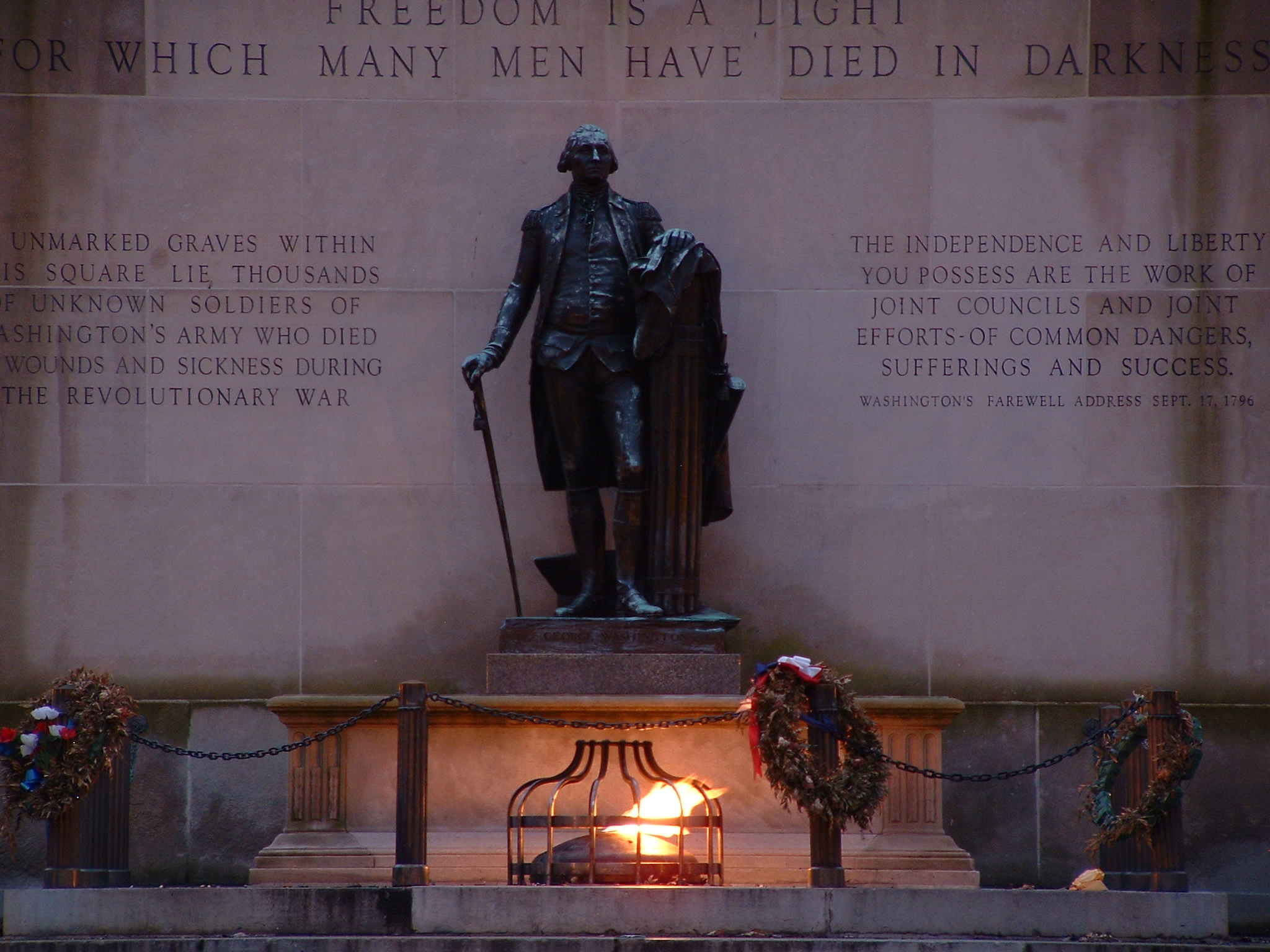
Tomb of the Unknown Revolutionary War Soldier (1956), Washington Square, Philadelphia

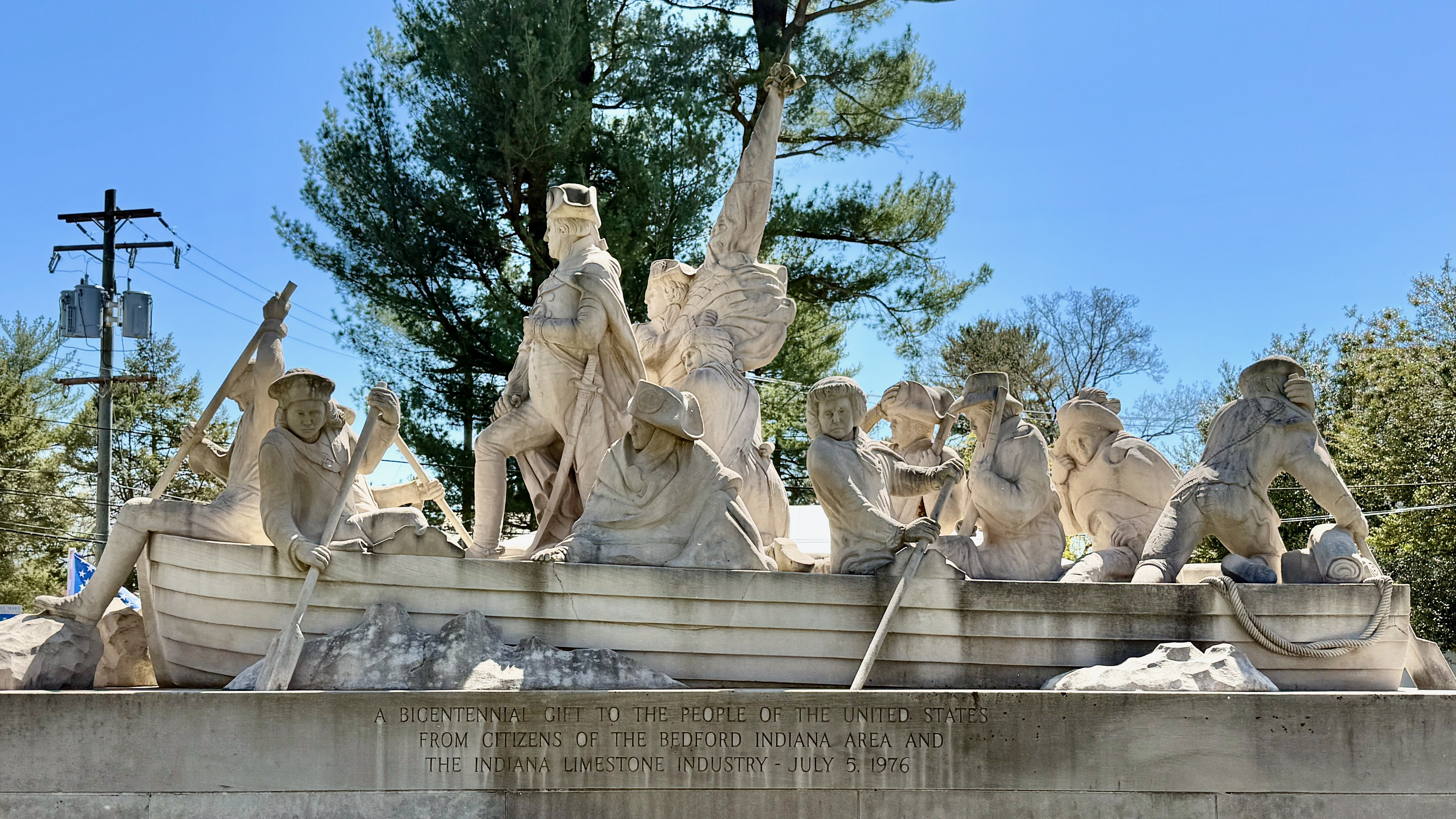
Washington Crossing the Delaware (1974–76), by Frank Arena, Washington Crossing

==== Rhode Island ====
- Half-size copy after George Washington by Jean-Antoine Houdon (1791), Redwood Library and Athenaeum, Newport

==== South Carolina ====
- Copy after George Washington by Jean-Antoine Houdon (1791), South Carolina Statehouse, Columbia

==== South Dakota ====
- George Washington (1999–2000), by Lee Leuning, Rapid City
- Mount Rushmore (1924–1941), by Gutzon Borglum; along with Thomas Jefferson, Theodore Roosevelt and Abraham Lincoln
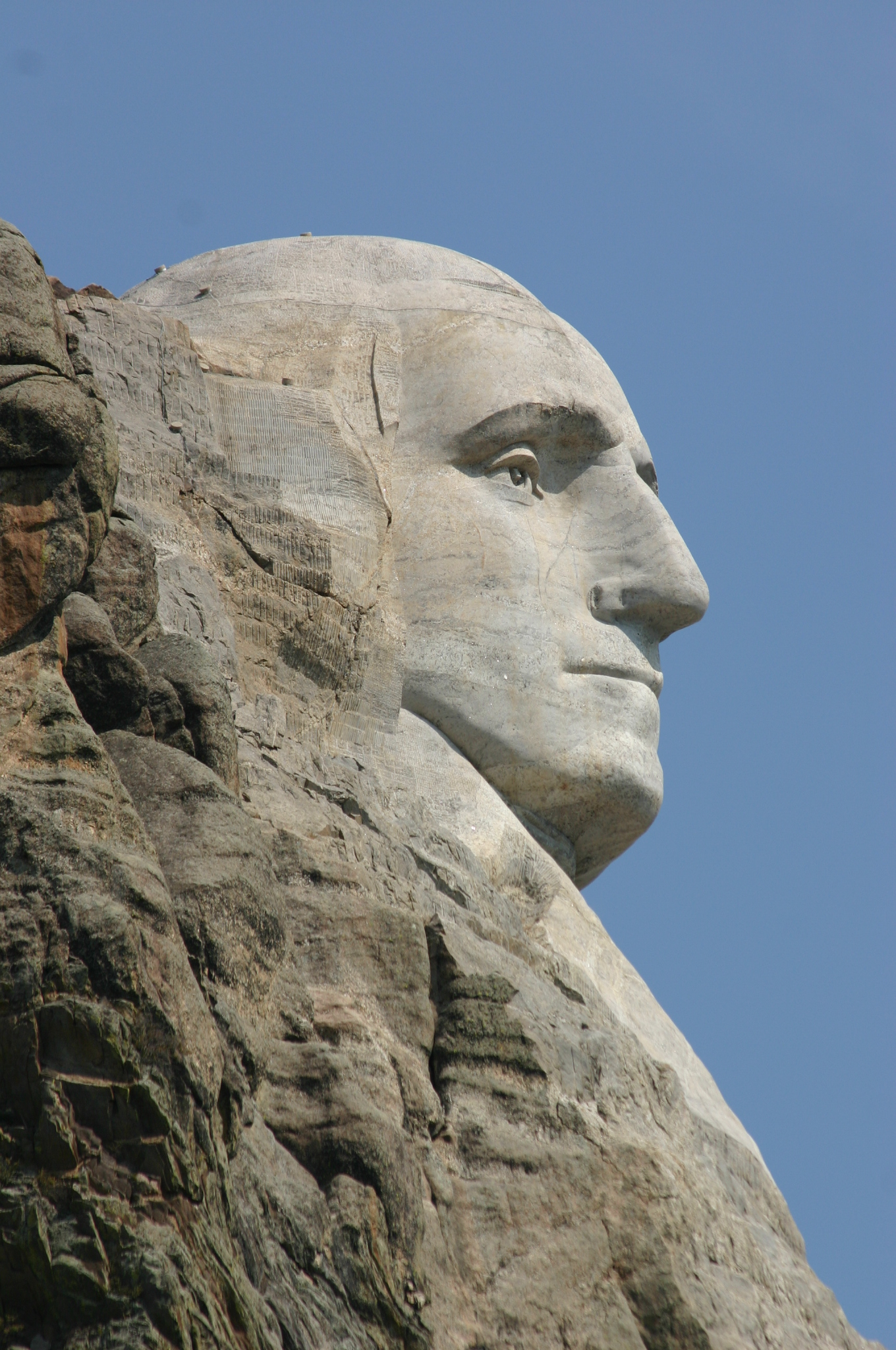
"Washington" on Mount Rushmore

==== Texas ====
- George Washington (1955), by Pompeo Coppini, in front of Main Building, University of Texas at Austin
- Washington's Birthday Celebration Building, Laredo
- George Washington (1990), by Roberto Garcia, Jr., City Hall, Laredo.
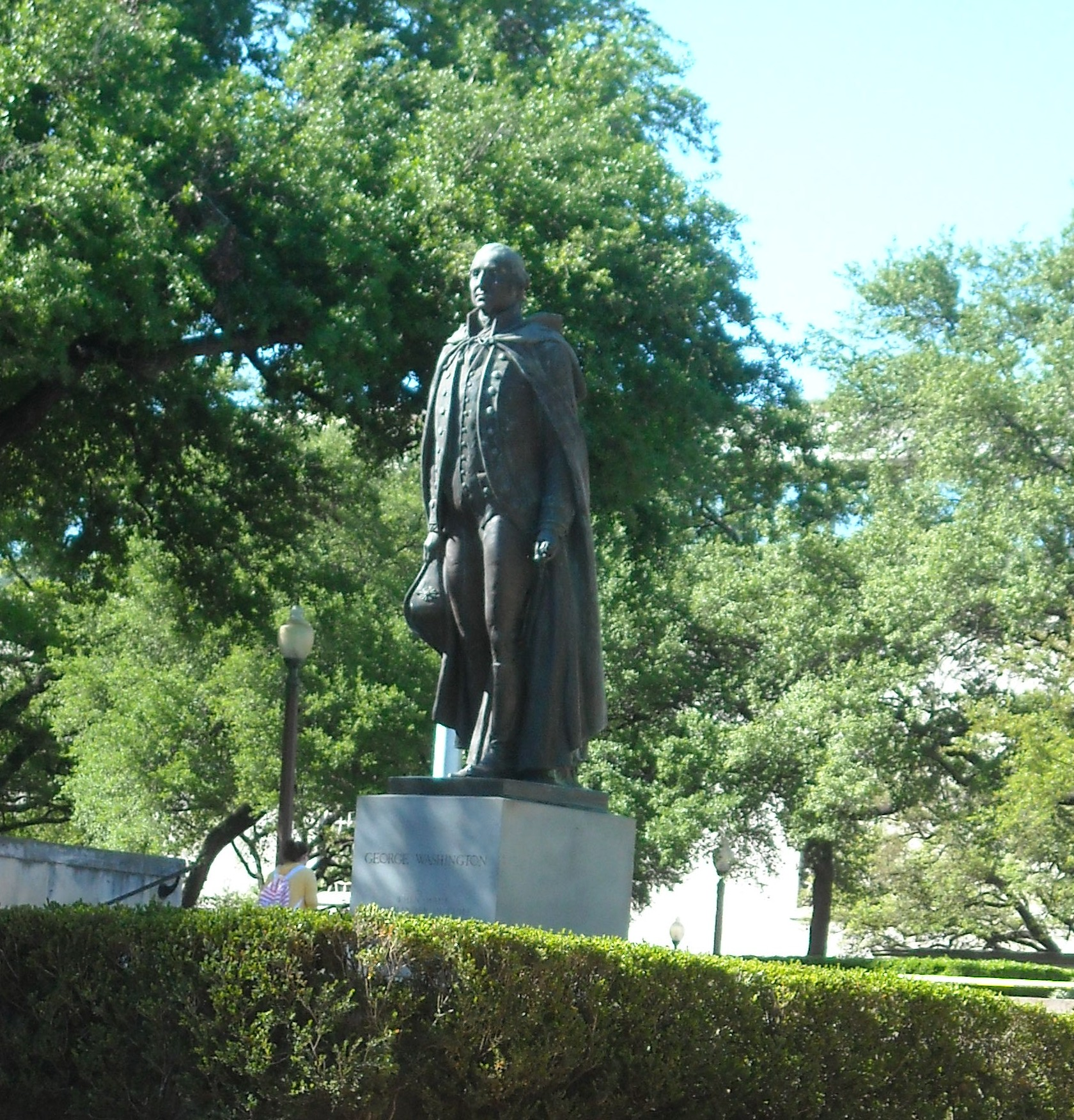
George Washington (1955), by Pompeo Coppini, University of Texas at Austin

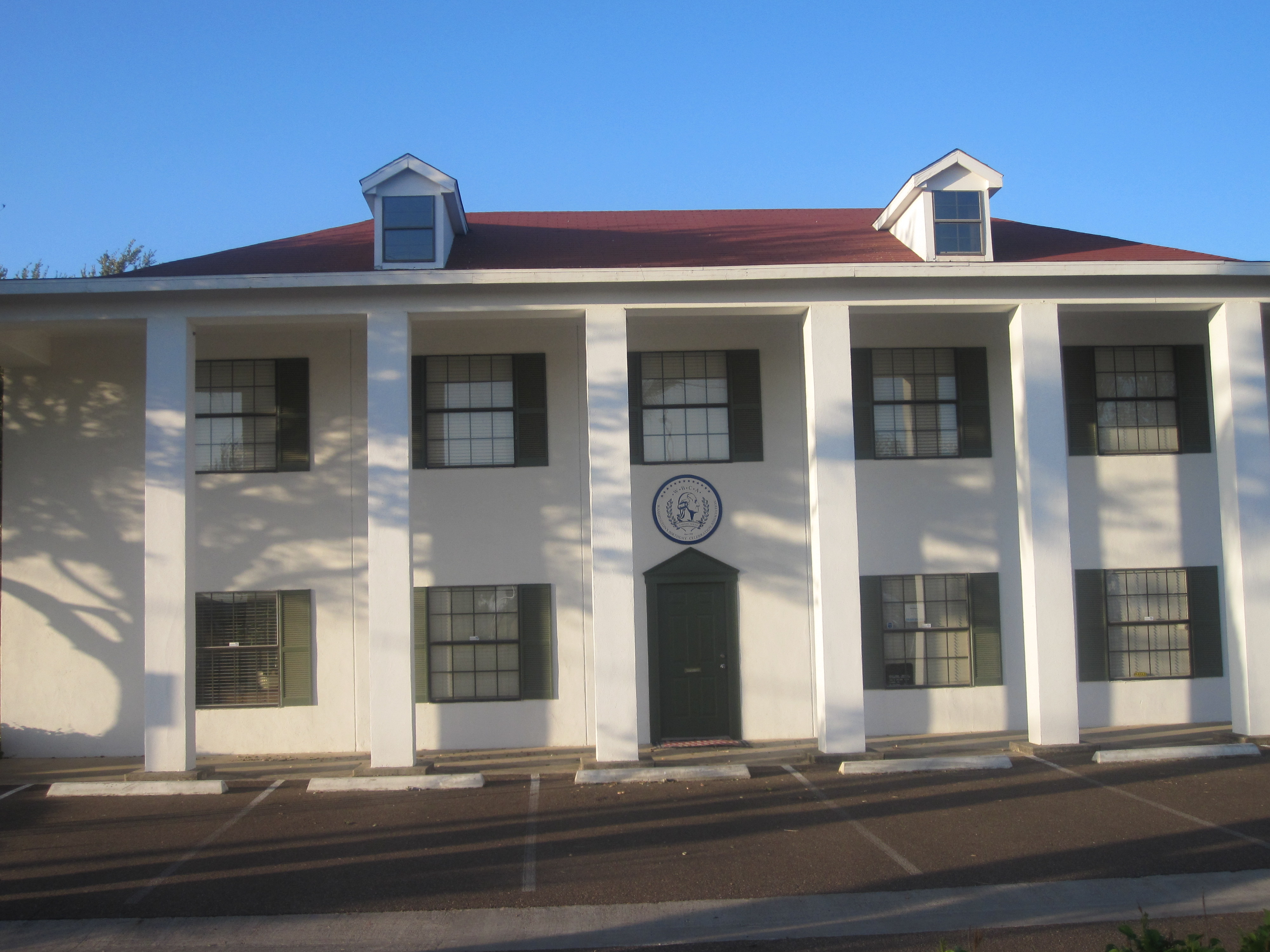
Washington's Birthday Celebration Building, Laredo

==== Utah ====
- Washington Square, Salt Lake City. Site of the first Utah Statehouse (1896–1916).
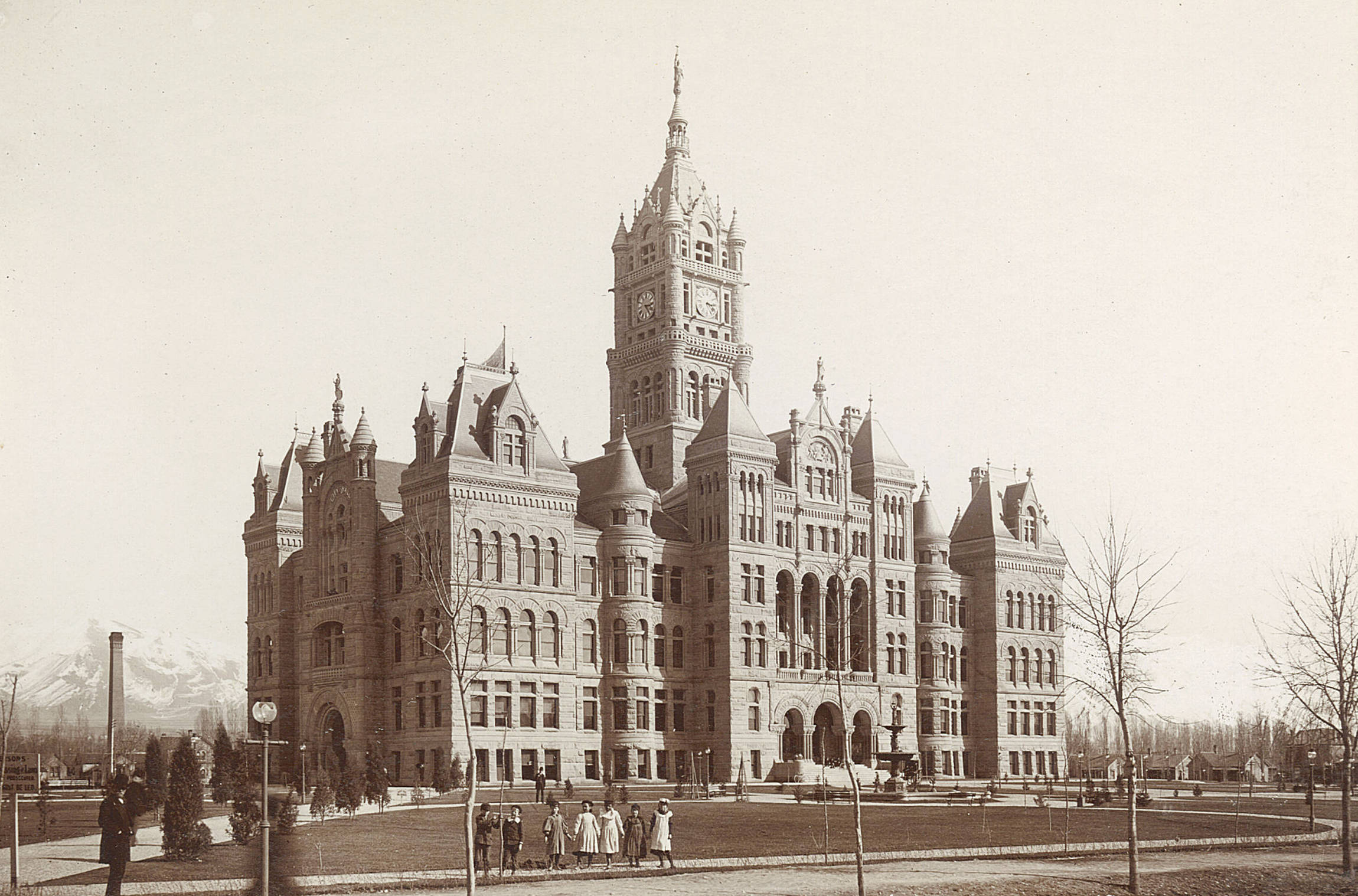
Utah's first statehouse

==== Virginia ====
- George Washington (1785–1791), by Jean-Antoine Houdon, Virginia State Capitol, Richmond
- George Washington (1844), Old George, by Matthew Kahle, atop Washington Hall at Washington and Lee University, Lexington
- Copy (1856) cast by William James Hubard after George Washington by Jean-Antoine Houdon (1791), Virginia Military Institute, Lexington
- Washington Monument (1849–1857), by Thomas Crawford, Capitol Square, Richmond
- George Washington Masonic National Memorial (1923–1932), Harvey Wiley Corbett, architect, Alexandria:
  - Illustrious Brother George Washington, 1949, by Bryant Baker
  - Mural of George Washington Laying the Cornerstone of the United States Capitol (1952–1955), by Allyn Cox
  - George Washington as Master Mason (1959, this cast 1966), by Donald De Lue
- Gen. George Washington, by Cyd Player, Historic Yorktown (Riverwalk Landing)
- George Washington Memorial Parkway, authorized by Congress 1930, first section opened 1932
- George Washington National Forest, western Virginia and eastern West Virginia. Established as Shenandoah National Forest (1918). Name changed to honor George Washington (1932). Natural Bridge National Forest added (1933).
- Copy of George Washington by Jean-Antoine Houdon (1791), University of Virginia, Charlottesville
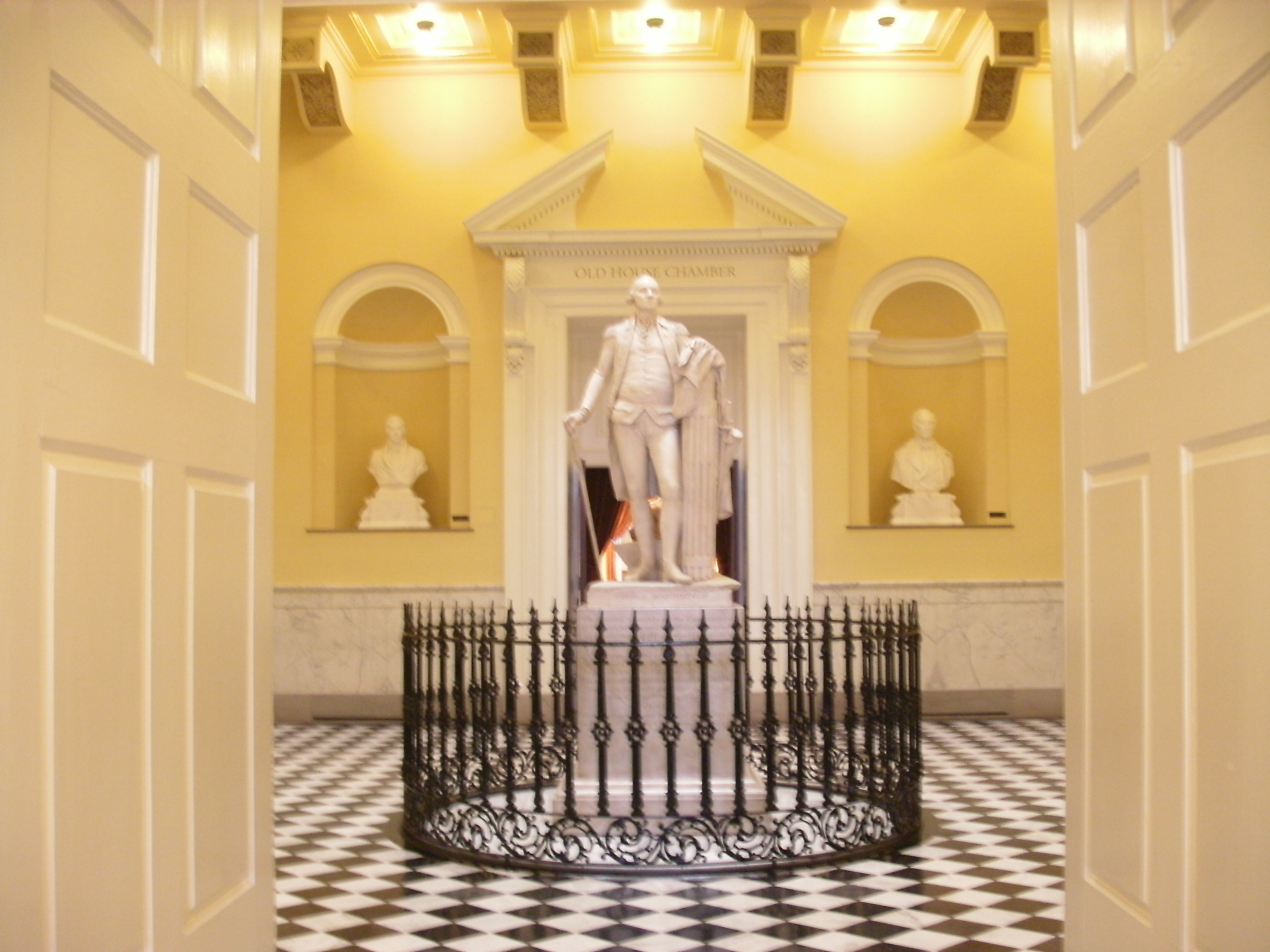
George Washington (1785–1791), by Jean-Antoine Houdon, Virginia State Capitol, Richmond

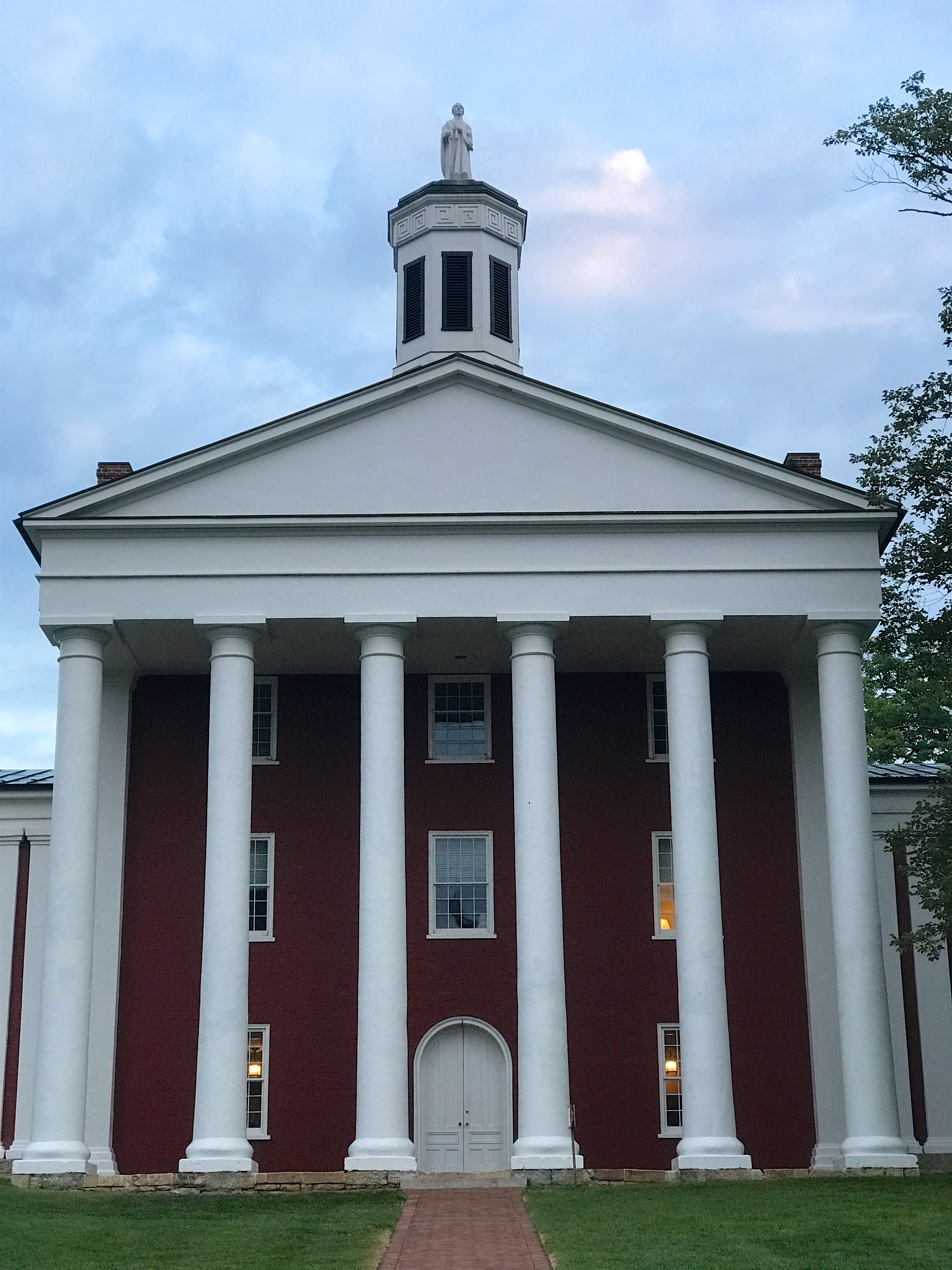
Old George (1844) by Matthew Kahle, atop Washington Hall at Washington and Lee University, Lexington

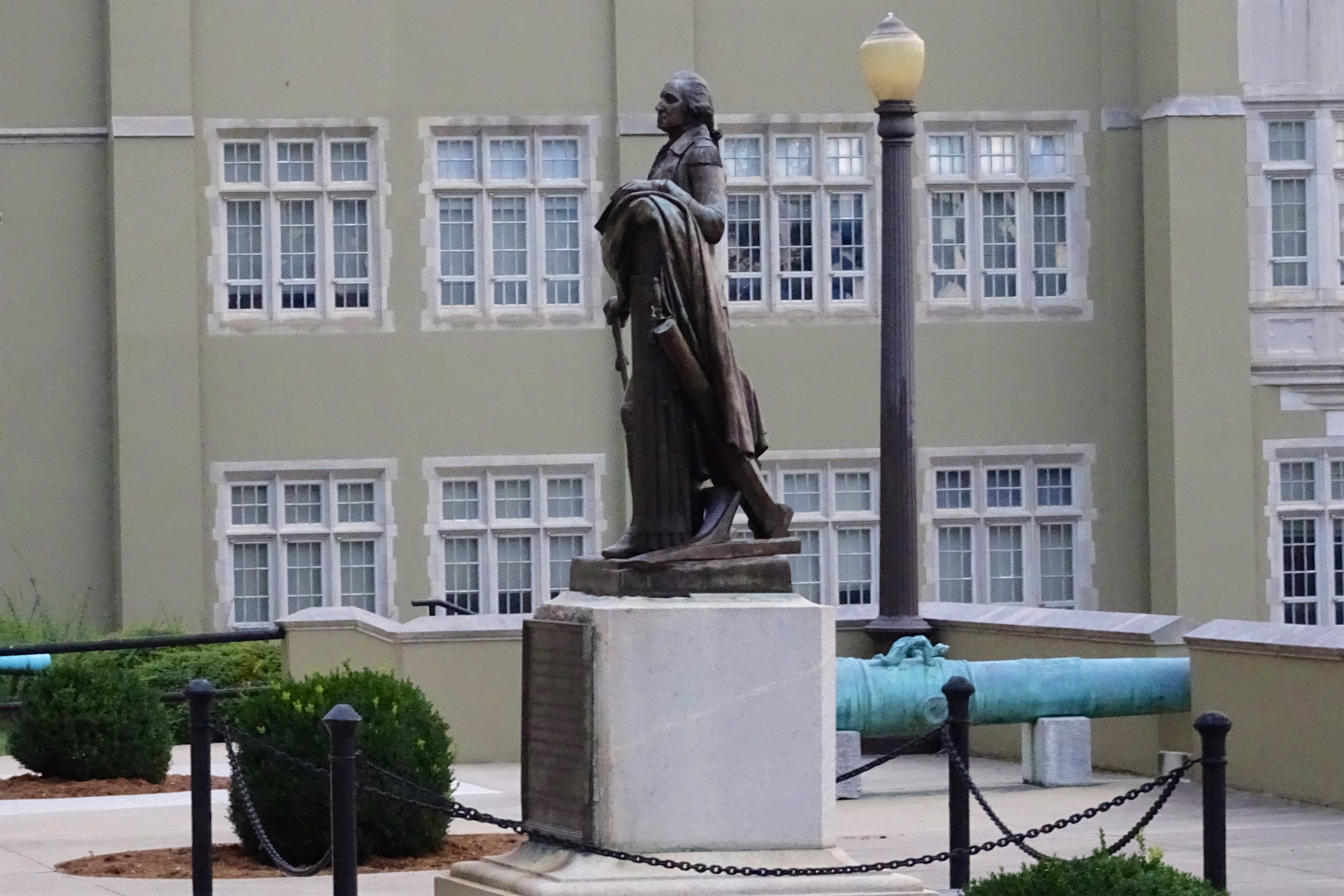
George Washington, cast by William James Hubard (1856) after Jean-Antoine Houdon (1791), Virginia Military Institute, Lexington

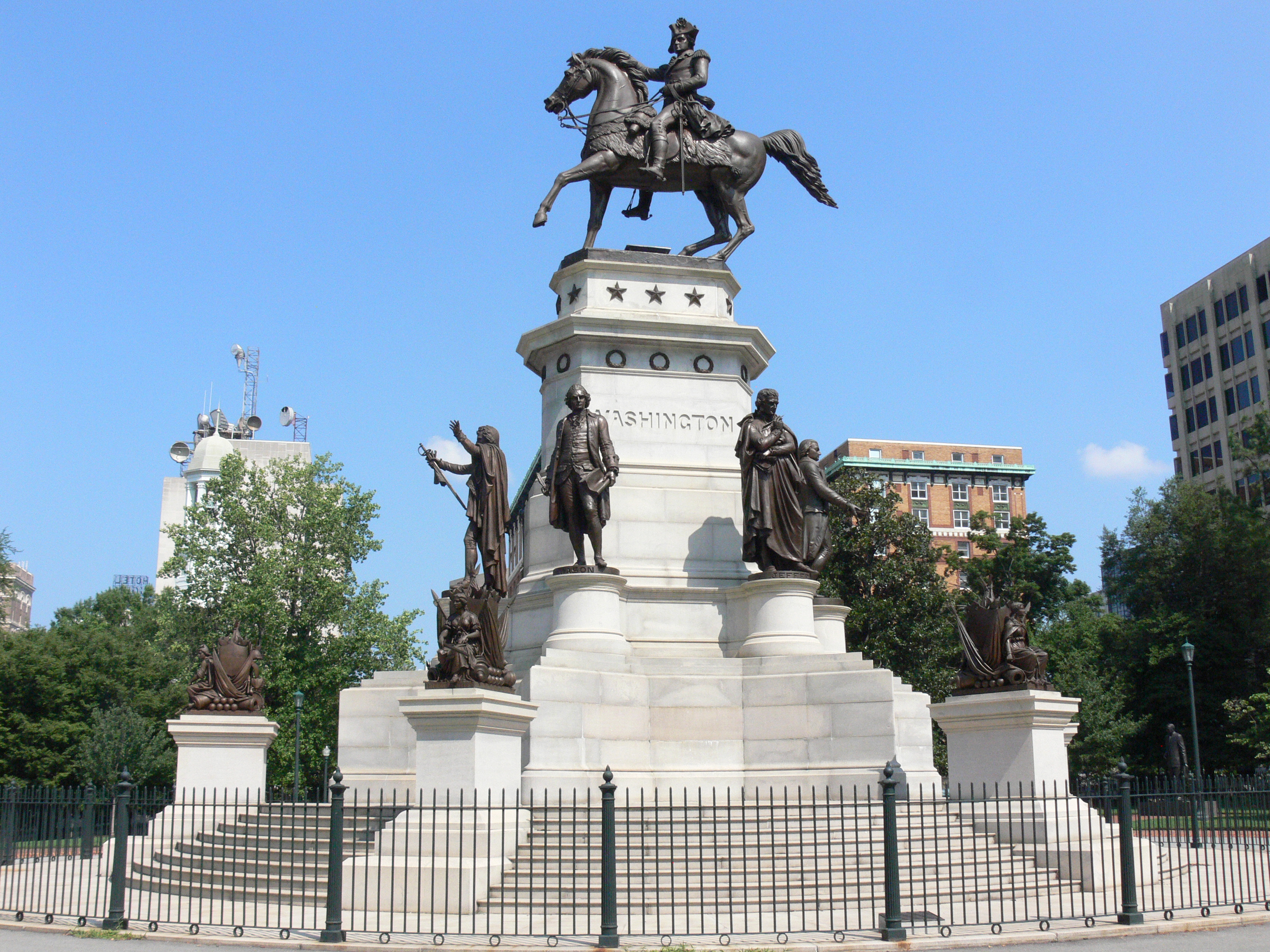
Washington Monument (1849–1857), by Thomas Crawford, Richmond

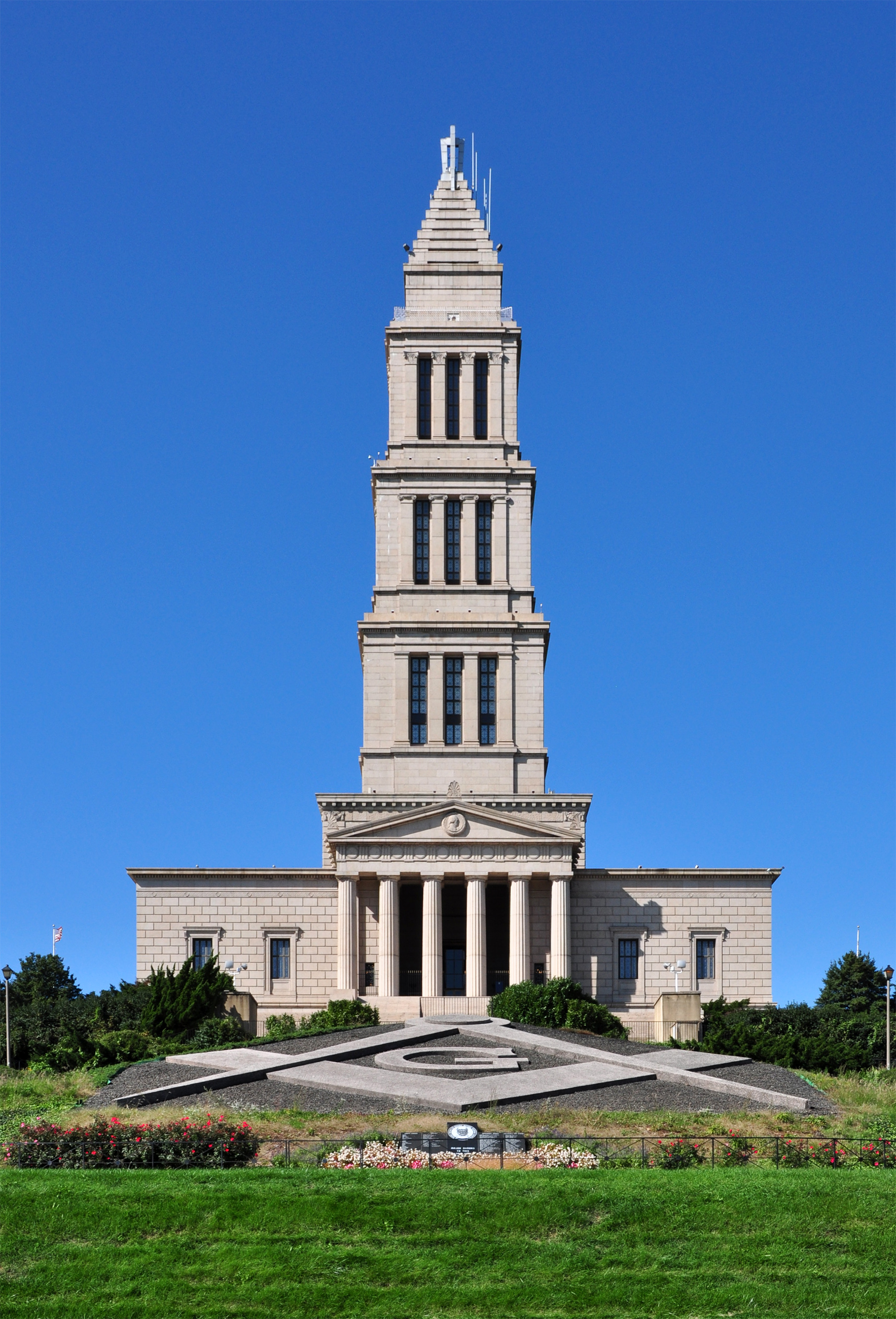
George Washington Masonic National Memorial (1923–1932), Alexandria

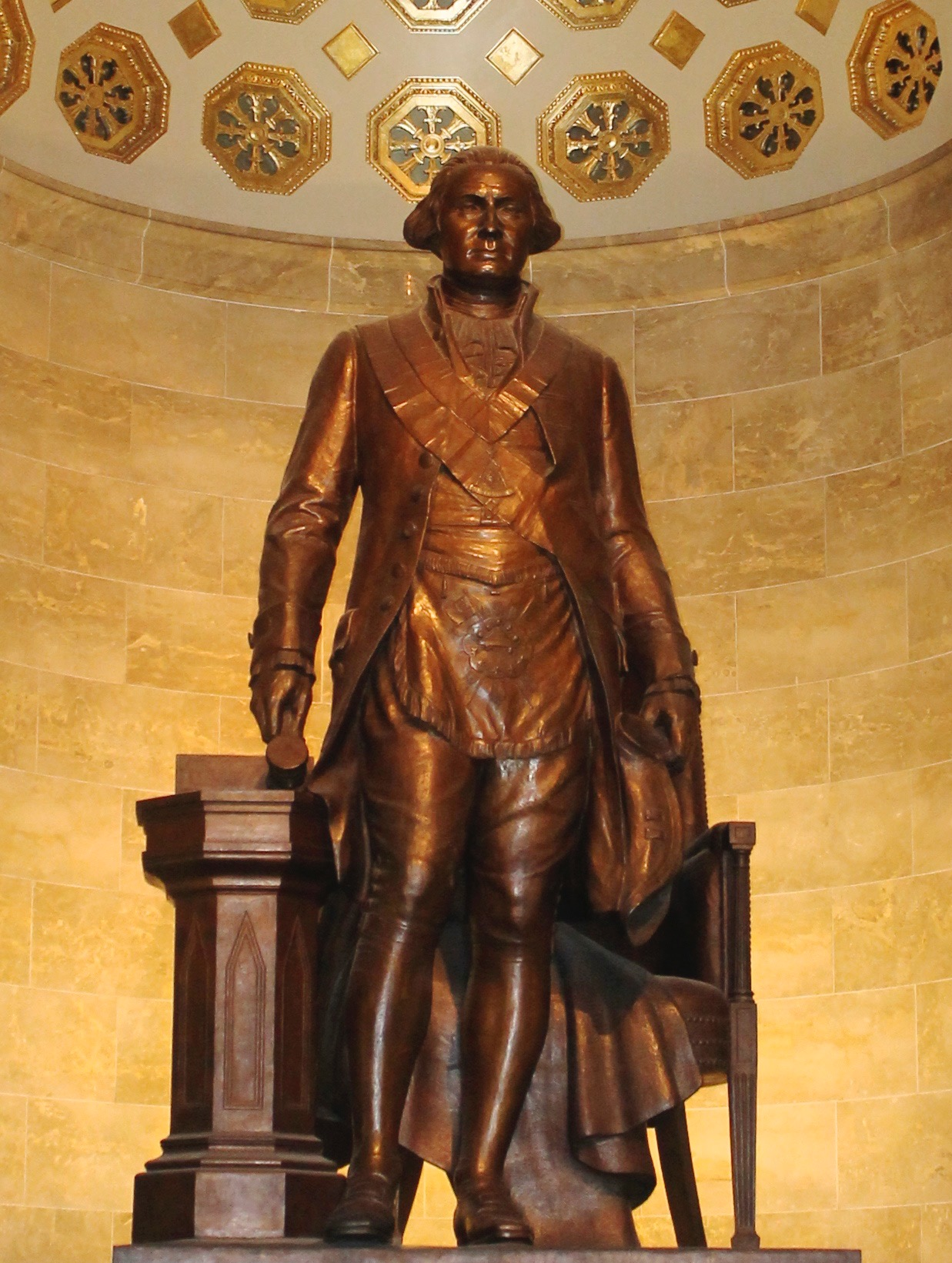
Illustrious Brother George Washington, Alexandria, Virginia, 1949, by Bryant Baker, George Washington Masonic National Memorial

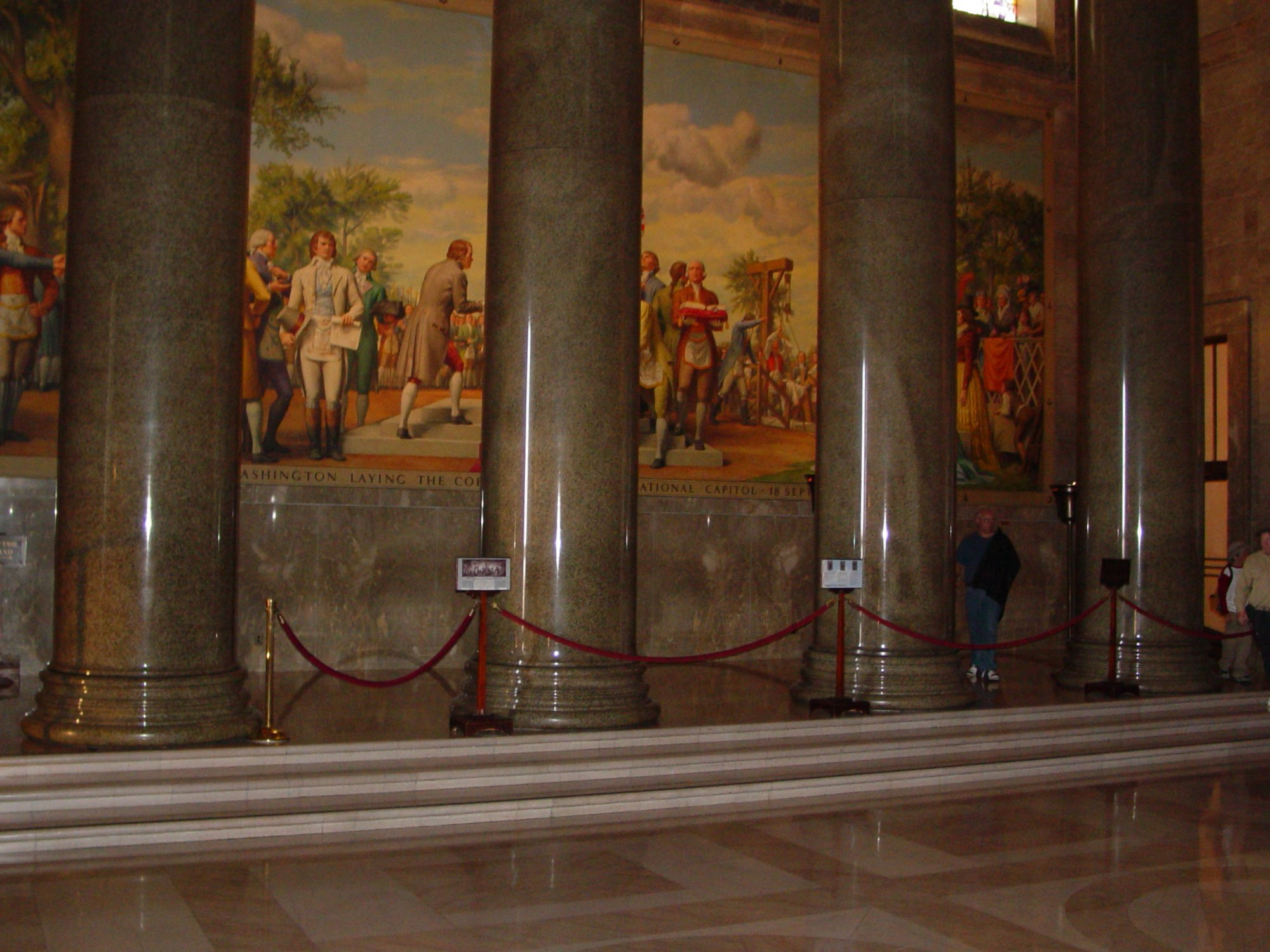
Washington Laying the Cornerstone (1952–1955), by Allyn Cox, George Washington Masonic National Memorial

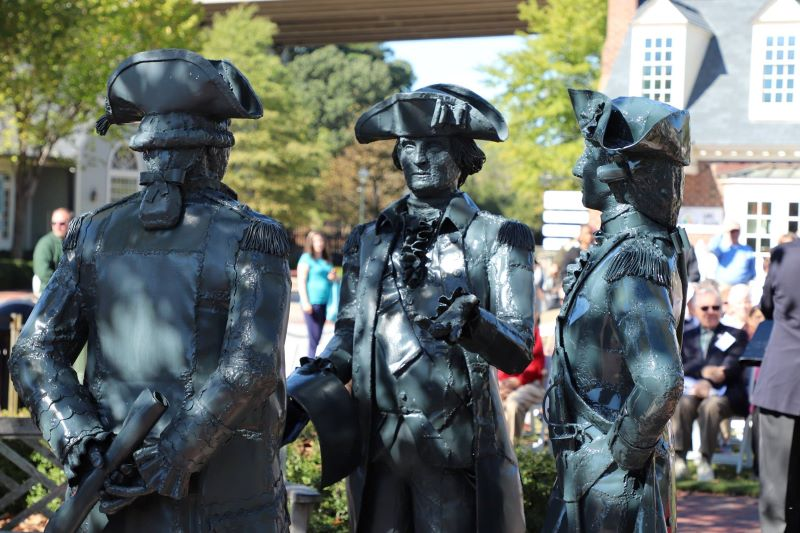
General Washington, Admiral de Grasse, and the Marquis de Lafayette - three leading figures in the Yorktown Campaign. The display is celebrated as a symbol of America's first and oldest ally—France. Yorktown, VA

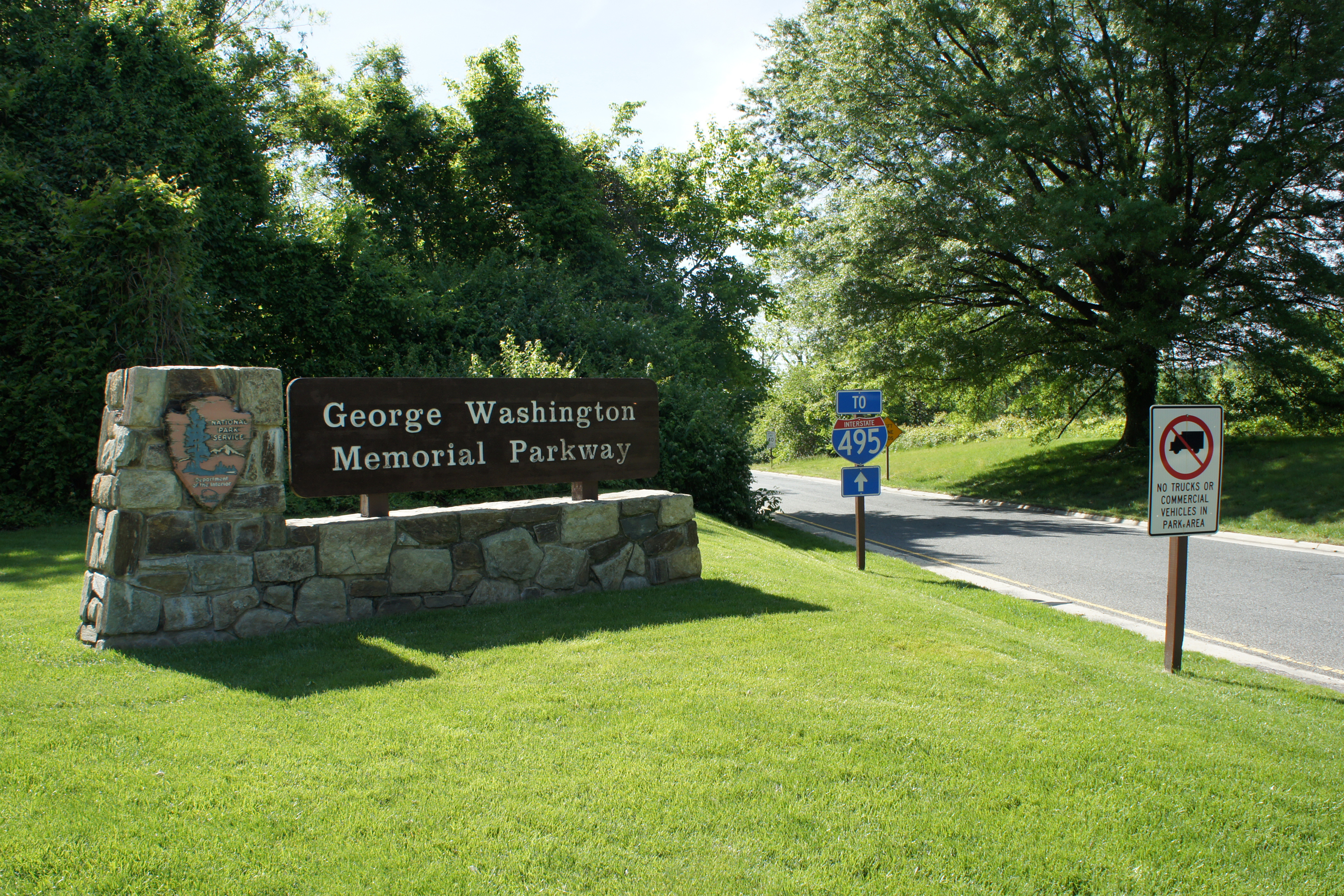
George Washington Memorial Parkway (1930–32)

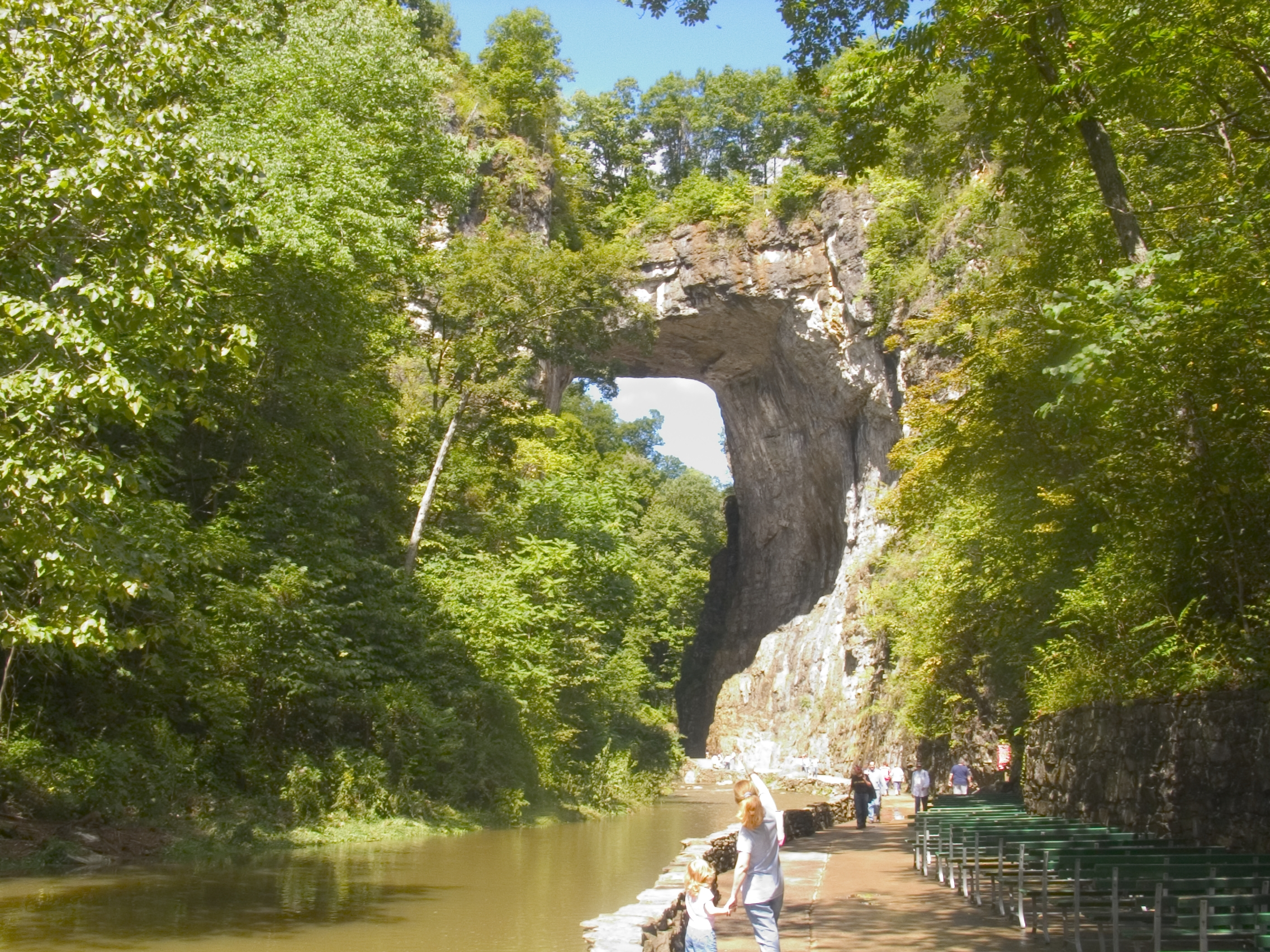
Natural Bridge, George Washington National Forest

==== Washington (state) ====
- George, Washington, Grant County, a city in Eastern Washington
- Lake Washington, King County, east of Seattle
- Mount Washington, Cascade Mountains, King County
- Mount Washington, Olympic Mountains, Mason County
- Seattle George Monument, (1989), by Buster Simpson, Seattle
- Statue of George Washington (1909), by Lorado Taft, University of Washington, Seattle
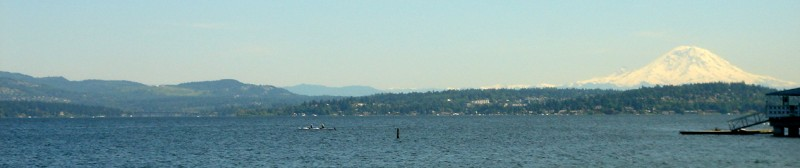
Lake Washington and Mount Rainier

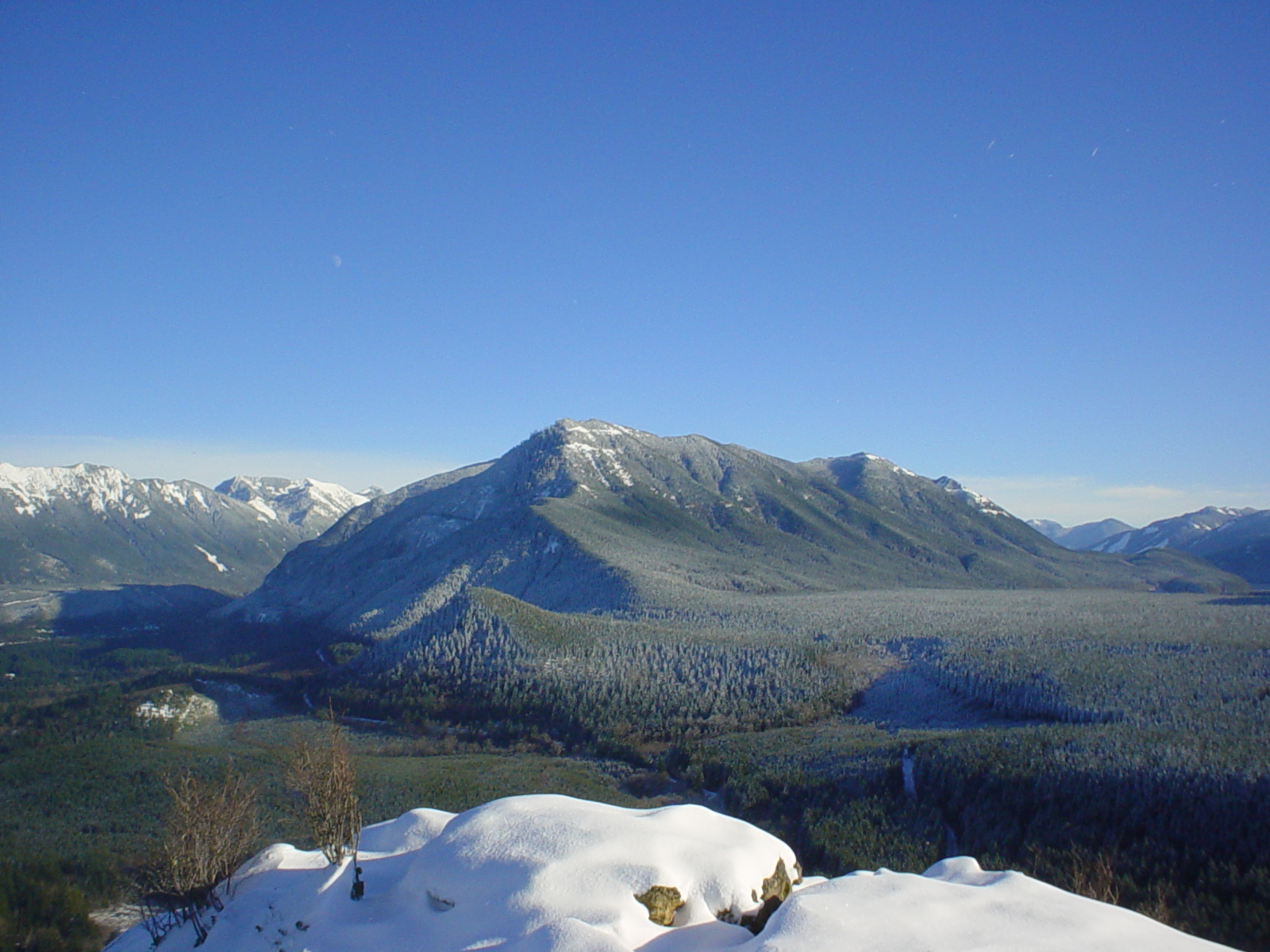
Mount Washington (Cascades)

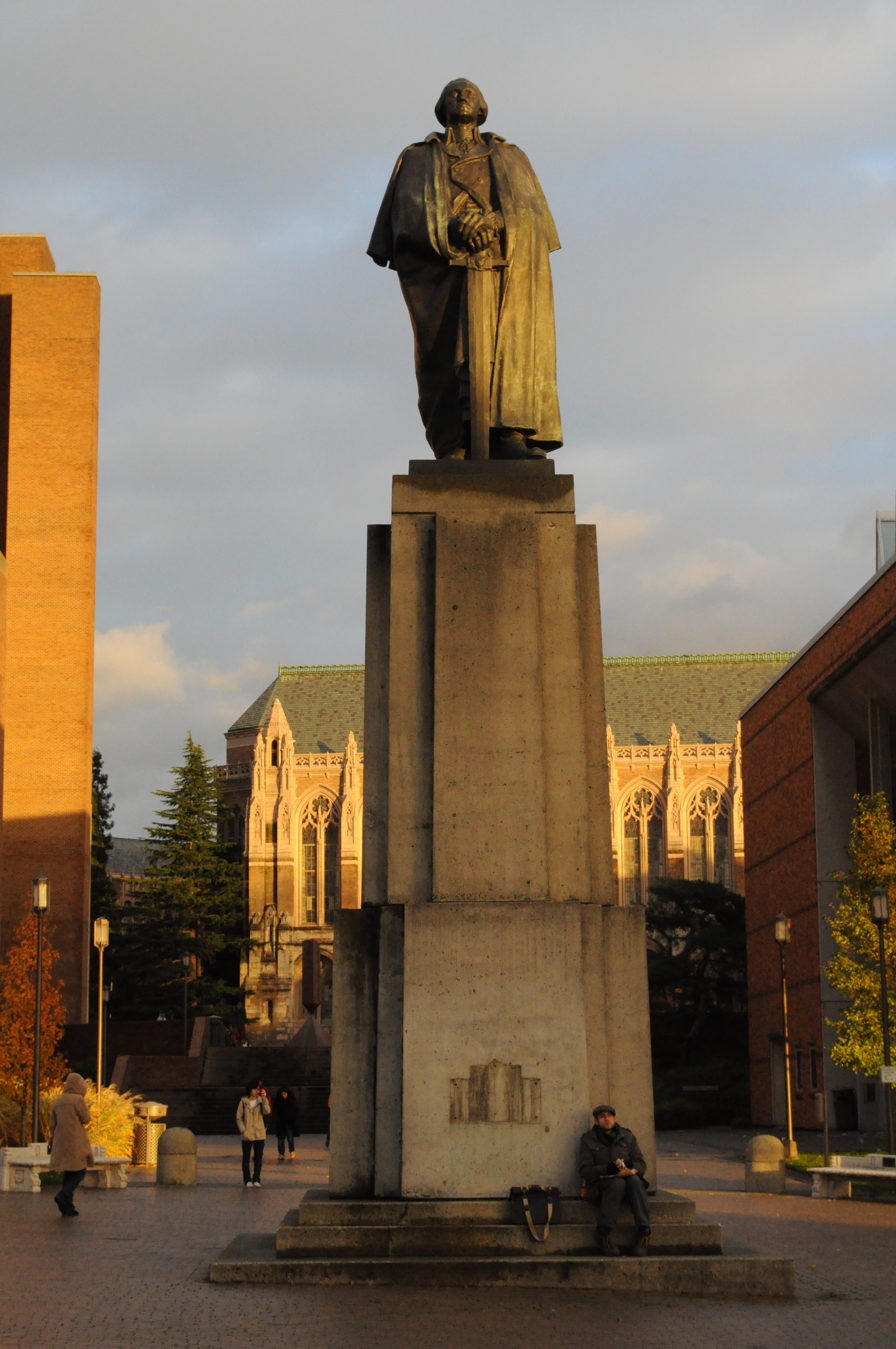
Statue of George Washington (1909), by Lorado Taft, University of Washington, Seattle

==== Wisconsin ====
- Washington Monument (1885), by Richard Henry Park, Court of Honor, Milwaukee
- Copy (1911) after George Washington by Jean-Antoine Houdon (1791), Oshkosh
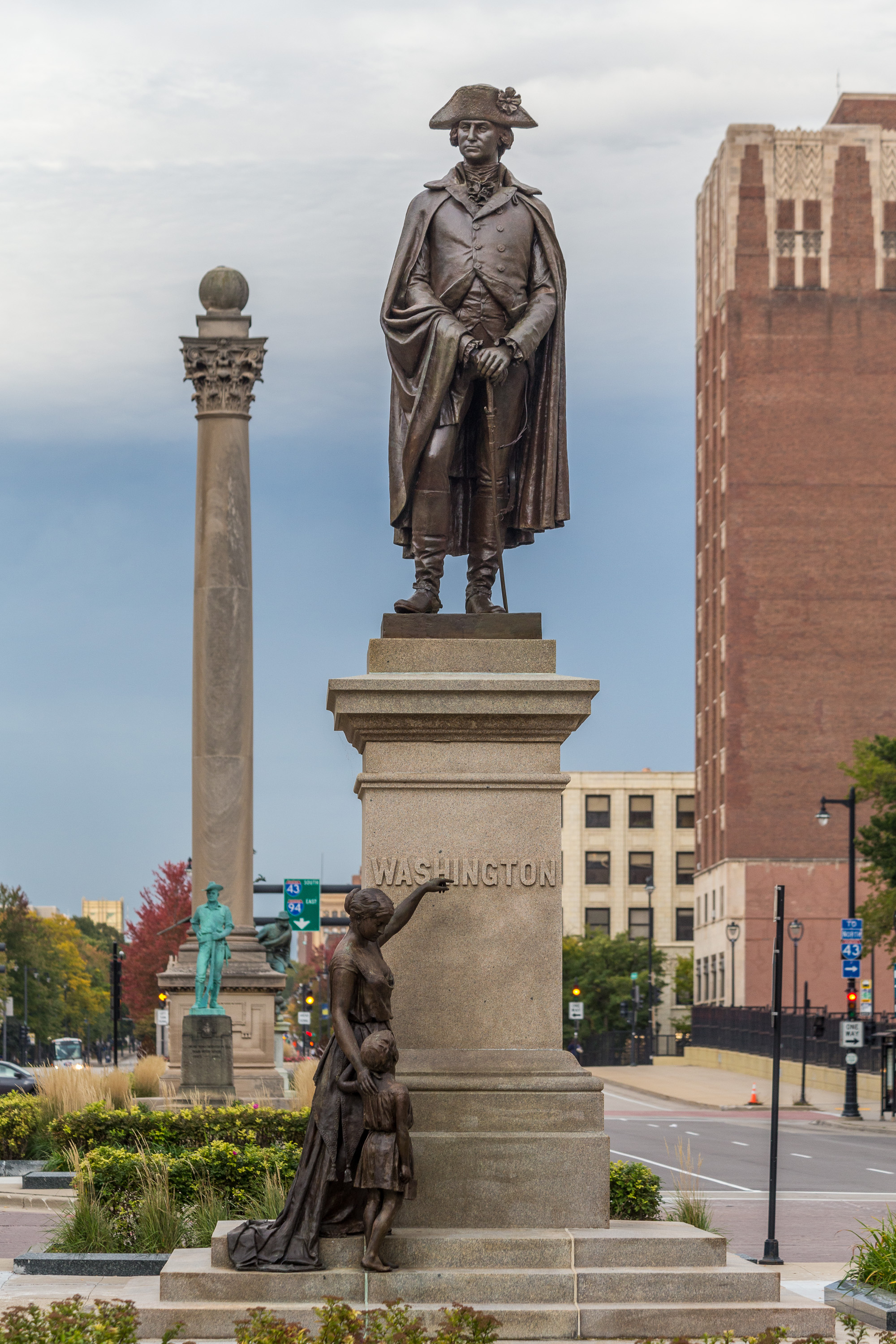
Washington Monument (1885), by Richard Henry Park, Court of Honor, Milwaukee

==== Wyoming ====
- George Washington Memorial Park (Jackson, Wyoming), dedicated 1932, rededicated 1975
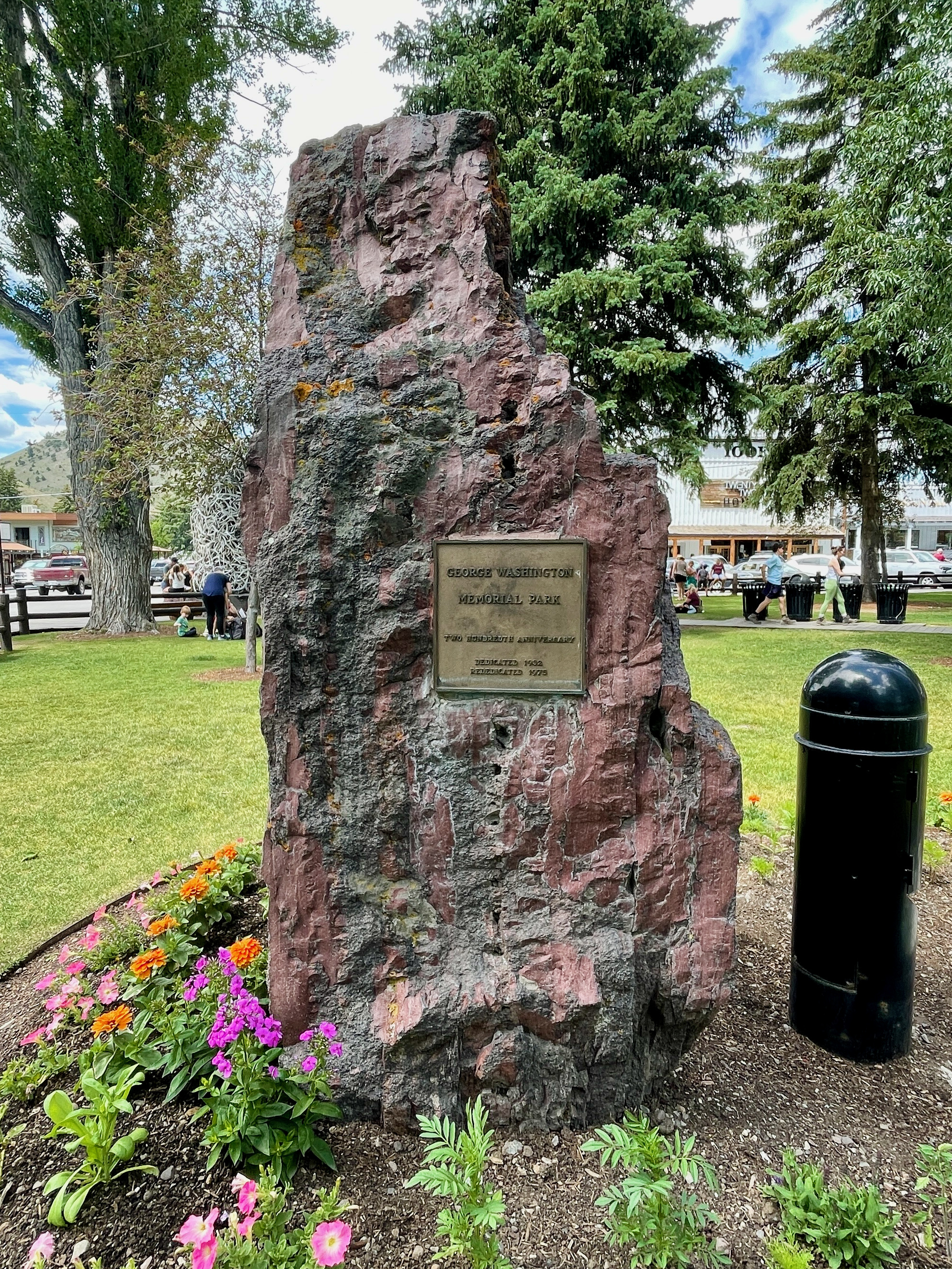
Boulder with park plaque

=== Colombia ===
- Copy after George Washington by Jean-Antoine Houdon (1791), Barranquilla
- Monument Dedicated to George Washington by Luís Pinto Maldonado (1963), Santa Fe, Bogotá
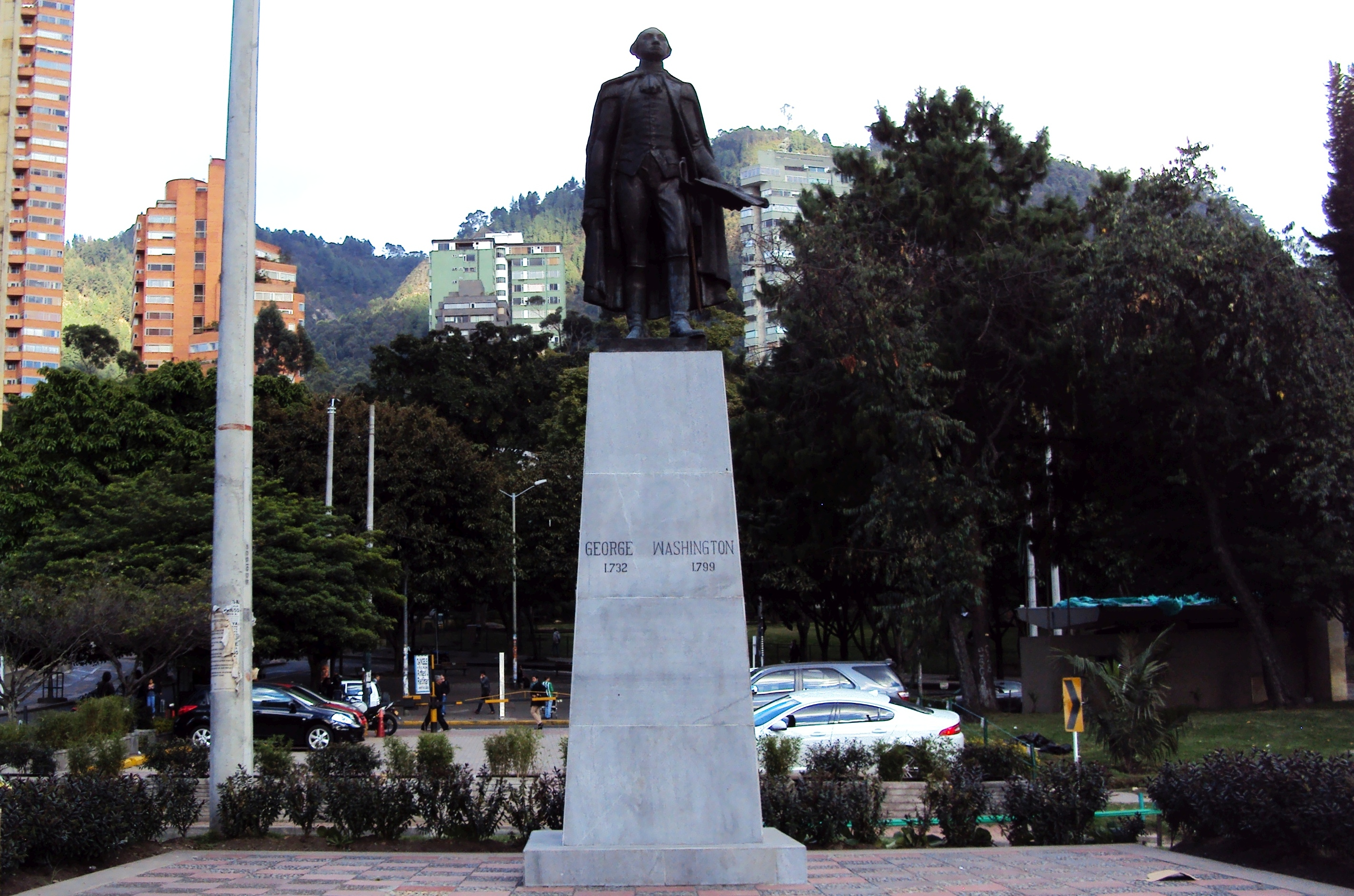
George Washington, Bogotá

=== France ===
- La Fayette and Washington (1890–1900), by Auguste Bartholdi, Place des États-Unis, Paris
- Equestrian statue of George Washington (1900), by Daniel Chester French and Edward Clark Potter, Place d'Iéna, Paris
- Copy after George Washington by Jean-Antoine Houdon (1791), Saint-Martin-de-Ré
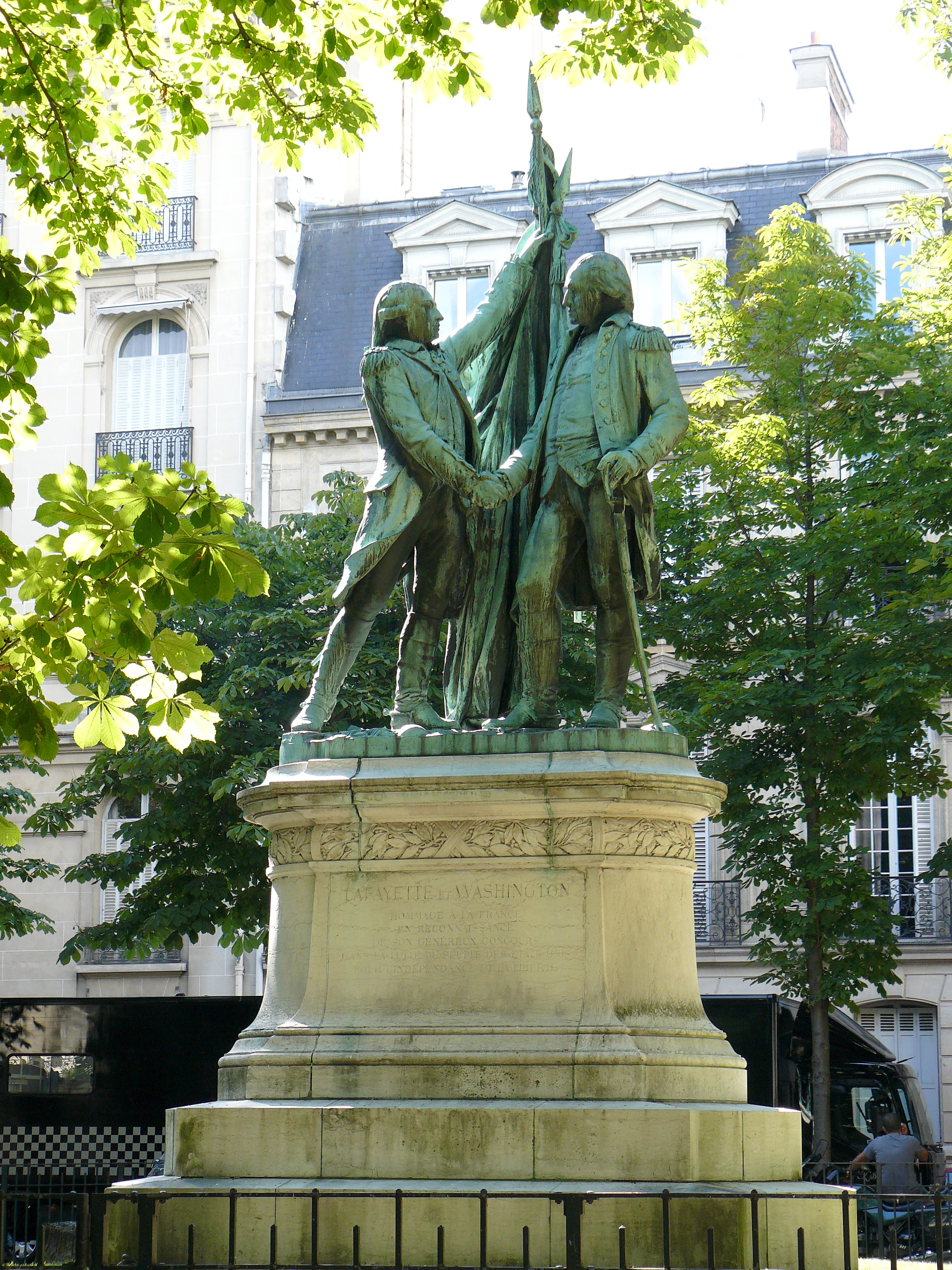
La Fayette and Washington (1890–1900), by Auguste Bartholdi

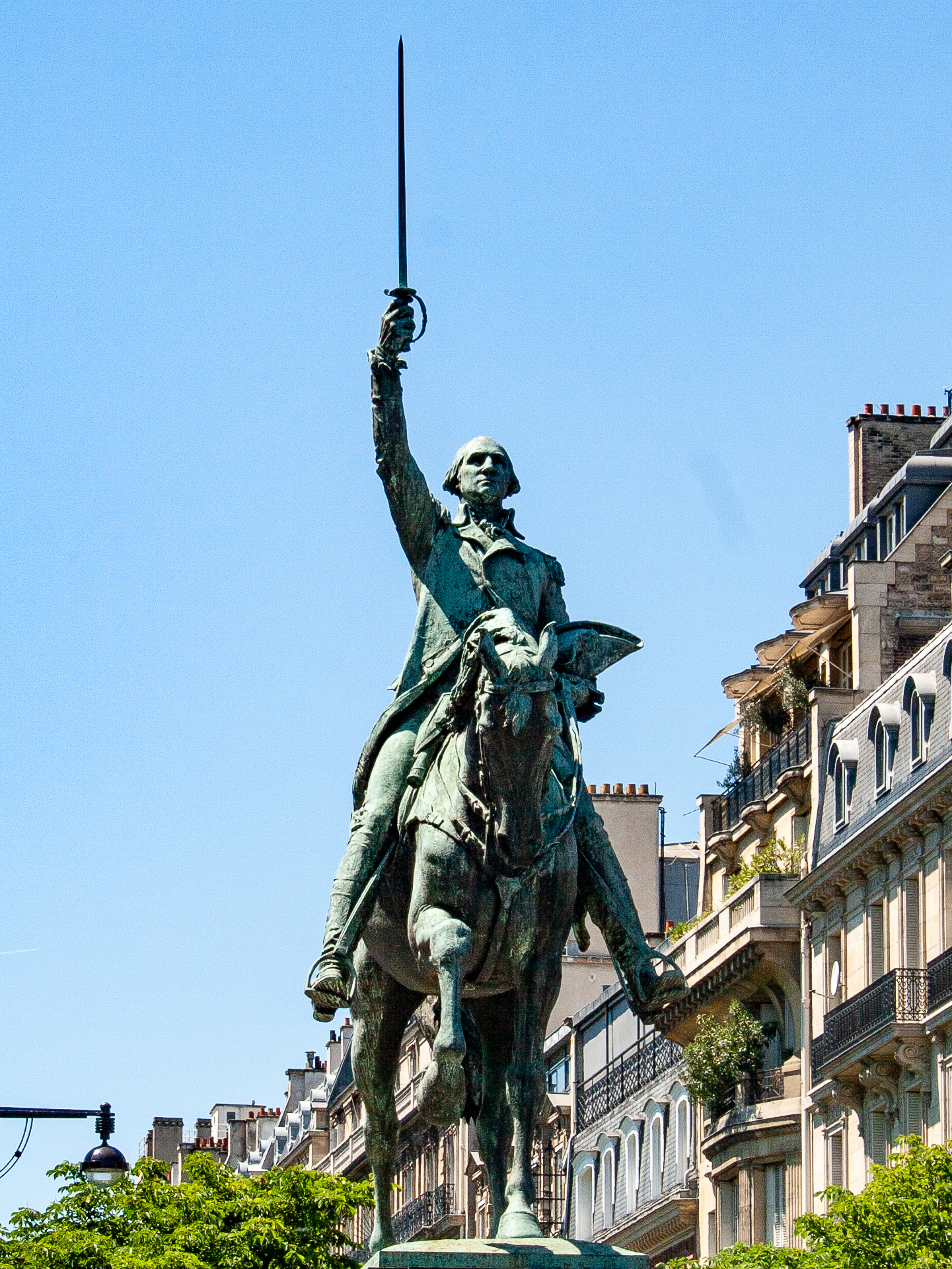
George Washington (1900), by Daniel Chester French and Edward Clark Potter, Place d'Iéna, Paris

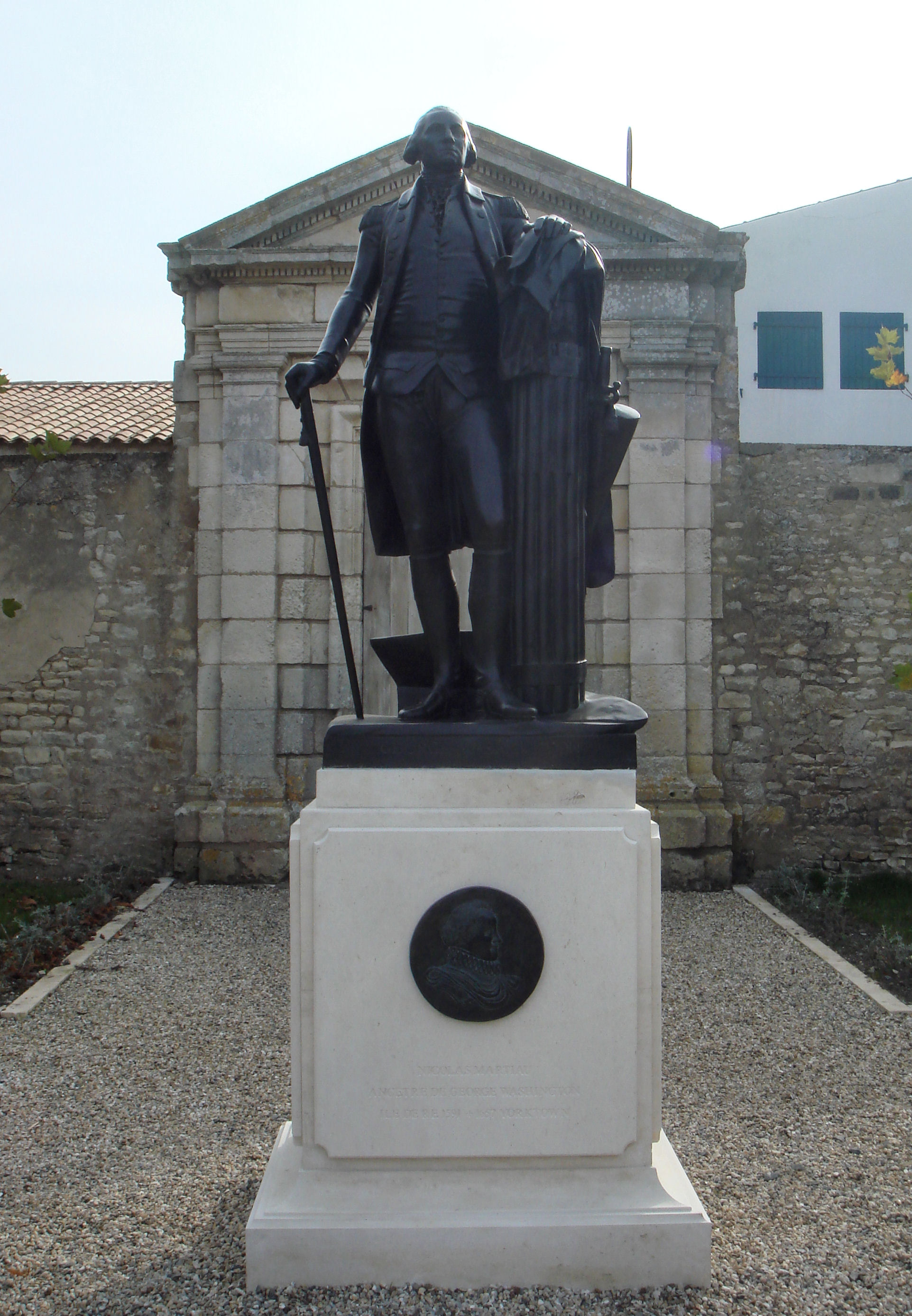
George Washington, Saint-Martin-de-Ré

=== Hungary ===
- George Washington, Father of American Democracy (1906), by Gyula Bezerédi, City Park, Budapest. A gift from Hungarian-Americans.
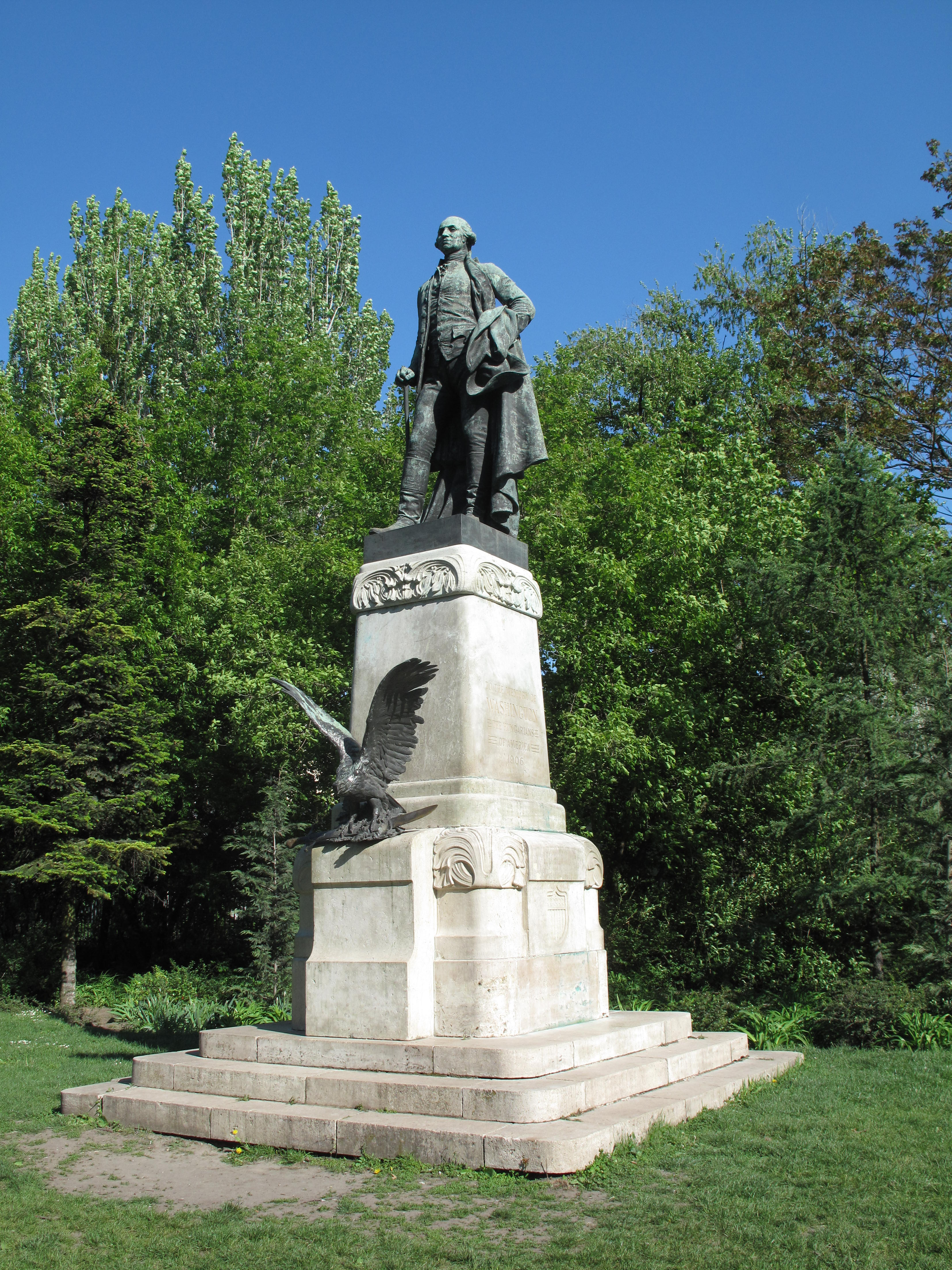
George Washington (1906), by Gyula Bezerédi, City Park, Budapest

=== Mexico ===
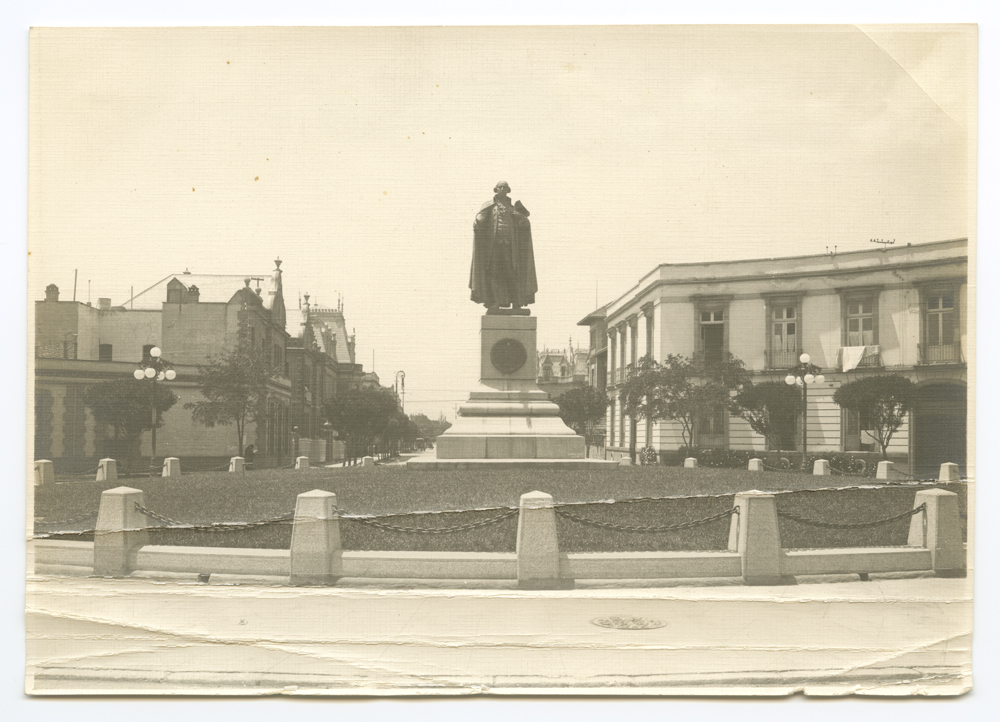
George Washington, Mexico City (unclear as to which of the below this is)
- George Washington (1910–12, destroyed), by Pompeo Coppini, Plaza Washington, Colonia Juárez, Mexico City. A gift from Americans commemorating the 1910 centennial of Mexican Independence, the statue was toppled and dragged through the streets in reaction to the 1914 United States invasion of Veracruz.
- Another Statue of George Washington was presented to the city by the United States government in 1916.

=== Peru ===
- Copy after George Washington by Jean-Antoine Houdon (1791), Lima
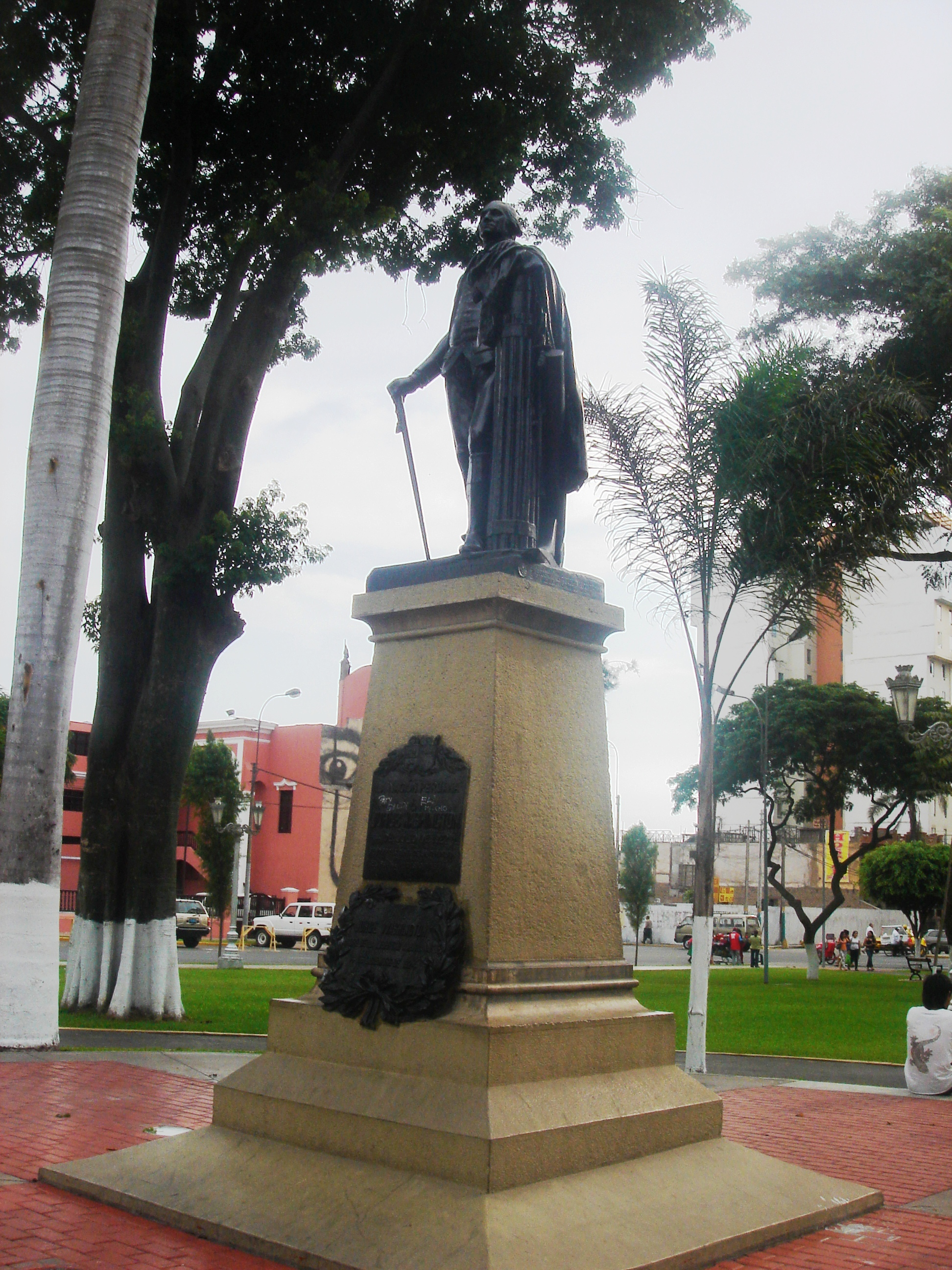
George Washington, Lima

=== Poland ===
- Bust of George Washington by Bronisław Koniuszy and Bronisław Kubica (1989), Warsaw
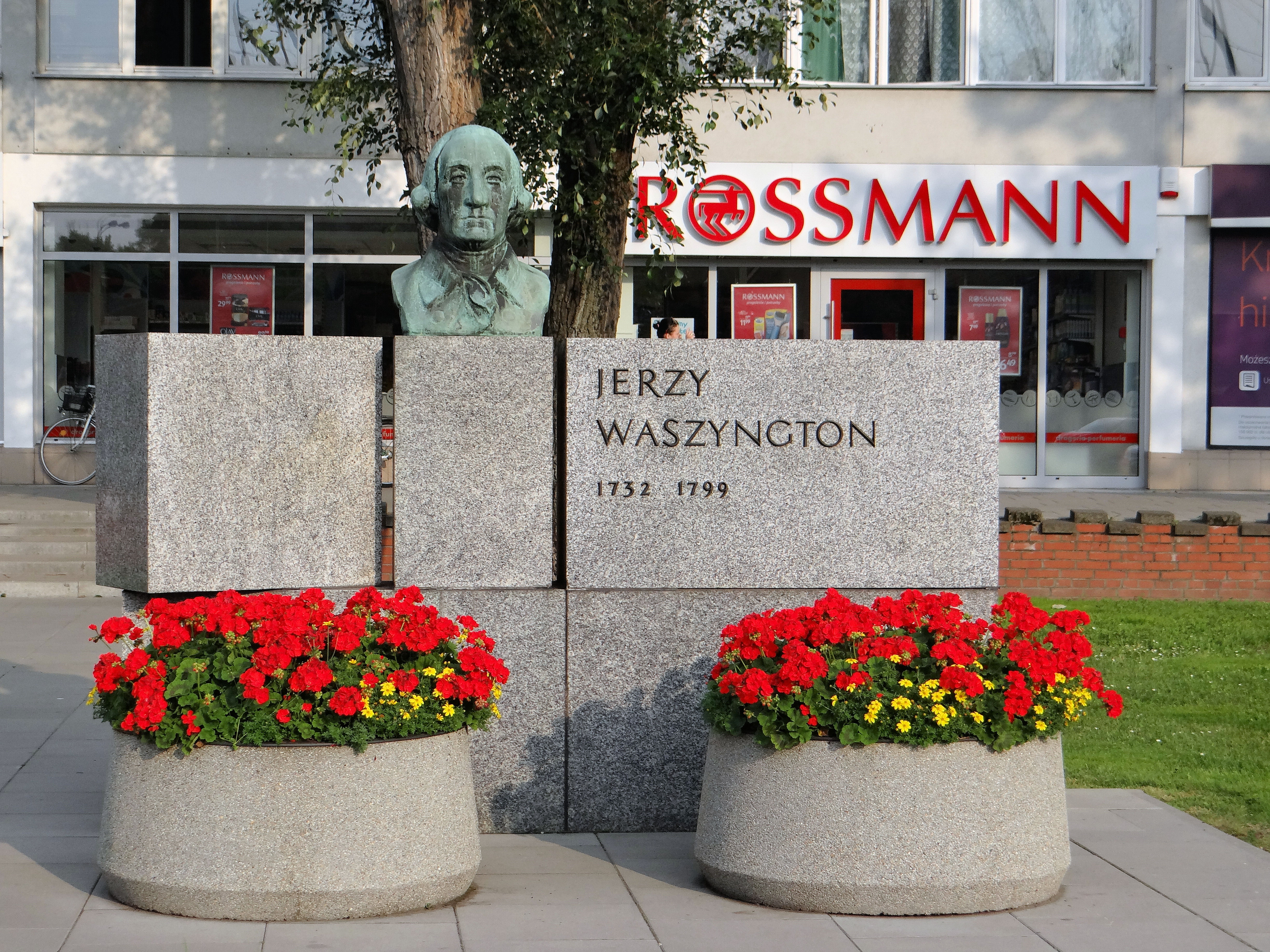
Bust of George Washington, Warsaw

=== Thailand ===
- Washington Square Soi, Bangkok

=== United Kingdom ===
- Copy (1921) after George Washington by Jean-Antoine Houdon (1791), in front of National Gallery, Trafalgar Square, London
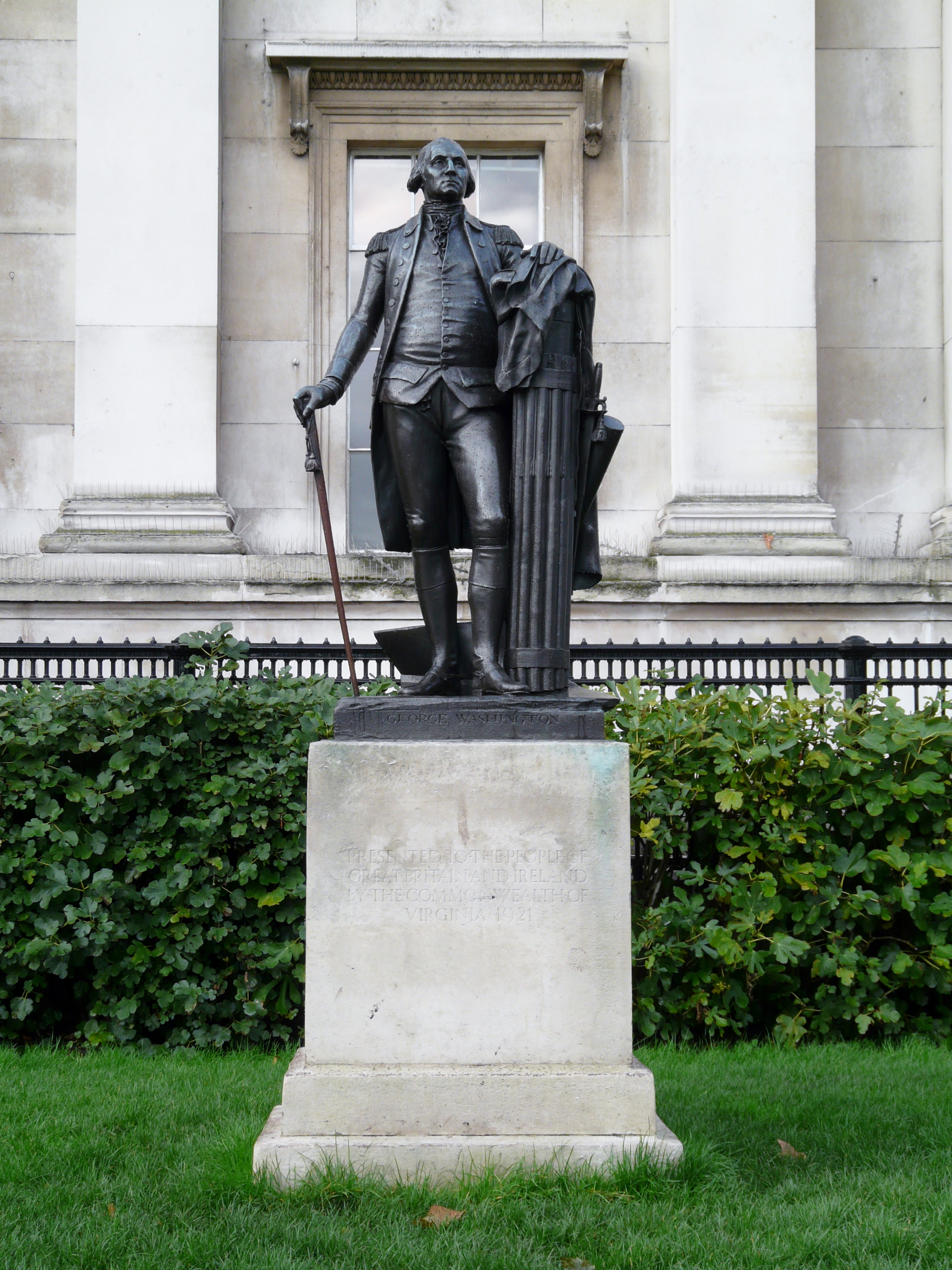
Statue of Washington, London

=== Venezuela ===
- George Washington (1883), by William Rudolf O'Donovan, Plaza Washington, El Paraiso, Caracas

== Other ==
=== In the United States ===
- Washington (state)
- Washington Territory
- Washington-on-the-Brazos, Texas

Some of the locations below are named for George Washington:

- the 241 townships in the United States named Washington; see Washington Township (disambiguation)
- the 26 cities, 1 borough, and 1 village named Washington; see Washington (disambiguation)
- the 2 villages and 1 borough named Washingtonville (disambiguation)
- the 15 mountains, town, city, and four neighborhoods named Mount Washington

=== Outside the United States ===
Places named for George Washington outside of the United States include:

- George Washington, a small town in Villa Clara Province, Cuba
- George Washington Avenue (Spanish: Avenida George Washington) in Santo Domingo, Dominican Republic
- George Washington Avenue (Polish: Aleja Jerzego Waszyngtona) in Warsaw, Poland
- George Washington Roundabout (Polish: Rondo Jerzego Waszyngtona) in Warsaw, Poland
- George Washington Street (Serbian: Улица Џорџа Вашингтона/Ulica Džordža Vašingtona) in Belgrade, Serbia
- New Washington, a small town in Aklan Province, Philippines
- Washington Avenue (Italian: Viale Washington) in Rome, Italy
- Washington Avenue (German: Washington Allee) in Hamburg, Germany
- Washington Island, a coral atoll belonging to Kiribati
- Washington Street in Glasgow, Scotland, United Kingdom
- Washington Street (French: Rue Washington) in Paris, France; 8th arrondissement
- Washington Street (French: Rue Washington; Dutch: Washingtonstraat) in Ixelles, Brussels-Capital Region, Belgium
- Washington Street, Cork, in Cork, Ireland
- Washington Park (Spanish: Parque Washington) in Barranquilla, Colombia
- George Washington Street (Ukrainian: Вулиця Джорджа Вашингтона) in Lviv, Ukraine
- Washington Place, a village in Dasmariñas, Cavite, Philippines
- Cape Washington, in Antarctica

== See also ==
- Washington (disambiguation)
- George Washington (disambiguation)
- Cultural depictions of George Washington
- List of George Washington articles
- List of paintings of George Washington
- List of statues of George Washington
- List of places named for Thomas Jefferson
- List of places named for James Monroe
- List of places named for Andrew Jackson
- List of places named for James K. Polk
- List of things named after Ronald Reagan
- List of things named after George H. W. Bush
- List of things named after Bill Clinton
- List of things named after Barack Obama
- Presidential memorials in the United States
