= Washington District (disambiguation) =

Washington district or variant, may refer to:

== United States ==
- Washington District, a Norfolk Southern railway line in Virginia
- Washington Vermont Senate District, the Vermont State Senate district encompassing Washington County
- Washington District, Jackson County, West Virginia, a former magisterial district that existed from 1863 to the 1990s
- Washington District, South Carolina, a former judicial district that existed during 1791–1800
- Washington District, a mining district in Nevada established in the 1860s as part of the Reese River excitement
- Washington District, North Carolina, a former jurisdiction that existed during 1776–1777
  - Washington District Regiment

=== District of Columbia ===
- Washington, D.C.
  - District of Columbia (until 1871), Washington's federal district
- District of Columbia's at-large congressional district, congressional district for Washington
- Naval District Washington (U.S. Navy)
- United States Army Military District of Washington (U.S. Army, Defense Department)
- Department of Washington (district of the U.S. Union Army, Department of War)
- District of Columbia Public Schools, school district for Washington
- Neighborhoods in Washington, D.C.

=== State of Washington ===
- Washington state legislative districts
- Washington's congressional districts
- Oregon and Washington District (Church of the Brethren)
- Lake Washington School District, King County
- School districts in the U.S. state of Washington, see List of school districts in Washington

== Other uses ==
- Washington Avenue Historic District (disambiguation)
- Washington Street Historic District (disambiguation)
- Washington Historic District (disambiguation)
- Washington School District (disambiguation)

== See also ==
- District of Columbia (disambiguation)
- Washington (disambiguation)
- District (disambiguation)
- Washington County (disambiguation)
- Washington Township (disambiguation)
- Washington State (disambiguation)
