= Booker T. Washington High School =

Booker T. Washington High School refers to many schools in the United States named after the African-American education pioneer Booker T. Washington:

== Existing schools ==
- Booker T. Washington Magnet High School (Montgomery, Alabama)
- Booker T. Washington High School (Tuskegee, Alabama)
- Booker T. Washington High School (Miami, Florida)
- Booker T. Washington High School (Pensacola, Florida)
- Booker T. Washington High School (Georgia), in Atlanta, Georgia
- Booker T. Washington School (Terre Haute, Indiana)
- Booker T. Washington High School (New Orleans, Louisiana)
- Booker T. Washington High School (Shreveport, Louisiana)
- Booker T. Washington High School (Oklahoma)
- Booker T. Washington High School (Columbia, South Carolina)
- Booker T. Washington High School (Tennessee), in Memphis, Tennessee
- Booker T. Washington High School for the Performing and Visual Arts (Dallas, Texas)
- Booker T. Washington High School (Houston, Texas)
- Booker T. Washington High School (Virginia), in Norfolk, Virginia
- Booker T. Washington Public Charter School (Washington, D.C.)

== Former schools ==
- Booker T. Washington School (Montgomery, Alabama)
- Booker T. Washington High School (El Dorado, Arkansas)
- Booker T. Washington High School (Jonesboro, Arkansas)
- Booker T. Washington School (Rushville, Indiana)
- Booker T. Washington School (Ashland, Kentucky)
- Booker T. Washington High School (Rocky Mount, North Carolina). Now a community center.
- Booker T. Washington High School (Plainview, Texas)
- Booker T. Washington High School (West Virginia) in London, West Virginia

== See also ==
- List of things named after Booker T. Washington
- Booker T. Washington School (disambiguation)
- Washington County High School (disambiguation)
- Washington High School (disambiguation)
