= Booker T. Washington School =

Booker T. Washington School may refer to:

- Booker T. Washington School (Rushville, Indiana), listed on the National Register of Historic Places in Rush County, Indiana
- Booker T. Washington School (Terre Haute, Indiana), listed on the National Register of Historic Places in Vigo County, Indiana
- Booker T. Washington School (Ashland, Kentucky), a historic African-American school
- Booker T. Washington School (Montgomery, Alabama), Montgomery's first high school for African Americans
- Booker T. Washington School, an elementary school in the Las Cruces Public Schools district in Las Cruces, New Mexico
- Booker T. Washington School (Dover, Delaware) school that served African American students before integration and is now an elementary school
- Booker T. Washington Junior / Senior High School in Tampa, Florida, now the B. T. Washington Elementary School, part of Hillsborough County Schools

== See also ==
- Booker T. Washington High School (disambiguation)
