= Washington =

Washington most commonly refers to:

- George Washington (1732–1799), the first president of the United States
- Washington (state), a state in the Pacific Northwest of the United States
- Washington, D.C., the capital of the United States
  - A metonym for the federal government of the United States
  - Washington metropolitan area, the metropolitan area centered on Washington, D.C.

Washington may also refer to:

== Places ==
=== England ===
- Washington Old Hall, ancestral home of the family of George Washington
- Washington, Tyne and Wear, a town in the City of Sunderland metropolitan borough
- Washington, West Sussex, a village and civil parish

=== Greenland ===
- Cape Washington, Greenland
- Washington Land

=== Philippines ===
- New Washington, Aklan, a municipality
- Washington, a barangay in Catarman, Northern Samar
- Washington, a barangay in Escalante, Negros Occidental
- Washington, a barangay in San Jacinto, Masbate
- Washington, a barangay in Surigao City

=== United States ===
- Washington, Alabama
- Washington, Arkansas
- Washington, California, in Nevada County
- Washington Colony, California, settlement located near what is now Easton, California
- Washington, Yolo County, California
- Washington, Connecticut
- Washington, Georgia
- Washington, Illinois
- Washington, Indiana
- Washington, Iowa
- Washington, Kansas
- Washington, Kentucky
- Washington, Louisiana
- Washington, Maine
- Washington, Massachusetts
- Washington, Michigan, an unincorporated community in Washington Township
- Washington, Mississippi
- Washington, Missouri
- Washington, Nebraska
- Washington, New Hampshire
- Washington, New Jersey
- Washington, New York
- Washington, North Carolina
- Washington Court House, Ohio
- Washington, Oklahoma
- Washington, Pennsylvania
- Washington, Rhode Island
- Washington-on-the-Brazos, Texas
- Washington, Utah
- Washington, Vermont
- Washington, Virginia
- Washington, West Virginia
- Washington, Wisconsin (disambiguation)

=== Elsewhere ===
- Washington Escarpment, Antarctica
- Washington, Ontario, Canada
- George Washington, Cuba (also known as Washington)
- Washington Island (French Polynesia)
- Washington, Guyana, a community in Mahaica-Berbice, Guyana
- Washington Island (Kiribati)

== Education ==
=== Higher education ===
==== In the United States ====
- Central Washington University, Ellensburg, Washington
- Eastern Washington University, Cheney, Washington
- George Washington University, Washington, D.C.
- Harold Washington College, Chicago, Illinois
- Trinity Washington University, Washington, D.C.
- University of Mary Washington, Fredericksburg, Virginia
- University of Washington, Seattle, Washington
- Washington Adventist University, Takoma Park, Maryland
- Washington College, Washington, Pennsylvania; merged with Jefferson College in 1865 to form Washington & Jefferson College
- Washington College, Lexington, Virginia; renamed Washington and Lee University in 1870
- Washington College, Chestertown, Maryland
- Washington College of Law, at American University, Washington, D.C.
- Washington Female Seminary, Washington, Pennsylvania
- Washington Medical College, a defunct institution formerly in Baltimore, Maryland
- Washington State University, Pullman, Washington
- Washington University in St. Louis, Missouri
- Western Washington University, Bellingham, Washington

==== Outside of the United States ====
- Washington International University, unaccredited institution in the British Virgin Islands
- Washington University of Barbados, named as part of an international medical school scam

=== Secondary education ===
- Booker T. Washington High School (disambiguation)
- George Washington High School (disambiguation)
- Lake Washington High School, Kirkland, Washington
- Washington Academy (Maine), East Machias, Maine
- Washington Academy, Sunderland, England, UK
- Washington College Academy, Limestone, Tennessee
- Washington College of Science and Industry, formerly in Irvington, California
- Washington County High School (disambiguation)
- Washington High School (disambiguation)
- Washington International School, Washington, D.C.
- Washington School (disambiguation)

== People ==
- Washington (name), a given name or surname
- Washington family, American family
- Washington (musician), the stage name of Australian musician Megan Washington
- Washington (footballer, born 1953), Brazilian football forward Washington Luiz de Paula
- Washington (footballer, born 10 April 1975), Brazilian football striker Washington Luiz Pereira dos Santos
- Washington (footballer, born August 1978), Brazilian football forward Washington Luiz Mascarenhas Silva
- Washington (footballer, born November 1978), Brazilian football forward Washington Luigi Garcia
- Washington (footballer, born 1985), Brazilian football striker Washington Roberto Mariano da Silva
- Washington (footballer, born November 1986), Brazilian football midfielder Cezar Washington Alves Portela
- Washington (footballer, born 1989), Brazilian football midfielder Washington Santana da Silva
- Washington (footballer, born 1 April 1975), Brazilian football manager and former striker Washington Stecanela Cerqueira

== Ships ==
- SS Washington (1930), an ocean liner
- SS Washington (1941), a cargo ship
- USS Washington, several U.S. Navy ships
- Washington (1837 ship)
- Washington (1851 steamboat)

== Sports ==
=== In the Washington, D.C., metropolitan area ===
- Washington Capitals, professional ice hockey team of the National Hockey League
- Washington Commanders, formerly Washington Redskins, professional American football team of the National Football League
- Washington Mystics, professional basketball team of the Women's National Basketball Association
- Washington Nationals, professional baseball team of Major League Baseball
- Washington Wizards, professional basketball team of the National Basketball Association

=== In Washington (state) ===
==== Division I ====
- Eastern Washington Eagles, athletic teams of Eastern Washington University in Cheney, Washington
- Washington Huskies, athletic teams of the University of Washington in Seattle, Washington
- Washington State Cougars, athletic teams of Washington State University in Pullman, Washington

==== Division II ====
- Central Washington Wildcats, athletic teams of Central Washington University in Ellensburg, Washington
- Western Washington Vikings, athletic teams of Western Washington University in Bellingham, Washington

=== Elsewhere ===
- Washington F.C., a football club based in Washington, Tyne and Wear, England
- Washington University Bears, athletic teams of Washington University in St. Louis, Missouri, US

== Other uses ==
- Boeing Washington, British designation for the Boeing B-29 Superfortress
- The Washington Post, American daily newspaper
- Washington, D.C. (novel), 1967, by Gore Vidal
- Washington station (disambiguation)
- Washington (tree), a giant sequoia in Sequoia National Park, California, US
- Washington, a planned film in the series USA: Land of Opportunities, ultimately abandoned

== See also ==
- Washingtonian (disambiguation)
- 2013 Washington, Illinois tornado
- Fort Washington (disambiguation)
- Lake Washington (disambiguation)
- Mount Washington (disambiguation)
- Port Washington (disambiguation)
- Washington Avenue (disambiguation)
- Washington Bridge (disambiguation)
- Washington Boulevard (disambiguation)
- Washington County (disambiguation)
- Washington district (disambiguation)
- Washington Island (disambiguation)
- Washington Park (disambiguation)
- Washington Square (disambiguation)
- Washington Street (disambiguation)
- Washington Township (disambiguation)
- Washington Valley (disambiguation)
