= South Washington Street Historic District =

South Washington Street Historic District may refer to:

- South Washington Street Historic District (Clarkesville, Georgia), listed on the National Register of Historic Places in Habersham County, Georgia
- South Washington Street Historic District (North Attleborough, Massachusetts), listed on the National Register of Historic Places in Bristol County, Massachusetts
- South Washington Street Historic District (Watertown, Wisconsin), listed on the National Register of Historic Places in Jefferson County, Wisconsin

== See also ==
- Washington Street Historic District (disambiguation)
