= Washington Local School District =

Washington Local School District may refer to:

- Washington Court House City School District, Fayette County, Ohio
- Washington Local School District (Lucas County), Lucas County, Ohio

== See also ==
- Washington School District (disambiguation)
- Washington School (disambiguation)
- Washington (disambiguation)
