= Washington Elementary School =

Washington Elementary School, or George Washington Elementary School, is an often-used name in the United States to honor George Washington, the first president of the United States. The name may refer to:

- Washington Elementary School, Glendale Union High School District, Glendale, Arizona
- Washington Elementary School, in Bellflower Unified School District, Los Angeles County, California
- Washington Elementary School, in Corona-Norco Unified School District, Riverside County, California
- Washington Elementary School (Glendora, California), Covina, California
- Washington Elementary School (Oakland, California), in Bushrod, Oakland, California
- Washington Elementary School, in the Riverside Unified School District, Riverside, California
- Washington Elementary School, in San Gabriel Unified School District, San Gabriel, California
- Washington Elementary School (Santa Ana, California), in Santa Ana Unified School District
- Washington Elementary School (Santa Barbara, California), in Santa Barbara Unified School District
- Washington Elementary School (Visalia, California), a school in Visalia, California
- Washington Elementary School, in Colorado Springs School District 11, Colorado Springs, Colorado
- Washington Elementary School (Elgin, Illinois)
- Washington Elementary School, in Evanston/Skokie School District 65, Evanston, Illinois
- Washington Elementary School (Park Ridge, Illinois), in Park Ridge-Niles School District 64
- Washington Elementary School, in Davenport Community School District, Scott County, Iowa
- Washington Elementary School, in Olathe School District, Olathe, Kansas
- Washington Elementary School (Charlotte, Michigan)
- Washington Elementary School, in Wyandotte Public Schools, Wyandotte, Michigan
- Washington Elementary School, in Anoka-Hennepin School District 11, Anoka, Minnesota
- Washington Elementary School, in Bergenfield Public School District, Bergen County, New Jersey
- Washington Elementary School (Hawthorne, New Jersey), in Hawthorne, New Jersey
- Washington Graded and High School, Raleigh, Wake County, North Carolina
- Washington Elementary School, in Fargo Public Schools, Fargo, North Dakota
- Washington Elementary School, in Jamestown Public Schools, Jamestown, North Dakota
- Washington Elementary School, in Minot Public Schools, Minot, North Dakota
- Washington Elementary School, in Valley City Public School District, Valley City, North Dakota
- Washington Elementary School, in Marietta City School District, Marietta, Ohio
- Washington Elementary School (Blackwell, Oklahoma), listed on the National Register of Historic Places (NRHP) in Kay County, Oklahoma
- Washington Elementary School (Medford, Oregon), listed on the NRHP in Jackson County, Oregon
- Washington Elementary School, in Hanover Public School District, Hanover, Pennsylvania
- Washington Elementary School, in Auburn School District, Auburn, Washington
- Washington Elementary School, in Whitewater, Wisconsin

== See also ==
- Fort Washington Elementary School, Upper Dublin School District, Montgomery County, Pennsylvania
- George Washington Elementary School (disambiguation)
- Vare-Washington Elementary School, Philadelphia, Pennsylvania
- Washington District (disambiguation)
- Washington School (disambiguation)
- Washington School District (disambiguation)
