= Washington County School District =

Washington County School District may refer to:

- Washington County School District (Alabama)
- Washington County School District (Georgia)
- Washington County School District (Florida)
- Washington County School District (Utah)

== See also ==
- Washington (disambiguation)
- Washington School (disambiguation)
- Washington County (disambiguation)
- Washington School District (disambiguation)
