= WCSD =

WCSD may refer to:

== School districts in the United States ==
- Wappingers Central School District, New York
- Warren County School District, Pennsylvania
- Washington County School District (disambiguation) (multiple)
- Washoe County School District, Nevada
- Waterloo Community School District, Waterloo, Iowa
- Watertown City School District, New York
- Watson Chapel School District, Jefferson County, Arkansas
- Waukee Community School District, Waukee, Iowa
- Wayne County School District (disambiguation) (multiple)
- Weld County School District RE-1, Gilcrest, Colorado
- Whittier City School District, California
- Williamsville Central School District, New York
- Winterset Community School District, Iowa

== Other ==
- WCSD-LP, a low-power radio station (104.9 FM) licensed to Shawnee-on-Delaware, Pennsylvania
