= Emil Baensch =

American politician (1857-1939)

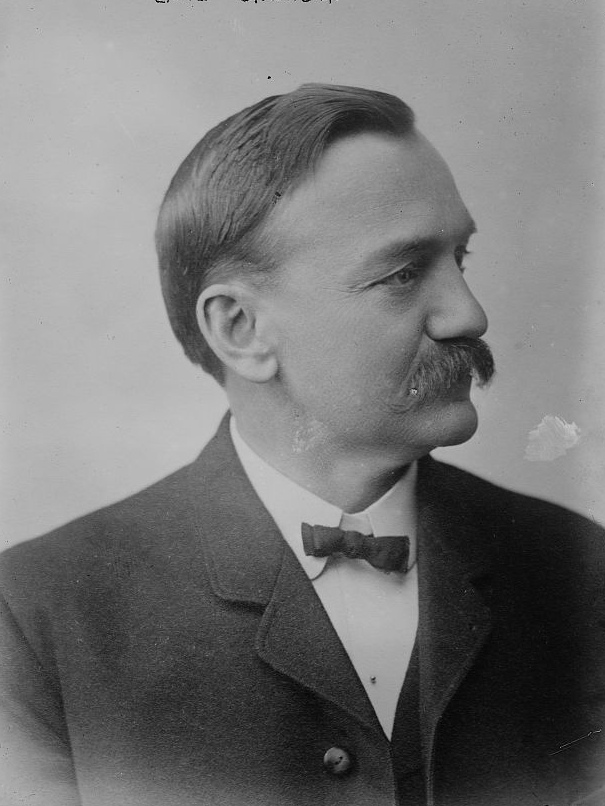
- Emil Baensch circa 1915

17th Lieutenant Governor of Wisconsin
- In office January 7, 1895 – January 2, 1899
- Governor: William H. Upham; Edward Scofield
- Preceded by: Charles Jonas
- Succeeded by: Jesse Stone

County Judge of Manitowoc County, Wisconsin
- In office February 9, 1888 – January 1, 1894
- Appointed by: Jeremiah McLain Rusk
- Preceded by: Carl Schmidt
- Succeeded by: Francis E. Monseau

Personal details
- Born: June 12, 1857 Manitowoc, Wisconsin, U.S.
- Died: August 17, 1939 (aged 82) Manitowoc, Wisconsin, U.S.
- Resting place: Evergreen Cemetery, Manitowoc, Wisconsin
- Party: Republican
- Spouse: Ida Koehler
- Children: Emilida H. (Brown)^{(b. 1883; died 1938)}; Gesine (Pitz)^{(b. 1891; died 1968)}
- Education: University of Wisconsin Law School
- Profession: Lawyer

Emil Baensch (June 12, 1857 – August 17, 1939) was an American lawyer, newspaper publisher, and Republican politician from the U.S. state of Wisconsin. He was the 17th lieutenant governor of Wisconsin.

== Biography ==
Emil Baensch was born in Manitowoc, Wisconsin, on June 12, 1857. His father died in 1862, and his mother remarried. Baensch was educated in public and private schools until age 15, when he went to work as a clerk and bookkeeper. He used his earnings to pay for tuition at the University of Wisconsin Law School. He graduated in 1881 and was admitted to the bar the following year.

In 1881, he also founded the Lake Shore Times newspaper as a Republican partisan paper, in partnership with Fred Haukohl. In 1888, he was appointed county judge of Manitowoc County by Governor Jeremiah McLain Rusk. He was elected to a full term in the Spring of 1889, running on the Republican Party ticket.

In 1894, he won the Republican nomination for lieutenant governor of Wisconsin and was elected alongside Governor William H. Upham. He subsequently won re-election in 1896 and left office in 1899. While serving as lieutenant governor, in 1896, he also became co-owner of the Manitowoc Post.

In 1904, Baensch launched a primary challenge against incumbent governor Robert M. La Follette. La Follette was the leader of the progressive wing of the Republican Party of Wisconsin, and Baensch was a member of the stalwart/conservative wing. The divide in the party led to a split and a separate Republican ticket in the 1904 general election, but La Follette still won re-election to a third term.

He continued running the Manitowoc Post until 1922, and was also active in the Manitowoc Chamber of Commerce until his death in 1939.

Party political offices
Preceded by John C. Koch	Republican nominee for Lieutenant Governor of Wisconsin; 1894, 1896	Succeeded by Jesse Stone
Political offices
Preceded by Charles Jonas	Lieutenant Governor of Wisconsin; January 7, 1895 – January 2, 1899	Succeeded by Jesse Stone
Legal offices
Preceded by Carl Schmidt	County Judge of Manitowoc County, Wisconsin; February 9, 1888 – January 7, 1895	Succeeded by Francis E. Monseau
