= Washington micropolitan area =

The Washington micropolitan area may refer to:

- The Washington, North Carolina micropolitan area, United States
- The Washington, Indiana micropolitan area, United States
- The Washington Court House, Ohio micropolitan area, United States

== See also ==
- Washington metropolitan area
- Washington (disambiguation)
