= Washington School District =

Washington School District may refer to:

- School District of Washington, Washington, Missouri, US
- Washington School District (Pennsylvania), Washington County, Pennsylvania, US
- Washington School District (Arkansas), Hempstead County, Arkansas, US
- Washington Elementary School District, Phoenix-Glendale, Arizona, US
- Lake Washington School District, King County, Washington, US
- Metropolitan School District of Washington Township, Indianapolis, Indiana, US
- Washington County School District (disambiguation)
- Washington Local School District (disambiguation)
- School districts in the U.S. state of Washington, see List of school districts in Washington
- District of Columbia Public Schools (DCPS), the school district for Washington, DC.
- District of Columbia Public Charter School Board, a separate institution from DCPS that governs public charter schools in Washington, DC.

== See also ==
- Washington District (disambiguation)
- Washington Elementary School (disambiguation)
- Washington School (disambiguation)
- Washington (disambiguation)
