= Western Pennsylvania "Kill for Thrill" murders =

1979–1980 spree murders in Western Pennsylvania

- Location: Western Pennsylvania, US
- Date: December 27, 1979 – January 3, 1980
- Attack type: Spree murder; kidnapping
- Deaths: 4
- Perpetrators: John Charles Lesko; Michael J. Travaglia
- Motive: Thrill killing
- Verdict: Guilty on all counts
- Convictions: First-degree murder Second-degree murder Third-degree murder
- Sentence: Death

Within an eight-day period between December 1979 and January 1980, two men, Michael J. Travaglia (August 31, 1958 – September 4, 2017) and John Charles Lesko (born November 11, 1958) committed four murders across different locations in Western Pennsylvania, United States. The first occurred on December 27, 1979, when 49-year-old night watchman Peter A. Levato was shot to death by the pair, and the second victim, 26-year-old Marlene Sue Newcomer was shot and killed in a downtown Pittsburgh parking garage on January 1, 1980. The third murder took place on January 2, 1980, when William Nicholls, a 32-year-old church organist, was kidnapped from a bar and drowned in a lake by the pair. The fourth and final murder was committed on January 3, 1980, when Apollo police officer Leonard C. Miller was shot and murdered by the duo.

Lesko and Travaglia were both arrested for Miller’s murder and were later linked to the first three homicides. They were subsequently charged in connection with the spree killings, which became known as the "Kill for Thrill" murders of Western Pennsylvania. Both men were convicted and sentenced to death for Miller's murder, as well as long prison sentences (including life imprisonment) for the murders of Levato, Newcomer, and Nicholls.

Travaglia spent 35 years on death row before he died of natural causes on September 4, 2017, while awaiting his execution. Lesko remains incarcerated on Pennsylvania's death row as of 2026.

== Background of John Lesko and Michael Travaglia ==
Born on August 31, 1958, Michael J. Travaglia was raised in a relatively stable but strict family in Washington Township, Pennsylvania. His father, Bernard, was described as demanding and as setting high goals for his son while rarely being satisfied with his accomplishments. A neighbor testified that Travaglia seemed to grow up "in the shadow" of an older brother, while another witness said he appeared to resent being judged as inferior. He was described by some people as polite and friendly, but others noticed his dislike of authority and resentment of the restrictions placed on him. According to his father, Travaglia's behavior changed after he became involved with amphetamines. By the time of his arrest, he was heavily involved with drugs.

John Lesko

John Lesko, who was born on November 11, 1958, had a different childhood. He was the oldest of six children born to Mary Ann Fedorka, with each child having a different father. The fathers abandoned the family, and when Lesko was eight, his mother, who said she had nowhere to go with her children, placed him in the care of child welfare authorities. He spent the next seven years moving between various orphanages before eventually living with his grandmother. After spending three years with his grandmother, Lesko joined the United States Marine Corps, but he later received an administrative, non-honorable discharge from the service. He then tried to find his biological father but was unsuccessful. After briefly returning to his grandmother, he eventually lived on the streets. In 1979, he planned to marry Patricia Hess, but the wedding never took place. Hess described him as moody and unpredictable, while his aunt said he seemed deeply troubled and had something "eating away at him."

Travaglia and Lesko first met each other in November 1979, and the two became involved with drugs. On December 9, 1979, the duo committed a robbery together at a convenience store, where the store clerk Mary Campbell was robbed at gunpoint. According to Campbell, who spoke of her ordeal in a 2017 interview, Travaglia pointed a revolver at her head while Lesko used a hatchet to chop a small red safe from the counter, and the pair tied her hands and ordered her to lay down behind the counter. Campbell recounted that two customers, Richard Stevenson and Larry Clawson, happened to enter the store at that moment, and it prompted the duo to leave the store with $800. Campbell was released from her binds by Clawson and Stevenson.

More than two weeks after the robbery, Lesko and Travaglia would embark on a killing spree that led to the murders of four victims, one of whom was a police officer.

== Spree murders ==
Between late December 1979 and early January 1980, John Lesko and Michael Travaglia committed four murders within an eight-day period throughout Western Pennsylvania.

=== Peter Levato ===
On December 27, 1979, in Pittsburgh, Pennsylvania, Lesko and Travaglia kidnapped their first victim, 49-year-old night watchman Peter Levato, and stole his automobile. Levato was driven to a remote area by his captors, who threw him off the bridge before they ultimately shot him to death with a handgun. Levato's body was found two days later in a wooded area near the Loyalhanna Creek reservoir. An autopsy report showed that Levato was shot once in the chest and twice in the head.

=== Marlene Newcomer ===
On January 1, 1980, 26-year-old Marlene Newcomer was the second victim killed by the duo. Newcomer, a single mother from Connellsville, Pennsylvania, picked up both Travaglia and Lesko, who were both hitchhiking and offered a ride by Newcomer. However, after they accepted the ride, the two men robbed her and fatally shot her inside the car. Her body was subsequently found inside the car, which was abandoned at a parking garage in downtown Pittsburgh.

=== William Nicholls ===
On January 2, 1980, Lesko and Travaglia, accompanied by a third person, 15-year-old runaway Richard Rutherford, kidnapped 32-year-old church organist William Nicholls from outside a Pittsburgh bar. The trio also stole Nicholls's vehicle, where they held Nicholls captive, assaulted him and shot his arm inside the car while they drove it to a wooded location in Indiana County. After they handcuffed Nicholls and tied his feet, both Lesko and Travaglia took him to a lake where they drowned him. The body was found two days later on January 4, 1980, a day after his killers committed their fourth and final murder.

=== Leonard Miller ===
On January 3, 1980, Apollo police officer Leonard Clifford Miller was the fourth and final victim to be murdered by the pair.

On the early morning of January 3, 1980, while he was on duty, Miller spotted a silver-colored Lancia sports car speeding past his police car near a convenience store, and therefore, he pursued and pulled over the vehicle to inspect it. The car was the same vehicle stolen from the third victim William Nicholls and also driven by Lesko, Travaglia and Rutherford at the time of their encounter with Miller.

During the traffic stop, Miller was shot twice with a .38-caliber handgun by Travaglia, and they fled the scene after Miller collapsed on the ground, and before he died, Miller was able to call for help using the radio. The responding police officers found Miller's body at the scene and later discovered the car of Nicholls abandoned near a motel, which gradually brought the spree murders into revelation. On the same day of Miller's murder, the police managed to locate both Lesko and Travaglia and arrest both of them for the four murders.

At the time of his death, Miller, a graduate of the Indiana University of Pennsylvania police academy, was the first African-American police officer employed by the Apollo Police Department. The date of his death also marked only his third day working as a full-time police officer, having first joined the force in 1977 as a part-time officer. Miller was the only child of his family and was unmarried. He was survived by his mother and father, the latter of whom was a retired coal miner. According to his parents, Miller had aspired to become a police officer from a young age. As a child, he was known to spend time with local police officers and frequently watched police shows, reflecting his early interest in law enforcement.

== Trial for Miller case ==
After their arrests, John Lesko and Michael Travaglia were charged with all the four murders. Richard Rutherford was initially charged as an accomplice in the killings of Leonard Miller and William Nicholls, but the charges were later dropped after he testified against Lesko and Travaglia.

Both Lesko and Travaglia were tried together for the murder of Miller. On January 31, 1981, a Westmoreland County jury found both defendants guilty of the first-degree murder of Miller.

On February 3, 1981, the jury unanimous voted to sentence both Travaglia and Lesko to death for the murder of Miller.

On April 24, 1982, Westmoreland Common Pleas Judge Gilfert Mihalich formally sentenced Lesko to death by electrocution.

On May 26, 1982, Travaglia was scheduled to be sentenced by Judge Mihalich on June 4, 1982, after Travaglia's petition for a new trial was denied.

On June 4, 1982, Travaglia was formally sentenced to death via the electric chair by Judge Mihalich.

== Trial for the other three cases ==
On May 20, 1980, John Lesko pleaded guilty to the second-degree murder of William Nicholls, and as a result of the plea, he faced the maximum sentence of life imprisonment.

On May 21, 1980, Michael Travaglia also pleaded guilty to the second-degree murder of Nicholls. Similar to Lesko, he also faced a life sentence for the second-degree murder conviction.

On March 7, 1981, Lesko was found guilty of the first-degree murder of Peter Levato after his trial at the Westmoreland County Common Pleas Court.

On March 21, 1981, Travaglia pleaded guilty to two counts of third-degree murder for the killings of both Marlene Newcomer and Peter Levato. As a result of his plea, Travaglia was sentenced to double sentences of ten to 20 years' imprisonment.

On March 27, 1981, Lesko was found guilty of first-degree murder by a Delaware County jury for the killing of Marlene Newcomer.

On February 26, 1982, Lesko was sentenced to two consecutive life sentences by different judges for the murders of Newcomer and Levato. Judge Charles Loughran sentenced Lesko for the Levato case before another judge, Joseph Hudock, presided over Lesko's sentencing for the Newcomer case.

== Appeal and re-sentencing process ==
=== Travaglia ===
On September 29, 1983, the Pennsylvania Supreme Court denied Michael Travaglia's direct appeal against his death sentence.

In 1996, a federal appellate court overturned Travaglia's death sentence and ordered a re-sentencing trial in the state courts. At the same time, the court also ruled that the death penalty could still remain an option in Travaglia's new sentencing hearing. Travaglia appealed to both the Westmoreland County court and state Superior Court to take the death penalty off the table before his upcoming re-sentencing trial. However, by December 1998, the appeals were dismissed by both courts.

In July 2005, nine years after his sentence was overturned, Travaglia was re-sentenced to death by Judge John Blahovec upon the jury's unanimous recommendation for capital punishment.

=== Lesko ===
On September 29, 1983, John Lesko's appeal was rejected by the Pennsylvania Supreme Court.

On November 13, 1985, the Pennsylvania Supreme Court dismissed Lesko's second appeal against his death sentence.

On February 24, 1987, the U.S. Supreme Court dismissed Lesko's appeal against his death sentence.

On July 28, 1989, the 3rd Circuit Court of Appeals dismissed Lesko's appeal by a 2–1 majority vote.

In February 1992, U.S. District Judge Alan N. Bloch granted Lesko a re-sentencing trial. Three years later, a different jury voted to re-impose the death penalty for Lesko, who was once again sentenced to death on February 17, 1995.

On May 19, 2022, the 3rd Circuit Court of Appeals rejected Lesko's appeal against his death sentence.

== Imprisonment and death of Travaglia ==
=== Execution attempts ===
Since his 1981 sentencing, Michael Travaglia received four death warrants, but his execution was ultimately not carried out. The first attempt was in August 1985, when Governor Dick Thornburgh authorized his execution order and set an execution date of November 18, 1985, the same date as his co-defendant John Lesko, but both men were given a stay of execution several days before they were due to be put to death.

In June 1990, Governor Robert P. Casey signed Travaglia's second death warrant and scheduled his execution for September 11, 1990, but U.S. District Judge Alan N. Bloch issued a stay of execution on September 7, 1990, four days before the scheduled execution.

In July 2012, Travaglia's execution was scheduled for the third time, with the date set for September 13, 2012, but the warrant was later stayed. A fourth death warrant was signed by Governor Tom Corbett, who re-scheduled the execution date for April 25, 2013. However, the same month when he was due to be executed, Travaglia's execution was once again postponed.

=== Death ===
On September 4, 2017, 59-year-old Michael Travaglia died of natural causes at a Washington County hospital after spending 35 years on death row. At the time of his death, Travaglia had been incarcerated at State Correctional Institution – Greene since 1998.

== Current status of Lesko ==
=== Previous death warrants ===
Throughout his time on death row, John Lesko's execution was scheduled six times but all these attempts were stayed due to legal issues. The first attempt was in August 1985, when Governor Dick Thornburgh signed Lesko's death warrant and scheduled an execution date of November 18, 1985. However, several days before the execution could proceed, Lesko was granted a stay of execution.

On May 8, 1986, Lesko's second death warrant was signed, and his execution was re-scheduled for June 17, 1986, but he was granted a stay by the U.S. Supreme Court on June 16, 1986, the eve of his execution.

Lesko's third death warrant was signed 12 years later in September 1998, and his execution was scheduled for November 10, 1998, but he was granted a stay of execution on September 25, 1998, to pursue further appeals. Four months later, in January 1999, Lesko's execution was once again scheduled for the fourth time, with the date fixed on March 18, 1999, but he was granted a stay of execution in February 1999.

In September 2011, Governor Tom Corbett signed Lesko's fifth death warrant and set an execution date of November 9, 2011. The execution was ultimately postponed that same month.

On November 17, 2022, Department of Corrections Acting Secretary George Little signed Lesko's sixth death warrant, setting his execution date as December 29, 2022. Under the laws of the Commonwealth, if the governor did not sign a death warrant within the stipulated time period required, the secretary of corrections had the prerogative to sign a death warrant within the following 30 days. However, due to an ongoing moratorium on Pennsylvania's capital punishment since 2015, Lesko's execution did not proceed as scheduled and he remained on death row since then.

=== Death row ===
By January 1980, 40 years after he committed the spree murders, Lesko is considered the longest-serving death row prisoner incarcerated in Pennsylvania. Since 2015, then Governor Tom Wolf imposed a moratorium on all pending executions in the Commonwealth of Pennsylvania in order to assess the effectiveness of capital punishment. As long as the moratorium remains in effect, it is unlikely that Lesko will ever be executed, and he might spend the rest of his life in prison. The Commonwealth's last execution took place in 1999, when Gary M. Heidnik was put to death for the rape-murders of Deborah Johnson Dudley and Sandra Lindsay.

When he was interviewed by The Washington Post in November 2024, Lesko said he believed that executing him would serve no purpose, explaining that he had been "angry and aimless" when he was first imprisoned but had changed significantly during his decades in prison. He acknowledged the possibility that he could die in prison before his sentence was carried out, while also recognizing that the Commonwealth could resume executions and potentially execute him. Lesko further stated that he wished for a chance to speak to the victims' families, and he would understand if they wanted to see his death sentence carried out.

Following a 2019 state settlement that eased restrictions on Pennsylvania prisoners sentenced to death, Lesko was permitted to spend substantially more time outside his cell than the previous limit of approximately ten hours per week. He was able to socialize with other inmates and work prison jobs. During his incarceration, Lesko also studied law and religious texts and became increasingly devoted to his Christian faith. He subsequently tutored and counseled fellow prisoners and also helped an elderly death-row inmate with dementia eat.

Since 2024, Lesko is presently incarcerated on death row at the State Correctional Institution – Somerset.

== Aftermath ==
The Western Pennsylvania "Kill for Thrill" murders were one of the most infamous homicides to take place in the Commonwealth. Michael Travaglia and John Lesko were amongst the most notable inmates sentenced to death in Pennsylvania.

In 2005, the Apollo Bridge was renamed the Leonard C. Miller Bridge to honor the fallen officer. A scholarship was set up in his name at Apollo-Ridge High School and as of 2020, it was awarded to a senior who intended to major in criminal justice.

True crime writer Michael W. Sheet wrote a book titled Kill for Thrill: The Crime Spree That Rocked Western Pennsylvania, which covered the killing spree, and it was published in 2009.

In a January 2020 interview, Jim Clawson, the retired Apollo police chief, expressed his wish to live long enough to witness Lesko's execution for the murder of Leonard Miller, who was Clawson's friend in the police force. Former governor Tom Corbett, who previously signed the death warrants of Lesko and Travaglia back in the early 2010s, stated that it was frustrating for him that the pair's death sentences were not carried out due to the high-profile nature of the case. Similarly, Tim Geary, a former assistant district attorney who previously prosecuted the duo together with Donetta Ambrose, expressed his frustration with the fact that the pair were not being executed even after several decades since the spree killings occurred.

According to the Pennsylvania Department of Corrections, between 1981 and 2017, a total cost of $2.5 million was incurred to keep both Travaglia and Lesko on death row and it costed a further $230,000 for Westmoreland County to settle the fees for attorneys, experts and transcripts between 1981 to 1996 and 2003 to 2007. An appeal filed by Travaglia in 2013 also incurred a cost of $20,000 from the county.

== See also ==
- Capital punishment in Pennsylvania
- List of death row inmates in the United States § Pennsylvania
- List of rampage killers in the United States
