= Booker T. Washington Middle School =

Booker T. Washington Middle School refers to several schools named after the African-American education pioneer Booker T. Washington:

- Booker T. Washington Middle School (Baltimore), Baltimore
- Booker T. Washington Middle School (Newport News), Newport News, Virginia
- Booker T. Washington Middle School (New York), New York City
- Booker T. Washington Middle School (Tampa)

== See also ==
- List of things named after Booker T. Washington
