= School Street School =

School Street School may refer to the following places:

- School Street School (Haverhill, Massachusetts)
- School Street School (Taunton, Massachusetts)
