= Washington Street =

Washington Street may refer to:

== United States ==
- Washington Street in Alexandria, Virginia
- Washington Street in Atlanta, a fashionable residential boulevard around 1890-1910; see Washington–Rawson
- Washington Street, a former street in Augusta, Georgia; see transportation in Augusta
- Washington Street in Baltimore, Baltimore, Maryland, running near Johns Hopkins Hospital
- Washington Street in Boston, running from downtown Boston southwest to the Massachusetts/Rhode Island border (including other Washington Streets in Boston)
- Washington, MBTA station; several MBTA stations known as Washington Street
- Washington Street in Cape May, New Jersey, New Jersey
- Washington Street in Indianapolis, Indiana, a street which divides northern Indianapolis and southern Indianapolis, originally part of the National Road and still outside of I-465, the route of US 40
- Washington Street in Manhattan, New York

== Ireland ==
- Washington Street, Cork

== See also ==
- Washington (disambiguation)
- Washington Avenue (disambiguation)
- Washington Boulevard (disambiguation)
- Washington Street Historic District (disambiguation)
