= GWHS =

GWHS may refer to:

- Gigawatt-hours (GWhs), a unit of energy

== Schools ==
- George Washington High School (disambiguation)
- George Whittell High School, Zephyr Cove, Nevada, United States
- Glenbard West High School, Glen Ellyn, Illinois, United States
