= Washington, Pennsylvania (disambiguation) =

Washington, Pennsylvania is a city and the county seat of Washington County

Washington, Pennsylvania may also refer to:

- Washington Boro, Pennsylvania, an unincorporated community in Lancaster County
- Washington Crossing, Pennsylvania, an unincorporated village in Bucks County
- Washington Township, Pennsylvania, numerous communities in various counties

== See also ==
- Washington (disambiguation)
