= Jesse Stone (Wisconsin politician) =

American businessman and politician (1836–1902)

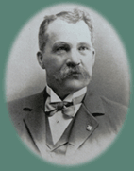

18th Lieutenant Governor of Wisconsin
- In office January 2, 1899 – May 11, 1902 (death)
- Governor: Edward Scofield; Robert M. La Follette
- Preceded by: Emil Baensch
- Succeeded by: James O. Davidson

Member of the Wisconsin State Assembly from the Jefferson 1st district
- In office January 4, 1897 – January 2, 1899
- Preceded by: John G. Conway
- Succeeded by: Harman Grube
- In office January 2, 1882 – January 1, 1883
- Preceded by: Humphrey E. Humphrey
- Succeeded by: Francis V. Piper
- In office January 5, 1880 – January 3, 1881
- Preceded by: Hezekiah Flinn
- Succeeded by: Humphrey E. Humphrey

Personal details
- Born: August 23, 1836 Lincoln, England
- Died: May 11, 1902 (aged 65) Watertown, Wisconsin, U.S.
- Cause of death: Stomach cancer
- Resting place: Oak Hill Cemetery, Watertown
- Party: Republican
- Spouse: Sarah Welch Stone
- Children: William C. Stone
- Profession: Merchant; Politician

Jesse Stone (August 23, 1836 – May 11, 1902) was an English American immigrant, businessman, and Republican politician. He was the 18th lieutenant governor of Wisconsin, serving from January 1899 until his death. Earlier, he served three terms in the Wisconsin State Assembly, representing eastern Jefferson County.

== Early life ==
Stone was born in Lincoln, England, on August 23, 1836. As a young child he emigrated with his family to Waterford, New York, in 1841. He attended the common schools and became a manufacturer in the firm of Woodward and Stone as well as a stockholder in several corporations including the Wisconsin Telephone Company.

== Political career ==
Stone moved to Louisville, Kentucky, in 1855, and then to Watertown, Wisconsin, on August 1, 1869. He served as a Republican member of the Wisconsin State Assembly in 1880, 1882, and 1897. Stone was also a member of the Watertown School Board and was a delegate to the Republican National Conventions in 1888 and 1892, and a member of the central committee from 1888 to 1894.

Stone was elected Lieutenant Governor of Wisconsin in 1898 and was re-elected in 1900, serving from January 2, 1899, until his death on May 11, 1902. He died in Watertown and is interred at Oak Hill Cemetery in Watertown.

== Family life ==
Stone married Sarah Welch in 1854 and they had a son, William C. Stone. Stone's former home in Watertown is located in what is now the South Washington Street Historic District.

Party political offices
Preceded by Emil Baensch	Republican nominee for Lieutenant Governor of Wisconsin; 1898, 1900	Succeeded by James O. Davidson
Wisconsin State Assembly
Preceded by Hezekiah Flinn	Member of the Wisconsin State Assembly from the Jefferson 1st district January 5, 1880 – January 3, 1881	Succeeded by Humphrey E. Humphrey
Preceded by Humphrey E. Humphrey	Member of the Wisconsin State Assembly from the Jefferson 1st district January 2, 1882 – January 1, 1883	Succeeded by Francis V. Piper
Preceded by John G. Conway	Member of the Wisconsin State Assembly from the Jefferson 1st district January 4, 1897 – January 2, 1899	Succeeded by Harman Grube
Political offices
Preceded by Emil Baensch	Lieutenant Governor of Wisconsin; January 2, 1899 – May 11, 1902	Succeeded by James O. Davidson
