= Washington Historic District =

Washington Historic District or variations including Commercial or other may refer to:

in the United States

(by state then city)

- Washington Historic District (Washington, Arkansas), listed on the National Register of Historic Places (NRHP) in Hempstead County, Arkansas
- Washington Commercial Historic District (Washington, Georgia), listed on the NRHP in Wilkes County, Georgia
- Washington Historic District (Washington, Georgia), listed on the NRHP in Wilkes County, Georgia
- West Washington Historic District, South Bend, Indiana, listed on the NRHP in St. Joseph County, Indiana
- Washington Commercial Historic District (Washington, Indiana), listed on the NRHP in Daviess County, Indiana
- Washington Downtown Historic District, Washington, Iowa
- Washington Historic District (Washington, Kentucky), listed on the NRHP in Kentucky
- Washington Historic District (Washington, Louisiana), listed on the NRHP in St. Landry Parish, Louisiana
- Downtown Washington Historic District, Washington, Missouri, listed on the NRHP in Franklin County, Missouri
- Washington Historic District (Washington, North Carolina), listed on the NRHP in Beaufort County, North Carolina
- Old Washington Historic District, Old Washington, Ohio, listed on the NRHP in Guernsey County, Ohio
- Washington Court House Commercial Historic District, Washington Court House, Ohio, listed on the NRHP in Fayette County, Ohio
- East Washington Historic District, East Washington, Pennsylvania, listed on the NRHP in Pennsylvania
- Washington Historic District (Washington, Virginia), listed on the NRHP in Rappahannock County, Virginia

== See also ==
- Washington Avenue Historic District (disambiguation)
- Washington Street Historic District (disambiguation)
- Washington district (disambiguation)
- Washington (disambiguation)
