= Washington Avenue Bridge =

Washington Avenue Bridge may refer to:

Bridges in the United States (by state):

- Washington Avenue Bridge (Waterbury, Connecticut) (State Bridge No. 4534), a bridge in New Haven County, Connecticut, over the Mad River, listed on the NRHP in New Haven County, Connecticut
- Washington Avenue Bridge (Iowa Falls, Iowa) a bridge in Iowa Falls, Iowa, over the Iowa River, listed on the National Register of Historic Places in Hardin County, Iowa
- Washington Avenue Bridge (Minneapolis), a bridge in Minneapolis, Minnesota, over the Mississippi River
- Washington Avenue Bridge (Waco, Texas), a bridge listed on the NRHP in McLennan County, Texas

== See also ==
- Washington Bridge (disambiguation)
- Washington Avenue (disambiguation)
- Washington (disambiguation)
