= Washington Street station =

Washington Street station may refer to:

- Washington Street station (Newark Light Rail) in Newark, New Jersey
- Washington Street station (San Diego Trolley) in San Diego, California
- Washington Street/Grayslake station in Grayslake, Illinois
- Washington Street station (MBTA) in Boston, Massachusetts

== See also ==
- Washington station (disambiguation) § MBTA
