= Washington metropolitan area (disambiguation) =

The Washington metropolitan area is a geographic zone centered in and surrounding Washington, D.C.

Washington metropolitan area also may refer to one of the following U.S. statistical zones:

- Washington, North Carolina, micropolitan area
- Washington, Indiana, micropolitan area
- Washington Court House, Ohio, micropolitan area

== See also ==
- Washington (disambiguation)
