= City government in Washington =

City government in Washington may refer to:

- Government of the District of Columbia, containing Washington, D.C.
- City government in Washington (state)
- Washington, Connecticut, § Government
- Washington, Illinois, § Government
- Washington, Iowa, § Government
- Washington, Massachusetts, § Government
- Washington, Utah, § Government

== See also ==
- For other cities named Washington which may have information regarding their city governments, see Washington (disambiguation)#Places
