= Rusty Jackson =

American football player (1950–1997)

No. 9, 4
- Position: Punter

Personal information
- Born: November 17, 1950; Tuscaloosa, Alabama, U.S.
- Died: April 14, 1997 (aged 46); Baton Rouge, Louisiana, U.S.
- Listed height: 6 ft 2 in (1.88 m)
- Listed weight: 193 lb (88 kg)

Career information
- High school: Washington County (Chatom, Alabama)
- College: LSU
- NFL draft: 1976: undrafted

Career history
- Los Angeles Rams (1976); Buffalo Bills (1978–1979)

Awards and highlights
- PFWA All-Rookie Team (1976); Second-team All-SEC (1972)

Career NFL statistics
- Punts: 260
- Punting yards: 10,050
- Average punt: 38.7
- Longest punt: 70
- Stats at Pro Football Reference

Dalton Sharman "Rusty" Jackson (November 17, 1950 – April 14, 1997) was an American professional football player who was a punter for four seasons for the Los Angeles Rams and Buffalo Bills. Jackson played high school football at Washington County High School in Chatom, Alabama.
