= Washington Township, Michigan =

Washington Township, Michigan may mean:

- Washington Township, Gratiot County, Michigan
- Washington Township, Macomb County, Michigan
- Washington Township, Sanilac County, Michigan

== See also ==
- Washington Township (disambiguation)
