= Washington Township, Nebraska =

Washington Township, Nebraska may refer to the following places:

- Washington Township, Harlan County, Nebraska
- Washington Township, Knox County, Nebraska
- Washington Township, Franklin County, Nebraska
- Washington Township, Hall County, Nebraska

See also

- Washington Township (disambiguation)
