= Washington Avenue =

Washington Avenue may refer to:

== United States ==
- Washington Avenue (Miami Beach) in Miami Beach, Florida
- Washington Avenue in Portland, Maine, a part of Maine State Route 26
- Washington Avenue (Milford Mill, Maryland)
- Washington Avenue (Towson, Maryland)
- Washington Avenue (Minneapolis), a major street in Minneapolis, Minnesota
- Washington Avenue Loft District in St. Louis, Missouri
- Washington Avenue (Las Vegas), Nevada
- Washington Avenue (Sayreville, N.J.)
- Washington Avenue (Brooklyn), New York
  - Washington Avenue (BMT Myrtle Avenue Line), a station on the demolished BMT Myrtle Avenue Line and BMT Lexington Avenue Line
- Washington Avenue (Albany, New York), a major east–west route in the city of Albany, New York
- Washington Avenue (Philadelphia)
- Washington Avenue (Houston, Texas), a road in Houston, Texas
- Washington Avenue (Washington, D.C.)

== See also ==
- Fort Washington Avenue
- Washington Avenue Historic District (disambiguation)
- Washington Avenue Bridge (disambiguation)
- Washington Street (disambiguation)
- Washington Boulevard (disambiguation)
- Washington (disambiguation)
