= Washington Township, Oklahoma =

Washington Township, Oklahoma may refer to the following places:

- Washington Township, Garfield County, Oklahoma
- Washington Township, Grady County, Oklahoma
- Washington Township, Love County, Oklahoma

See also

- Washington Township (disambiguation)
