= Washington Township, Arkansas =

Washington Township, Arkansas may refer to:

- Washington Township, Benton County, Arkansas (historical)
- Washington Township, Boone County, Arkansas (historical)
- Washington Township, Bradley County, Arkansas
- Washington Township, Conway County, Arkansas
- Washington Township, Fulton County, Arkansas
- Washington Township, Grant County, Arkansas
- Washington Township, Independence County, Arkansas
- Washington Township, Jefferson County, Arkansas
- Washington Township, Ouachita County, Arkansas
- Washington Township, Sevier County, Arkansas
- Washington Township, Sharp County, Arkansas
- Washington Township, Stone County, Arkansas
- Washington Township, Van Buren County, Arkansas

== See also ==
- List of townships in Arkansas
- Washington Township (disambiguation)
