= Washington Township, Illinois =

Washington Township is the name of three townships in Illinois:

- Washington Township, Carroll County, Illinois
- Washington Township, Tazewell County, Illinois
- Washington Township, Will County, Illinois

See also

- Washington Township (disambiguation)
