= Washington Township =

Washington Township may refer to:

- Washington Township, Arkansas (disambiguation)
- Washington Township, Alameda County, California, a former township
- Washington Township, Illinois (disambiguation)
- Washington Township, Indiana (disambiguation)
- Washington Township, Iowa (disambiguation)
- Washington Township, Kansas (disambiguation)
- Washington Township, Michigan (disambiguation)
- Washington Township, Le Sueur County, Minnesota
- Washington Township, Missouri (disambiguation)
- Washington Township, Nebraska (disambiguation)
- Washington Township, New Jersey (disambiguation)
- Washington Township, North Carolina (disambiguation)
- Washington Township in Grand Forks County, North Dakota
- Washington Township, Ohio (disambiguation)
- Washington Township, Oklahoma (disambiguation)
- Washington Township, Pennsylvania (disambiguation)
- Washington Township, South Dakota (disambiguation)

== See also ==
- List of places named for George Washington
- Washington (disambiguation)
