= Washington County High School (Alabama) =

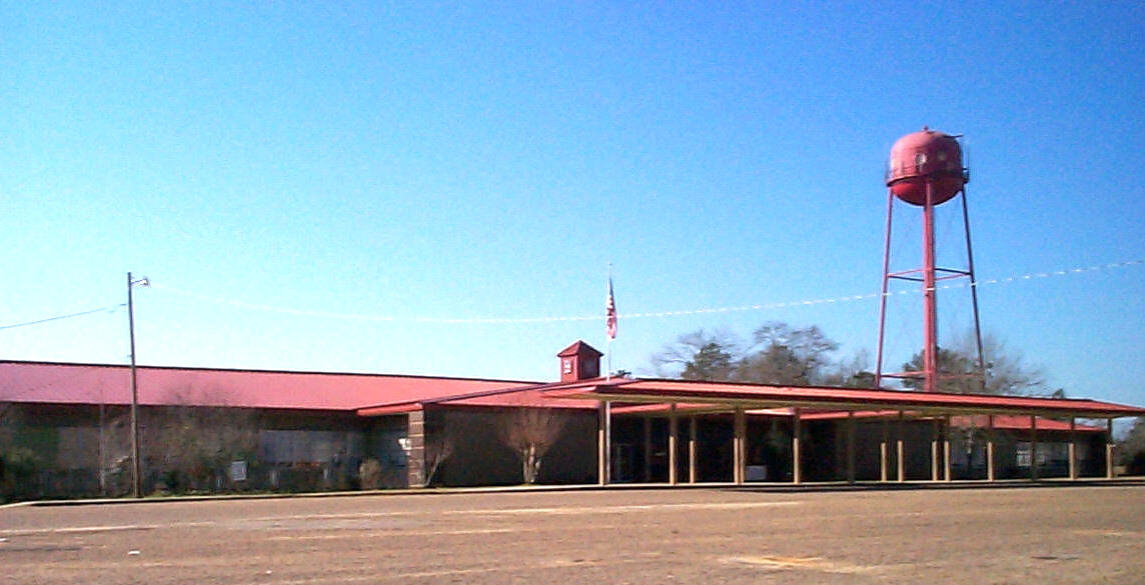
- Washington County High School campus in Chatom, Alabama

Location
- 1 School Street; Chatom, Alabama 36518; United States; 31°27′40″N 85°15′02″W

Information
- School type: Public High School
- Established: 1915 (111 years ago)
- School board: Washington County Board of Education
- School district: Washington County School District
- Superintendent: Curtis Kirkland
- CEEB code: 010645
- Principal: Dirk Dykstra
- Teaching staff: 54.20 (on an FTE basis)
- Grades: 5-12
- Gender: Co-education
- Age range: 10-19
- Enrollment: 905 (2024-2025)
- Average class size: ~19
- Student to teacher ratio: 16.70
- Hours in school day: 10
- Classrooms: 30
- Colors: Maroon and gold
- Song: Alma Mater
- Fight song: "Hail WCHS"
- Athletics conference: AHSAA, Class 2A
- Sports: Baseball, Basketball, Football, Softball, Volleyball, Golf, Track, Soccer
- Mascot: Bulldog
- Team name: Bulldogs, Lady Dawgs
- Rival: Millry High School
- Publication: Herff Jones
- Newspaper: The Bulldog
- Yearbook: "The Washtonian"
- Communities served: Hobson, Millry, Howardtown, Yarbo, Tibbie, Seaboard, Laton Hill, Bigbee, Springhill, Rutan
- Website: www.wcbek12.org/schools/washington-county-high-school

Washington County High School, or WCHS, is a 2A high school in Chatom, Alabama. The campus is also the site of Chatom Middle School, which is grades 5-8. It is the largest school in Washington County, with 184 students enrolled in the high school as of 2018.

Beginning with the 2012-2013 school year, dual enrollment classes were introduced to Juniors and Seniors in the high school

== Athletics ==
- Football
- Girls & Boys Cross Country
- Volleyball
- Golf
- Tennis
- Basketball
- Soccer
- Wrestling
- Cheer
- Baseball
- Softball
- Track & Field

== Academics ==
In 2012, WCHS began a new, in house, dual enrollment system for juniors and seniors who wished to take part in it. Partnering with the University of West Alabama, these students were able to receive high school and college credits in classes such as English 101 and 102, Speech 101 and then eventually American literature classes. WCHS became the first school in its school system to offer such a program. This dual enrollment program still exists today as WCHS now works with Coastal Alabama Community College.

== Notable alumni ==
- Rusty Jackson, former NFL punter
