= Fort Washington =

Fort Washington may refer to:

== Events ==
- Battle of Fort Washington, during the American Revolutionary War

== Places in the United States ==
=== New York City, New York ===
- Fort Washington Avenue, Manhattan
- Fort Washington (Manhattan), former American Revolutionary War-era fort in Manhattan
- Fort Washington Park (New York City), 160-acre park in Manhattan

=== Elsewhere ===
- Fort Washington, California, a census-designated place
- Fort Washington, Maryland, a census-designated place
- Fort Washington (Massachusetts), an American Revolutionary War-era earthworks in Cambridge, Massachusetts, near MIT
- Fort Washington, a sub-post of Fort Adams, Mississippi, near Washington in the Mississippi Territory
- Fort Washington (Ohio), former frontier outpost in Cincinnati
- Fort Washington Way, an expressway that carries Interstate 71 and US Route 50 in downtown Cincinnati, Ohio
- Fort Washington, Pennsylvania, a census-designated place
  - Fort Washington station, railway station in the CDP
- Fort Washington State Park, state park in Pennsylvania
- Fort Washington Park, a historic fort that guarded Washington, DC

== See also ==
- Port Washington (disambiguation)
- The Saint of Fort Washington, a film
