= Washington Academy =

Washington Academy may refer to:

- Washington Academy (Maine), a preparatory high school in East Machias, Maine, United States
- Washington Academy, Sunderland, a secondary school in the City of Sunderland, Tyne and Wear, England

== See also ==
- Washington College Academy
- Washington (disambiguation)
