= Washingtonian =

Washingtonian may to refer to people from:

- Washington (state)
  - List of people from Washington (state)
- Washington, D.C.
  - List of people from Washington, D.C.

Washingtonian may also refer to:

- Washingtonian (Amtrak train), a former Amtrak service
- Washingtonian (B&O train), a named passenger train of the Baltimore and Ohio Railroad in the 1930s–1950s
- Washingtonian (magazine), a cultural magazine in Washington, D.C.
- Washingtonian movement, a 19th-century temperance movement in the United States
- "The Washingtonians" (2007), Masters of Horror episode
- SS Washingtonian, a cargo ship launched in 1913
- The Washingtonians, a band formed by Duke Ellington

== See also ==
- Washington (disambiguation)
