= Washington Township, South Dakota =

Washington Township is the name of given to 3 active and 5 defunct townships in the U.S. state of South Dakota:

== Active townships ==
- Washington Township, Aurora County, South Dakota
- Washington Township, Clark County, South Dakota
- Washington Township, Douglas County, South Dakota

== Defunct townships ==
- Washington Township, Bon Homme County, South Dakota
- Washington Township, Charles Mix County, South Dakota
- Washington Township, Hyde County, South Dakota
- Washington Township, Jones County, South Dakota
- Washington Township, McPherson County, South Dakota

See also

- Washington Township (disambiguation)
