= Washington Township, Missouri =

Washington Township is the name of twenty-eight townships in Missouri:

- Washington Township, Buchanan County, Missouri
- Washington Township, Carroll County, Missouri
- Washington Township, Cedar County, Missouri
- Washington Township, Clark County, Missouri
- Washington Township, Clay County, Missouri
- Washington Township, Dade County, Missouri
- Washington Township, Dallas County, Missouri
- Washington Township, Daviess County, Missouri
- Washington Township, DeKalb County, Missouri
- Washington Township, Douglas County, Missouri
- Washington Township, Franklin County, Missouri
- Washington Township, Greene County, Missouri
- Washington Township, Grundy County, Missouri
- Washington Township, Harrison County, Missouri
- Washington Township, Jackson County, Missouri
- Washington Township, Johnson County, Missouri
- Washington Township, Laclede County, Missouri
- Washington Township, Lafayette County, Missouri
- Washington Township, Mercer County, Missouri
- Washington Township, Monroe County, Missouri
- Washington Township, Nodaway County, Missouri
- Washington Township, Osage County, Missouri
- Washington Township, Pettis County, Missouri
- Washington Township, Ripley County, Missouri
- Washington Township, St. Clair County, Missouri
- Washington Township, Stone County, Missouri
- Washington Township, Vernon County, Missouri
- Washington Township, Webster County, Missouri

See also

- Washington Township (disambiguation)
