= Washington Township, Iowa =

Washington Township is the name of forty-nine townships in Iowa:

- Washington Township, Adair County, Iowa
- Washington Township, Adams County, Iowa
- Washington Township, Appanoose County, Iowa
- Washington Township, Black Hawk County, Iowa
- Washington Township, Bremer County, Iowa
- Washington Township, Buchanan County, Iowa
- Washington Township, Buena Vista County, Iowa
- Washington Township, Butler County, Iowa
- Washington Township, Carroll County, Iowa
- Washington Township, Cass County, Iowa
- Washington Township, Chickasaw County, Iowa
- Washington Township, Clarke County, Iowa
- Washington Township, Clinton County, Iowa
- Washington Township, Crawford County, Iowa
- Washington Township, Dallas County, Iowa
- Washington Township, Des Moines County, Iowa
- Washington Township, Dubuque County, Iowa
- Washington Township, Fremont County, Iowa
- Washington Township, Greene County, Iowa
- Washington Township, Grundy County, Iowa
- Washington Township, Harrison County, Iowa
- Washington Township, Iowa County, Iowa
- Washington Township, Jackson County, Iowa
- Washington Township, Jasper County, Iowa
- Washington Township, Johnson County, Iowa
- Washington Township, Jones County, Iowa
- Washington Township, Keokuk County, Iowa
- Washington Township, Lee County, Iowa
- Washington Township, Linn County, Iowa
- Washington Township, Lucas County, Iowa
- Washington Township, Marion County, Iowa
- Washington Township, Marshall County, Iowa
- Washington Township, Montgomery County, Iowa
- Washington Township, Page County, Iowa
- Washington Township, Plymouth County, Iowa
- Washington Township, Polk County, Iowa
- Washington Township, Pottawattamie County, Iowa
- Washington Township, Poweshiek County, Iowa
- Washington Township, Ringgold County, Iowa
- Washington Township, Shelby County, Iowa
- Washington Township, Sioux County, Iowa
- Washington Township, Story County, Iowa
- Washington Township, Taylor County, Iowa
- Washington Township, Van Buren County, Iowa
- Washington Township, Wapello County, Iowa
- Washington Township, Washington County, Iowa
- Washington Township, Wayne County, Iowa
- Washington Township, Webster County, Iowa
- Washington Township, Winneshiek County, Iowa

See also

- Washington Township (disambiguation)
