= McIntosh High School (Alabama) =

Location
- 7010 Highway 43; McIntosh, Washington County, Alabama 36553; 31°15′17″N 88°01′34″W

Information
- School type: Public
- School board: Washington County Board of Education
- School district: Washington County School District
- NCES School ID: 010348001338
- Principal: Jamelle Sauls
- Teaching staff: 10.00 (on an FTE basis)
- Grades: 6–12
- Enrollment: 183 (2023–2024)
- Student to teacher ratio: 18.30
- Colors: Navy blue , White and Gold
- Mascot: Demons
- Website: www.wcbek12.org/schools/mcintosh-high-school

McIntosh High School is a public high school in Washington County, Alabama. It is part of the Washington County School District (Alabama). McIntosh is a small town and the area's economy is largely agricultural and forestry product based.

== History ==
A Native American testified about discrimination and efforts to preserve his culture in the community. He met with the school's principal to pursue organization of a special program for tribe members.

In 2001, the Demons mascot was removed following a complaint from a pastor. It was later restored following a lawsuit.

== Background ==
In 2023, the majority of students were documented as economically disadvantaged. 63.4 percent were black, 19.4 percent Native American, and 14.3 percent white, 1.1 percent Asian, 1.1 percent two or more "races" and .6 percent Hispanic. Test scores are below the district and state averages.

Demons are the school mascot. The school colors are navy blue, white, and gold.

In 2017, it was reported to be one of the 20 high schools in Alabama with the lowest ACT scores.

The football team plays at H. H. Wiggins Field. Although it won regional championships in 1976 and 1984, it has never won a state championship.
