= Booker T. Washington Community Center =

Community center in Virginia, US

- Booker T. Washington High School
- U.S. National Register of Historic Places
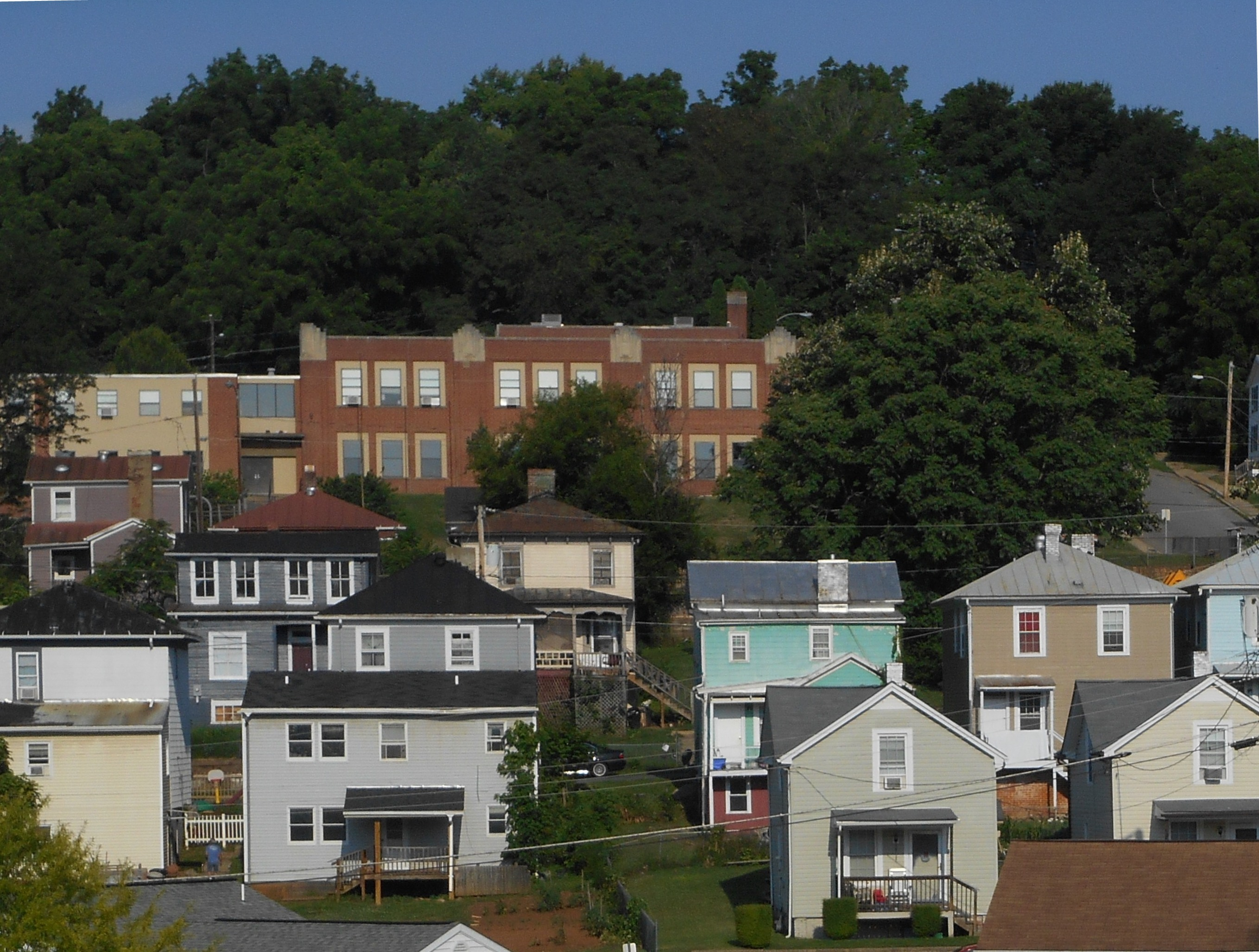
- Former Booker T. Washington High School, seen from S. Jefferson St.

- Location within Virginia Location within the United States
- Location: 1114 West Johnson Street, Staunton, Virginia
- Coordinates: 38°8′52″N 79°4′53″W
- Area: 2.3 acres (0.93 ha)
- Built: 1936
- Architect: Raymond V. Long
- Architectural style: Art Deco
- NRHP reference No.: 14000550
- Added to NRHP: September 3, 2014

The Booker T. Washington Community Center is a community center at 1114 West Johnson Street in Staunton, Virginia. It is located in the former Booker T. Washington High School for Coloreds, a two-story Art Deco brick building designed by Raymond V. Long and built in 1936. A 1960 addition to the rear of the building has a more Modern treatment. It was the Staunton area's only high school for African-American students for thirty years, and one of its few meeting points for African-American organizations until the city's public facilities were integrated. The school was closed in 1966, and was used by the Staunton Police Department from 1967 to 1986.

The building was listed on the National Register of Historic Places in 2014.

== See also ==
- List of things named after Booker T. Washington
- National Register of Historic Places listings in Staunton, Virginia
