= Washington Township, Kansas =

Washington Township is the name of fourteen townships in Kansas:

- Washington Township, Anderson County, Kansas
- Washington Township, Brown County, Kansas
- Washington Township, Chautauqua County, Kansas
- Washington Township, Crawford County, Kansas
- Washington Township, Doniphan County, Kansas
- Washington Township, Jackson County, Kansas
- Washington Township, Jewell County, Kansas
- Washington Township, Nemaha County, Kansas
- Washington Township, Republic County, Kansas
- Washington Township, Saline County, Kansas
- Washington Township, Sherman County, Kansas
- Washington Township, Smith County, Kansas
- Washington Township, Wabaunsee County, Kansas
- Washington Township, Washington County, Kansas

See also

- Washington Township (disambiguation)
