= Washington Township, Indiana =

Washington Township is the name of forty-six townships in Indiana:

- Washington Township, Adams County, Indiana
- Washington Township, Allen County, Indiana
- Washington Township, Blackford County, Indiana
- Washington Township, Boone County, Indiana
- Washington Township, Brown County, Indiana
- Washington Township, Carroll County, Indiana
- Washington Township, Cass County, Indiana
- Washington Township, Clark County, Indiana
- Washington Township, Clay County, Indiana
- Washington Township, Clinton County, Indiana
- Washington Township, Daviess County, Indiana
- Washington Township, Dearborn County, Indiana
- Washington Township, Decatur County, Indiana
- Washington Township, Delaware County, Indiana
- Washington Township, Elkhart County, Indiana
- Washington Township, Gibson County, Indiana
- Washington Township, Grant County, Indiana
- Washington Township, Greene County, Indiana
- Washington Township, Hamilton County, Indiana
- Washington Township, Harrison County, Indiana
- Washington Township, Hendricks County, Indiana
- Washington Township, Jackson County, Indiana
- Washington Township, Knox County, Indiana
- Washington Township, Kosciusko County, Indiana
- Washington Township, LaPorte County, Indiana
- Washington Township, Marion County, Indiana
- Washington Township, Miami County, Indiana
- Washington Township, Monroe County, Indiana
- Washington Township, Morgan County, Indiana
- Washington Township, Newton County, Indiana
- Washington Township, Noble County, Indiana
- Washington Township, Owen County, Indiana
- Washington Township, Parke County, Indiana
- Washington Township, Pike County, Indiana
- Washington Township, Porter County, Indiana
- Washington Township, Putnam County, Indiana
- Washington Township, Randolph County, Indiana
- Washington Township, Ripley County, Indiana
- Washington Township, Rush County, Indiana
- Washington Township, Shelby County, Indiana
- Washington Township, Starke County, Indiana
- Washington Township, Tippecanoe County, Indiana
- Washington Township, Warren County, Indiana
- Washington Township, Washington County, Indiana
- Washington Township, Wayne County, Indiana
- Washington Township, Whitley County, Indiana

See also

- Washington Township (disambiguation)
