= Washington Street Historic District =

Washington Street Historic District may refer to:
(sorted by state, then city/town)

- North Washington Street Historic District (Hope, Arkansas), listed on the National Register of Historic Places (NRHP) in Hempstead County
- Washington Street Historic District (Camden, Arkansas), NRHP-listed in Ouachita County
- Washington Street Historic District (Middletown, Connecticut), NRHP-listed in Middlesex County
- South Washington Street Historic District (Clarkesville, Georgia), NRHP-listed in Habersham County
- North Washington Street Historic District (Bloomington, Indiana), NRHP-listed in Monroe County
- East Washington Street Historic District (Martinsville, Indiana), NRHP-listed in Morgan County
- East Washington Street Historic District (South Bend, Indiana), NRHP-listed in St. Joseph County
- Washington Street Historic District (Valparaiso, Indiana), NRHP-listed in Porter County
- Washington Street and East 22nd Street Historic District, Dubuque, Iowa, NRHP-listed in Dubuque County
- Washington Street Historic District (Cumberland, Maryland), NRHP-listed in Allegany County
- South Washington Street Historic District (North Attleborough, Massachusetts), NRHP-listed in Bristol County
- Washington Street Historic District (Peabody, Massachusetts), NRHP-listed in Essex County
- Washington Street Historic District (Bay St. Louis, Mississippi), NRHP-listed in Hancock County
- Washington Street Historic District (High Point, North Carolina), NRHP-listed in Guilford County
- North Washington Street Historic District (Tullahoma, Tennessee), NRHP-listed in Coffee County
- Washington Street Historic District (Dayton, Washington), NRHP-listed in Columbia County
- Washington Street Historic District (Menasha, Wisconsin), NRHP-listed in Winnebago County
- South Washington Street Historic District (Watertown, Wisconsin), NRHP-listed in Jefferson County

== See also ==
- Washington Street (disambiguation)
- Washington Avenue Historic District (disambiguation)
- Washington Historic District (disambiguation)
