= Washington County High School =

Washington County High School may refer to any of the following United States educational institutions:

- Washington County High School (Alabama) in Chatom, Alabama
- Washington County High School (Georgia) in Sandersville, Georgia
- Washington County High School (Kentucky) in Springfield, Kentucky

== See also ==
- Booker T. Washington High School (disambiguation)
- George Washington High School (disambiguation)
- Washington High School (disambiguation)
