= Washington County School District (Alabama) =

School district in Alabama

Address
- 229 Granade Avenue Chatom, Alabama, 36518; United States

District information
- Type: Public
- Grades: PreK–12
- NCES District ID: 0103480

Students and staff
- Students: 2,612
- Teachers: 156.42
- Staff: 178.25
- Student–teacher ratio: 16.7

Other information
- Website: wcbek12.org

Washington County School District is a school district headquartered in Chatom, Alabama, serving Washington County.

== Schools ==
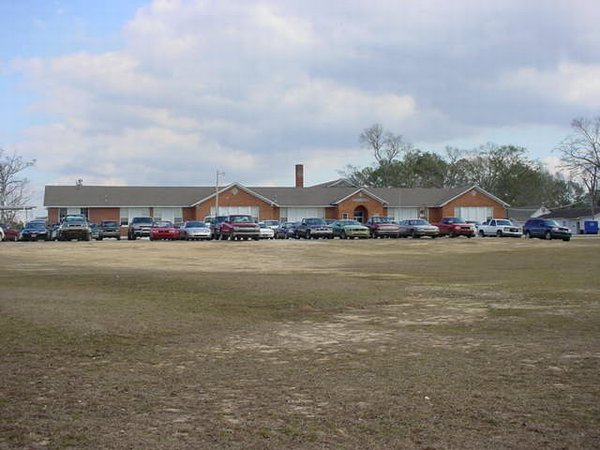
Fruitdale High School

=== K-12 ===
- Fruitdale High School
- Leroy High School
- Millry High School

=== High schools ===
- McIntosh High School
- Washington County High School

Millry High School is in Washington County, Alabama. Its football team was established in 1927. Wildcats are the school mascot. The football team plays on A.D. Britton Field. The school colors are green and white. Shane Hendry is the football team's coach.

In 2022 the school enrolled 166 students. 82 percent were white and 13 percent black. The school is at 1 Wildcat Drive.

=== Elementary schools ===
- Chatom Elementary School
- McIntosh Elementary School

=== Other ===
- Washington County Career Technical Center

== See also ==
- List of high schools in Alabama
