= Washington Township, North Carolina =

Washington Township is the name of two townships in North Carolina:

- Washington Township, Beaufort County, North Carolina
- Washington Township, Guilford County, North Carolina

See also

- Washington Township (disambiguation)
