= Fruitdale, Alabama =

- Census-designated place
- Location of Fruitdale in Washington County, Alabama.
- Coordinates: 31°20′34″N 88°24′39″W
- Country: United States
- State: Alabama
- County: Washington

Area
  - Total: 4.49 sq mi (11.63 km^{2})
  - Land: 4.47 sq mi (11.59 km^{2})
  - Water: 0.015 sq mi (0.04 km^{2})
- Elevation: 197 ft (60 m)

Population (2020)
  - Total: 175
  - Density: 39/sq mi (15.1/km^{2})
- Time zone: UTC-6 (Central (CST))
  - Summer (DST): UTC-5 (CDT)
- ZIP code: 36539
- Area code: 251
- GNIS feature ID: 2628591

Fruitdale is a census-designated place and unincorporated community in Washington County, Alabama, United States. As of the 2020 census, Fruitdale had a population of 175. Fruitdale High School serves K-12 students in the area. In November 2022, the town was struck by an EF3 Tornado.

== History ==
In 1854, the Mobile and Ohio Railroad laid track and built a train station in Fruitdale.

== Demographics ==
Historical population
Census	Pop.	Note	%±
2010	185		—
2020	175		−5.4%
U.S. Decennial Census

Fruitdale was first listed as a census designated place in the 2010 U.S. census.

Fruitdale CDP, Alabama – Racial and ethnic composition Note: the US Census treats Hispanic/Latino as an ethnic category. This table excludes Latinos from the racial categories and assigns them to a separate category. Hispanics/Latinos may be of any race.
Race / Ethnicity (NH = Non-Hispanic)	Pop 2010	Pop 2020	% 2010	% 2020
White alone (NH)	130	123	70.27%	70.29%
Black or African American alone (NH)	51	31	27.57%	17.71%
Native American or Alaska Native alone (NH)	0	3	0.00%	1.71%
Asian alone (NH)	0	0	0.00%	0.00%
Native Hawaiian or Pacific Islander alone (NH)	0	0	0.00%	0.00%
Other race alone (NH)	0	2	0.00%	1.14%
Mixed race or Multiracial (NH)	1	9	0.54%	5.14%
Hispanic or Latino (any race)	3	7	1.62%	4.00%
Total	185	175	100.00%	100.00%

=== 2010 census ===
As of the 2010 United States census, there were 185 people living in the CDP. The racial makeup of the CDP was 70.3% White, 27.6% Black and 0.5% from two or more races. 1.6% were Hispanic or Latino of any race.
