= School Street School (Taunton, Massachusetts) =

- U.S. National Register of Historic Places
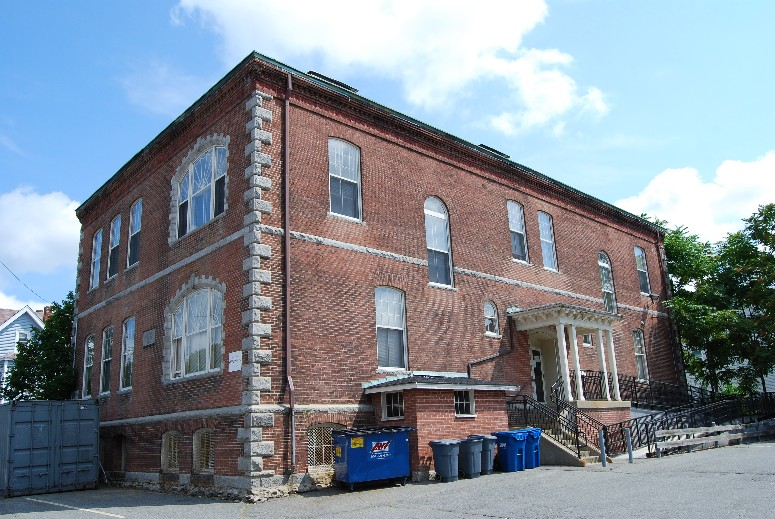

- Location within Massachusetts Location within the United States
- Location: Taunton, Massachusetts
- Coordinates: 41°54′12″N 71°6′3″W
- Built: 1897
- Architect: Smith, Gustavus L.; Williams, F.D.
- Architectural style: Colonial Revival
- MPS: Taunton MRA
- NRHP reference No.: 84002214
- Added to NRHP: July 5, 1984

The School Street School is an historic school building at School and Fruit Streets in Taunton, Massachusetts. The school was designed by Gustavus L. Smith and built in 1896–97. The school's design is similar to that of two other Smith-designed schools in Taunton, Leonard School and Washington School; these schools are all two-story brick buildings with hip roofs. The School Street School was designed in the Georgian Revival style, which can be seen in its windows and corner quoins. The school served Taunton's large Portuguese immigrant population and was the only school in the city to offer instruction in the immigrants' native Portuguese.

The School Street School was added to the National Register of Historic Places on July 5, 1984.

== See also ==
- National Register of Historic Places listings in Taunton, Massachusetts
