= Washington Township, New Jersey =

Washington Township is the current or former name of six municipalities in the U.S. state of New Jersey:

- Washington Township, Bergen County, New Jersey
- Washington Township, Burlington County, New Jersey
- Washington Township, Gloucester County, New Jersey
- Washington Township, Morris County, New Jersey
- Washington Township, Warren County, New Jersey
- Robbinsville Township, New Jersey, known as Washington Township until 2008

== See also ==
- Washington, New Jersey, Warren County
- Washington Township (disambiguation)
