= Fruitdale High School =

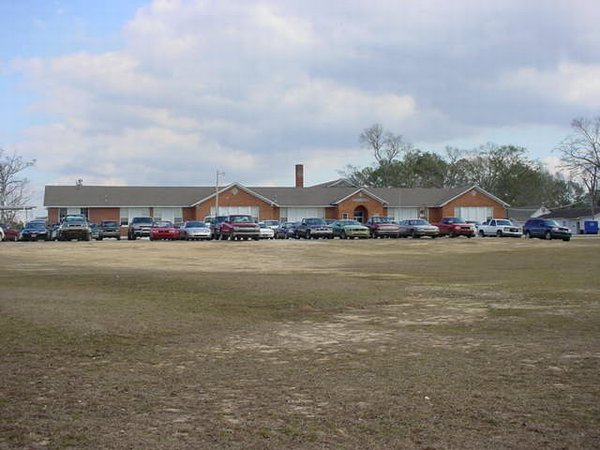
- Fruitdale Hall (Main Building)

Location
- 13077 County Rd 1 Fruitdale, Alabama 36539; United States
- 31°20′39″N 88°24′20″W

Information
- School type: Public High School
- School board: Washington County School Board of Education
- School district: Washington County School District
- Superintendent: Curtis Kirkland
- CEEB code: 011175
- Principal: Curt Stagner
- Teaching staff: 23.00 (FTE)
- Grades: K-12
- Gender: Co-education
- Average class size: ~35-40
- Student to teacher ratio: 14.96
- Colors: Purple and white
- Slogan: "Preparing for school, for the community, and for the world"
- Athletics: Baseball, Basketball, Football, Softball, Volleyball, Cheerleading, Marching Band, Concert Band
- Athletics conference: AHSAA, Class 1A Region 1
- Mascot: Pirates
- Newspaper: The Pirate Press
- Website: www.wcbek12.org/schools/fruitdale-high-school

Fruitdale High School (FHS), is a small 1A high school in Fruitdale, Alabama. The school teaches grades pre-K-12. The school's colors are purple and white. The school mascot is the pirate. The school is a part of the public school system in Washington County, Alabama.

== Proximity ==
Fruitdale High School is located roughly 60 miles north of Mobile, Alabama, and is 5 miles east of State Line, Mississippi.

== School pictures ==
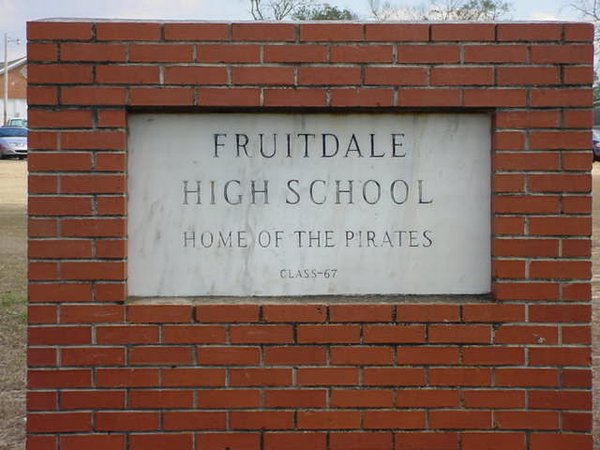
The Welcome Sign

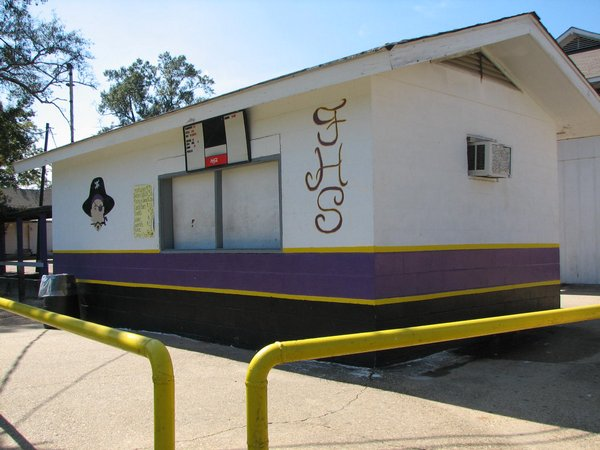
The Break Stand
