= Hezekiah Flinn =

American politician

Hezekiah Flinn was a member of the Wisconsin State Assembly.

== Biography ==
Flinn was born on March 7, 1825, in Leesville, Indiana. He died in 1892.

== Career ==
Flinn was a member of the Assembly during the 1877, 1878 and 1879 sessions. Additionally, he was elected Mayor of Watertown, Wisconsin, in 1873 and 1874 and as an alderman (city councilman) in 1877. He was a Democrat.
