= Washington Island =

The name Washington Island refers to:

- Washington Island (Wisconsin), the largest of the islands that make up the Town of Washington in Door County, Wisconsin
- Washington Island (Michigan) in Keweenaw County, Michigan
- Washington Island (Minnesota) in Lake County, Minnesota
- Washington Island (New York) in Jefferson County, New York
- Teraina, also known as Washington Island, Kiribati
- Washington Islands Wilderness in Washington state
- An 18th-century name for Ua Huka, later extended as the "Washington Islands" to include all of the northern Marquesas Islands
