= Booker T. Washington School (Rushville, Indiana) =

- U.S. National Register of Historic Places
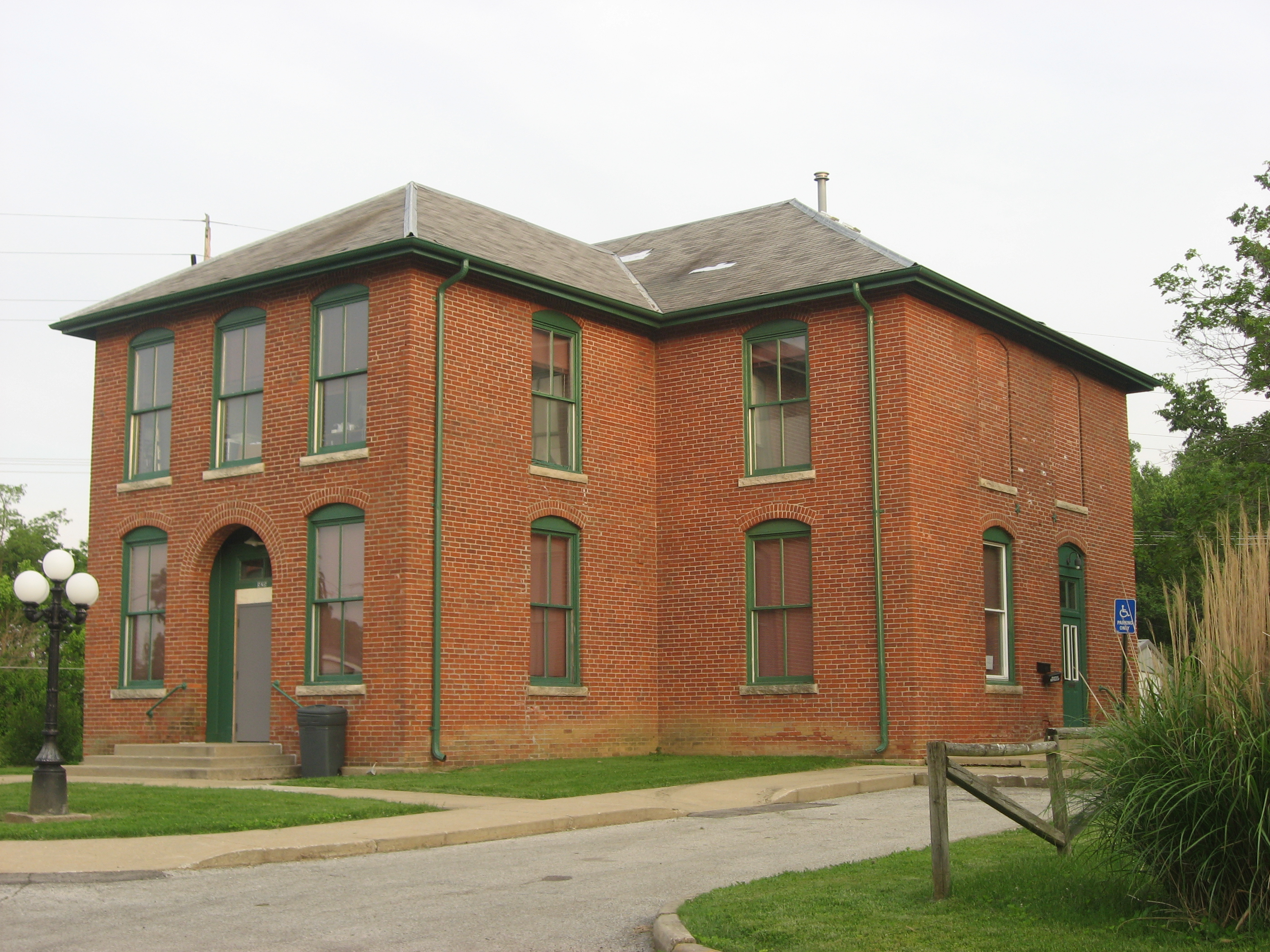
- Booker T. Washington School, May 2011

- Location within Indiana Location within the United States
- Location: 525 E. Seventh St., Rushville, Indiana
- Coordinates: 39°36′53″N 85°26′12″W
- Area: less than one acre
- Built: 1905
- Architect: Winship, Morris
- Architectural style: Romanesque, T-Plan
- NRHP reference No.: 90000809
- Added to NRHP: May 24, 1990

Booker T. Washington School is a historic school building located at Rushville, Indiana. It was built in 1905, and is a two-story, "T"-plan, vernacular brick building with Romanesque Revival style design elements. It has a low-pitched hipped roof and features round and segmental arched openings. The building served as the focal point for the African-American community of Rushville.It is currently being used as a neighborhood community center and is home of the local Head Start program.

It was listed on the National Register of Historic Places in 1990.

== See also ==
- List of things named after Booker T. Washington
