= Washington Bridge =

Washington Bridge may refer to:

- New York:
  - Washington Bridge (Harlem River), arch bridge between the Bronx and Manhattan in New York City
  - George Washington Bridge, suspension bridge over the Hudson River connecting New York City to Fort Lee, New Jersey
    - George Washington Bridge Bus Station, New York City
- Washington Bridge (Connecticut), drawbridge over the Housatonic River connecting Milford and Stratford, Connecticut
- Washington Bridge (Washington, Missouri), bridge over the Missouri River
- Washington Bridge (Providence, Rhode Island), series of three bridges over the Seekonk River connecting Providence to East Providence, Rhode Island
- George Washington Memorial Bridge or Aurora Bridge, Seattle, Washington

== See also ==
- Washington Avenue Bridge (disambiguation)
- Washington Street Bridge (Brainerd, Minnesota)
- Washington Crossing Bridge, bridge over the Delaware River connecting Titusville, New Jersey to Washington Crossing, Pennsylvania
- Washington Crossing Bridge (Pittsburgh), bridge over the Allegheny River connecting Pittsburgh and Millvale, Pennsylvania
- George Washington Bridges (1825–1873), U.S. politician
- G. W. Bridge, comic book character
