= Washington State =

Washington State may refer to:

- Washington (state), a U.S. state, often referred to as "Washington state" to distinguish it from the American capital city, Washington, D.C.
- Washington State University, a land-grant college located in the state of Washington
- Washington State Cougars, the athletic program of Washington State University

== See also ==
- Washington station (CTA Red Line), a closed subway station on the Chicago Transit Authority's Red Line
- State of Washington (sternwheeler), steamboat
