= Washington School =

Washington School may refer to:

== Argentina ==
- Washington School, Buenos Aires, Argentina

== United States ==
(sorted by state, then city/town)

- Washington School (Eureka, California), listed on the National Register of Historic Places (NRHP) in Humboldt County
- Washington School (New Britain, Connecticut), listed on the NRHP in Hartford County
- Washington School (Logansport, Indiana)
- Washington School (Taunton, Massachusetts), listed on the NRHP in Bristol County
- Washington School (Weymouth, Massachusetts), listed on the NRHP in Norfolk County
- Washington School (Mississippi), in Greenville, Mississippi
- Washington School (Monroe City, Missouri), listed on the NRHP in Monroe County
- Washington School (North Las Vegas, Nevada), listed on the NRHP in Clark County
- Washington School (Ossining, New York), listed on the NRHP in Westchester County
- Washington School (Grand Forks, North Dakota), listed on the NRHP in Grand Forks County
- Washington School (Washington Court House, Ohio), listed on the NRHP in Fayette County
- Washington School (Drumright, Oklahoma), listed on the NRHP in Creek County
- Washington School (Madison, South Dakota), listed on the NRHP in Lake County
- Washington School (Park City, Utah), listed on the NRHP in Summit County
- Washington School (Washington, Utah), listed on the NRHP in Washington County
- Washington School (Washington, Virginia) listed in NRHP in Rappahannock County
- Washington School (Tacoma, Washington), listed on the NRHP in Pierce County
- Washington School (Walla Walla, Washington), listed on the NRHP in Walla Walla County
- Washington School (Appleton, Wisconsin), listed on the NRHP in Outagamie County

== See also ==
- Washington (disambiguation)
- Washington Academy (disambiguation)
- Washington School District (disambiguation)
