= Manitowoc Post =

The Manitowoc Post was a German language weekly newspaper with some items in English, published primarily in Manitowoc, Wisconsin from July 2, 1881 to November 29, 1924.

It was founded by A. Wittman in Manitowoc. From July 8, 1897-January 9, 1914, it was called the Two Rivers Post before reverting to its original name. From January 6, 1923 until it ceased publication, it was also published in Winona, Minnesota, home of the related Westlicher Herold.
