= Washington High School =

Washington High School may refer to:

- Washington High School (Arizona), in Phoenix, Arizona
- Washington High School (Fremont, California)
- Washington Union High School, in Fresno, California
- Washington Preparatory High School, in Los Angeles, California
- Washington High School (Georgia), in Atlanta, Georgia
- Washington High School (East Chicago, Indiana)
- Washington High School (South Bend, Indiana)
- Washington High School (Washington, Indiana)
- Washington High School (Cedar Rapids, Iowa)
- Washington High School (Cherokee, Iowa)
- Washington High School (Washington, Iowa)
- Washington High School (Kansas), in Kansas City, Kansas
- Washington High School (Maryland), in Princess Anne, Maryland
- Washington High School (Missouri), in Washington, Missouri
- Washington High School (New Jersey), a defunct school in Washington, New Jersey
- Washington High School in Washington, North Carolina, part of Beaufort County Schools (North Carolina)
- Washington Graded and High School, a historic African-American school, now an elementary magnet school in Raleigh, North Carolina
- Washington High School (Washington Court House, Ohio), in Washington Court House, Ohio
- Washington High School (Oklahoma), in Washington, Oklahoma
- Washington High School (Oregon), in Portland, Oregon
- Washington School District (Pennsylvania)
- Washington High School (Sioux Falls, South Dakota)
- Washington High School (Utah), in Ogden, Utah
- Washington High School (Parkland, Washington)
- Washington High School (West Virginia), in Charles Town, West Virginia
- Washington High School (Milwaukee, Wisconsin)
- Washington High School (Two Rivers, Wisconsin)

== See also ==
- George Washington High School (disambiguation)
- Booker T. Washington High School (disambiguation)
- Washington County High School (disambiguation)
- Lake Washington High School in Kirkland, Washington
