= Washington Avenue Historic District =

Washington Avenue Historic District may refer to the following places in the United States:

- West Washington Avenue Historic District, Jonesboro, Arkansas, listed on the National Register of Historic Places (NRHP) in Craighead County
- Washington Avenue Historic District (Marietta, Georgia), listed on the NRHP in Cobb County, Georgia
- Washington Avenue Historic District (Evansville, Indiana), NRHP-listed
- Washington Avenue-Main Street Historic District, Greenville, Mississippi, listed on the NRHP in Washington, County Mississippi
- Washington Avenue Historic District (St. Louis, Missouri), NRHP-listed
- Washington Avenue: East of Tucker District, St. Louis, Missouri, listed on the NRHP in Downtown and Downtown West St. Louis, Missouri
- Washington Avenue Historic District (Elyria, Ohio), listed on the NRHP in Lorain County, Ohio
- Washington Avenue Historic District (Philadelphia), Pennsylvania, NRHP-listed
- Washington Avenue and Florida Avenue Historic District, Union City, Tennessee, listed on the NRHP in Obion County, Tennessee
- Washington Avenue Historic District (Fredericksburg, Virginia), NRHP-listed
- Parkersburg High School-Washington Avenue Historic District, Parkersburg, West Virginia, NRHP-listed
- Washington Avenue Historic District (Cedarburg, Wisconsin), NRHP-listed
- Washington Avenue Historic District (Oshkosh, Wisconsin), listed on the NRHP in Winnebago County, Wisconsin

== See also ==
- Washington Avenue (disambiguation)
- Washington Street Historic District (disambiguation)
- Washington Historic District (disambiguation)
