= Washington Valley =

Washington Valley may refer to:

== Places ==
=== United States ===
- Washington Valley, New Jersey, an unincorporated community in Morris County, New Jersey
  - Washington Valley Historic District, in Washington Valley, New Jersey
  - Washington Valley Schoolhouse, a historic building in Washington Valley, New Jersey
- Washington Valley (Middle Brook basin), a valley between the first and second Watchung mountains in Somerset County, New Jersey
  - Washington Valley Park, a public park in the Washington Valley, Somerset County, New Jersey

=== Elsewhere ===
- Washington Valley, New Zealand, a major inner suburb of Nelson, New Zealand
