= Booker T. Washington Public Charter School =

Coordinates: 38.9203°N 77.0312°W

Booker T. Washington Public Charter School(BTWPCS)

Location
- 1346 Florida Avenue, NW; Washington, D.C. United States

Information
- Type: Secondary Schools
- Established: August 1999
- Closed: June 2014
- School district: DCPS
- Grades: 9–12
- Enrollment: 250
- Campus: Urban
- Colors: Blue and gold
- Mascot: Warriors
- School hours: 8:25 AM to 3:32 PM
- Average class size: 16
- Website: btwschool.org

Booker T. Washington Public Charter School was a 501c3 non-profit charter high school chartered by the District of Columbia Public Schools. It operated from 1999 to 2014

The Booker T. Washington Public Charter School opened for the 1999-2000 school year at 1346 Florida Avenue, NW. It was an academically-oriented vocational school with a mission to educate students in grades 9-12, as well as adults, for construction and building trades. When its 15-year charter was set to expire, it submitted an application for renewal, but in February 2014 the DC Public Charter School Board voted 5-0-1 to deny the renewal. "PCSB reviewed the school’s application and found that the school failed to meet its charter goals and academic achievement expectations." The charter expired June 30, 2014.

== See also ==
- Education in the United States
- List of things named after Booker T. Washington
