= Washington (footballer, born 10 April 1975) =

Brazilian footballer

Personal information
- Full name: Washington Luiz Pereira dos Santos
- Date of birth: April 10, 1975 (age 51)
- Place of birth: São Paulo, Brazil
- Height: 1.83 m (6 ft 0 in)
- Position: Striker

Team information
- Current team: Nacional-AM

Senior career*
Years	Team	Apps	(Gls)
1994	Uberlândia		
1995	Nacional		
1996	União São João		
1997	Liège		
1998–2001	Louviéroise		
2001	Paraná		
2001	→ Cerezo Osaka (loan)	2	(1)
2002	Olaria		
2002	Atlético Mineiro		
2003	América-SP		
2004	Guaraní		
2005	América-MG		
2005	Sportivo Luqueño		
2005	Internacional		
2006	Remo		
2006	Marathon		
2006	São Gabriel		
2007–2008	Happy Valley	20	(0)
2009	Inter-SP		
2010	Taquaritinga		
2010–2011	São Raimundo-AM		
2011	Rio Branco		
2011–	Nacional-AM	5	(0)
- * Club domestic league appearances and goals

Washington Luiz Pereira dos Santos (born 10 April 1975) is a Brazilian football player who currently plays as a striker for Nacional Futebol Clube. He formerly played in Brazil, Belgium, Paraguay, Japan, Honduras and Hong Kong.

== Club statistics ==
Club performance			League		Cup		League Cup		Total	
Season	Club	League	Apps	Goals	Apps	Goals	Apps	Goals	Apps	Goals
Japan			League		Emperor's Cup		J.League Cup		Total	
2001	Cerezo Osaka	J1 League	2	1	0	0	0	0	2	1
Total			2	1	0	0	0	0	2	1
