= Washington, Wisconsin =

Washington, Wisconsin may refer to:

- Washington County, Wisconsin
- Washington Island, Door County, Wisconsin, a town
  - Washington (community), Wisconsin, an unincorporated community in Door County
- Washington, Eau Claire County, Wisconsin, a town
- Washington, Green County, Wisconsin, a town
- Washington, La Crosse County, Wisconsin, a town
- Washington, Rusk County, Wisconsin, a town
- Washington, Sauk County, Wisconsin, a town
- Washington, Shawano County, Wisconsin, a town
- Washington, Vilas County, Wisconsin, a town

== See also ==
- Port Washington, Wisconsin, a city
- Port Washington (town), Wisconsin, a town
- Washington Island (Wisconsin), an island in Lake Michigan
