= Wayne County School District =

Wayne County School District may refer to:

- Wayne County School District (Georgia)
- Wayne County School District (Kentucky)
- Wayne County School District (Mississippi)
- Wayne Community School District, Iowa
- Wayne County Public Schools, North Carolina
- Wayne County School District (Utah), a school district in Utah
- Wayne County Regional Educational Service Agency, Michigan
