= Washington Boulevard =

Washington Boulevard may refer to:

- Washington Boulevard (Arlington), Virginia, US
- Washington Boulevard (Baltimore), Maryland, US
- Washington Boulevard (Los Angeles), California, US
- Washington Boulevard (Tel Aviv), Israel
- Washington Boulevard Historic District, Detroit, Michigan, US

== See also ==
- Washington Avenue (disambiguation)
- Washington Street (disambiguation)
