= Booker T. Washington School (Terre Haute, Indiana) =

- Washington, Booker T., School
- U.S. National Register of Historic Places
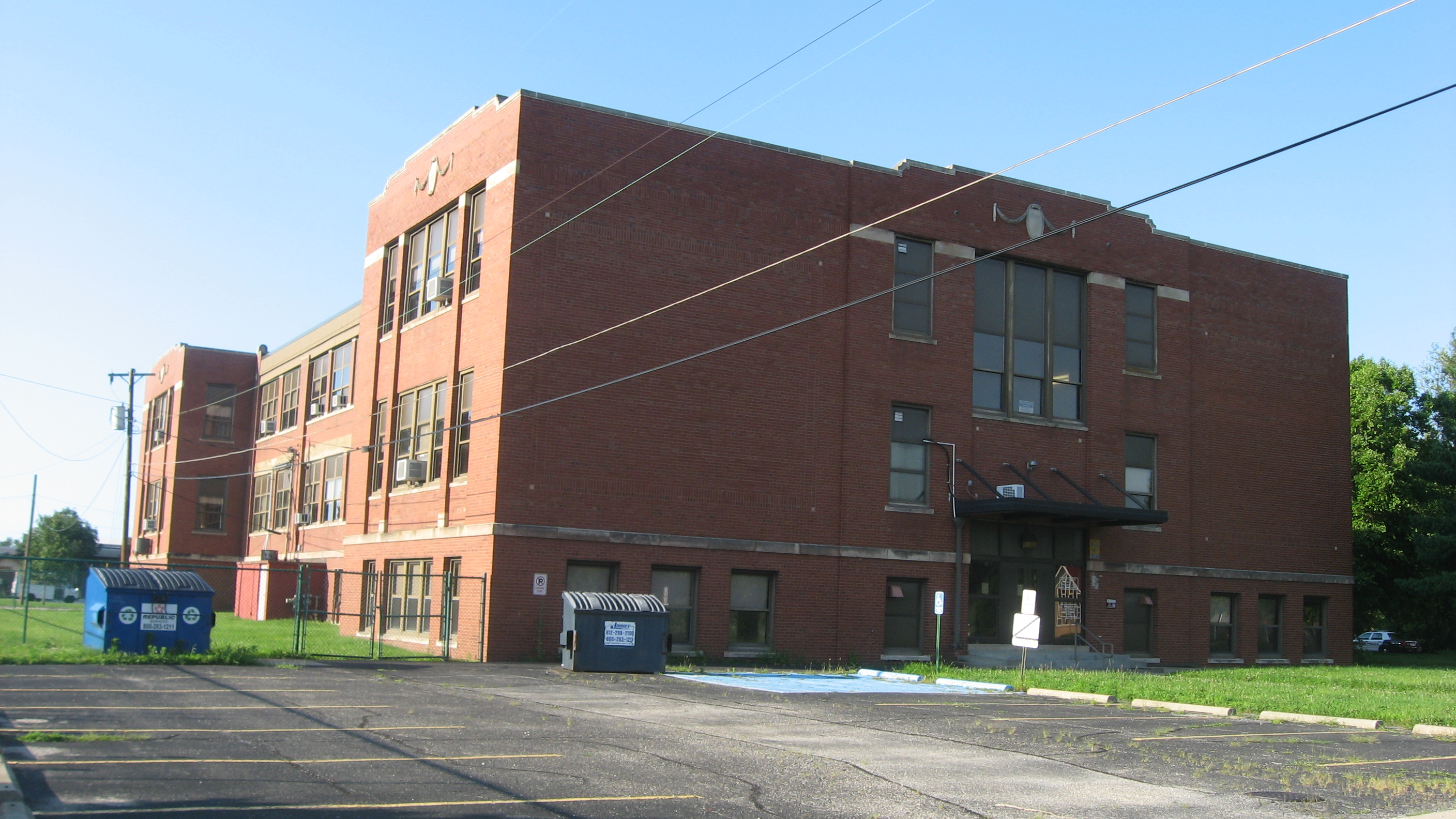
- Southern side of the school

- Location within Vigo County, Indiana Location within Indiana Location within the United States
- Location: 1201 S. 13th St., Terre Haute, Indiana; United States
- Coordinates: 39°27′15″N 87°23′53″W
- Built: 1914
- Architect: Johnson, Miller, Miller & Yeager (1926)
- Architectural style: Classical Revival
- NRHP reference No.: 02001170
- Added to NRHP: October 16, 2002

Booker T. Washington School, also known as District School #10 and Washington High School, is a historic school building located at Terre Haute, Indiana. It was built in 1914 and expanded in 1926 by the firm of Johnson, Miller, Miller & Yeager. It is a two-story, rectangular brick building with Classical Revival style design elements.

The structure was listed on the National Register of Historic Places in 2002 for its historical significance in African-American education in the area.

In recent years through the end of the 2001–2002 school year, the building has housed Booker T. Washington High School, a school for pregnant, parenting and alternative students. Because of safety issues and compliance with current state standards, Washington High School moved from its original location to a new structure near Terre Haute South Vigo High School. As of June 2008, the original building was undergoing appraisal in preparation for being listed for sale.

== See also ==
- List of things named after Booker T. Washington
