= Port Washington =

Port Washington is the name of some places in the United States of America:

- Port Washington, New York
- Port Washington, Ohio
- Port Washington, Wisconsin, a city
- Port Washington (town), Wisconsin, a town
- Dyes Inlet, Washington, an inlet, formerly named Port Washington
