= South Washington Street Historic District (North Attleborough, Massachusetts) =

Historic district in Massachusetts, United States

- U.S. National Register of Historic Places
- U.S. Historic district
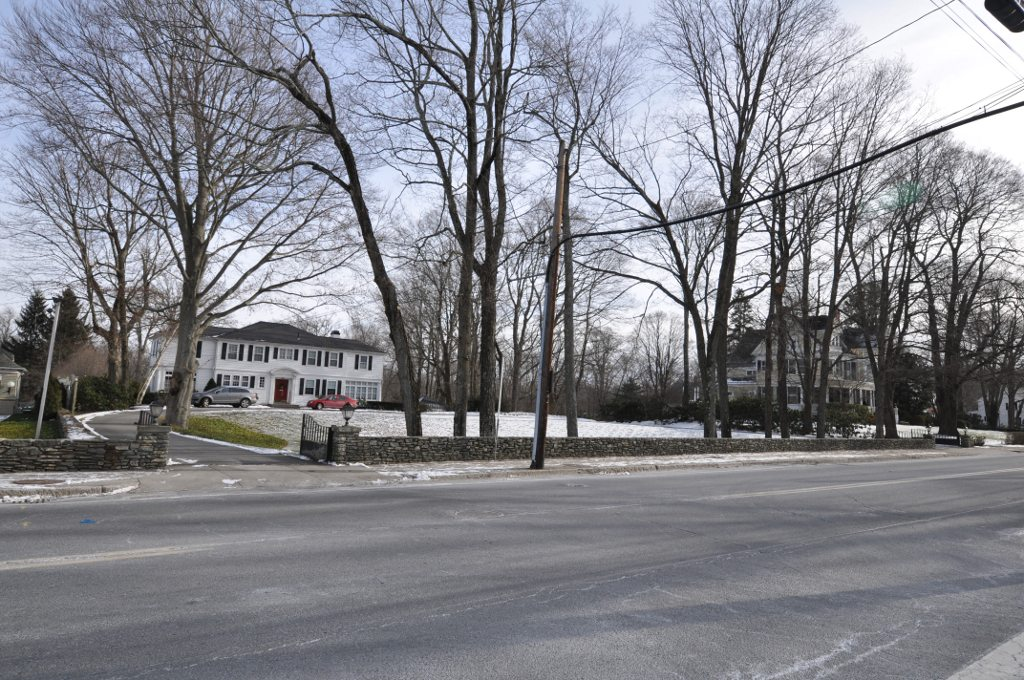

- Location within Massachusetts Location within the United States
- Location: North Attleborough, Massachusetts
- Coordinates: 41°58′29″N 71°20′7″W
- Area: 28.5 acres (11.5 ha)
- Architect: William Walker and Son; et al.
- Architectural style: Georgian, Greek Revival, Late Victorian
- NRHP reference No.: 95001173
- Added to NRHP: October 12, 1995

The South Washington Street Historic District is a historic district encompassing 200 years of residential architecture in North Attleborough, Massachusetts. It extends along South Washington Street in the central portion of the town, between Elm Street in the north, and Sutherland Street in the south and includes two properties on Hunking Street. The district was added to the National Register of Historic Places in 1995.

== Description and history ==
Washington Street in North Attleborough is a historic road which began as a Native American path and later was transformed into the major route between Boston, Massachusetts and Providence, Rhode Island. The district is located along this road, extending south from the village center of North Attleborough, while the principal transportation route (United States Route 1) has been relocated eastward. A variety of high quality residential houses, dating from the 18th to the mid-20th century, line this section of road. The colonial period is represented by several houses, the oldest of which is possibly the Edward Richards Homestead at 169 South Washington, which has at is core a c. 1762 structure. A second house, built by the locally prominent Draper family and now located at 327 South Washington, may date to 1750.

Most of the district's houses date to the late 19th and early 20th centuries, when North Attleborough was at its economic height as a jewelry manufacturing center. Houses from this period include the Stick style Hixon-Fisher House at 152 South Washington (c. 1881), the eclectic Louis Freeman House at 206 South Washington (c. 1891), and the high-style Queen Anne/Colonial Revival house of Walter Clark at 264 South Washington; it was designed by Providence architect William R. Walker.

== See also ==
- National Register of Historic Places listings in Bristol County, Massachusetts
