= Washington station =

Washington station may refer to:

== Main line stations ==
- Washington station (Missouri), an Amtrak station in Washington, Missouri
- Washington station (New Jersey), a disused station in Washington, New Jersey
- Washington railway station (England), in Washington, Tyne-and-Wear
- Washington Union Station, a major transit hub in Washington, D.C.
- Port Washington station, on Long Island, New York

== Transit stations ==
- Washington station, on Line 1 (Sistema de Tren Eléctrico Urbano) in Guadalajara, Mexico
- Washington station (Los Angeles Metro), a light rail station in California
- Washington Junction station (PAAC), a light rail station in Pittsburgh, Pennsylvania
- West Fourth Street–Washington Square station, a subway station in New York City

=== Chicago, Illinois (Chicago Transit Authority) ===
- Washington/Dearborn, a Blue Line subway station
- Washington/State, a closed Red Line subway station
- Washington/Wabash, an "L" station in the Loop
- Washington/Wells, an "L" station in the Loop

=== Boston, Massachusetts (Massachusetts Bay Transportation Authority) ===
- Washington Street station, a light rail station on the Green Line B branch Boston
- Washington Square station, a light rail station on the Green Line C branch in Brookline
- Downtown Crossing station, a downtown subway station, named Washington station from 1967 to 1987; the lower level was named Washington (or Washington Street) from its 1915 opening
- East Somerville station, a light rail station in Somerville, called Washington Street during much of its planning

==== Lines ====
- Washington Street Tunnel (Boston), a subway line directly under Washington Street
- Washington Street Elevated, a former elevated line above Washington Street
- SL4 (MBTA bus) & SL5 (MBTA bus), two Bus Rapid Transit routes on Washington Street

== See also ==
- Washington (disambiguation)
