= Chatom, Alabama =

Town in Washington County, Alabama, US

- Town
- Town of Chatom
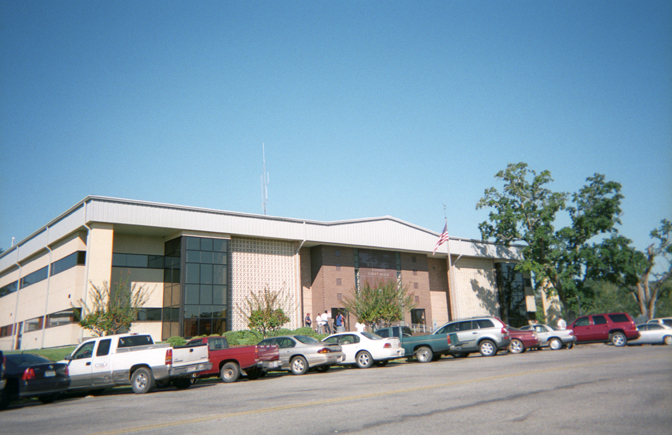
- The Washington County Courthouse

- Flag Seal

- Location of Chatom in Washington County, Alabama.
- Coordinates: 31°28′14″N 88°15′20″W
- Country: United States
- State: Alabama
- County: Washington

Area
  - Total: 10.72 sq mi (27.77 km^{2})
  - Land: 10.72 sq mi (27.77 km^{2})
  - Water: 0 sq mi (0.00 km^{2})
- Elevation: 164 ft (50 m)

Population (2020)
  - Total: 1,104
  - Density: 103.0/sq mi (39.75/km^{2})
- Time zone: UTC-6 (Central (CST))
  - Summer (DST): UTC-5 (CDT)
- ZIP code: 36518
- Area code: 251
- FIPS code: 01-14008
- GNIS feature ID: 2406259
- Website: https://www.chatom.org/

Chatom is a town in Washington County, Alabama, United States. It incorporated in 1949. Chatom is the county seat of Washington County, holding the distinction since 1907. As of the 2020 census, Chatom had a population of 1,104.

== Geography ==
According to the United States Census Bureau, the town has a total area of 10.9 square miles (28 km^{2}), all land.

=== Climate ===
The climate in this area is characterized by hot, humid summers and generally mild to cool winters. According to the Köppen Climate Classification system, Chatom has a humid subtropical climate, abbreviated "Cfa" on climate maps.

Climate data for Chatom, Alabama
Month	Jan	Feb	Mar	Apr	May	Jun	Jul	Aug	Sep	Oct	Nov	Dec	Year
Mean daily maximum °C (°F)	16 (60)	18 (65)	22 (72)	26 (79)	30 (86)	33 (91)	34 (93)	33 (92)	31 (88)	27 (80)	21 (70)	17 (62)	26 (78)
Mean daily minimum °C (°F)	2 (36)	3 (38)	7 (44)	11 (52)	16 (60)	19 (66)	21 (69)	20 (68)	18 (64)	11 (52)	6 (43)	3 (37)	11 (52)
Average precipitation mm (inches)	140 (5.5)	140 (5.5)	160 (6.2)	120 (4.9)	130 (5)	120 (4.9)	160 (6.3)	120 (4.8)	120 (4.6)	84 (3.3)	110 (4.3)	150 (5.8)	1,550 (61.1)
Source: Weatherbase

== Demographics ==
Historical population
Census	Pop.	Note	%±
1950	609		—
1960	993		63.1%
1970	1,059		6.6%
1980	1,122		5.9%
1990	1,094		−2.5%
2000	1,193		9.0%
2010	1,288		8.0%
2020	1,104		−14.3%
U.S. Decennial Census; 2013 Estimate

=== Racial and ethnic composition ===
Chatom town, Alabama – Racial and ethnic composition Note: the US Census treats Hispanic/Latino as an ethnic category. This table excludes Latinos from the racial categories and assigns them to a separate category. Hispanics/Latinos may be of any race. Race and ethnicity were not surveyed for populations under 2,500 in the 1980 census and under 1,000 in 1990 census.
Race / Ethnicity (NH = Non-Hispanic)	Pop 1990	Pop 2000	Pop 2010	Pop 2020	% 1990	% 2000	% 2010	% 2020
White alone (NH)	760	799	876	715	69.47%	66.97%	68.01%	64.76%
Black or African American alone (NH)	326	381	399	314	29.80%	31.94%	30.98%	28.44%
Native American or Alaska Native alone (NH)	5	5	0	8	0.46%	0.42%	0.00%	0.72%
Asian alone (NH)	3	0	0	1	0.27%	0.00%	0.00%	0.09%
Native Hawaiian or Pacific Islander alone (NH)	x	0	0	1	x	0.00%	0.00%	0.09%
Other race alone (NH)	0	0	0	6	0.00%	0.00%	0.00%	0.54%
Mixed race or Multiracial (NH)	x	2	5	40	x	0.17%	0.39%	3.62%
Hispanic or Latino (any race)	0	6	8	19	0.00%	0.50%	0.62%	1.72%
Total	1,094	1,193	1,288	1,104	100.00%	100.00%	100.00%	100.00%

=== 2020 census ===
As of the 2020 census, Chatom had a population of 1,104 and 406 households. A Census Bureau data table reports 249 families residing in the town.

The median age was 40.6 years. 23.0% of residents were under the age of 18 and 23.2% were 65 years of age or older. For every 100 females there were 89.0 males, and for every 100 females age 18 and over there were 82.8 males.

0.0% of residents lived in urban areas, while 100.0% lived in rural areas.

Of the 406 households, 35.7% had children under the age of 18 living in them. Of all households, 42.4% were married-couple households, 15.5% had a male householder with no spouse or partner present, and 37.9% had a female householder with no spouse or partner present. About 31.3% of all households were made up of individuals, and 11.6% had someone living alone who was 65 years of age or older.

There were 463 housing units, of which 12.3% were vacant. The homeowner vacancy rate was 3.3% and the rental vacancy rate was 5.8%.

=== 2010 census ===
At the 2010 census there were 1,288 people, 458 households, and 326 families living in the town. The population density was 118.2 inhabitants per square mile (45.6/km^{2}). There were 521 housing units at an average density of 47.8 per square mile (18.5/km^{2}). The ethnic makeup of the town was 68.2% White, 31.1% Black or African American, 0% Native American, 0.3% from other races, and 0.4% from two or more races. 0.6% of the population were Hispanic or Latino of any race. Of the 458 households 33.8% had children under the age of 18 living with them, 46.9% were married couples living together, 20.7% had a female householder with no husband present, and 28.8% were non-families. 26.2% of households were one person and 11.8% were one person aged 65 or older. The average household size was 2.49 and the average family size was 3.02.

The age distribution was 26.3% under the age of 18, 7.6% from 18 to 24, 23.9% from 25 to 44, 24.4% from 45 to 64, and 17.8% 65 or older. The median age was 38.8 years. For every 100 females, there were 90.3 males. For every 100 females age 18 and over, there were 95.7 males.

The median household income was $23,250 and the median family income was $27,375. Males had a median income of $47,500 versus $28,235 for females. The per capita income for the town was $13,431. About 28.3% of families and 35.3% of the population were below the poverty line, including 56.3% of those under age 18 and 6.1% of those age 65 or over.

=== 2000 census ===
At the 2000 census there were 1,193 people, 449 households, and 308 families living in the town. The population density was 109.7 inhabitants per square mile (42.4/km^{2}). There were 523 housing units at an average density of 48.1 per square mile (18.6/km^{2}). The ethnic makeup of the town was 67.23% White, 32.10% Black or African American, 0.42% Native American, 0.08% from other races, and 0.17% from two or more races. 0.50% of the population were Hispanic or Latino of any race. Of the 449 households 38.1% had children under the age of 18 living with them, 48.6% were married couples living together, 18.0% had a female householder with no husband present, and 31.4% were non-families. 28.7% of households were one person and 15.4% were one person aged 65 or older. The average household size was 2.48 and the average family size was 3.10.

The age distribution was 27.9% under the age of 18, 9.1% from 18 to 24, 23.9% from 25 to 44, 19.3% from 45 to 64, and 19.9% 65 or older. The median age was 35 years. For every 100 females, there were 83.8 males. For every 100 females age 18 and over, there were 73.4 males.

The median household income was $31,319 and the median family income was $41,563. Males had a median income of $36,518 versus $19,750 for females. The per capita income for the town was $16,650. About 17.3% of families and 23.5% of the population were below the poverty line, including 34.4% of those under age 18 and 20.9% of those age 65 or over.

== Notable natives ==
- Rusty Jackson, former NFL punter for the Los Angeles Rams and Buffalo Bills
- Shawna Thompson, member of country music duo Thompson Square
