= Washington County =

Washington County may refer to:

Washington counties in the United States.

== Extant counties in the United States ==
- Washington County, Alabama
- Washington County, Arkansas
- Washington County, Colorado
- Washington County, Florida
- Washington County, Georgia
- Washington County, Idaho
- Washington County, Illinois
- Washington County, Indiana
- Washington County, Iowa
- Washington County, Kansas
- Washington County, Kentucky
- Washington Parish, Louisiana
- Washington County, Maine
- Washington County, Maryland
- Washington County, Minnesota
- Washington County, Mississippi
- Washington County, Missouri
- Washington County, Nebraska
- Washington County, New York
- Washington County, North Carolina
- Washington County, Ohio
- Washington County, Oklahoma
- Washington County, Oregon
- Washington County, Pennsylvania
- Washington County, Rhode Island
- Washington County, Tennessee
- Washington County, Texas
- Washington County, Utah
- Washington County, Vermont
- Washington County, Virginia
- Washington County, Wisconsin

== Former counties in the United States ==
- Washington County, D.C., abolished in 1871
- Washington County, Massachusetts, became Washington County, Maine in 1820
- Washington District, North Carolina, became part of Tennessee in 1796
- Washington County, South Dakota, 1883–1943

== Other uses ==
- Washington County (album), by Arlo Guthrie, 1970

== See also ==
- George Washington, revolutionary war general and first President of the United States
- Washington County School District (disambiguation)
- List of memorials to George Washington
- List of counties in Washington
