= Washington School (Taunton, Massachusetts) =

- U.S. National Register of Historic Places
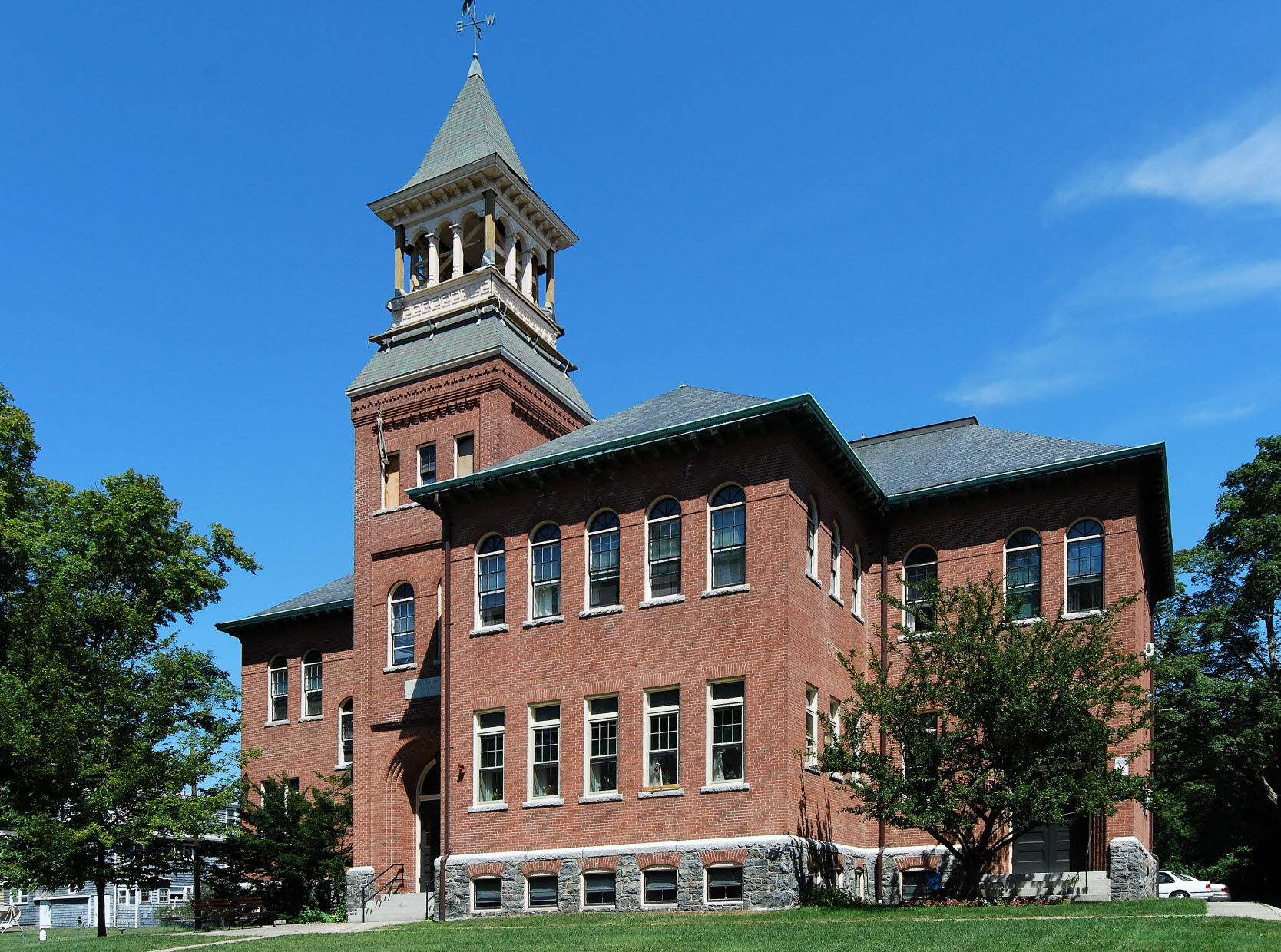
- former Washington School

- Location within Massachusetts Location within the United States
- Location: Taunton, Massachusetts
- Coordinates: 41°53′45″N 71°6′22″W
- Built: 1897
- Architect: Smith, Gustavus L.
- Architectural style: Colonial Revival
- MPS: Taunton MRA
- NRHP reference No.: 84002261
- Added to NRHP: July 5, 1984

The Washington School is a historic school building at 40 Vernon Street in Taunton, Massachusetts. The two story brick building was designed Gustavus L. Smith, and built in 1897 during a period of burgeoning growth in the city. The building was listed on the National Register of Historic Places in 1984. It has been converted to residential use.

== Description and history ==
The Washington School building is located at the eastern corner of Vernon and East Vernon Streets, west of the city's downtown area. It is a two-story brick building, roughly T-shaped, with a hip roof and a square tower at one of its inner corners. It is architecturally eclectic, having a somewhat typical Colonial Revival massing, with Italianate rounded windows on the upper level. The tower has Renaissance Revival details at its belfry level, with round-arch colonnades supported by round columns, and a modillioned cornice below a bellcast pyramidal roof. The main entrance, set in the base of the tower, is recessed within a round-arch opening, with a half-round fanlight above.

The school was built in 1897 to relieve overcrowding at a number of other schools in central Taunton, and was named for George Washington. It is one of three schools designed for the city by local architect Gustavus L. Smith, and is the fifth oldest surviving school building in the city. It has been converted to residential use, and is now known as "Washington House".

== See also ==
- National Register of Historic Places listings in Taunton, Massachusetts
