= George Washington High School =

George Washington High School may refer to a number of high schools including:

- George Washington Preparatory High School, Los Angeles, California
- Washington High School (Cedar Rapids, Iowa) in Cedar Rapids, Iowa
- George Washington High School (San Francisco) in San Francisco, California
- George Washington High School (Colorado) in Denver, Colorado
- George Washington High School (Delray Beach) in Delray Beach, Florida
- George Washington High School (Guam) in Mangilao, Guam
- George Washington High School (Chicago) in Chicago, Illinois
- George Washington Community High School in Indianapolis, Indiana
- George Washington High School (New York City) in New York City, New York
- George Washington High School (Philadelphia) in Philadelphia, Pennsylvania
- George Washington High School (Danville, Virginia) in Danville, Virginia
- George Washington High School (Charleston, West Virginia) in Charleston, West Virginia

== Past schools ==
- George Washington High School in Alexandria, Virginia, one of the predecessors to today's Alexandria City High School

== See also ==
- Washington High School (disambiguation)
- Washington County High School (disambiguation)
