= Booker T. Washington School (Ashland, Kentucky) =

Coordinates: 38°28′53.3″N 82°39′02.6″W

Booker T. Washington School was a school for African Americans in Ashland, Kentucky. It was named after Booker T. Washington (1856–1915), the American civil rights leader, educator and author. The school taught black children grades 1 through 12.

The brick schoolhouse stood at the corner Seventh Street and Central Avenue. The school closed in 1962. The building has since been razed. A state historical plaque marks the location.
