= South Washington Street Historic District (Watertown, Wisconsin) =

Historic district in Wisconsin, United States

- U.S. National Register of Historic Places
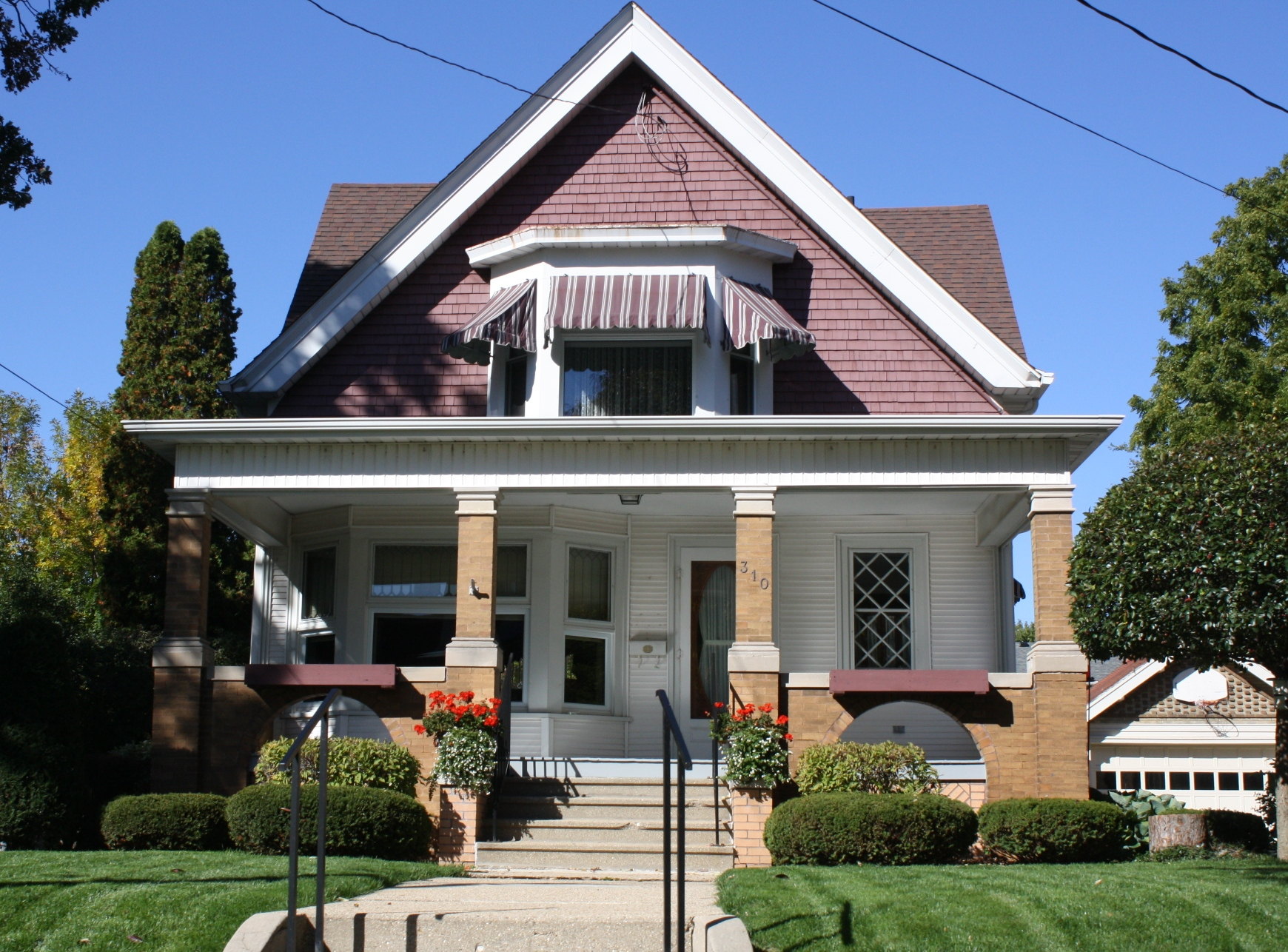
- A house located in the district.
- Location: Odd numbered 201-309 S. Church St. and S. Washington St. from Emmet St. to West St., Watertown, Wisconsin
- Area: 11.7 acres (4.7 ha)
- NRHP reference No.: 03001220
- Added to NRHP: November 26, 2003

The South Washington Street Historic District is a residential historic district located in Watertown, Wisconsin. The district includes 39 buildings, 32 of which are considered contributing buildings to its historic character.

== History ==
The area which is now the district was platted in the 1860s, and development began in the 1870s. New construction in the district continued through the 1930s. The district is largely made up of large, upscale houses, many of which were owned by politicians or local businessmen. Jesse Stone, a Lieutenant Governor of Wisconsin, resided at 300 South Washington Street in what is now the district. The district includes examples of most popular architectural styles of the late nineteenth and early twentieth centuries, including Federal, Italianate, Second Empire, Queen Anne, Craftsman, Colonial Revival, and Georgian Revival.

The district was added to the State and the National Register of Historic Places in 2003.
