= Washington Township, Pennsylvania =

Washington Township may be any of these 22 places in the U.S. state of Pennsylvania:

- Washington Township, Armstrong County, Pennsylvania
- Washington Township, Berks County, Pennsylvania
- Washington Township, Butler County, Pennsylvania
- Washington Township, Cambria County, Pennsylvania
- Washington Township, Clarion County, Pennsylvania
- Washington Township, Dauphin County, Pennsylvania
- Washington Township, Erie County, Pennsylvania
- Washington Township, Fayette County, Pennsylvania
- Washington Township, Franklin County, Pennsylvania
- Washington Township, Greene County, Pennsylvania
- Washington Township, Indiana County, Pennsylvania
- Washington Township, Jefferson County, Pennsylvania
- Washington Township, Lawrence County, Pennsylvania
- Washington Township, Lehigh County, Pennsylvania
- Washington Township, Lycoming County, Pennsylvania
- Washington Township, Northampton County, Pennsylvania
- Washington Township, Northumberland County, Pennsylvania
- Washington Township, Schuylkill County, Pennsylvania
- Washington Township, Snyder County, Pennsylvania
- Washington Township, Westmoreland County, Pennsylvania
- Washington Township, Wyoming County, Pennsylvania
- Washington Township, York County, Pennsylvania

== See also ==
- Warrington Township, Bucks County, Pennsylvania
- Warrington Township, York County, Pennsylvania
- Washington, Pennsylvania (disambiguation)
