= List of things named after Booker T. Washington =

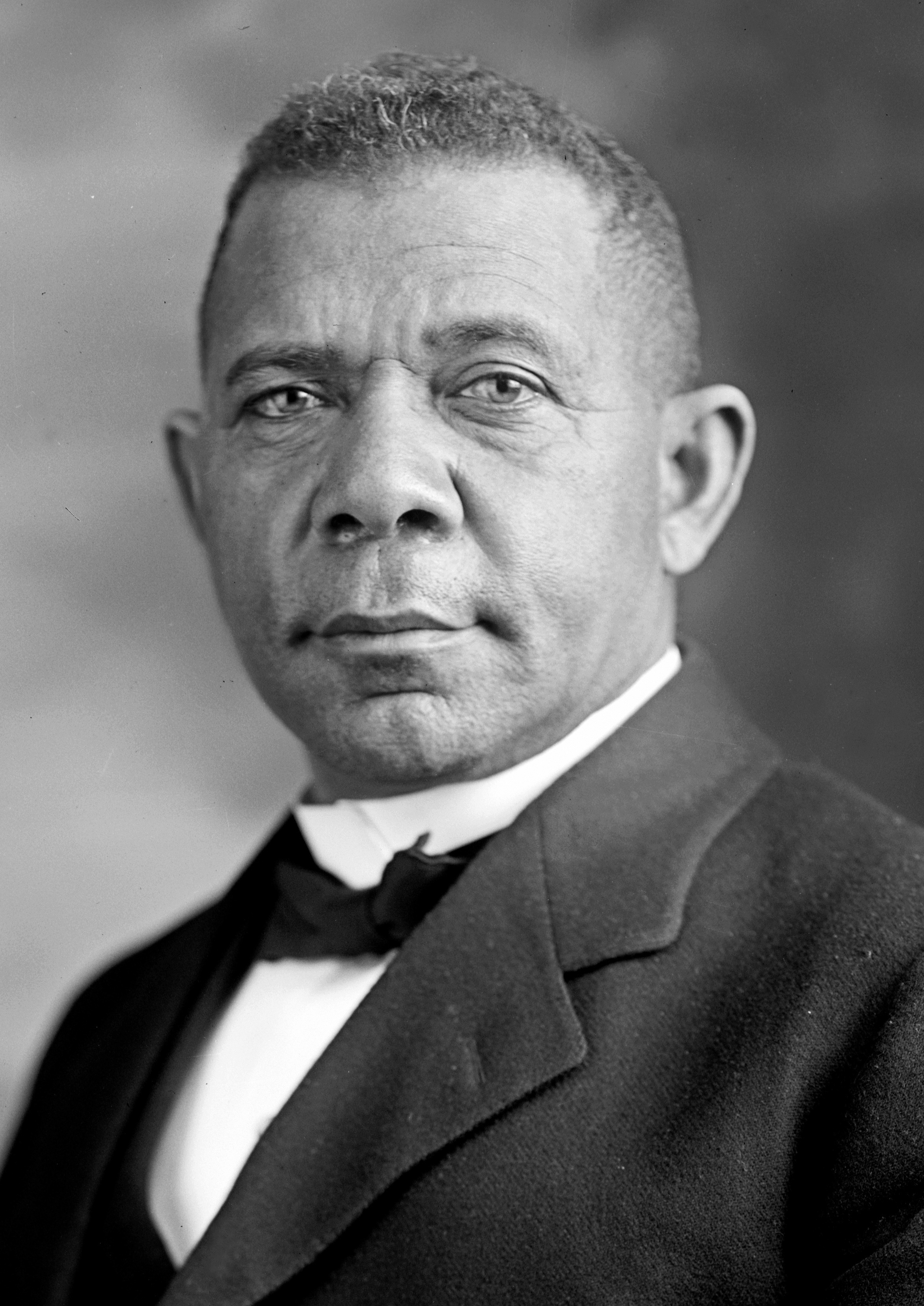
Booker T. Washington (1856–1915)

The following is a list of things and places named after American educator Booker T. Washington.

== Places ==
=== Parks ===
- Booker T. Washington State Park – situated on the shores of Chickamauga Lake in Tennessee
- Booker T. Washington State Park – former state park in West Virginia
- Booker T. Washington Park – Midland, Texas
- Booker T. Washington Park – Charlottesville, Virginia
- Booker T. Washington Park - Altoona, Pennsylvania
- Booker T. Washington Center - Altoona, Pennsylvania
- Booker T. Washington Park – on the campus of West Virginia State University

== Schools ==
=== Colleges ===
- Booker T. Washington Junior College in Pensacola, Florida

=== High schools ===
- Booker T. Washington Magnet High School in Montgomery, Alabama
- Booker T. Washington High School in Tuskegee, Alabama
- KIPP * Booker T. Washington High School (New Orleans)
- Booker T. Washington Public Charter School in Washington, District of Columbia
- Booker T. Washington High School (Miami, Florida)
- Booker T. Washington High School (Pensacola, Florida)
- Booker T. Washington High School (Atlanta, Georgia), listed on the National Register of Historic Places (NRHP) in Fulton County
- Booker T. Washington High School (Shreveport, Louisiana)
- Booker T. Washington High School (Tulsa, Oklahoma)
- Booker T. Washington High School in Columbia, South Carolina
- Booker T. Washington High School (Memphis, Tennessee)
- Booker T. Washington High School for the Performing and Visual Arts in Dallas, Texas
- Booker T. Washington High School (Houston, Texas)
- Booker T. Washington High School (Norfolk, Virginia)
- Booker T. Washington High School (London, West Virginia), listed on the NRHP in Kanawha County
- Booker T. Washington High School (Rocky Mount, NC)

=== Middle schools ===
- Booker T. Washington Middle School (Baltimore) — Baltimore, Maryland
- Booker T. Washington Middle School (Newport News) — Newport News, Virginia
- Booker T. Washington Middle School (New York) — New York City, New York

=== Elementary schools ===
- Booker T. Washington Elementary School (Hobbs) — Hobbs, New Mexico
- Booker T. Washington Elementary School (Mesa, Arizona) — Even though this school now goes simply by "Washington," in Google Maps street view you can still see the original sign that says "BOOKER T. WASHINGTON ELEMENTARY SCHOOL," directly behind the flag pole.

=== Past schools ===
- Booker T. Washington High School in Wichita Falls, Texas – closed in 1969, later serving as Washington-Jackson Math & Science Center.
- Booker T. Washington High School for Coloreds in Staunton, Virginia – from 1936 to 1966, now serving as the Booker T. Washington Community Center.
- Booker T. Washington Middle School in Wichita Falls, Texas – closed in 1970.
- Booker T. Washington Middle School in Tampa, Florida – closed in 2004. (Note: Tampa has a B.T. Washington Elementary School.)

== Other things ==
=== Facilities, other than public schools ===
- Booker T. Washington Institute at West Virginia State University
- Booker T. Washington Bridge, over the Hampton River near Washington's alma mater, Hampton University of Virginia
- Booker T. Washington Community Center , Hamilton, Ohio

=== Vehicles ===
- SS Booker T. Washington, World War II Liberty ship
- Booker T. Washington, 1930s airplane named at the request of Robert Russa Moton, Washington's successor

=== Geographical features ===
- Mount Booker, in Washington (state)
